= Pontiac Bonneville =

Pontiac model line of mid and full-sized cars (1958-2005)

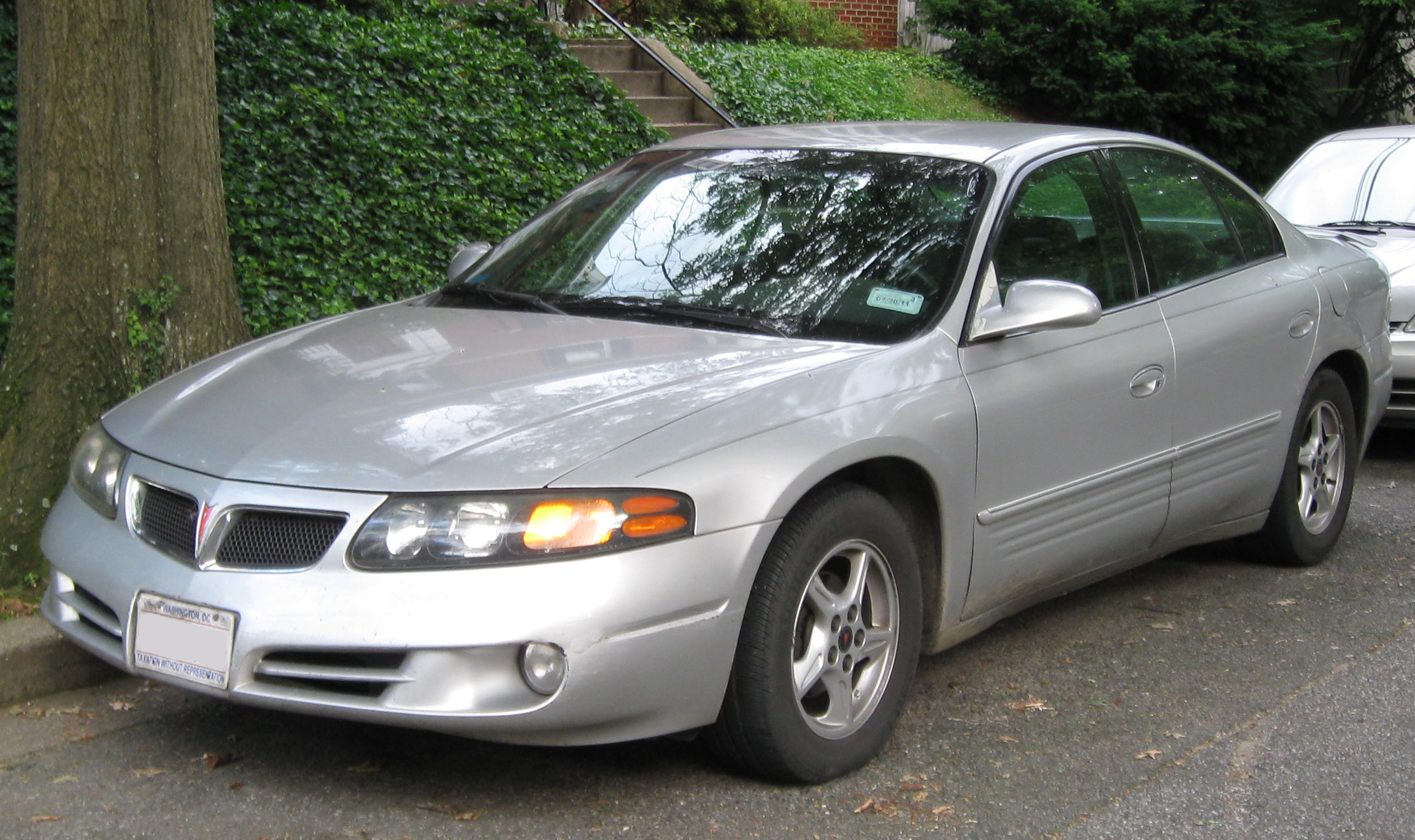
- 2000–2005 Pontiac Bonneville

Overview
- Manufacturer: Pontiac (General Motors)
- Production: 1958–2005; 1983–2005 (Canada)
- Assembly: Pontiac Assembly, Pontiac, Michigan

Body and chassis
- Class: Full-size car (1957–1981 and 1987–2005); Mid-size car (1982–1986)
- Layout: FR layout (1958–1986); Transverse front-engine, front-wheel drive (1987–2005)

Chronology
- Predecessor: Pontiac Star Chief; Pontiac Executive (1971)
- Successor: Pontiac G8

The Pontiac Bonneville is a model line of full-size or mid-size rear-wheel drive (until 1987) or front-wheel drive cars manufactured and marketed by Pontiac from 1957 until 2005.

The Bonneville (marketed as the Parisienne in Canada until 1981), and its platform partner, the Grand Ville, are some of the largest Pontiacs ever built; in station wagon body styles they reached just over 230 inches (5.8 m) long. They were also some of the heaviest cars produced at the time at 5,000 pounds (2,300 kg) or more.

The Bonneville nameplate was introduced as a limited production performance convertible during the 1957 model year, its name taken from the Bonneville Salt Flats in Utah, an early site of U.S. automobile racing and numerous world land speed records.

== Origin ==
Star Chief Bonneville
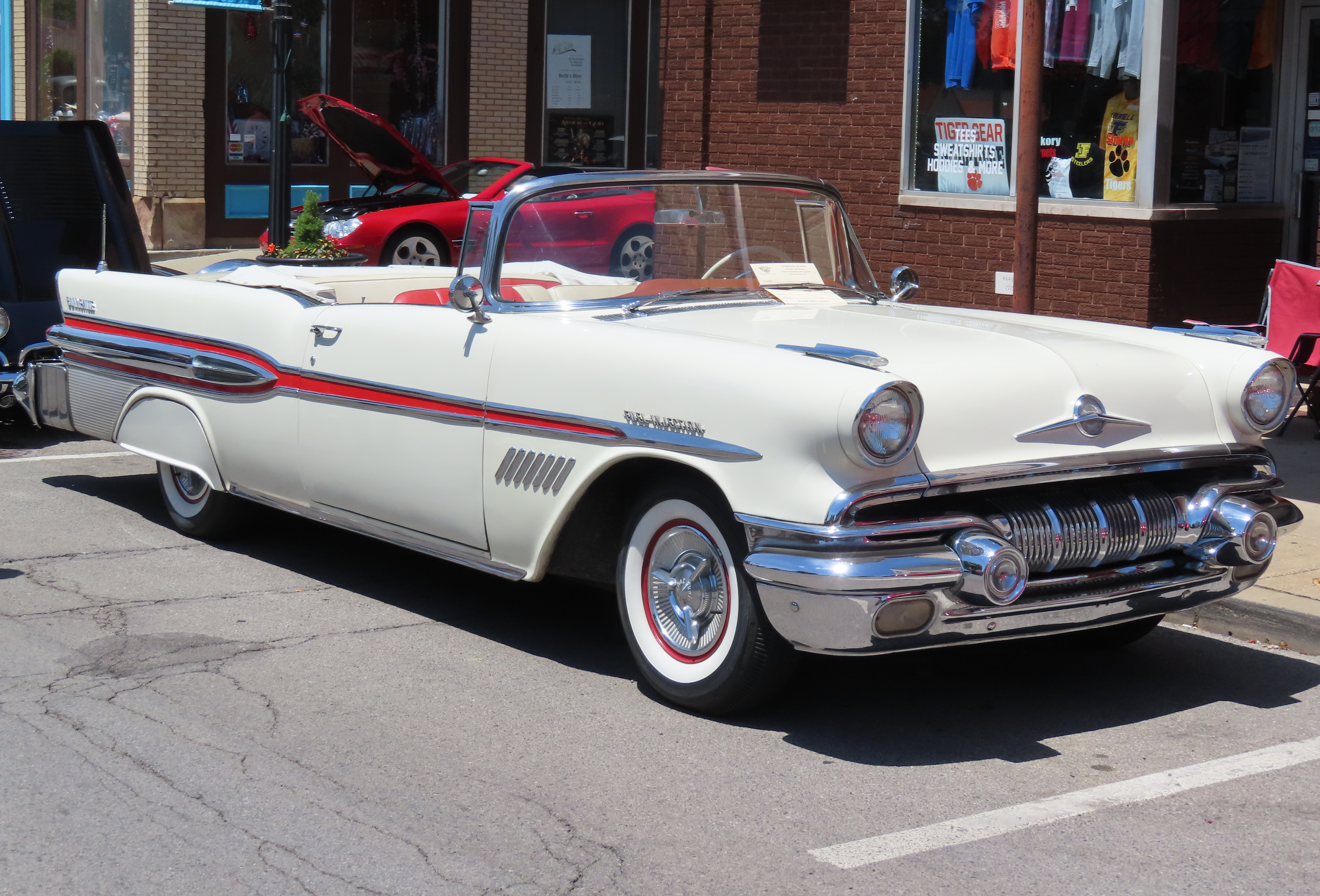
- 1957 Pontiac Star Chief Bonneville convertible

Overview
- Model years: 1957
- Designer: Harley Earl

Body and chassis
- Body style: 2-door convertible
- Platform: A-body
- Related: Pontiac Star Chief

Powertrain
- Engine: 347 cu in (5.7 L) Strato Streak V8 (fuel injected)
- Transmission: 3-speed Strato-Flight Hydra-Matic

Dimensions
- Wheelbase: 124 in (3,100 mm)
- Length: 213.7 in (5,430 mm)
- Width: 75.2 in (1,910 mm)
- Curb weight: 3,860 lb (1,750 kg)

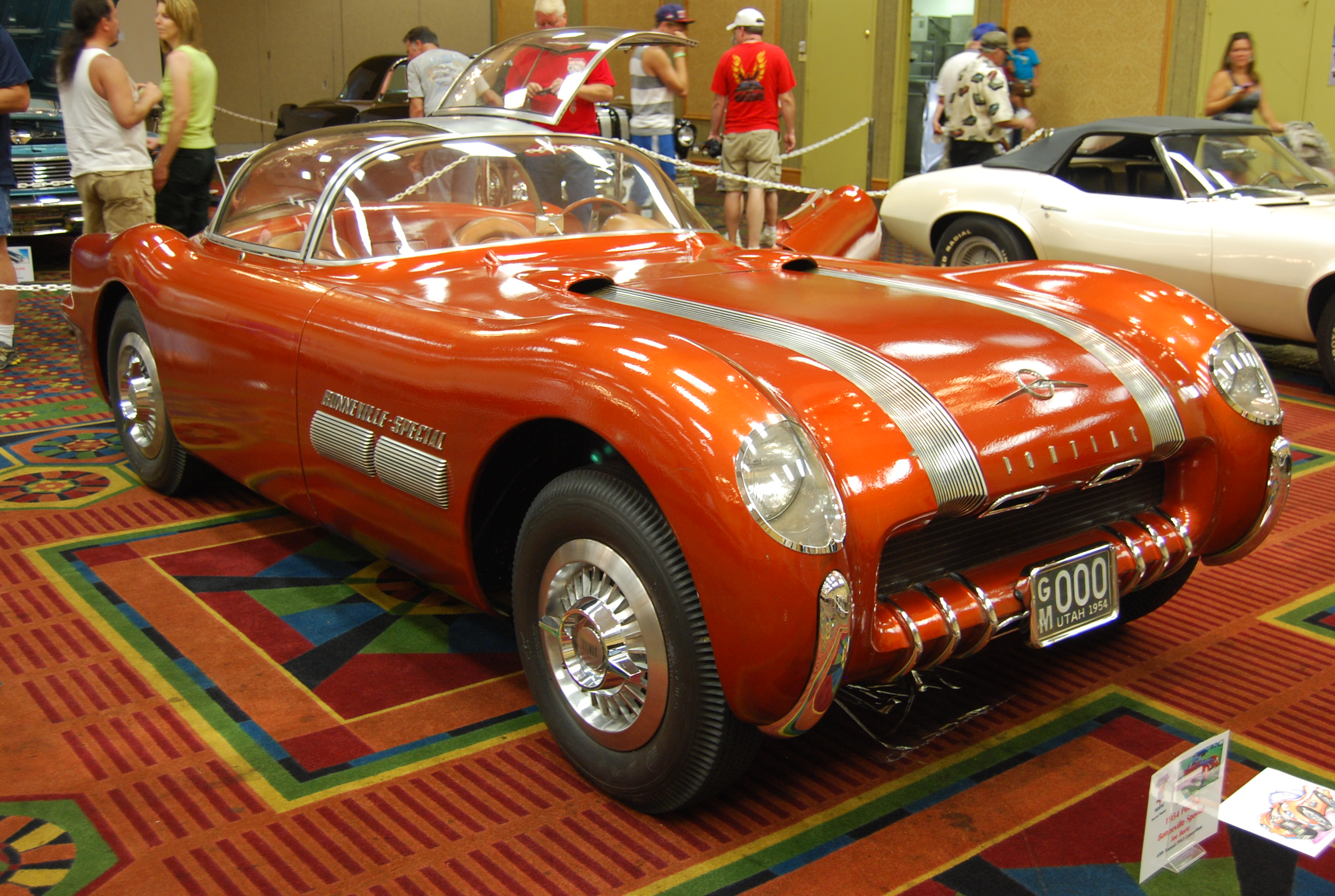
1954 Pontiac Bonneville Special

The Bonneville name first appeared in 1954 on a pair of bubble-topped GM Motorama concept cars called the Bonneville Special, sharing an appearance with the Chevrolet Corvette. It was also the beginning of a new tradition of Pontiac vehicles using French words for model names.

It entered the production lineup as a high-performance, fuel-injected luxury convertible version of the Star Chief in 1957, and was loaded with every available option as standard equipment to include leather upholstery, power adjustable front seat, power windows, power steering, power brakes and power convertible top with the exception of air conditioning and a fashionable for the time continental kit.

Standard only for the Bonneville was Pontiac's first-ever fuel injection system. A mechanical system built by Rochester, it was similar in principle, but not identical, to the contemporary Chevrolet Bel Air installed with the Rochester Ramjet continuous mechanical fuel injection (closed-loop). Pontiac did not release official power ratings for this engine, which had only been introduced earlier in 1955 replacing the flathead straight eight, saying only that it had more than 300 hp (224 kW). Contemporary road tests suggest that it was somewhat inferior to the Tri-Power engines, though it did offer better fuel economy.

This put the Bonneville in a Cadillac-like price range of US$5,782 ($66,281 in 2025 dollars) - more than double the base price of the Chieftain on which it was built, with the result being a fully equipped Bonneville could cost more than the longer, entry-level Cadillac Series 62. Only 630 units were produced that first year, all of them fuel-injected, making it one of the most collectible Pontiacs of all time and was introduced to compete with the Chrysler 300C. The following year it became a separate model, and it would endure until 2005 as the division's top-of-the-line model.

== First generation (1958) ==
First generation
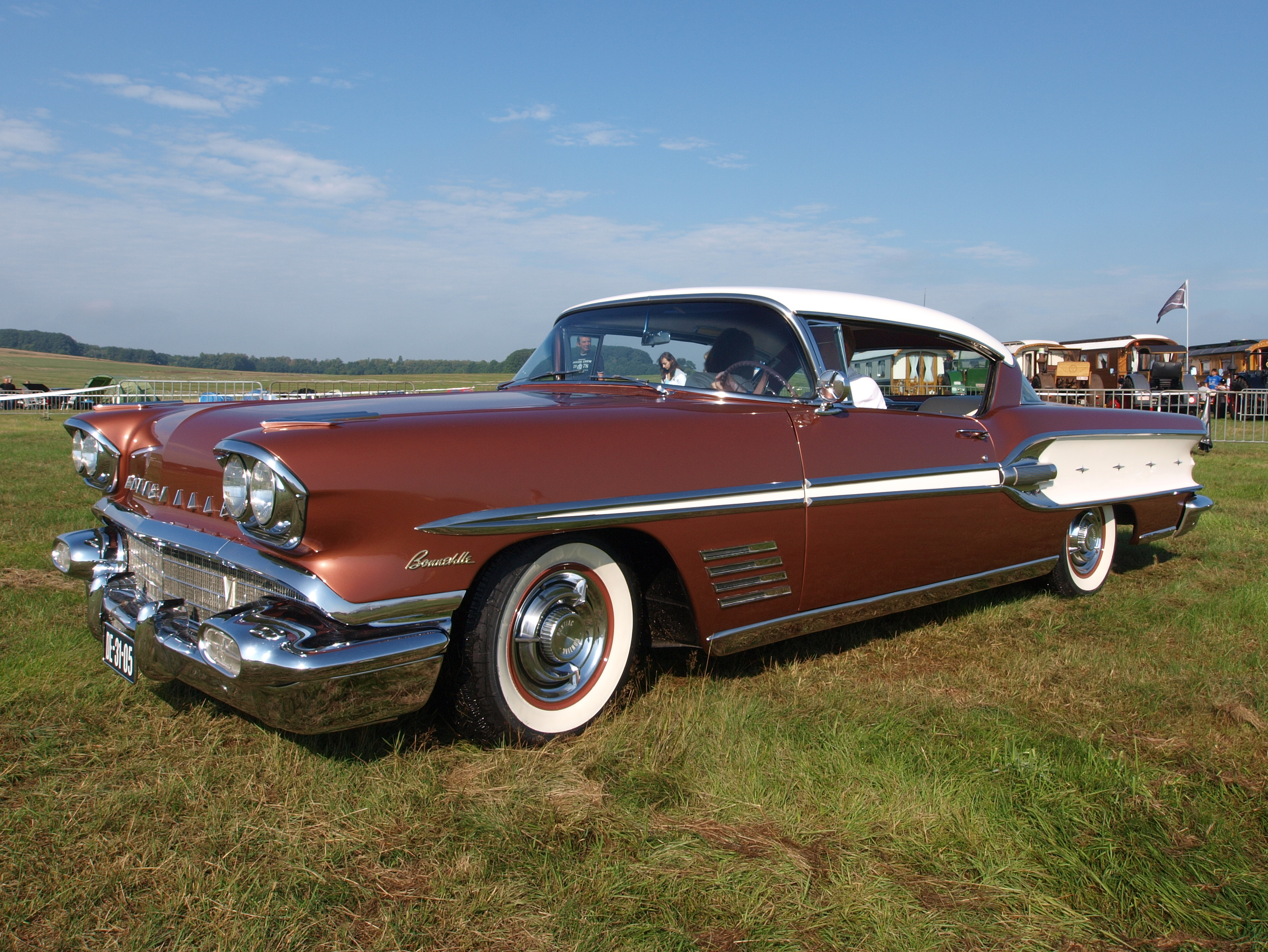
- 1958 Pontiac Bonneville Catalina Sport Coupe

Overview
- Model years: 1958
- Assembly: (main plant); Pontiac, Michigan, United States (Pontiac Assembly) (branch assembly); Doraville, Georgia, United States (Doraville Assembly) "Atlanta"; Framingham, Massachusetts, United States (Framingham Assembly); Kansas City, Kansas, United States (Fairfax Assembly); Linden, New Jersey, United States (Linden Assembly); South Gate, California, United States (South Gate Assembly); Wilmington, Delaware, United States (Wilmington Assembly)
- Designer: Harley Earl

Body and chassis
- Body style: 2-door convertible 2-door hardtop
- Layout: FR layout
- Platform: B-body
- Related: Chevrolet Bel Air Impala

Powertrain
- Engine: 370 cu in (6.1 L) Tempest 370 V8
- Transmission: 3-speed manual 3-speed Super Hydra-Matic automatic

Dimensions
- Wheelbase: 122 in (3,099 mm)
- Length: 211.7 in (5,377 mm)
- Width: 77.4 in (1,966 mm)
- Curb weight: 3,925 lb (1,780 kg)

The Bonneville became a separate model in 1958, available as a two-door hardtop or a convertible. It paced the Indianapolis 500 in its first year. As a separate model, Bonneville had a significantly lower price tag of $3,586 ($40,017 in 2025 dollars) for the convertible, thanks to the removal of most of the luxury items found on the 1957 Star Chief bodystyle from standard equipment to the option list. Also a 255 hp (190 kW) 369.4 cu in (6,053 cc) V8, marketed as a "370", with four-barrel carburetor and dual exhausts was now standard equipment.

The fuel-injection system continued to be offered with the standard engine on the 1957 Star Chief bodystyle was now listed as an extra cost option but very few 1958 Bonnevilles were so equipped due to a towering option price tag of US$500 ($5,580 in 2025 dollars), which was not considered a very good value considering that for US$93.50, a more reliable Tri-Power option was available with three Rochester two-barrel carburetors and similar power. The Tri-Power produces a claimed 300 hp (224 kW), while the fuel injected version was rated at 310 hp (231 kW) at 4800 rpm and 400 lb⋅ft (542 N⋅m) at 3,000 rpm on 10.5:1 compression.

The retail price dropped from the previous year to US$3,481 ($38,845 in 2025 dollars) for the coupe, adding leather interior and a power-operated convertible top. The fuel-injected engine became an option on any Pontiac model. Only about 400 were produced before the fuel injection system was quietly dropped, and fuel injection would not be offered on the Bonneville until 1987 with the Eighth Generation.

For 1958, GM was promoting their fiftieth year of production, and introduced Anniversary models for each brand; Cadillac, Buick, Oldsmobile, Pontiac, and Chevrolet. The 1958 models shared a common appearance on the top models for each brand; Cadillac Eldorado Seville, Buick Limited Riviera, Oldsmobile Starfire 98, Pontiac Bonneville Catalina, and the all-new Chevrolet Bel-Air Impala. 1958 was also the year the "Silver Streak" styling feature was no longer offered, which was first used in 1933. It was also the last year of Harley Earls tenure as department head of GM's "Art and Colour Section".

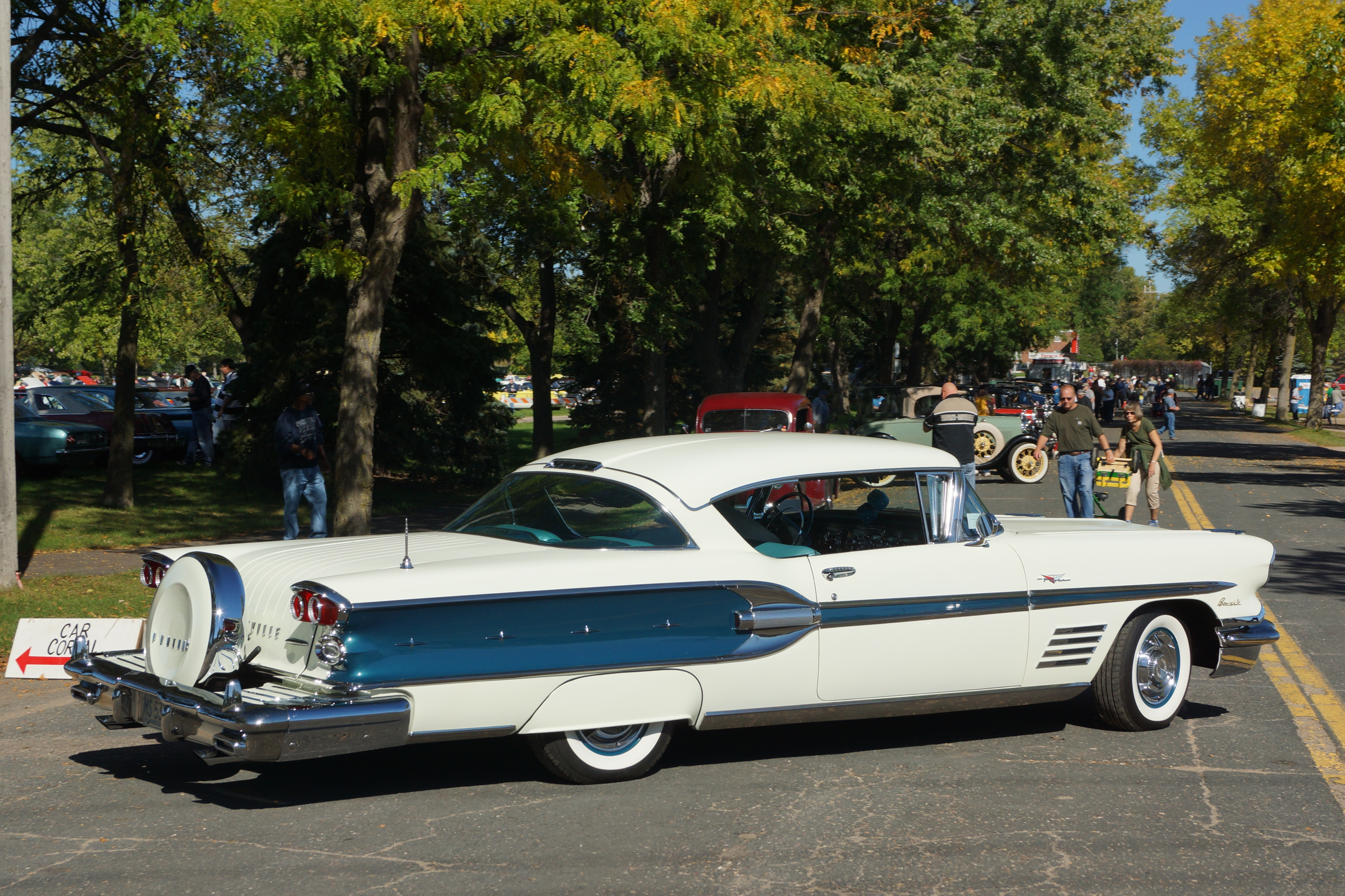
Rear view of 1958 Bonneville fitted with a continental kit.

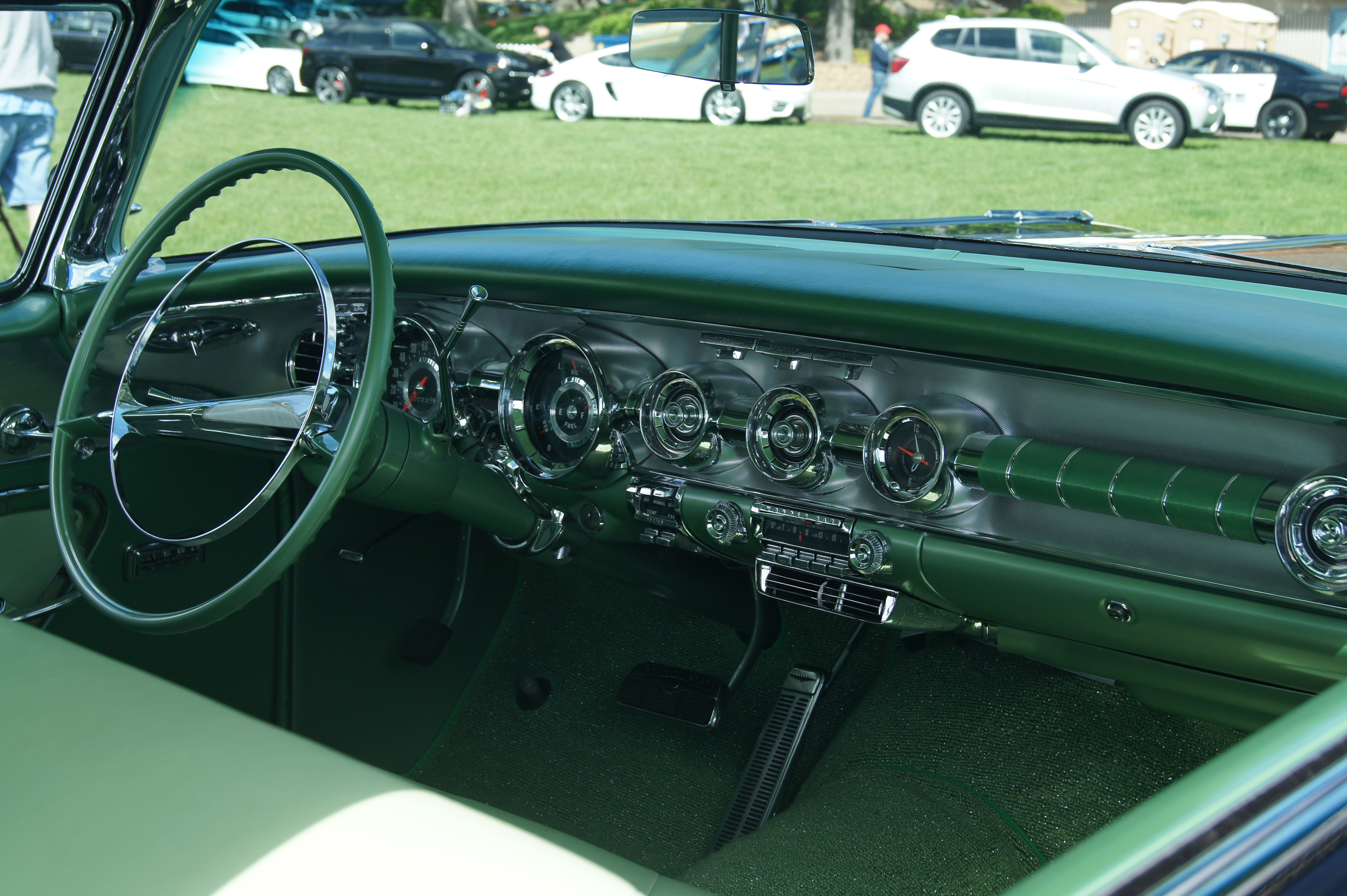
1958 Pontiac Bonneville interior

== Second generation (1959–1960) ==
Second generation
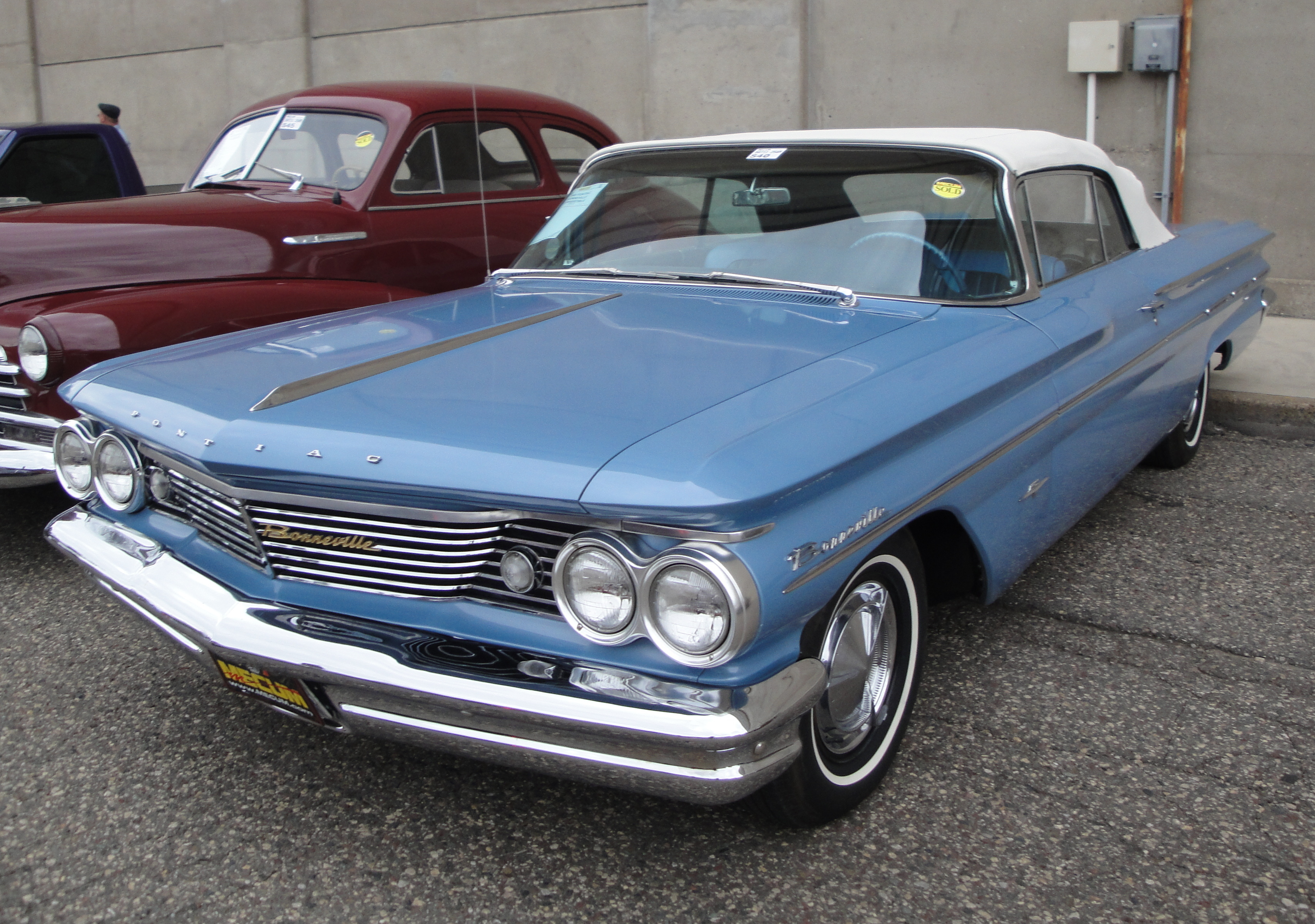
- 1960 Pontiac Bonneville Convertible Coupe

Overview
- Model years: 1959–1960
- Assembly: (main plant); Pontiac, Michigan, United States (Pontiac Assembly) (branch assembly); Arlington, Texas, United States (Arlington Assembly); Doraville, Georgia, United States (Doraville Assembly) "Atlanta"; Kansas City, Kansas, United States (Fairfax Assembly); Linden, New Jersey, United States (Linden Assembly); South Gate, California, United States (South Gate Assembly); Wilmington, Delaware, United States (Wilmington Assembly)
- Designer: Harley Earl

Body and chassis
- Body style: 2-door convertible 2-door coupe 4-door sedan 4-door station wagon 4-door hardtop
- Layout: FR layout
- Platform: B-body
- Related: Buick LeSabre; Chevrolet Impala; Oldsmobile 88

Powertrain
- Engine: 389 cu in (6.4 L) Tempest 420 V8
- Transmission: 3-speed manual Super Hydra-Matic

Dimensions
- Wheelbase: 124 in (3,150 mm)
- Length: 220.7 in (5,606 mm)
- Width: 80.7 in (2,050 mm)
- Curb weight: 4,086 lb (1,853 kg)

In its third year, the 1959 Bonneville became the senior series with the addition of the four-door hardtop sedan and Safari station wagon body styles, while the Pontiac Catalina became the junior series. The Bonneville played an important part that year in the introduction of two of Pontiac's greatest marketing inspirations — the split grille and the "Wide Track" slogan, introducing a front tread width of 63.7 in (1,618 mm) and rear tread width of 64 in (1,626 mm) as opposed to other GM products with a 61 in (1,549 mm) width for front and rear width. At the bottom of the rear quarters, a "skeg"—a downward fin—jutted outboard to counterbalance the rearward point of the quarter panel.

The Wide Track slogan was not just ad copy, either, as Pontiac pushed its wheels further out toward the fenders than anyone else and created what were considered to be the best-cornering full-size cars in the industry. Both the grille design and the Wide Track phrase remained part of Pontiac's image up to the brand's termination. A "Safe-T-Track" differential, used to minimize wheel spin, was an option beginning in 1959. As the platform expanded to add sedans and the Safari station wagons, they were also used as a basis for various specialty cars such as hearses.

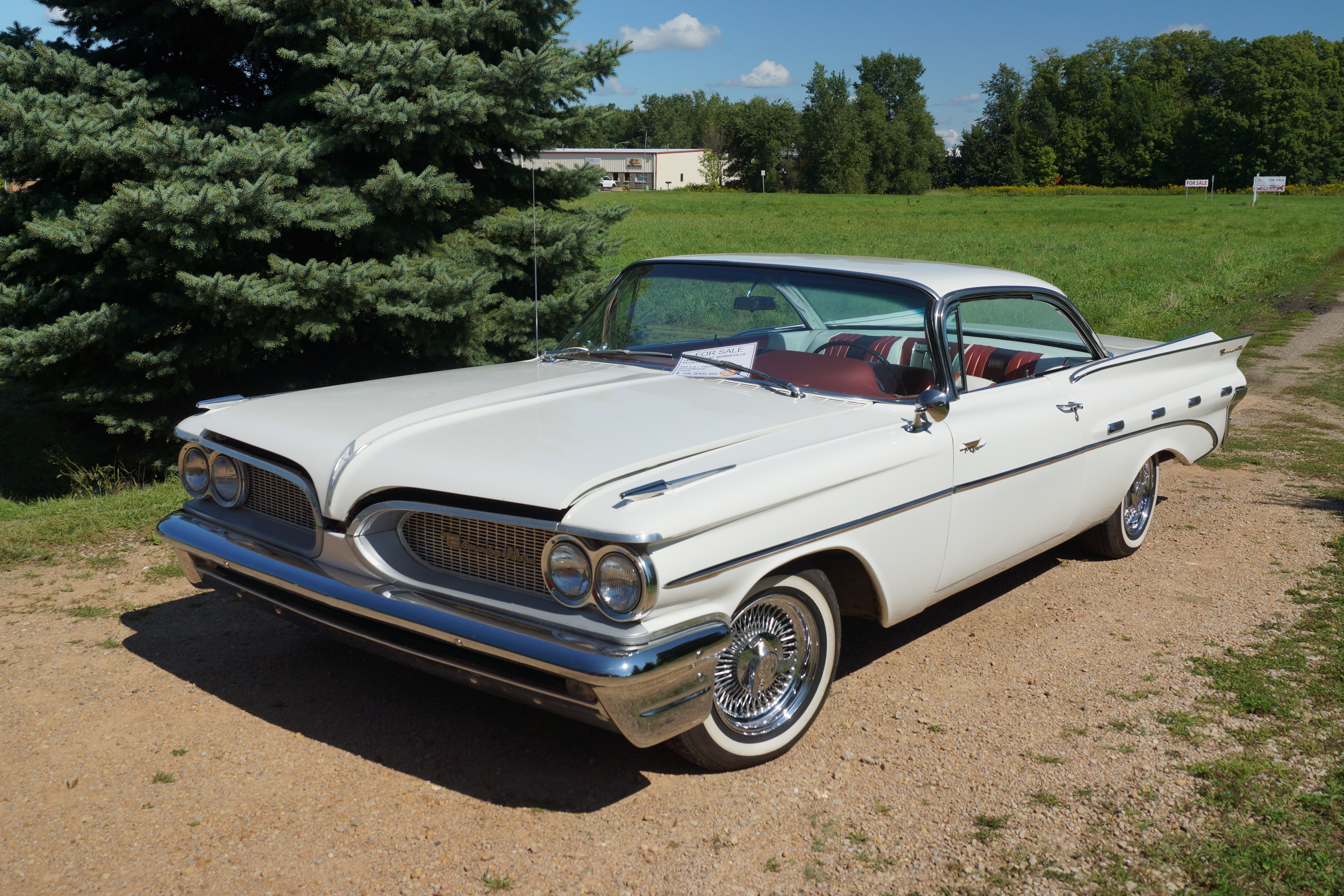
1959 Pontiac Bonneville Sports Coupe

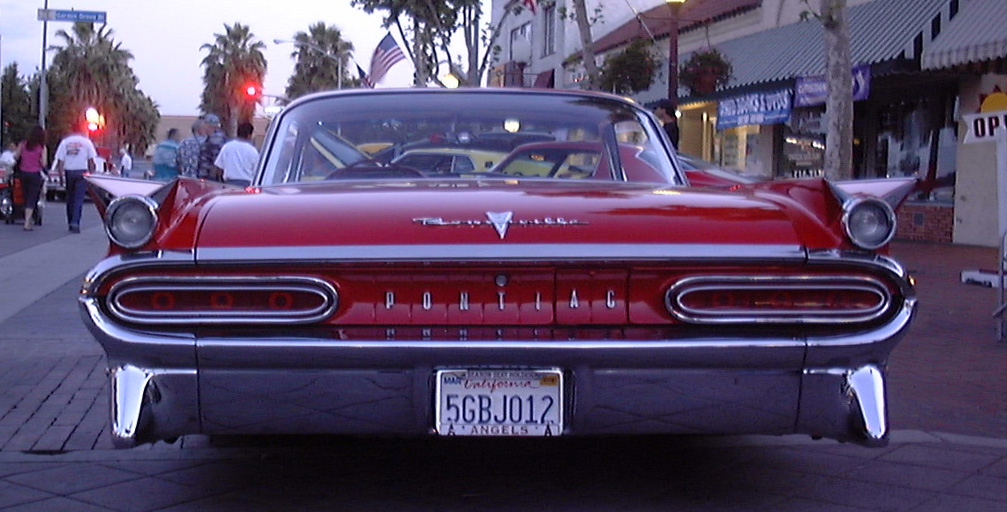
1959 Bonneville from the rear, showing double rear fins

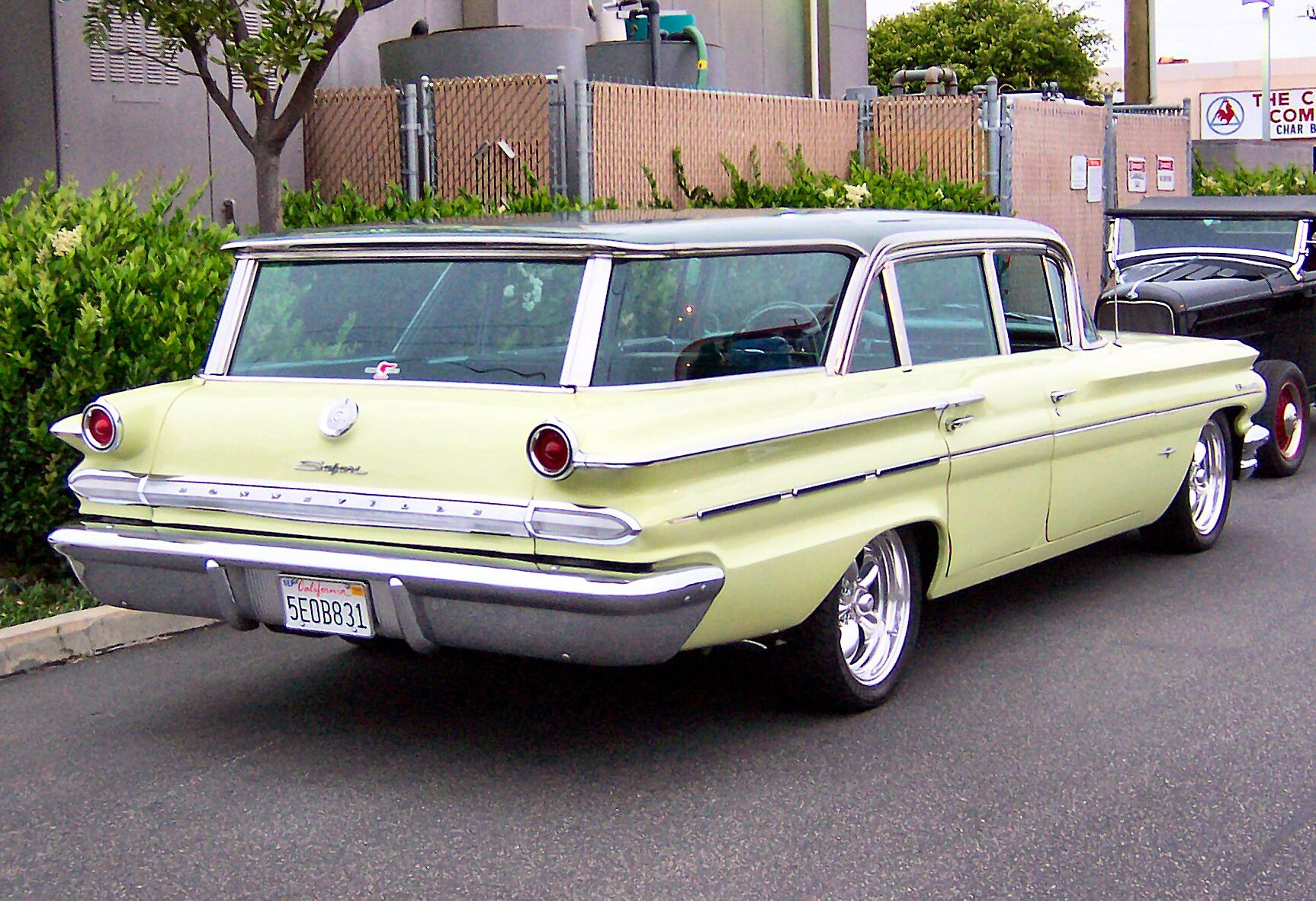
1960 Pontiac Bonneville Safari (with aftermarket wheels)

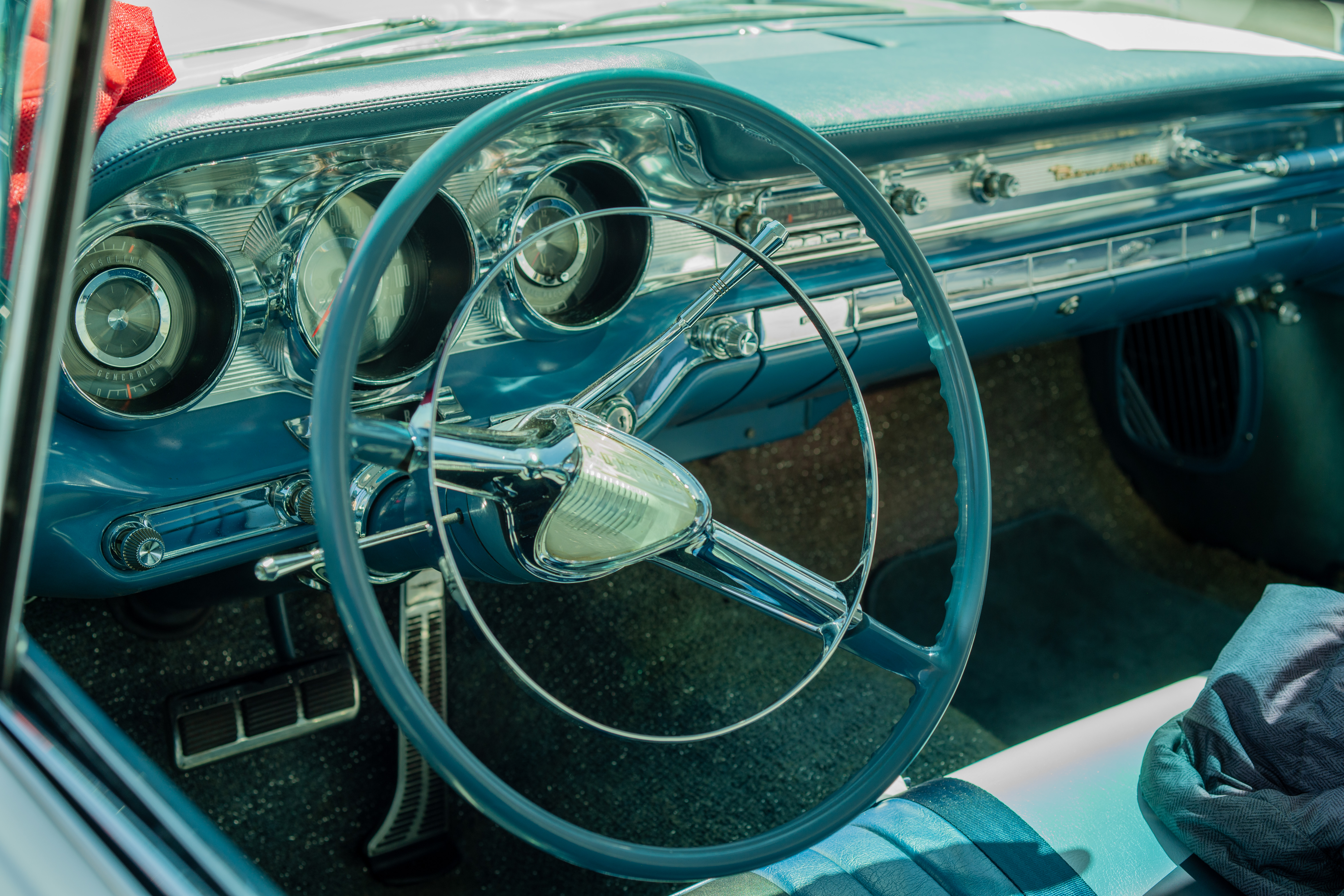
1959 Pontiac dashboard

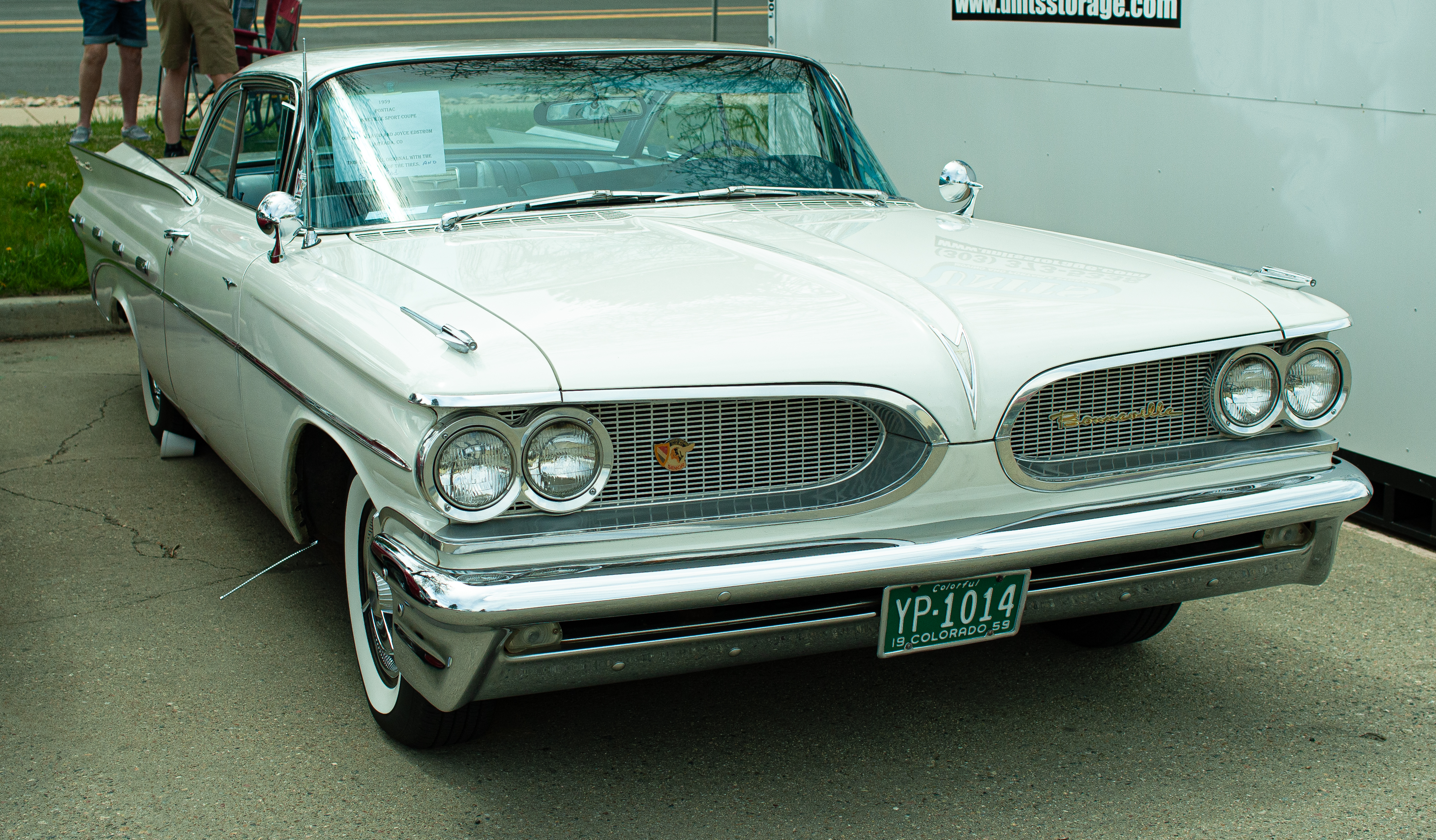
1959 Bonneville Coupe

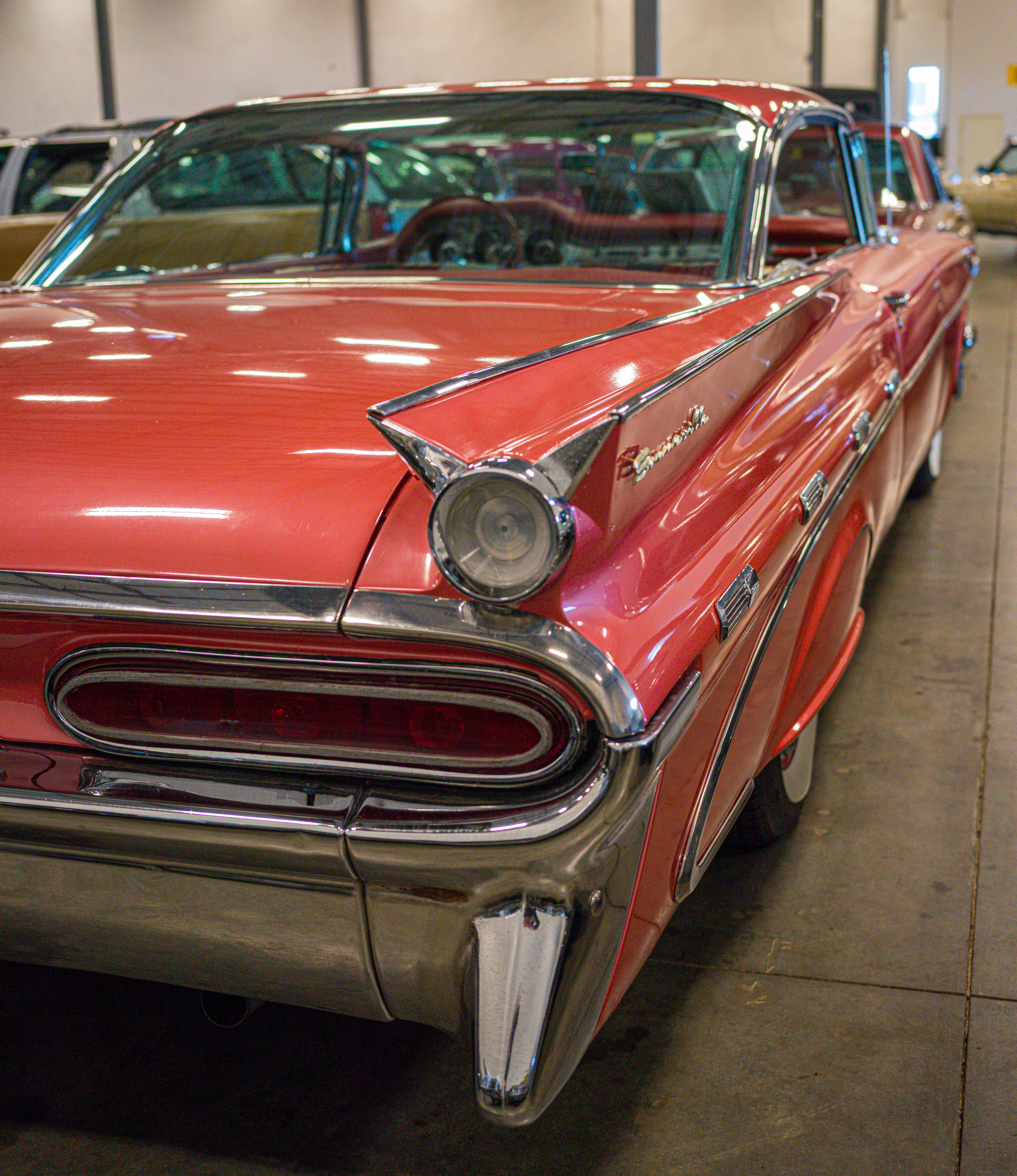
1959 Pontiac Bonneville in Sunset Glow Metallic

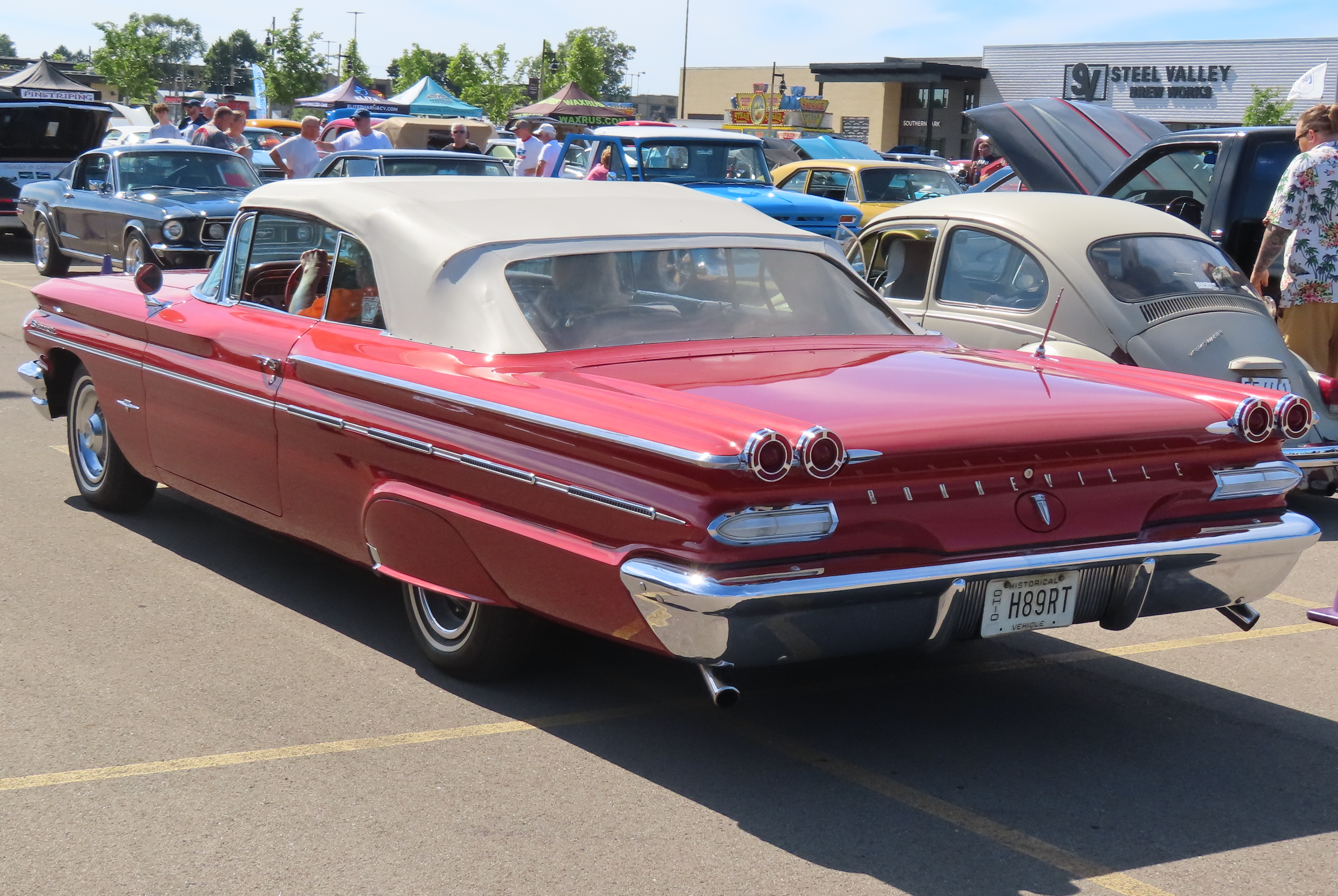
File:1960 Pontiac Bonneville Convertible Coupe, rear view

== Third generation (1961–1964) ==
Third generation
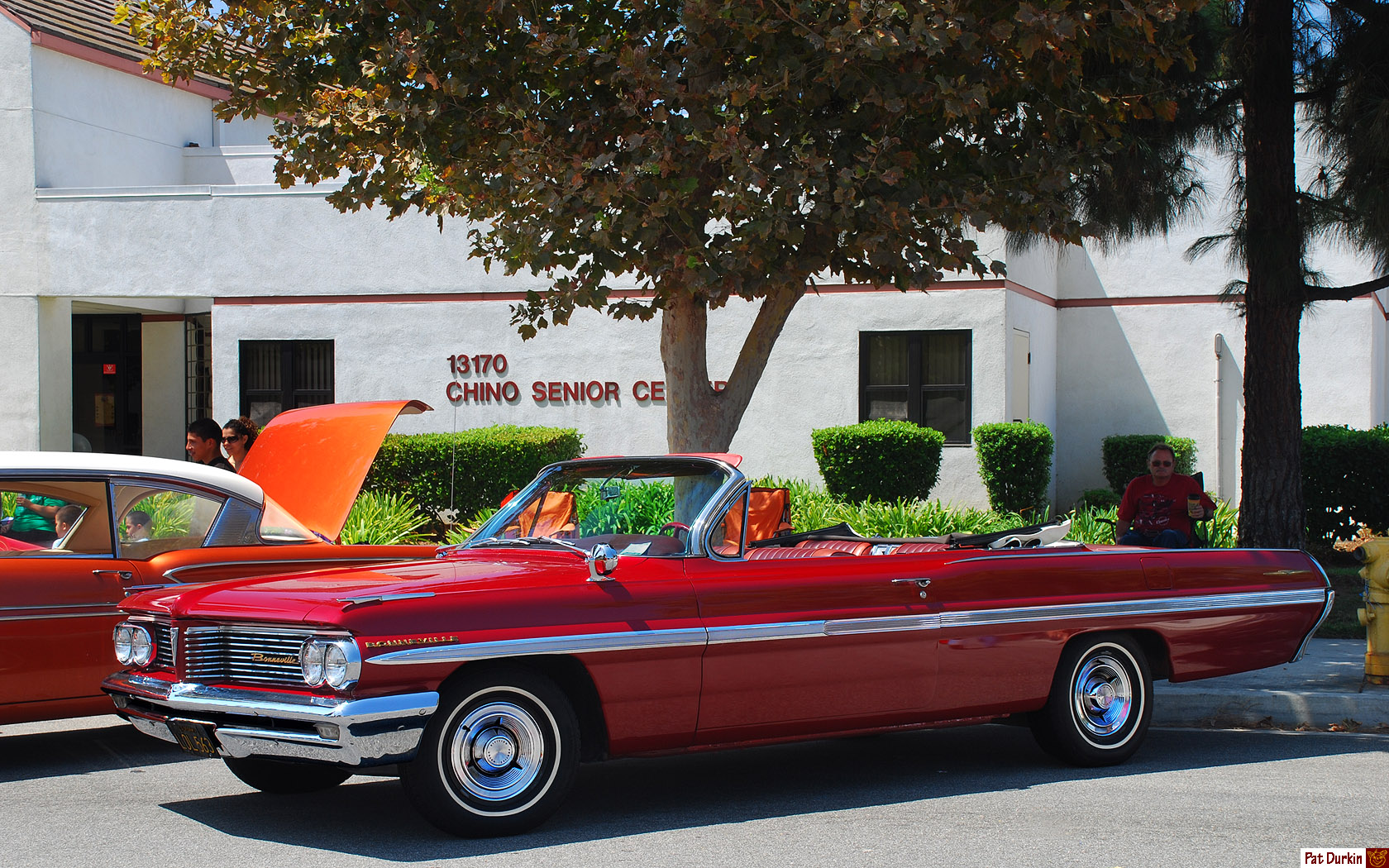
- 1962 Pontiac Bonneville convertible

Overview
- Model years: 1961–1964
- Assembly: (main plant); Pontiac, Michigan, United States (Pontiac Assembly) (branch assembly); Arlington, Texas, United States (Arlington Assembly); Doraville, Georgia, United States (Doraville Assembly); Kansas City, Kansas, United States (Fairfax Assembly); Linden, New Jersey, United States (Linden Assembly); South Gate, California, United States (South Gate Assembly); Wilmington, Delaware, United States (Wilmington Assembly)
- Designer: Bill Mitchell

Body and chassis
- Body style: 2-door convertible 2-door hardtop 4-door hardtop 4-door sedan 4-door station wagon
- Layout: FR layout
- Platform: B-body
- Related: Buick LeSabre; Chevrolet Impala; Oldsmobile Starfire

Powertrain
- Engine: 389 cu in (6.4 L) V8; 421 cu in (6.9 L) V8
- Transmission: 3-speed manual 4-speed manual Hydra-Matic

Dimensions
- Wheelbase: 123 in (3,124 mm)
- Length: 218.9 in (5,560 mm)
- Width: 78.7 in (1,999 mm)

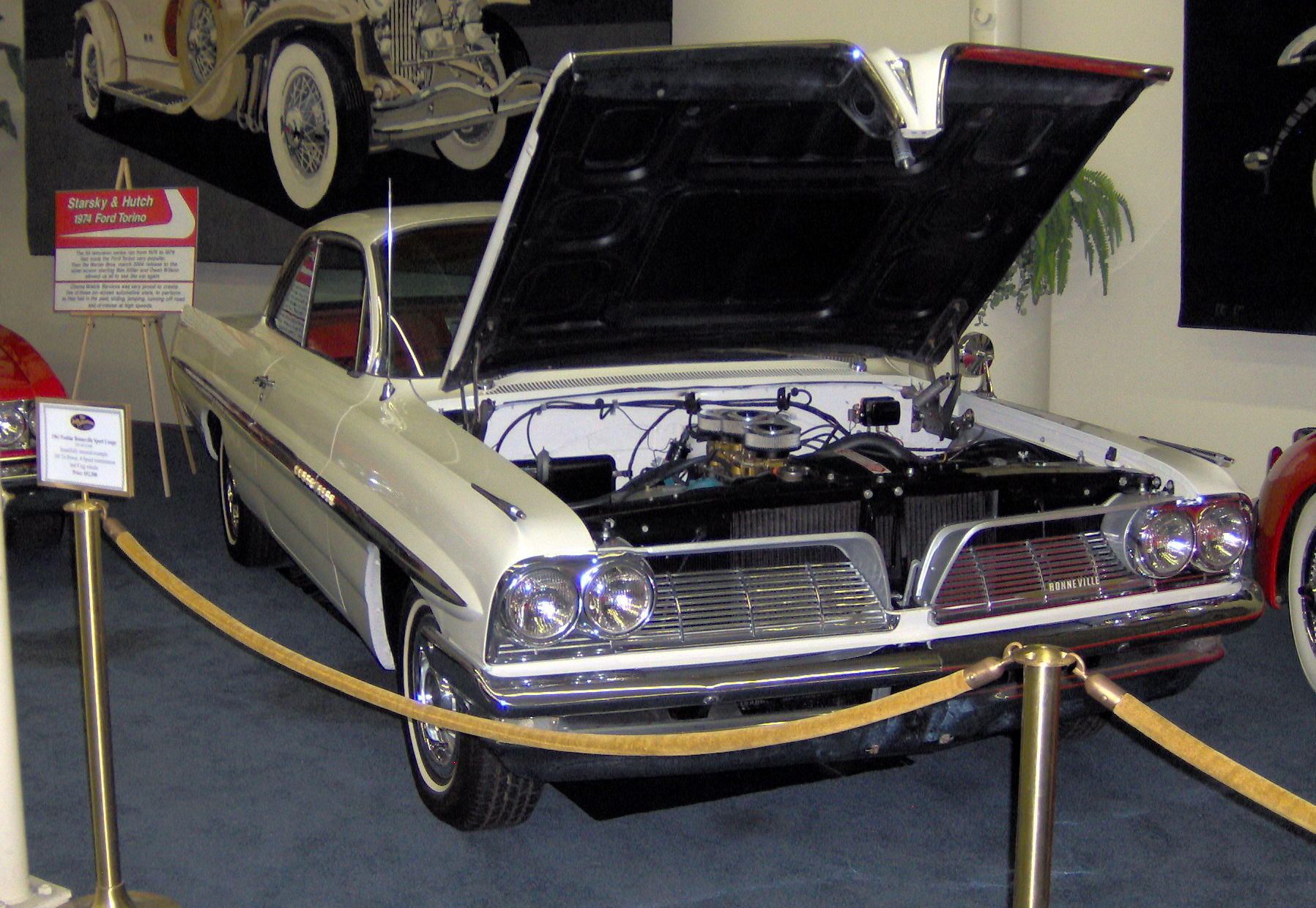
1961 Pontiac Bonneville Tri-Power Sports Coupe

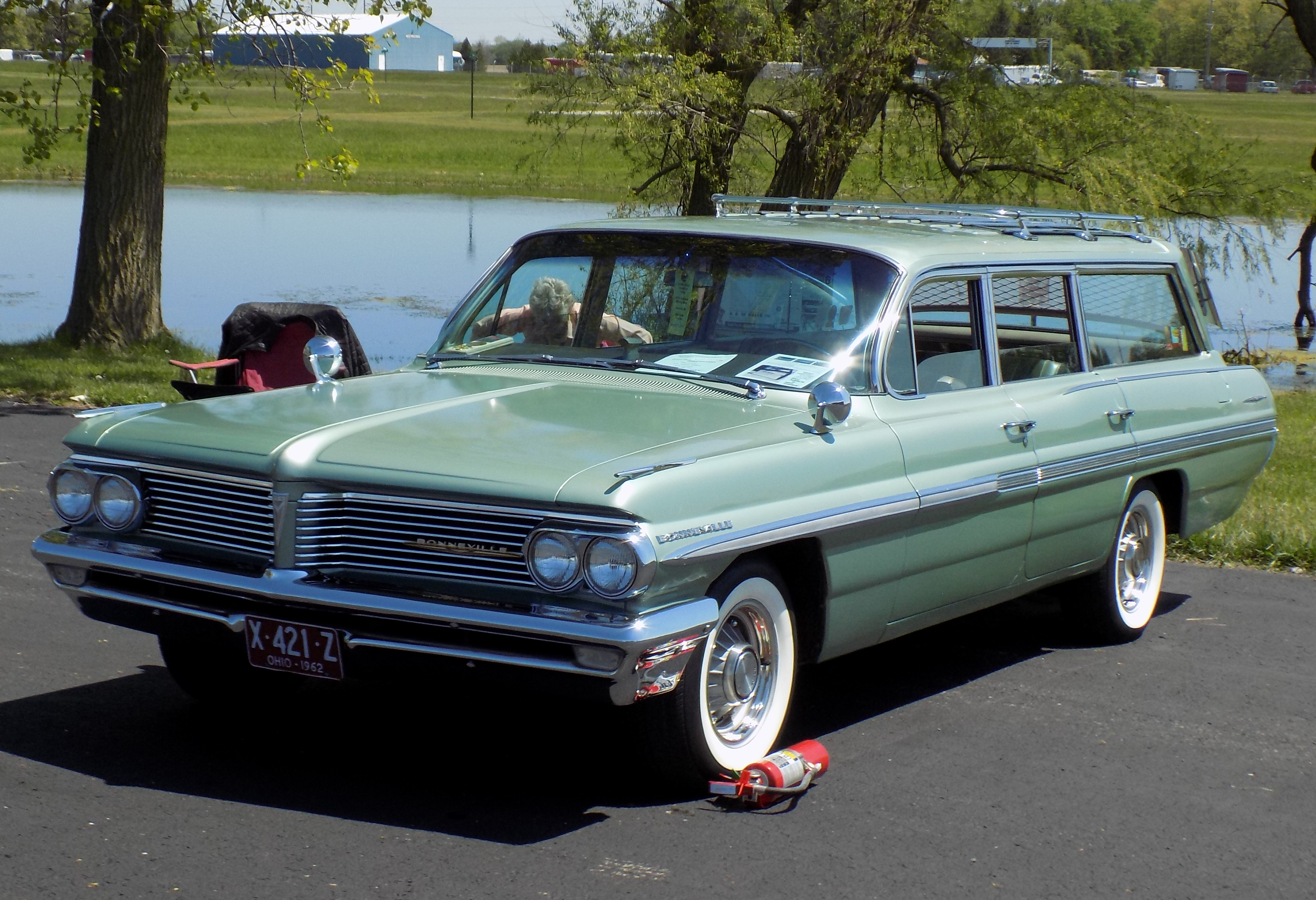
1962 Pontiac Bonneville Custom Safari

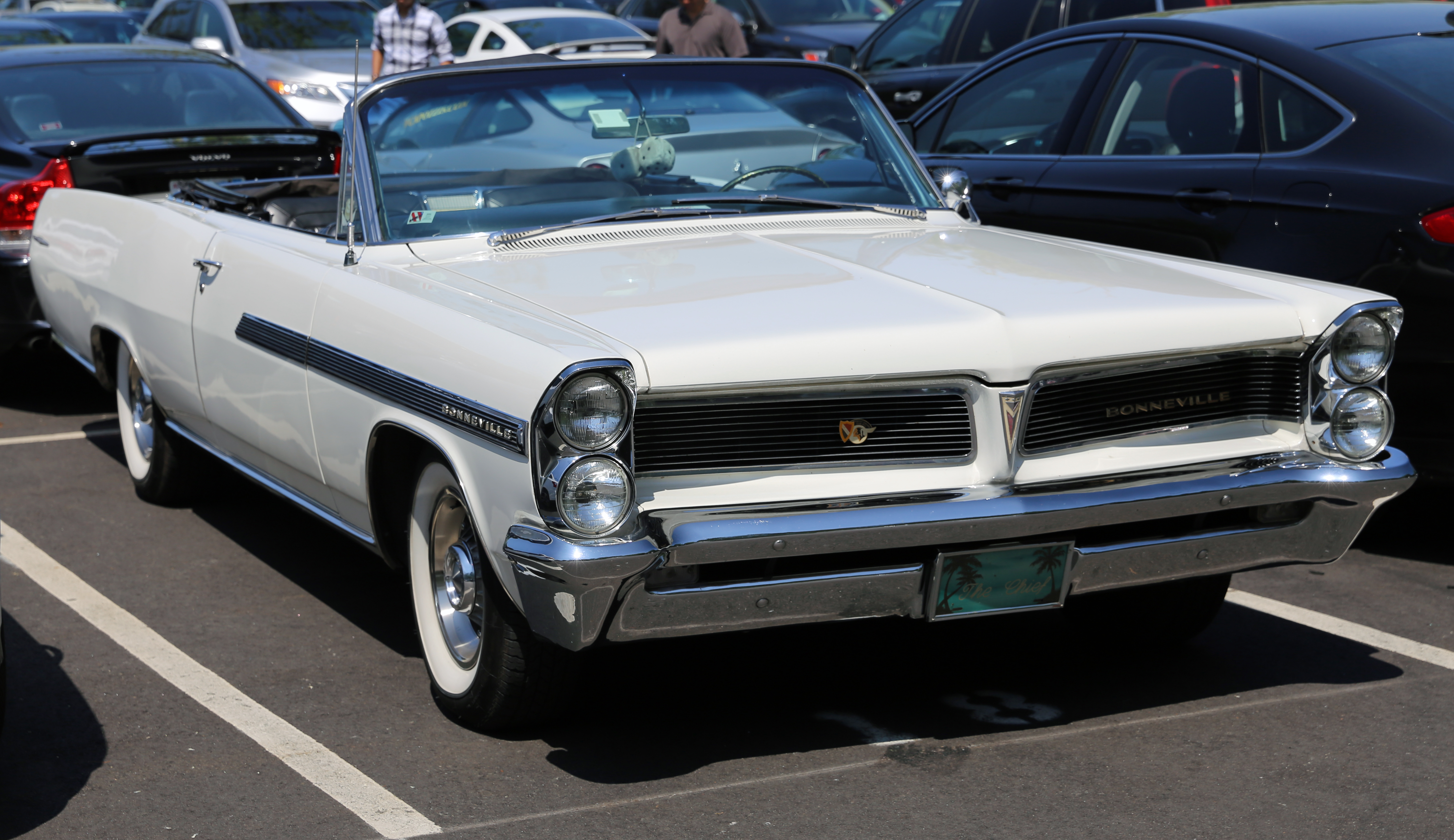
1963 Pontiac Bonneville convertible

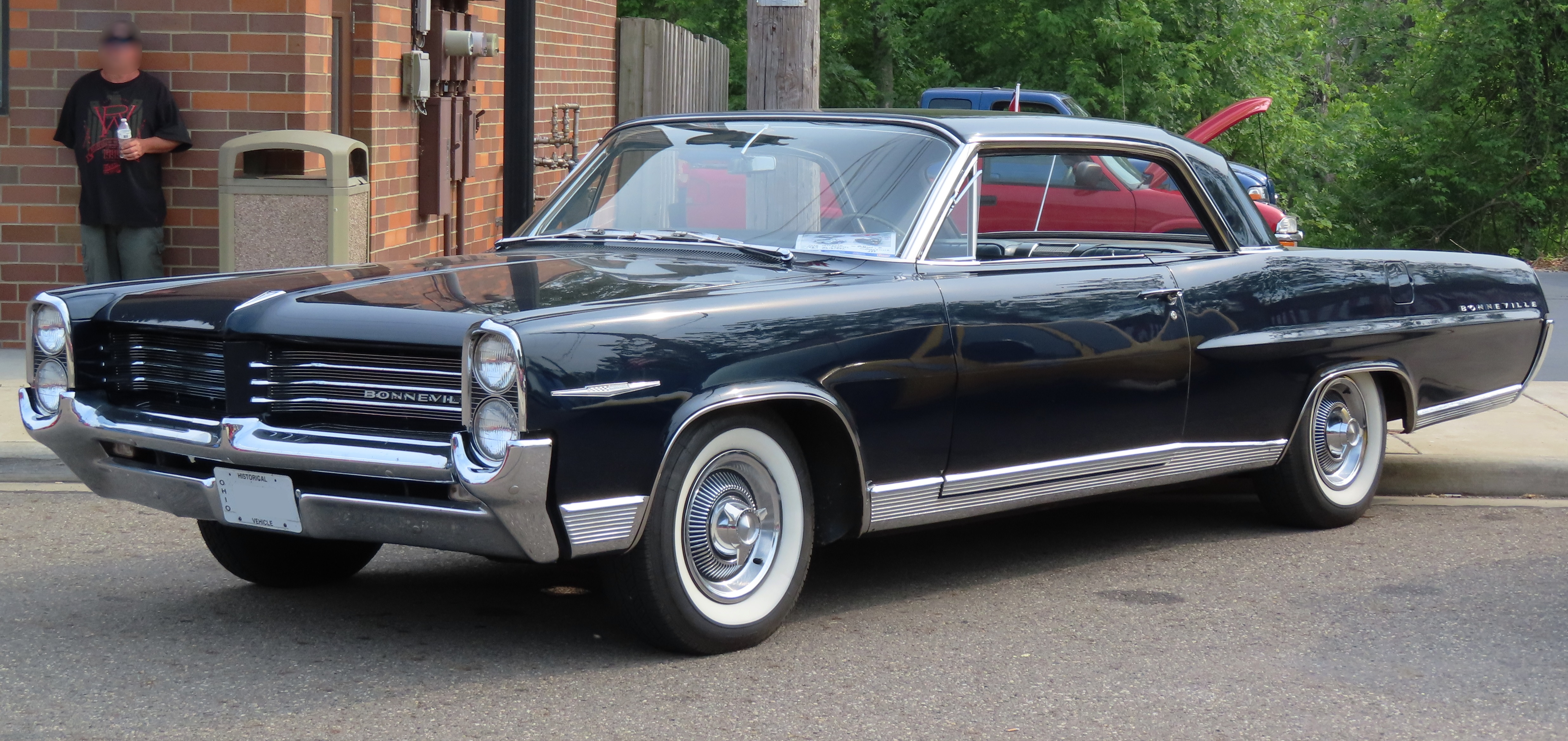
1964 Pontiac Bonneville Sports Coupe

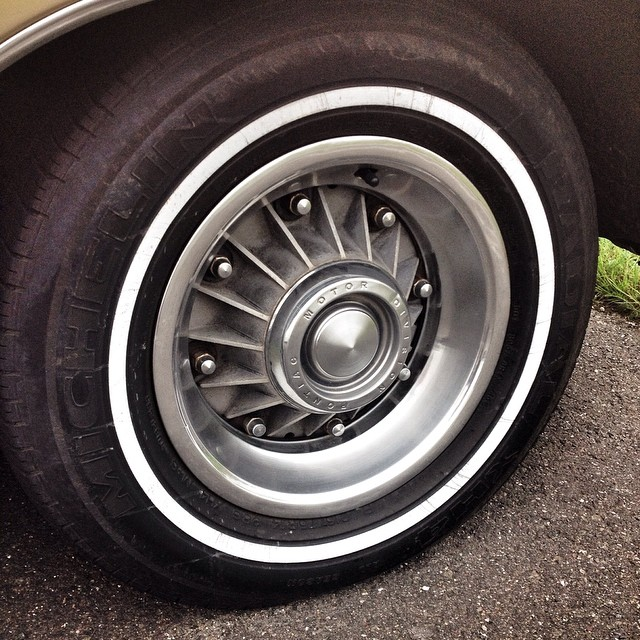
Pontiac eight-lug rim. Full-size Pontiacs from 1960 to 1968 were available with these unique, eight-bolt rims with exposed finned-aluminum brake drums which aided brake cooling compared to the standard iron drum enclosed by a steel wheel.

The Bonneville was Pontiac's senior model throughout the 1960s and was instrumental in pushing Pontiac to third place in sales from 1962 to 1970.

The distinctive protruding grille made its appearance on all Pontiac products during the early 1960s, and was a modern revival of a similar appearance on Pontiac products during the 1930s and early 1940s, as demonstrated on the Pontiac Torpedo.

The Bonneville differed from its lesser Catalina and Star Chief counterparts by featuring more luxurious interior trim with upgraded cloth and "Morrokide" vinyl or expanded "Morrokide" upholstery in sedans and coupes, expanded "Morrokide" in Safari wagons and genuine leather seating in convertibles. Bonnevilles (with the exception of Bonneville Safari station wagons) were also (along with Star Chiefs) built on a longer wheelbase version of GM's B-Body. The 1962 hardtop coupe had a listed retail price of $3,349 ($35,645 in 2025 dollars).

In 1962, the Bonneville coupe was offered along with the all new Pontiac Grand Prix which has the same luxurious interior of the Bonneville on the shorter Catalina wheelbase, and the Grand Prix was slightly more expensive and exclusive.

For a luxurious appearance, the Bonneville came with instrument panels and door panels with walnut veneer trim, carpeted lower door panels, grab bar on the passenger side of the dash and courtesy lights and a rear arm rest. Beginning in 1964, a Bonneville Brougham option package was available that included an even more luxurious interior trim level with front and rear seats featuring center armrests, upgraded door panels and a standard Cordova (vinyl) roof with "Brougham" nameplates. The two-door hardtop was marketed as the "Sports Coupe", the four door pillarless models were called "Vistas".

Bonneville models were standard equipped with Hydra-Matic (through 1964) or Turbo Hydra-Matic (1965-on) automatic transmissions. Options included power steering and power brakes as well as air conditioning. Other popular options included power windows, power seats, radio, cruise control, and 8-lug aluminum wheels that included integral brake drums for improved stopping power.

The Bonneville also had more powerful standard V8 engines than other full-sized Pontiacs, including the 389 cu in (6.4 L) or 400 cu in (6.6 L) V8s with four-barrel carburetors (power ratings of 303 to 340 hp (226 to 254 kW) depending on year) with many optional V8 offerings, such as the availability of the Tri-Power (three two-barrel carburetor) options on both the 389 cu in (6.4 L) and 421 cu in (6.9 L) V8s that offered up to 376 hp (280 kW) through 1966.

For 1963 only, Pontiac offered the 421 cu in (6.9 L) Super Duty with two four-barrel carburetors, rated at 425 hp (317 kW), as a US$2,250 option ($23,357 in 2025 dollars) whereas the base Bonneville was listed at US$3,349 ($35,219 in 2025 dollars).

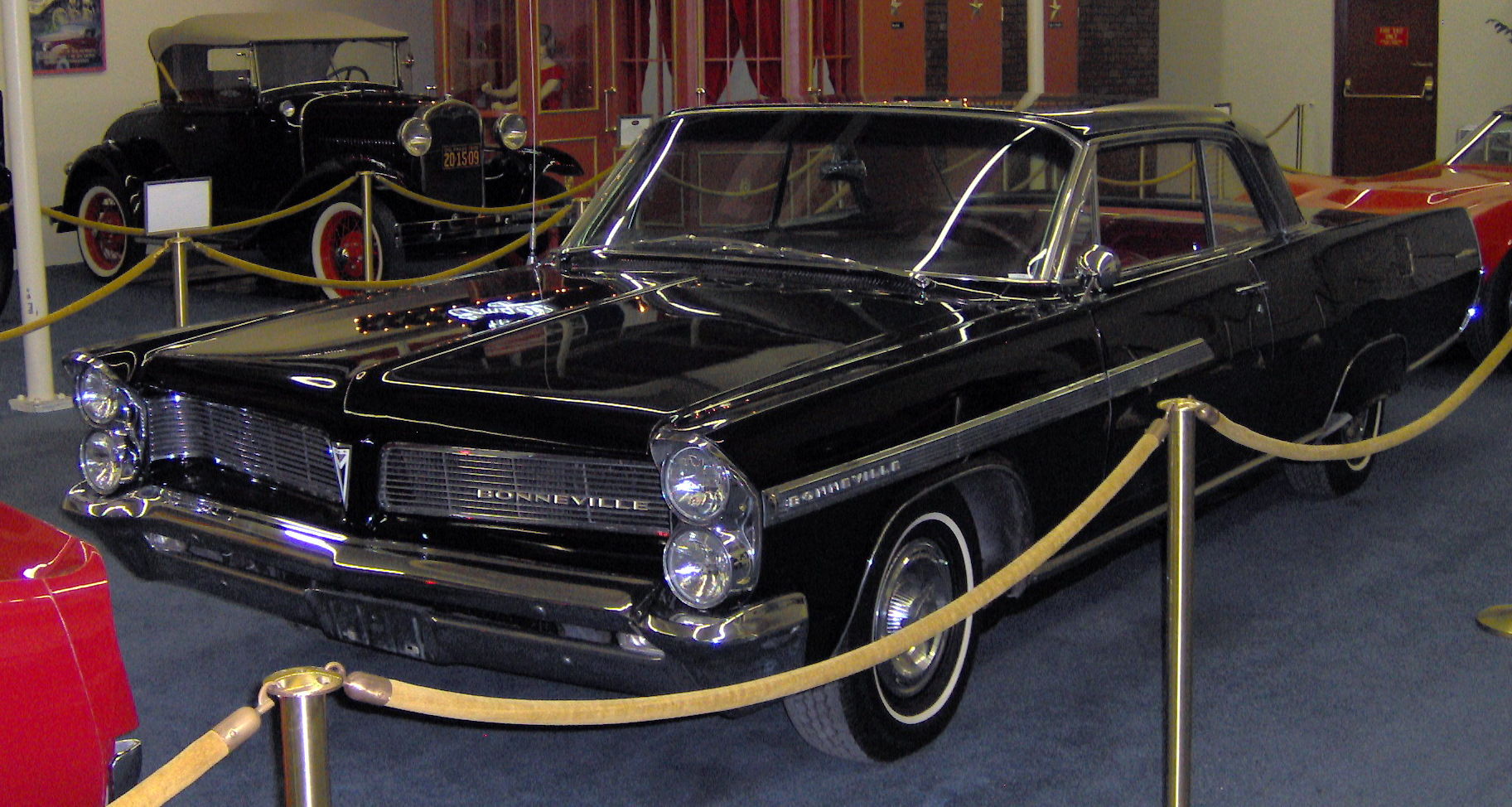
1963 Pontiac Bonneville sport coupe

== Fourth generation (1965–1970) ==
Fourth generation
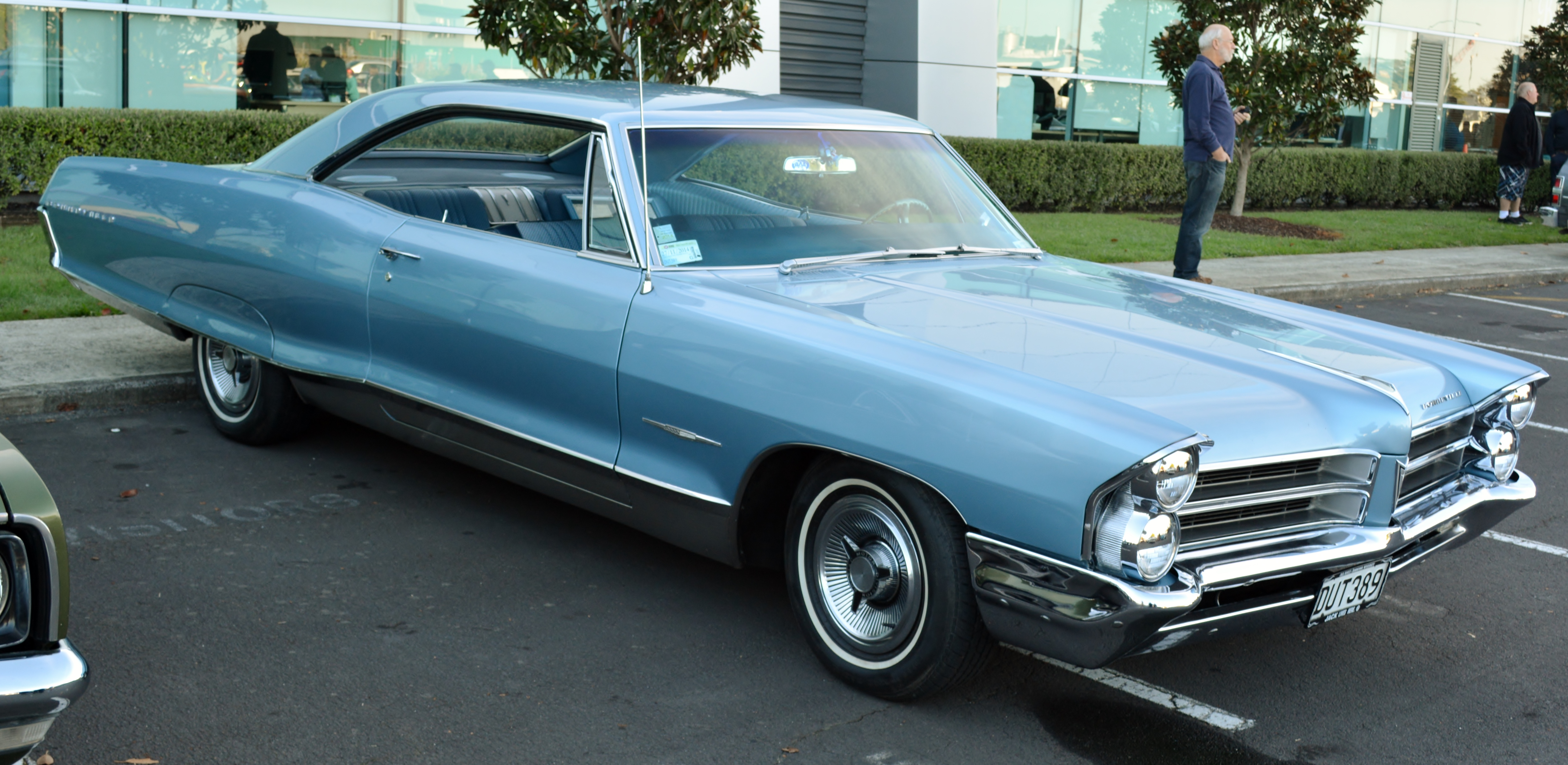
- 1965 Pontiac Bonneville 2-Door Hardtop

Overview
- Model years: 1965–1970
- Assembly: (main plant); Pontiac, Michigan, United States (Pontiac Assembly) (branch assembly); Arlington, Texas, United States (Arlington Assembly); Doraville, Georgia, United States (Doraville Assembly); Kansas City, Kansas, United States (Fairfax Assembly); Linden, New Jersey, United States (Linden Assembly); South Gate, California, United States (South Gate Assembly)
- Designer: Bill Mitchell

Body and chassis
- Body style: 2-door convertible 2-door hardtop 4-door hardtop 4-door sedan 4-door station wagon
- Layout: FR layout
- Platform: B-body
- Related: Buick LeSabre; Chevrolet Impala; Oldsmobile Dynamic 88

Powertrain
- Engine: 389 cu in (6.4 L) V8; 421 cu in (6.9 L) V8; 400 cu in (6.6 L) V8; 428 cu in (7.0 L) V8; 455 cu in (7.5 L) V8
- Transmission: 3-speed synchromesh manual 4-speed synchromesh manual 3-speed Turbo-Hydramatic 400 automatic

Dimensions
- Wheelbase: 1965-68: 124 in (3,150 mm); 1969-70: 125 in (3,175 mm)
- Length: 1965-68: 222.6 in (5,654 mm); 1969-70: 223.5 in (5,677 mm)
- Width: 79.7 in (2,024 mm)
- Height: 54.3 in (1,379 mm)

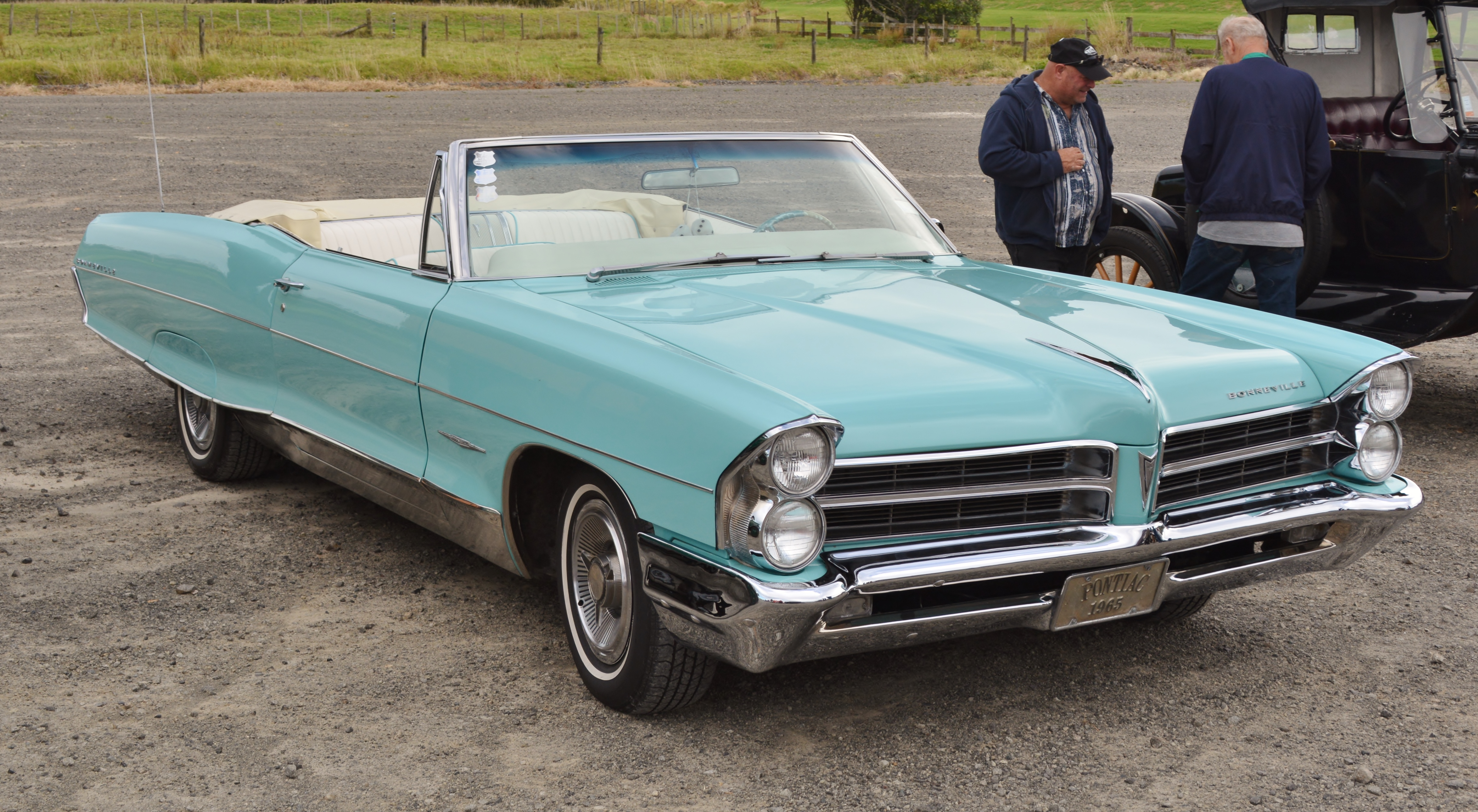
1965 Pontiac Bonneville Convertible

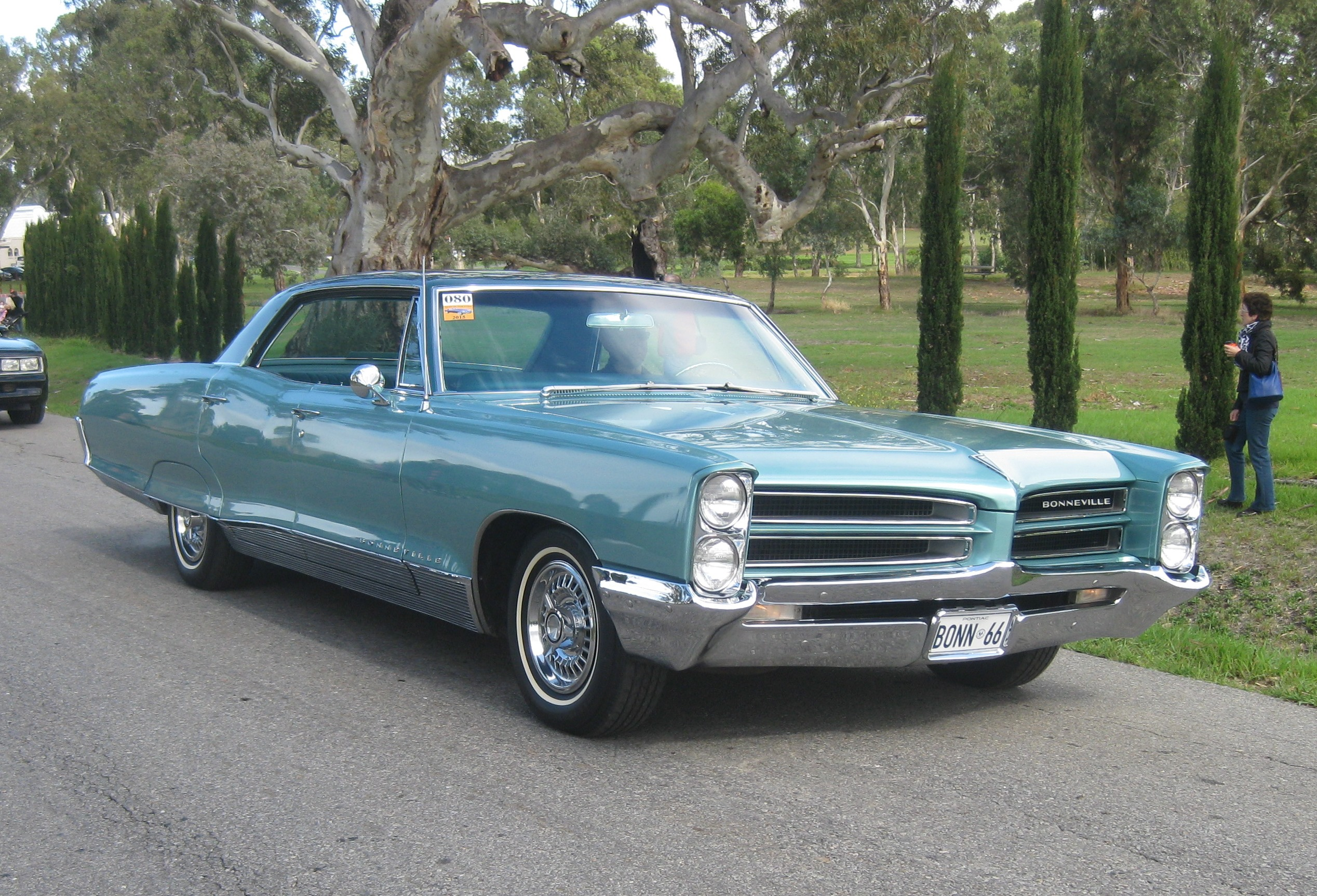
1966 Pontiac Bonneville 4-Door Hardtop

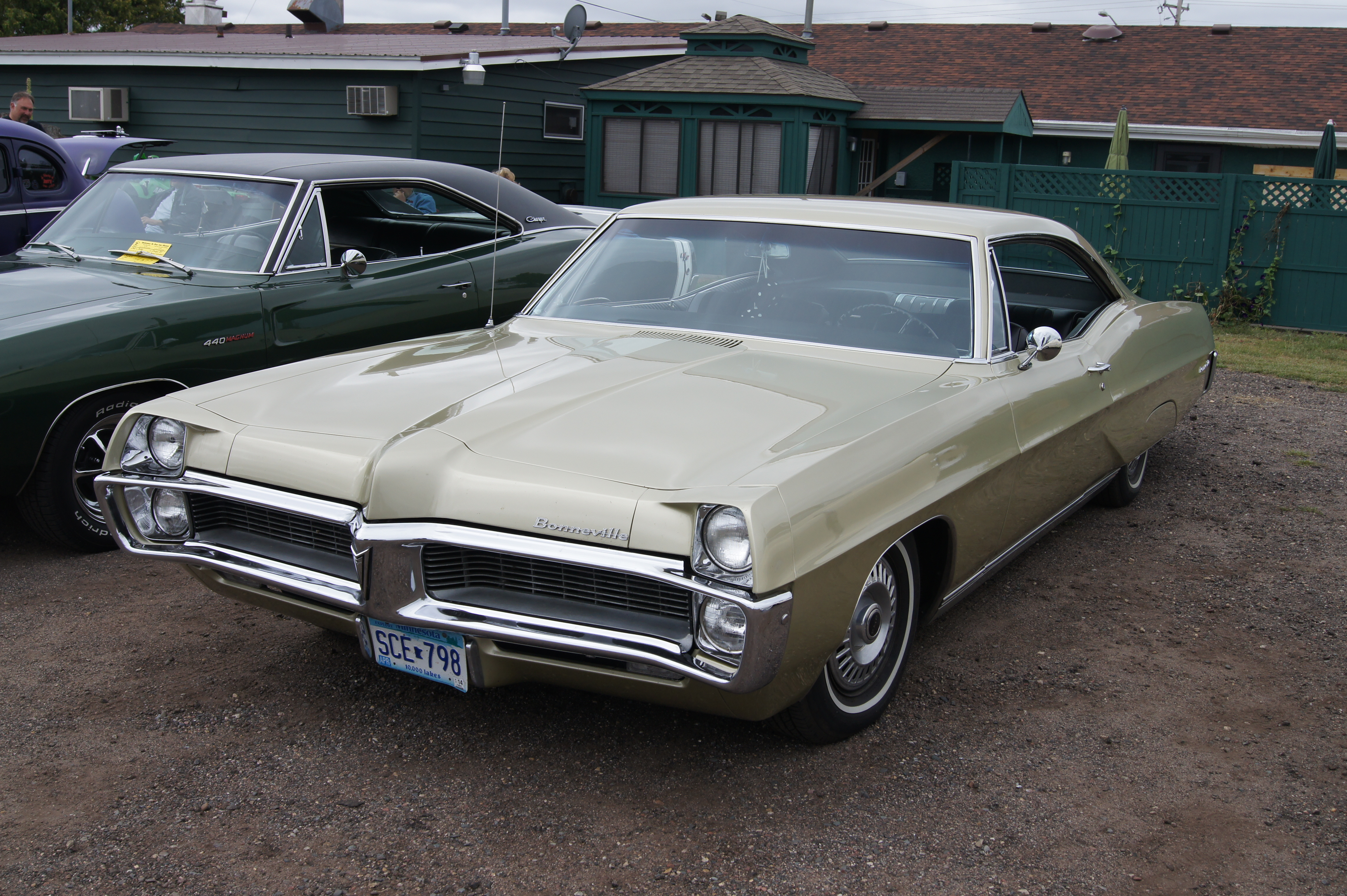
1967 Pontiac Bonneville Hardtop Coupe

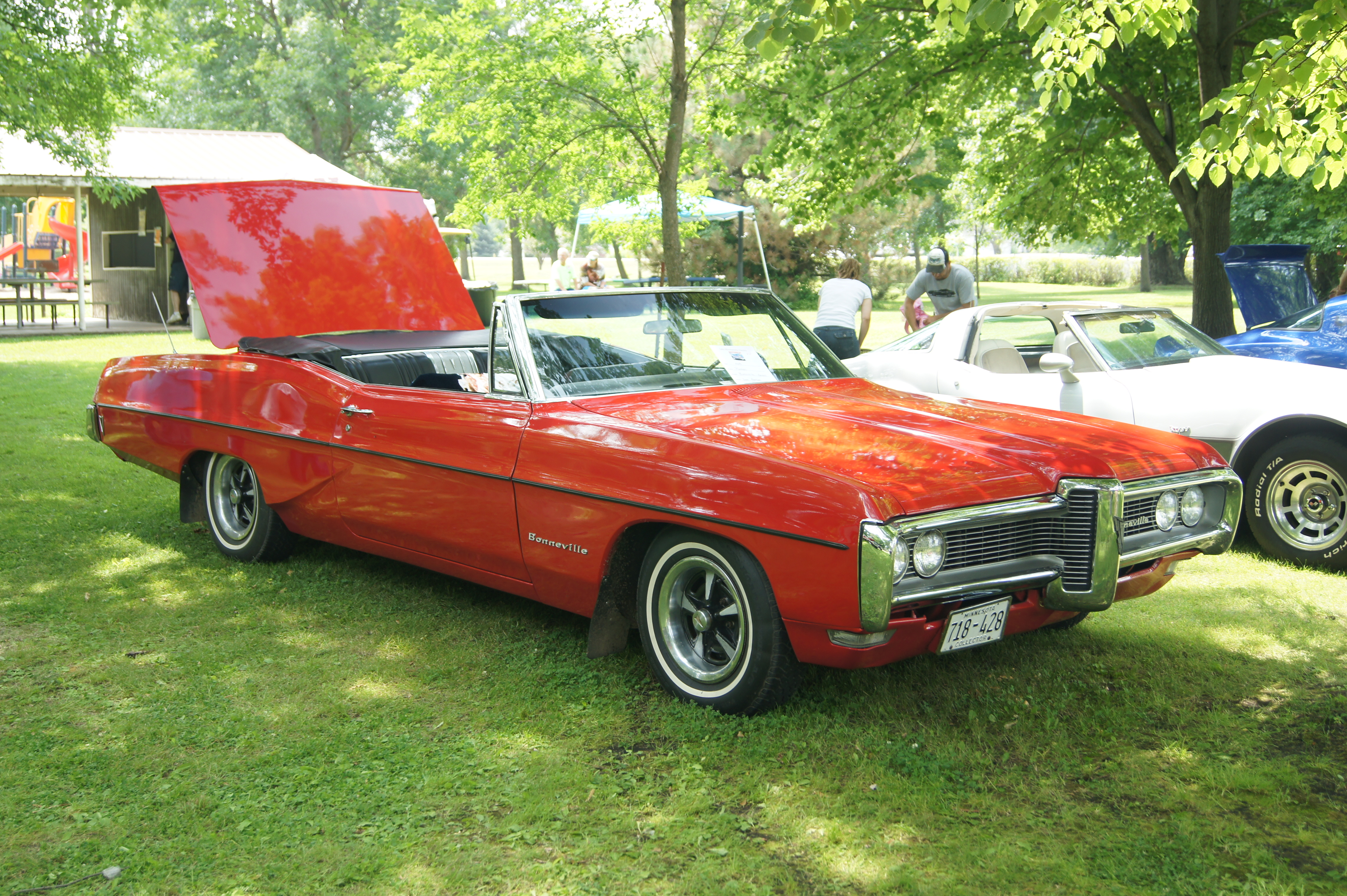
1968 Pontiac Bonneville convertible

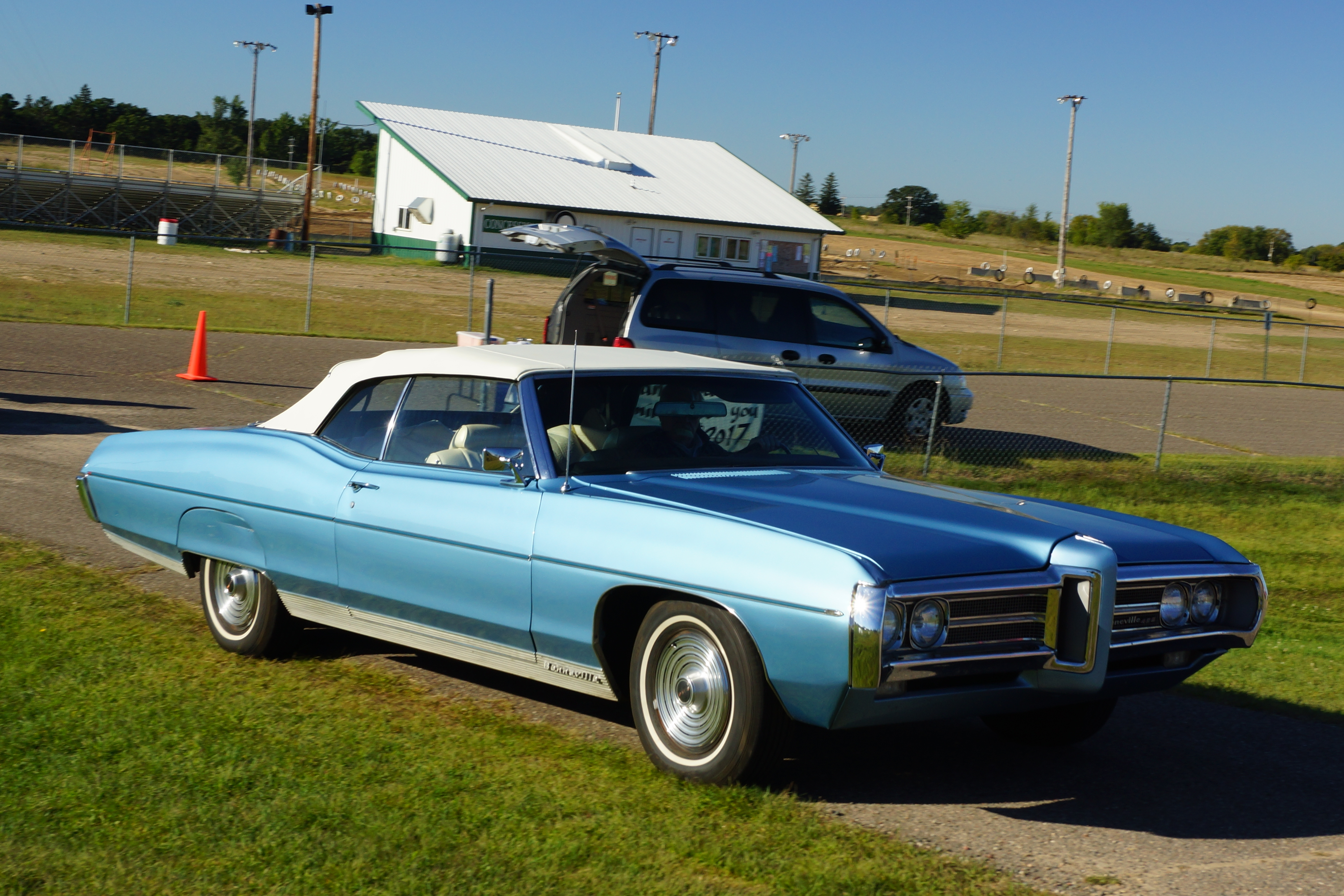
1969 Pontiac Bonneville convertible

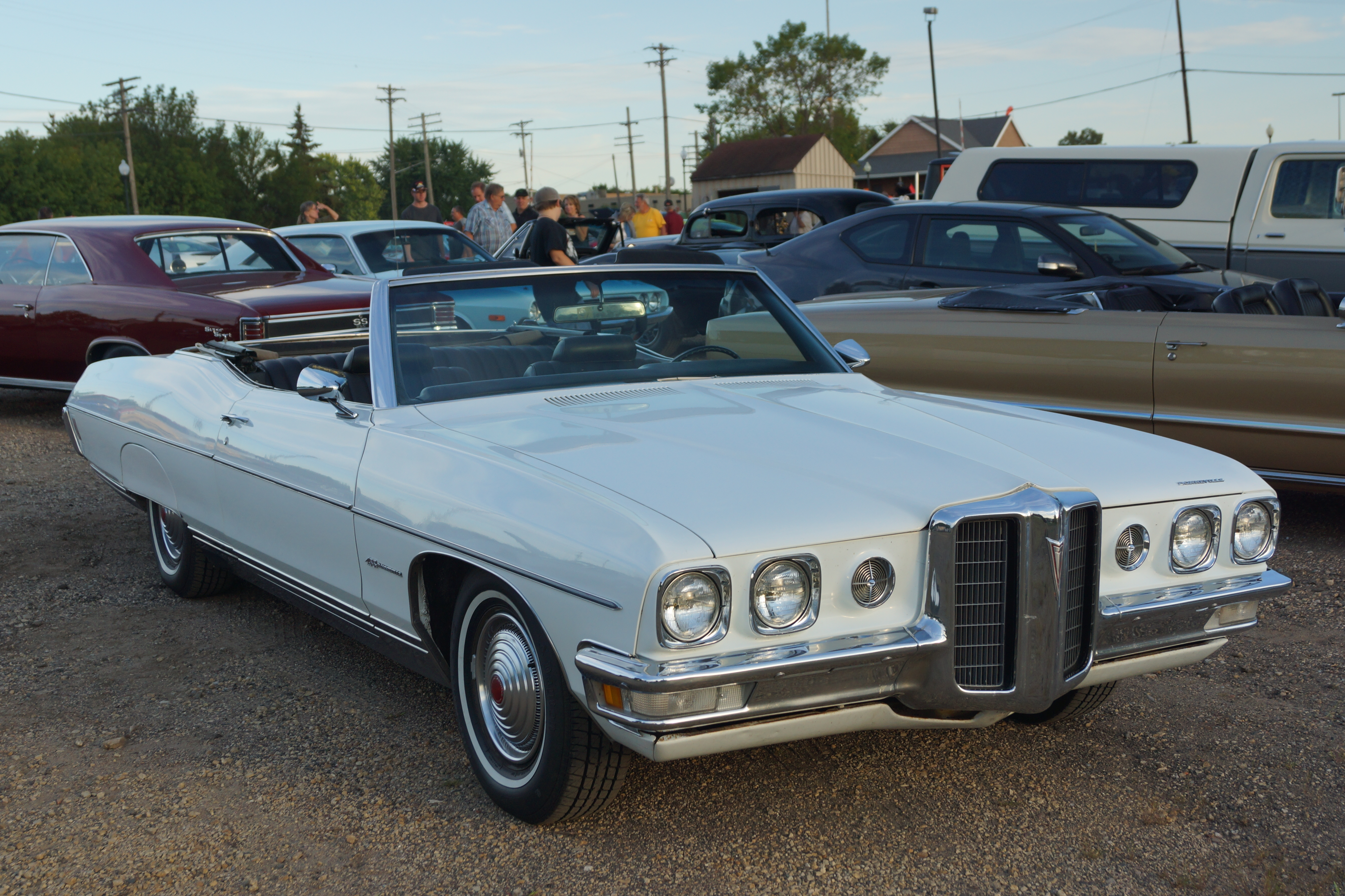
1970 Pontiac Bonneville Convertible

In 1965, B-Body Pontiacs received a dramatic restyle, featuring fastback rooflines on coupes, rakish fender lines, and even more pronounced "Coke bottle styling". Bonnevilles followed largely the same styling cues as on other 1965 Pontiacs, but was 8 inches longer thanks to its new 124-inch wheelbase chassis. The interior featured new instrumentation and dashboard styling as well as new upholstery. This series Bonneville retained the longer wheelbase over the Grand Prix but the hardtop coupe was priced lower at $3,288 ($33,592 in 2025 dollars) and was not offered the center console included in the Grand Prix. This generation also introduced fender skirts over the rear wheels for an upscale look, shared with Cadillac, Buick and Oldsmobile senior models.

Engine options remained unchanged from the 1964 model year, with a 389 cu in (6.4 L), 333 hp unit being standard, equipped with a Carter AFB 4-barrel carburetor. A 421 cu in (6.9 L) engine was an optional upgrade. Both engines had choices of Tri-Power multi-carburetion setups and higher compression ratios.

New for Pontiacs in 1965 was GM's Turbo-Hydramatic 400 transmission, which was released the year prior. This new 3-speed unit had a torque converter, unlike the old fluid-coupling based Super-Hydramatic featured on past Bonneville models. The new transmission also changed the shift pattern from "P-N-D-S-L-R" to a safer and ultimately more modern "P-R-N-D-S-L."

In 1965, Pontiac Motor Division received the Motor Trend "Car of the Year" award. As part of this award, Motor Trend reviewed GTO, Grand Prix, Catalina 2+2 and Bonneville.

In 1966, the Bonneville featured a minor update, with new front and rear sheet metal, trim and bright work. The interior saw some updates, including a more squared-up dashboard and minor changes in instrumentation. Powertrain components were the same as 1965.

The Bonneville for 1967 received a major update over the previous years. Styling was changed dramatically and featured a new grille-in-bumper front design, more creases to accentuate the "Coke bottle" styling and an updated rear fascia. The interior featured a new wraparound-style dash with new switchgear, instrumentation and trim. As per the up-and-coming US Title 49 legislation, 67' Bonnevilles were equipped with seatbelts as standard, as well as other government mandated safety equipment.

1967 also saw a large powertrain and chassis refresh for Pontiac. The 389 cubic inch plant was replaced with 400 cu in (6.6 L) one, and the 421 cubic inch plant was replaced with a 428 cu in (7.0 L) one. As per GM's internal edict, the multi-carburation setups found on earlier cars were replaced with the new Quadra Jet "spread bore" carburetor. Carter AFB carburetors were still standard, but the Quadra Jet was featured as the new "High performance" upgrade. A myriad of horsepower ratings were optional. A dual-circuit master cylinder was standard as per legislation and disc brakes became an optional extra.

1968 saw a large styling update for Bonneville. The front fascia was heavily revised with new side-by-side headlights, however, the side and rear styling stayed largely the same from 1967. The interior saw some minor updates to styling with less chrome, as well as an available 8-Track Tape player.

Power was upgraded to 340 horsepower on the base 400 CI engine, up from 333 on the 1967 model year, the 428 CI engine remained an option

In 1969, the rest of the Bonneville's styling was updated. The front fascia stayed similar to 68', however, the rest of the car saw a restyle. The creases on the side were removed and the overall "Coke Bottle" effect was lessened. The rear end saw widened taillights and a color coded bumper insert. The interior saw even more updates, featuring more padding, wood trim and a slanted dashboard.

Power trains were upgraded to a standard 360 hp 428 CI engine.

1970 saw the most dramatic update to styling for Bonneville, featuring an entirely new front fascia, with more square features and an updated vertical twin grille design. Wrap around amber turn signals were integrated into the lower bumper. Side body lines remained similar to the 69' model year, however the rear design was completely revised with lowered tail lights and bumper, with a design more similar to that of 65' and 66' model years than those directly prior.

The interior was similar to the 1969 model year, retaining the slanted design and minimal chrome trim.

A new 455 cu in (7.5 L) V8 was made standard for the 1970 model year, with the 400 CI engine being an option.

== Fifth generation (1971–1976) ==
Fifth generation
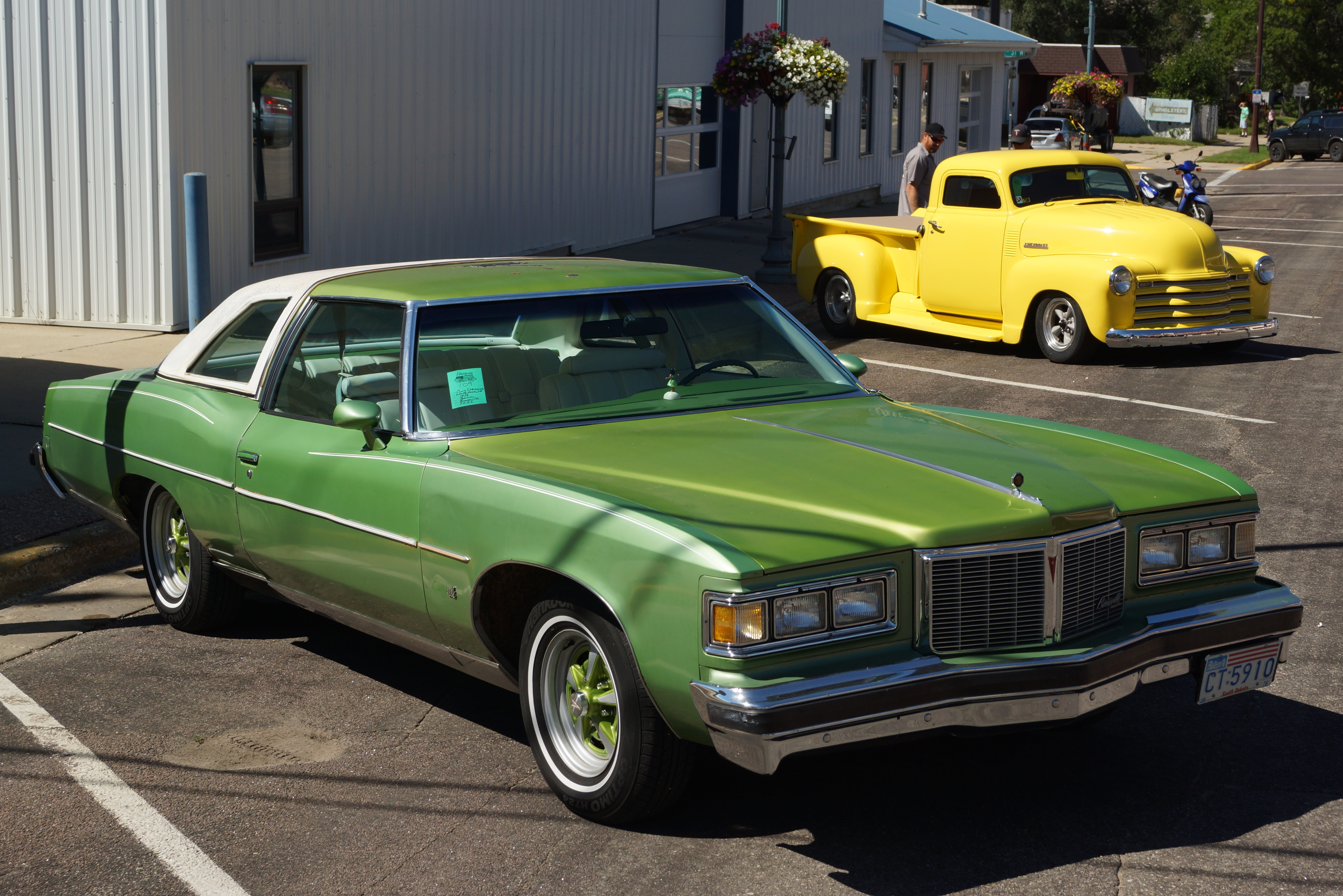
- '76 Bonneville coupe

Overview
- Model years: 1971–1976
- Assembly: (main plant); Pontiac, Michigan, United States (Pontiac Assembly) (branch assembly); Kansas City, Kansas, United States (Fairfax Assembly); South Gate, California, United States (South Gate Assembly)
- Designer: Bill Mitchell

Body and chassis
- Body style: 4-door hardtop 2-door coupe 4-door sedan
- Layout: FR layout
- Platform: B-body
- Related: Buick LeSabre; Oldsmobile 88; Pontiac Catalina/Laurentian; Chevrolet Impala

Powertrain
- Engine: 455 cu in (7.5 L) V8; 400 cu in (6.6 L) V8

Dimensions
- Wheelbase: 126 in (3,200 mm) (1971-72); 124 in (3,150 mm) (1973-74); 123.4 in (3,134 mm) (1975-76)
- Length: 226.2 in (5,745 mm)
- Width: 79.5 in (2,019 mm)

For 1971, the Bonneville was downgraded in the model hierarchy, as a new top-line Grand Ville series was introduced. In effect, it replaced the discontinued Executive above the lower-priced Catalina. The Bonneville had new "Monocoque" styling and was offered in three body styles, a pillared four-door sedan, four-door hardtop sedan and two-door hardtop coupe. The standard engine for 1971-72 was a 455 cubic-inch V8 with two-barrel carburetor that was rated at 280 gross horsepower for 1971 and 185 net horsepower for 1972 and optionally available was the four-barrel version of the 455 rated at 325 gross horsepower in 1971 and 250 net horsepower in 1972. The on-paper power ratings reflect the change in power measurement undertaken by the industry for 1972. 1971 was also the first year for Pontiac and other GM divisions to reduce compression ratios on all engines across the board to operate on lower-octane regular leaded, low-lead or unleaded gasoline, reflecting a corporate edict anticipating the introduction of catalytic converters in 1975 to help meet increasingly stringent federal (and California) emission requirements.

In mid-1971, a Turbo-Hydramatic transmission, power steering and power front-disc brakes became standard equipment on Bonneville and other full-sized Pontiacs (as well as other full-sized GM cars).

From 1973 to 1976, the Bonneville's standard engine dropped to a 170-horsepower 400 cubic-inch V8. Optionally available was the 455 four-barrel V8 rated at 250 horsepower (186 kW) in 1973 and 1974 and 200 in 1975 and 1976. In 1973, Bonneville was the only full-sized Pontiac to offer a "Radial Tuned Suspension" option package which included the steel-belted radial tires along with an upgraded suspension with Pliacell shock absorbers and front and rear sway bars. The RTS option was expanded for 1974 to all full-sized Pontiacs and radial-ply tires became standard on all 1975 models though an upgraded "RTS" package was still available as an option.

1975 saw the end of the pillarless two-door hardtop model, replaced by a coupe with frameless door glass but with a thick "B" pillar and fixed rear "opera" window. The 1975 model year introduced rectangular headlights - its frontal appearance was similar to the Cadillac DeVilles and Fleetwoods of the same era.

With the demise of the Grand Ville series after 1975, Bonneville once again became the top-line full-sized Pontiac series, with a Bonneville Brougham model featuring the luxurious interior appointments from the departed Grand Ville.

Adjustable pedals were optional in 1976, the last year the Bonneville was offered as a pillarless 4-door hardtop; all subsequent Bonnevilles would have a thick B-pillar and metal-framed door glass.

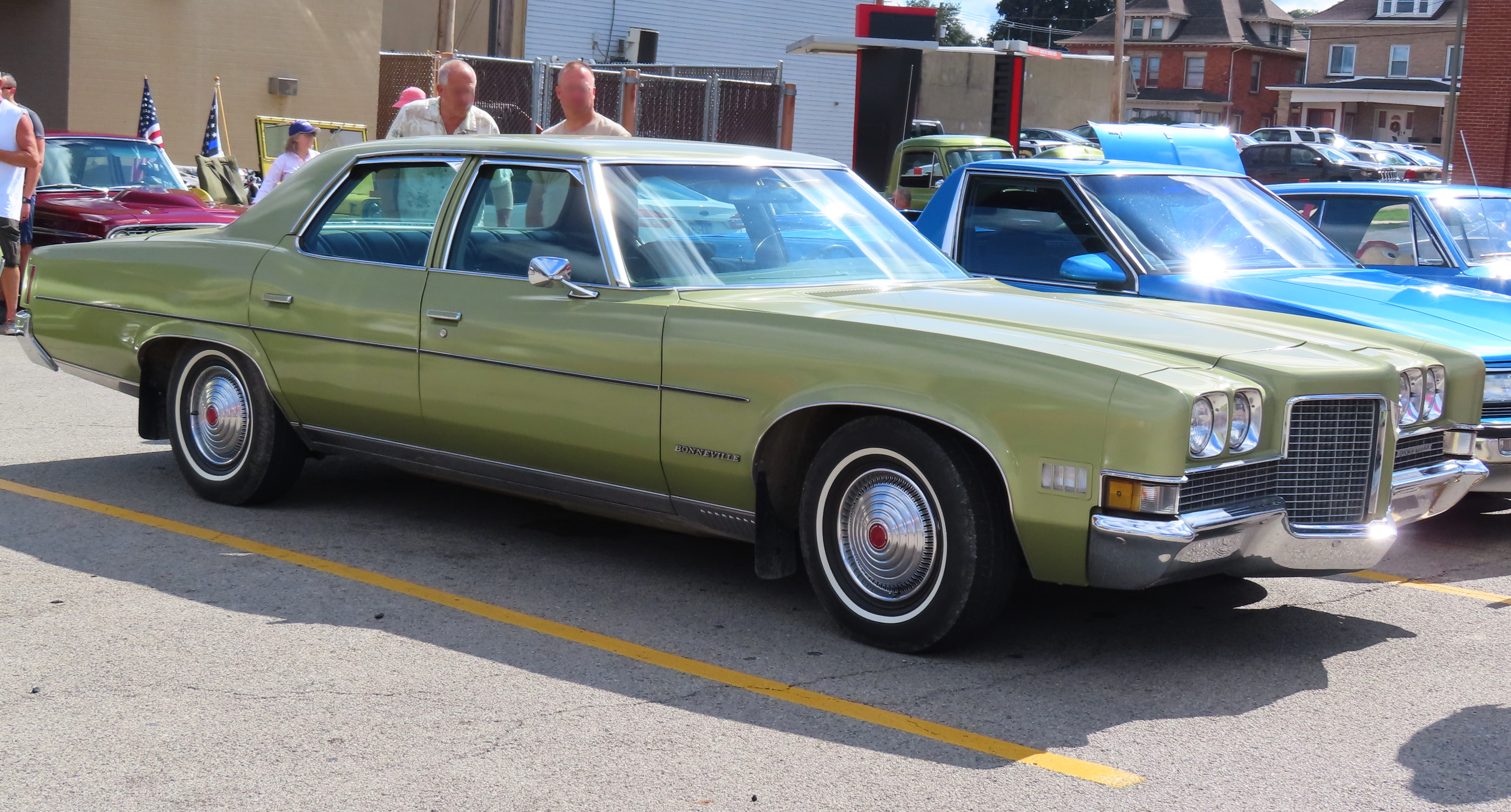
1971 Pontiac Bonneville 4-Door Sedan

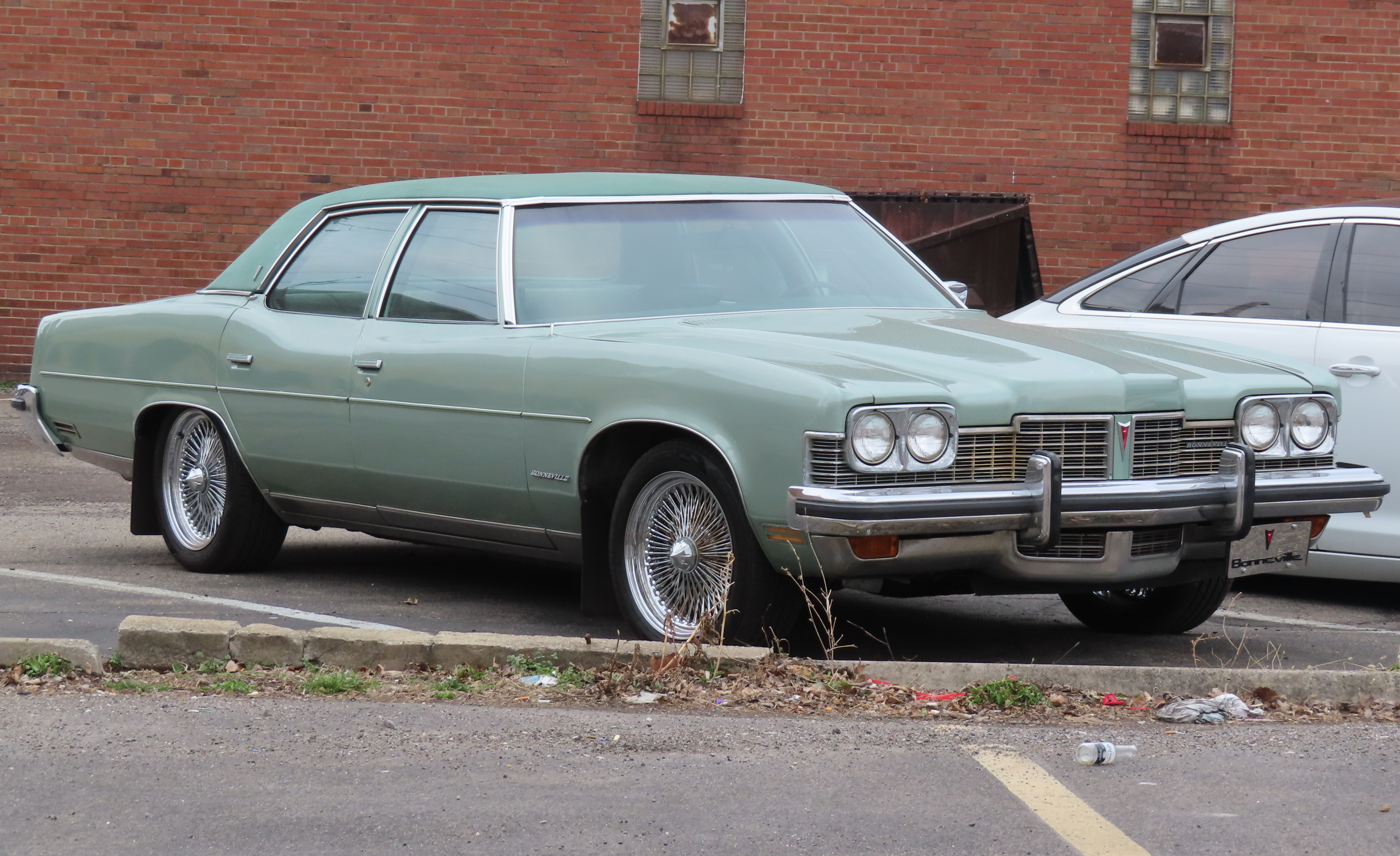
1973 Pontiac Bonneville 4-Door Sedan (with non-standard wheels)

Size comparison between 1974 and 1984 full-size Pontiac sedans

	1974 Pontiac Bonneville	1984 Pontiac Parisienne
Wheelbase	124 in (3,150 mm)	116.0 in (2,946 mm)
Overall length	226.0 in (5,740 mm)	212.0 in (5,385 mm)
Width	79.6 in (2,022 mm)	75.2 in (1,910 mm)
Height	54.2 in (1,377 mm)	56.4 in (1,433 mm)
Front headroom	38.9 in (988 mm)	39.5 in (1,003 mm)
Front legroom	42.3 in (1,074 mm)	42.2 in (1,072 mm)
Front hip room	62.0 in (1,575 mm)	55.0 in (1,397 mm)
Front shoulder room	64.3 in (1,633 mm)	60.6 in (1,539 mm)
Rear headroom	38.0 in (965 mm)	38.2 in (970 mm)
Rear legroom	38.8 in (986 mm)	38.9 in (988 mm)
Rear hip room	61.9 in (1,572 mm)	55.7 in (1,415 mm)
Rear shoulder room	63.5 in (1,613 mm)	60.5 in (1,537 mm)
Luggage capacity	19.5 cu ft (552 L)	20.8 cu ft (589 L)

== Sixth generation (1977–1981) ==
Sixth generation
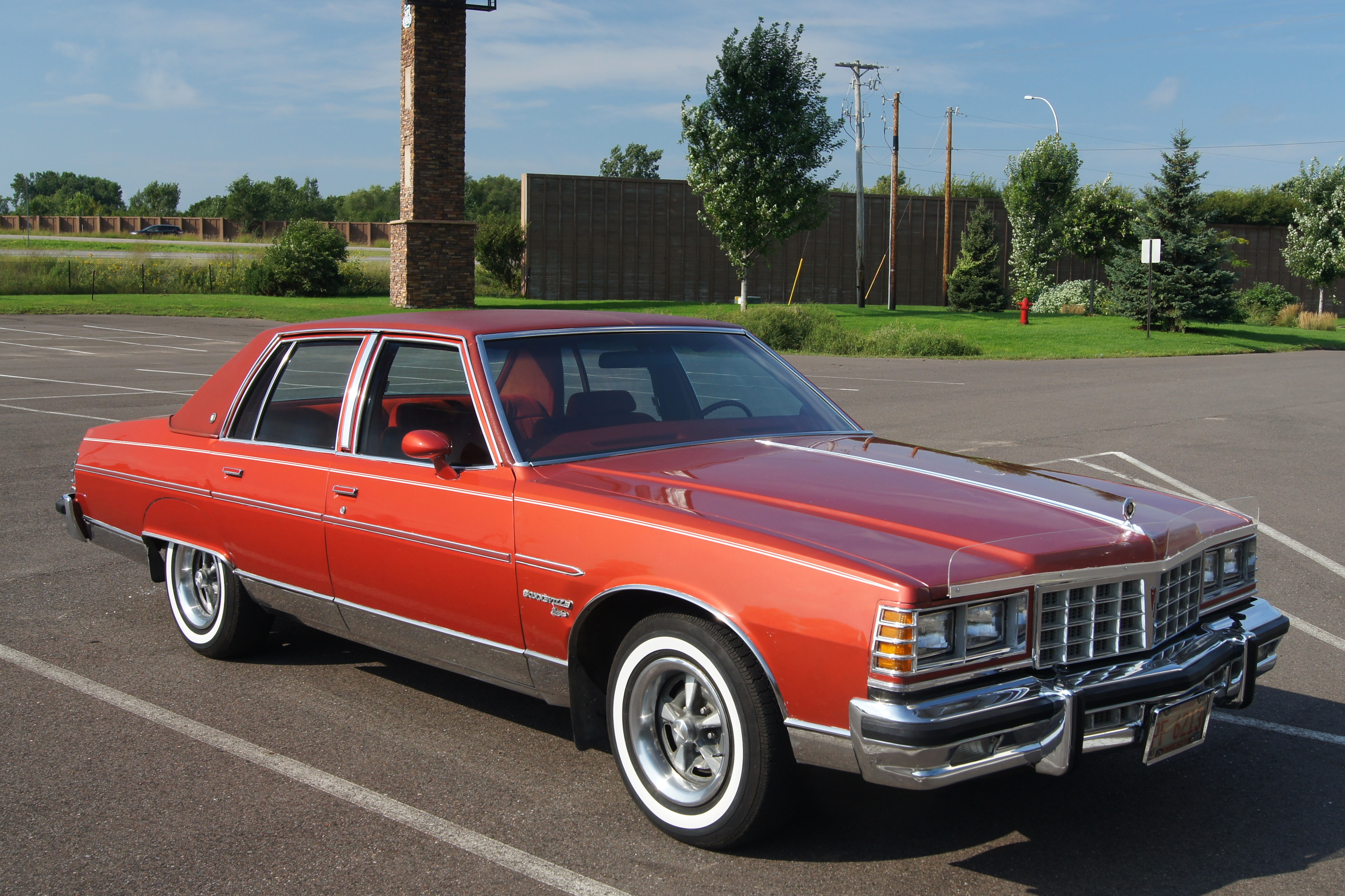

Overview
- Model years: 1977–1981
- Assembly: Pontiac Assembly in Pontiac, Michigan, United States; Fairfax Assembly in Kansas City, Kansas, U.S. Oshawa Car Assembly in Oshawa, Ontario, Canada
- Designer: Irv Rybicki

Body and chassis
- Body style: 2-door coupe 4-door sedan 4-door station wagon
- Layout: FR layout
- Platform: B-body
- Related: Buick LeSabre; Oldsmobile 88; Pontiac Catalina/Laurentian; Chevrolet Impala

Powertrain
- Engine: 231 cu in (3.8 L) Buick V6; 265 cu in (4.3 L) Pontiac V8; 301 cu in (4.9 L) Pontiac V8; 350 cu in (5.7 L) Pontiac V8; 350 cu in (5.7 L) Buick V8; 350 cu in (5.7 L) Chevrolet V8; 305 cu in (5.0 L) Chevrolet V8; 350 cu in (5.7 L) Oldsmobile diesel V8; 400 cu in (6.6 L) Pontiac V8; 403 cu in (6.6 L) Oldsmobile V8

Dimensions
- Wheelbase: 116.0 in (2,946 mm) (1979)
- Length: 214.3 in (5,443 mm) (1979)
- Width: 76.4 in (1,941 mm) (1979)

Chronology
- Successor: Pontiac Parisienne (1982-1986, U.S. only)

The Bonneville was significantly downsized for 1977. Bonnevilles (and Catalinas) were 14 inches (360 mm) shorter in length, over four inches (102 mm) narrower and 800 pounds lighter compared to their 1976 counterparts, while offering increased headroom, rear seat legroom and trunk space, and much-improved fuel economy – a major selling point in the years following the 1973-74 energy crisis.

Only a pillared four-door sedan and two-door coupe (with optional opera windows) were offered, as the hardtop sedans and hardtop coupes offered in previous years were discontinued for all GM divisions.

The Bonneville regained the Safari station wagon as part of its model lineup for the first time since 1970, with faux woodgrain exterior trim and interior appointments shared with Bonneville coupes and sedans. The Safari was available in both 6 and 9-passenger configurations and featured a dual action side- or bottom-hinged tailgate, rather than the disappearing clamshell tailgates of 1971-76 full-sized Pontiac wagons.

For 1977 and 1978, the standard engine in Bonneville was Pontiac's new 301 cubic-inch V8 rated at 135 horsepower (101 kW), while optional engines included a 170-horsepower 350 or 180-horsepower 400 cubic-inch V8. A 185-horsepower Oldsmobile 403 cubic inch V8 was also an option. In later years, increasingly stringent fuel-economy standards mandated by the Corporate Average Fuel Economy (CAFE) regulations would lead to the discontinuation of the larger engines, with a 231 cubic-inch Buick V6 becoming the standard engine on Bonneville coupes and sedans for 1980 and 1981, with the only optional V8s offered including 265 and 301 cubic-inch Pontiac-built gasoline engines or an Oldsmobile-built 350 cid diesel powerplant.

For 1980, all GM B-bodies received revised styling and aerodynamic improvements along with reduced weight.

The Bonneville and Catalina, already the smallest-selling of GM's B-body line, suffered a serious drop in demand following the economic recession that began in the spring of 1979. With that, GM discontinued the 6th generation with the 1981 model year, along with the 265 and 301 engines.

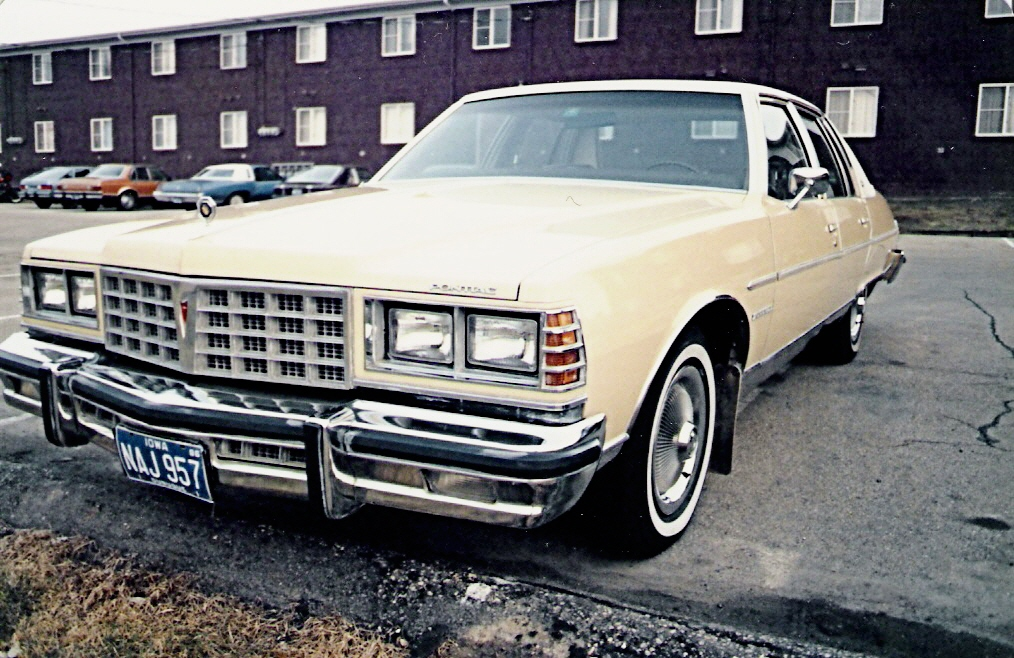
1977 Pontiac Bonneville 4-Door Sedan

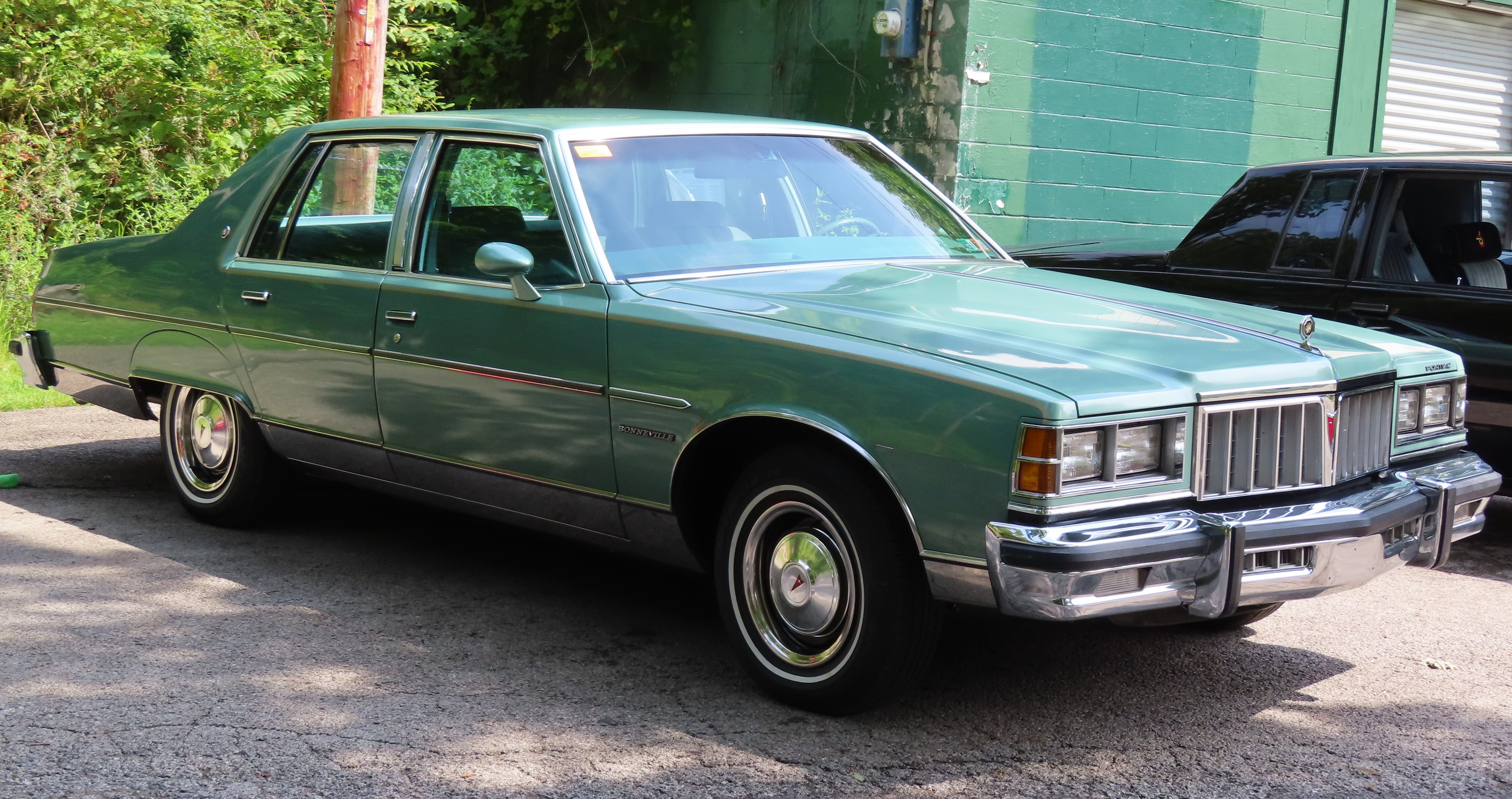
1978 Pontiac Bonneville Sedan

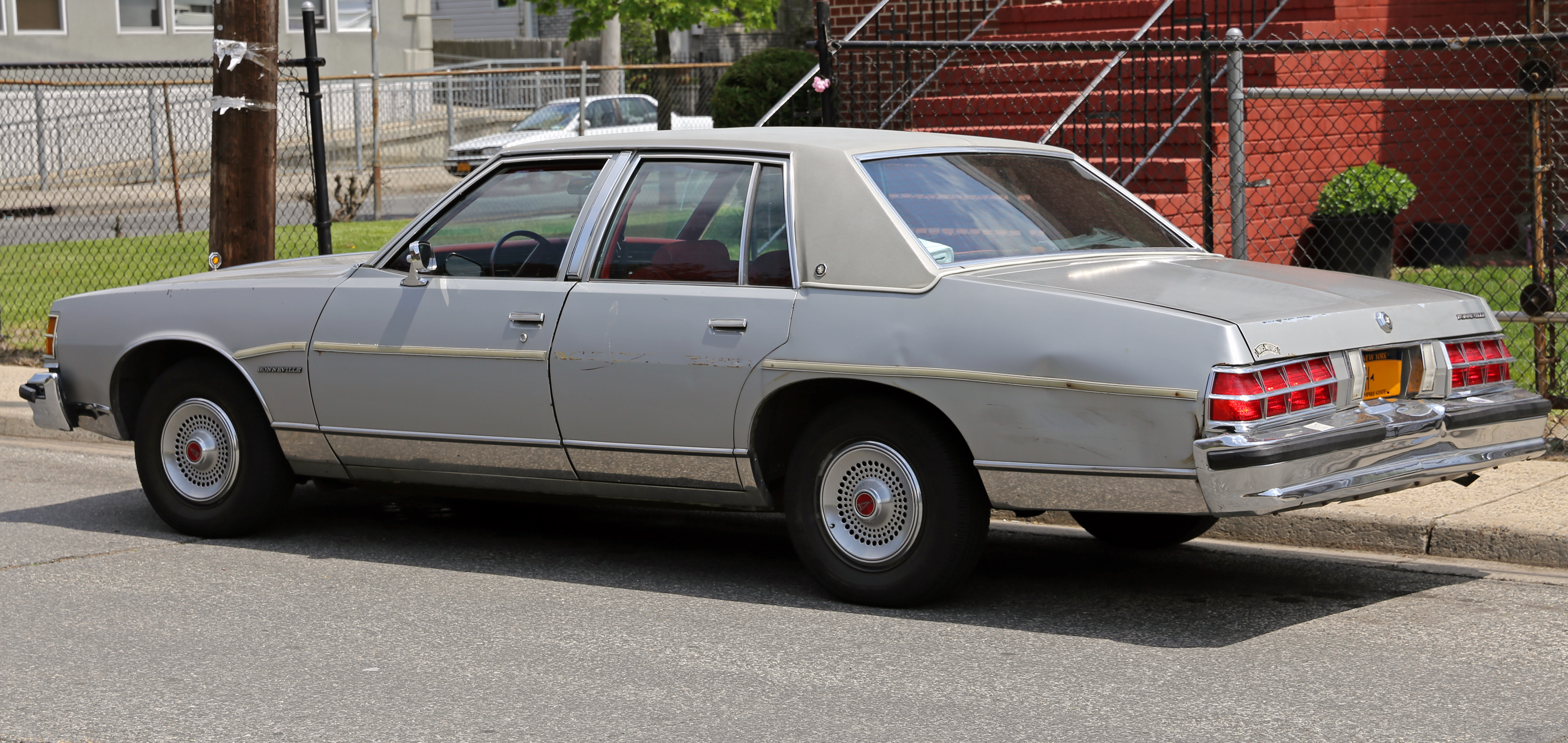
Rear view of a 1978 Bonneville sedan

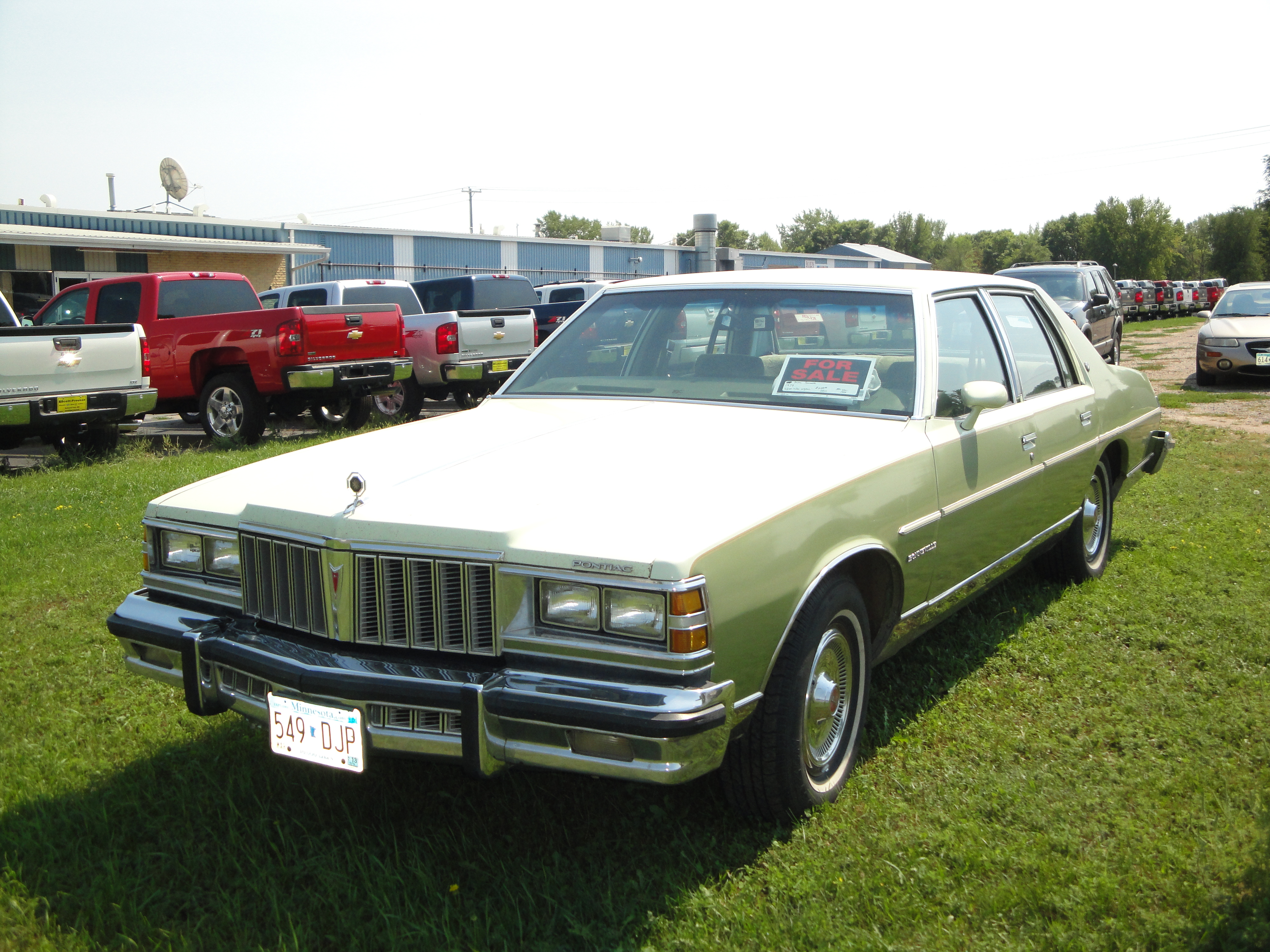
1979 Pontiac Bonneville Sedan

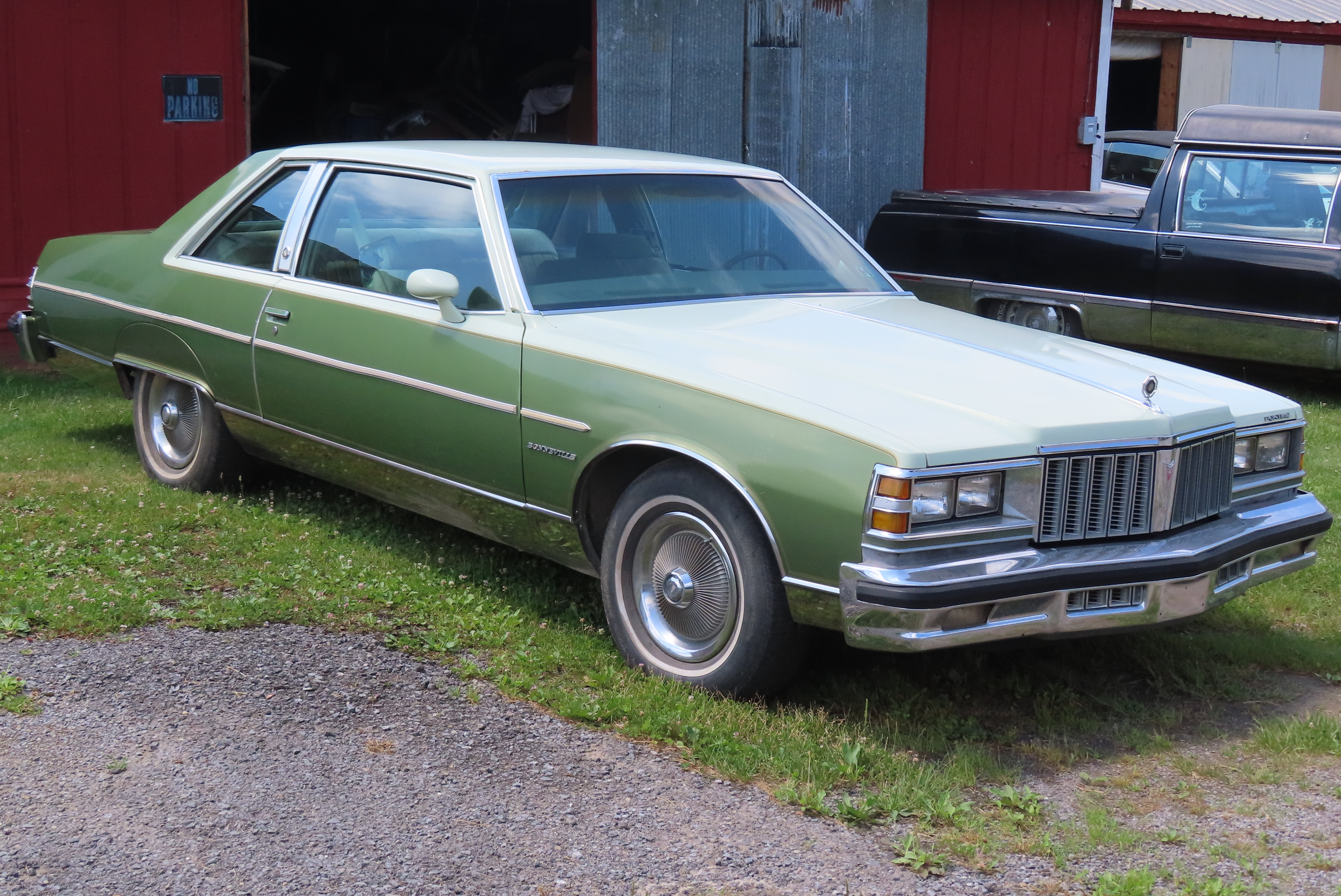
1979 Pontiac Bonneville Coupe

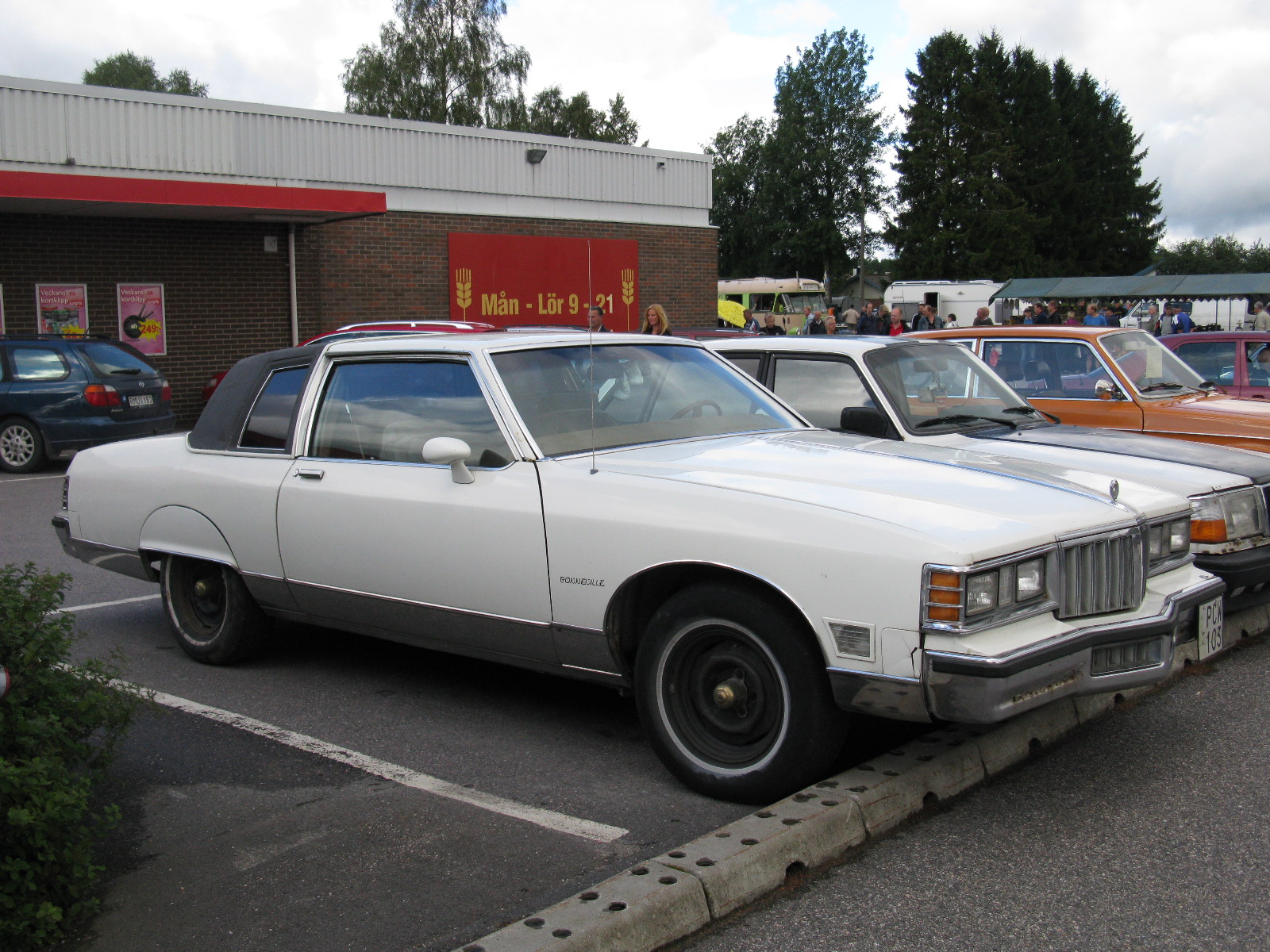
1980 Pontiac Bonneville 2-door coupe

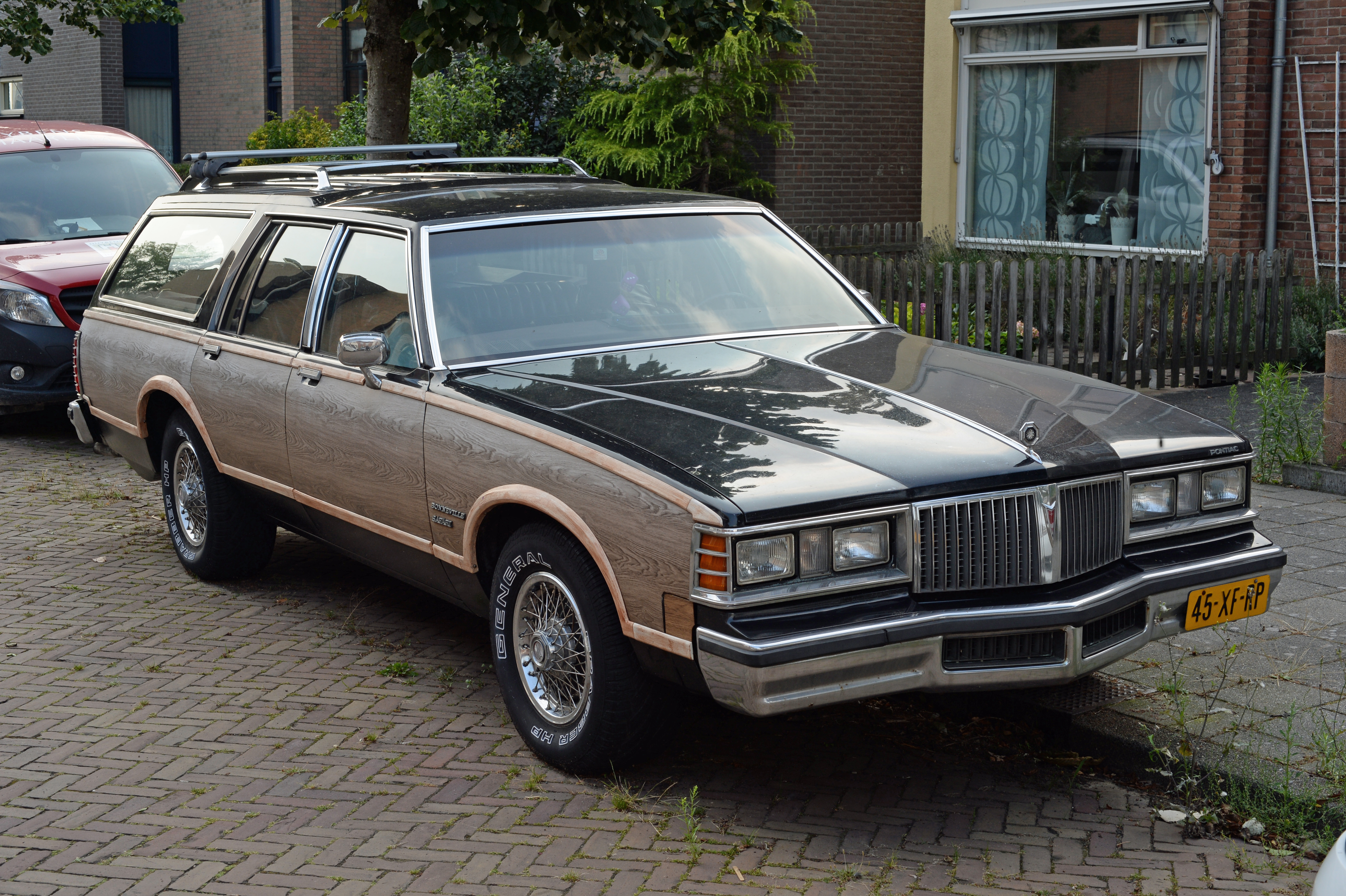
1981 Pontiac Bonneville Safari

== Seventh generation (1982–1986) ==
Seventh generation
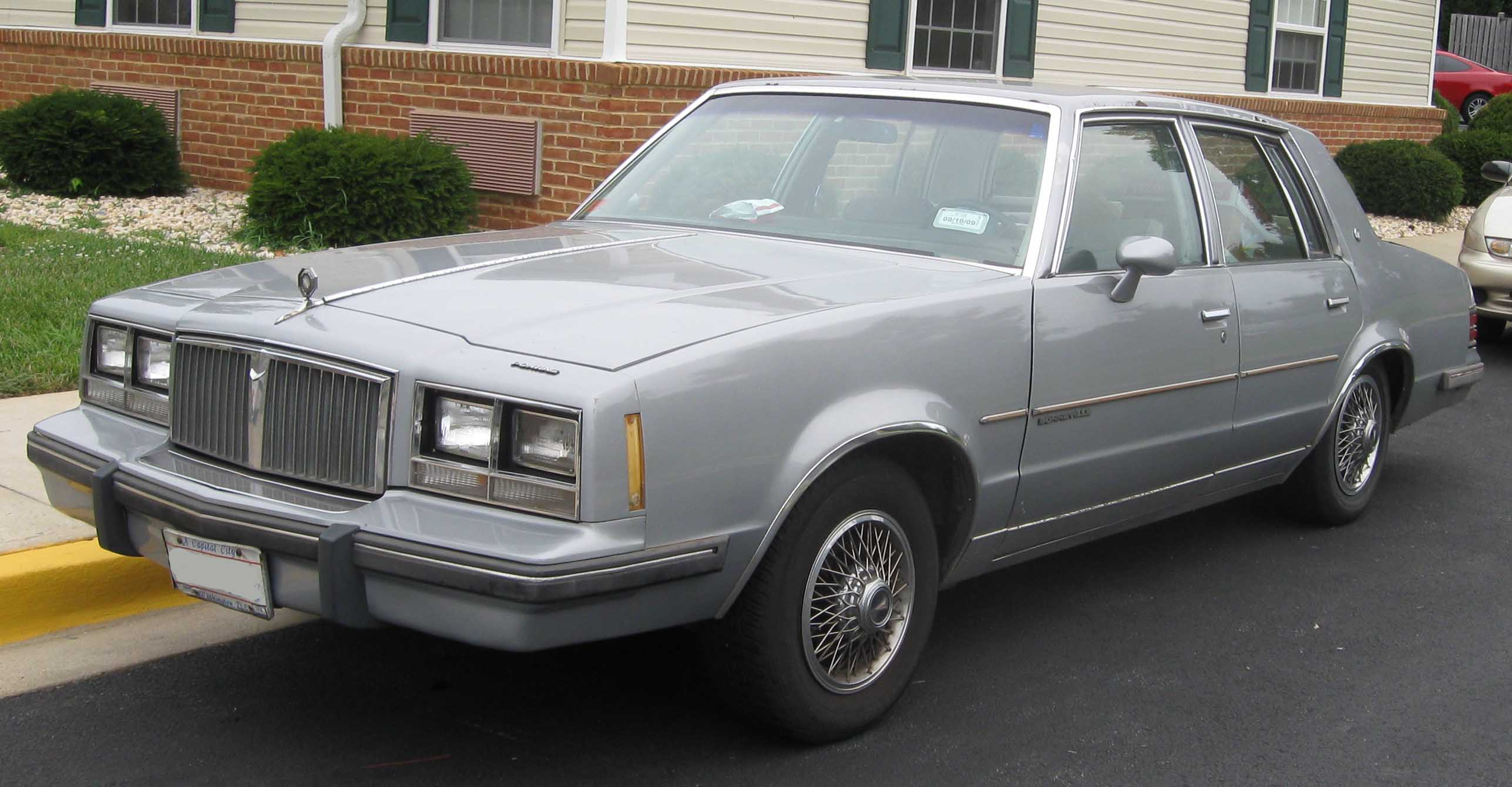

Overview
- Also called: Pontiac Grand LeMans (Canada)
- Model years: 1982–1986
- Assembly: Pontiac Assembly; Baltimore Assembly; Sainte-Thérèse Assembly

Body and chassis
- Body style: 4-door sedan; 5-door station wagon
- Layout: FR layout
- Platform: G-platform/G-body
- Related: Buick Regal; Oldsmobile Cutlass Supreme

Powertrain
- Engine: 3.8 L (231 cu in) Buick V6; 5.0 L (305 cu in) Chevrolet V8; 5.7 L (350 cu in) Oldsmobile Diesel; 4.4 L (267 cu in) Chevrolet V8
- Transmission: 3-speed THM200 automatic 4-speed 200-4R automatic

Dimensions
- Wheelbase: 108.1 in (2,746 mm)
- Length: 198.6 in (5,044 mm)
- Width: 71.3 in (1,811 mm)

Chronology
- Predecessor: Pontiac LeMans

Following the discontinuation of full-sized Pontiacs, the Bonneville name was instead simply swapped onto the midsized LeMans, which also suffered from poor sales. Thus, GM planners reasoned that attaching a more well-known model name to it would spark demand. This model had been produced since 1978 along with its siblings the Chevrolet Malibu, Oldsmobile Cutlass, and Buick Century, and sported a Buick 231 cid V6, Chevrolet 305 cid V8, or Oldsmobile 350 cid diesel V8. (A Buick 4.1 liter V6 was available in 1982.) The 1982-1986 models were officially known as the Pontiac Bonneville Model G (built on the GM "G" platform), although later models were not badged as such. Styling was revised to bear a closer resemblance to the departed B-body Bonneville and coupes were dropped. GM also began marketing the Bonneville in Canada for the first time starting in 1984 (1982 and 1983 Canadian models carried the Grand LeMans name), as GM's full-size Bonnevilles in Canada were referred to as Parisienne.

While the previous LeMans, on which the new Bonneville was based, was classified as an A-Body, introduction of GM's new front wheel drive A-bodies (e.g. Pontiac 6000) in 1982 prompted the change to "Model G" on these RWD cars. 1983 was the last year for the G-body station wagon as the Pontiac 6000's wagon replaced it. The Bonneville sedan continued in base, Limited Edition (LE), and Brougham versions through 1986. The 1982-1986 Bonnevilles are direct descendants of the 1964 Pontiac Tempest. These 1982-1986 Bonnevilles were the smallest and the last of the old breed of Bonnevilles, having rear wheel drive, full perimeter frame (body on frame), and old-fashioned American car ride and styling.

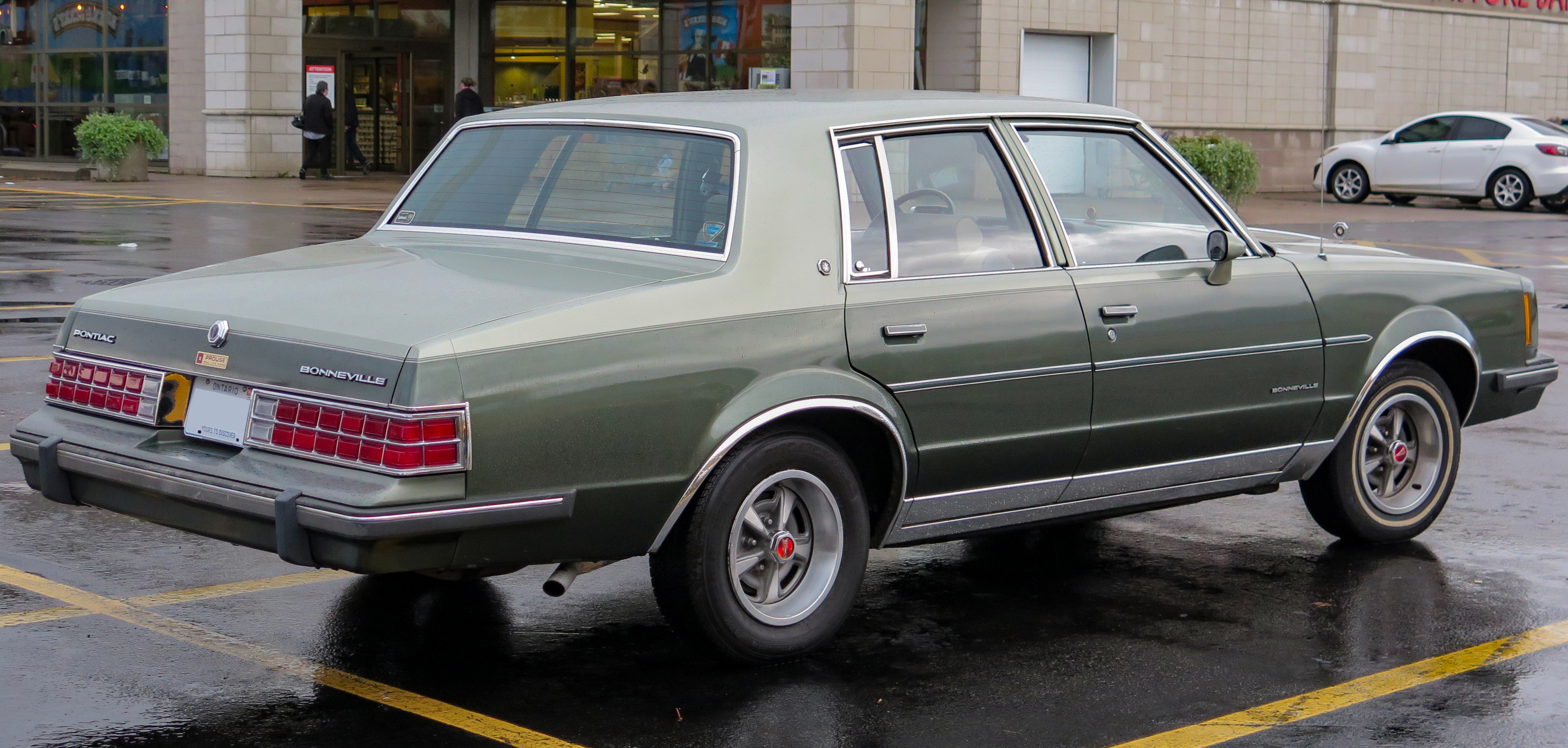
Rear view of a 1985 Bonneville

However, some Pontiac customers did not take to the "downsized" Bonneville as a portion of new-car buyers were switching their preferences from compact and mid-sized cars back to full-sized, V8-powered cars thanks to improving gasoline prices. Late in the 1983 model year, Pontiac reintroduced a full-sized car to the American market by bringing over the Canadian-built Pontiac Parisienne (which was essentially a restyled Chevrolet Caprice and powered by Chevrolet V6 or V8 engines). The Bonneville was then again one notch below the top of the line from late 1983 through 1986.

However, exactly as before, a downsizing proved its salvation. In 1987, the Parisienne was discontinued and the Bonneville was completely redesigned as a front-wheel drive car, rejoining its pre-1982 platform mates: the Buick LeSabre and Oldsmobile Delta 88 and it regained its status as the senior Pontiac.

== Eighth generation (1987–1991) ==
Eighth generation
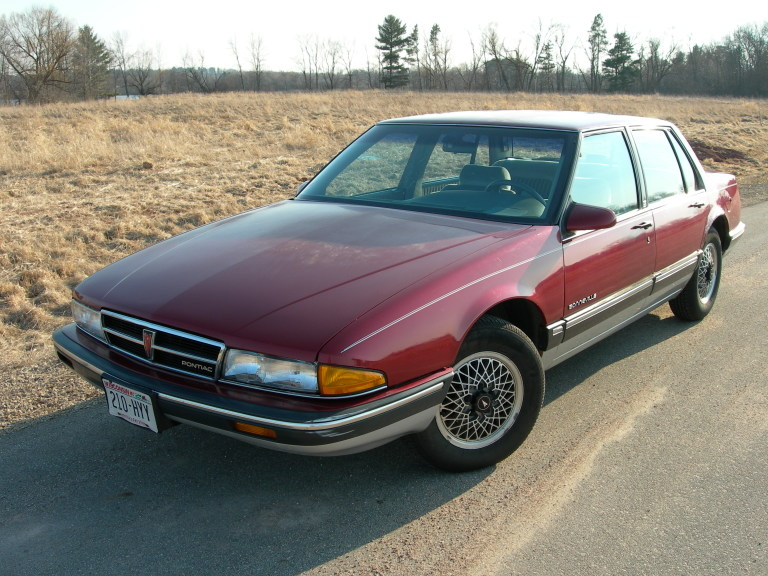

Overview
- Model years: 1987–1991
- Assembly: Ypsilanti, Michigan, U.S. (Willow Run Assembly) 1987–1989 (early); Wentzville, Missouri, U.S. (Wentzville Assembly) 1989 (late)–1991
- Designer: Irv Rybicki (1983)

Body and chassis
- Body style: 4-door sedan
- Layout: Transverse front-engine, front-wheel drive
- Platform: H-body
- Related: Buick LeSabre; Oldsmobile 88

Powertrain
- Engine: 3.8 L LG3 Buick V6 Specifications: Years Used: 1987–1988; •Family: GM Buick 90° V6; •RPO/VIN: LG3/3; •Displacement: 3,791 cc (231 cu in); •Stroke: 3.40 in (86 mm); •Bore: 3.80 in (97 mm); •Power: 150 hp (112 kW) at 4400 rpm; •Torque: 210 lb⋅ft (285 N⋅m) at 2200 rpm; •Fuel Type: Gasoline; •Fuel System:SFI; •Configuration: 12V/OHV; •Compression: 8.5:1; •Aspiration: Normal; 3.8 L LN3 3800 Buick V6 Specifications: Years Used: 1988–1991; •Family: GM Buick 90° V6; •Model: 3800; •RPO/VIN: LN3/C; •Displacement: 3,791 cc (231 cu in); •Stroke: 3.40 in (86 mm); •Bore: 3.80 in (97 mm); •Power: 165 hp (123 kW) at 4400 rpm; •Torque: 220 lb⋅ft (298 N⋅m) at 2800 rpm; •Fuel Type: Gasoline; •Fuel System:MPFI; •Configuration: 12V/OHV; •Compression: 8.5:1; •Aspiration: Normal
- Transmission: 4-speed THM440T4 automatic

Dimensions
- Wheelbase: 110.8 in (2,814 mm)
- Length: 198.7 in (5,047 mm); 1987–89 SE: 198.3 in (5,037 mm); 1990–91 SSE: 198.6 in (5,044 mm)
- Width: 1987–89: 72.4 in (1,839 mm); 1990–91: 72.1 in (1,831 mm)
- Height: 1987–89 LE & SE: 55.5 in (1,410 mm); 1987–89 SSE: 54.7 in (1,389 mm); 1990–91 LE & SE: 54.1 in (1,374 mm); 1990–91 SSE: 54.6 in (1,387 mm)
- Curb weight: LE 3,325 lb (1,508 kg); SE 3,413 lb (1,548 kg); SSE 3,601 lb (1,633 kg)

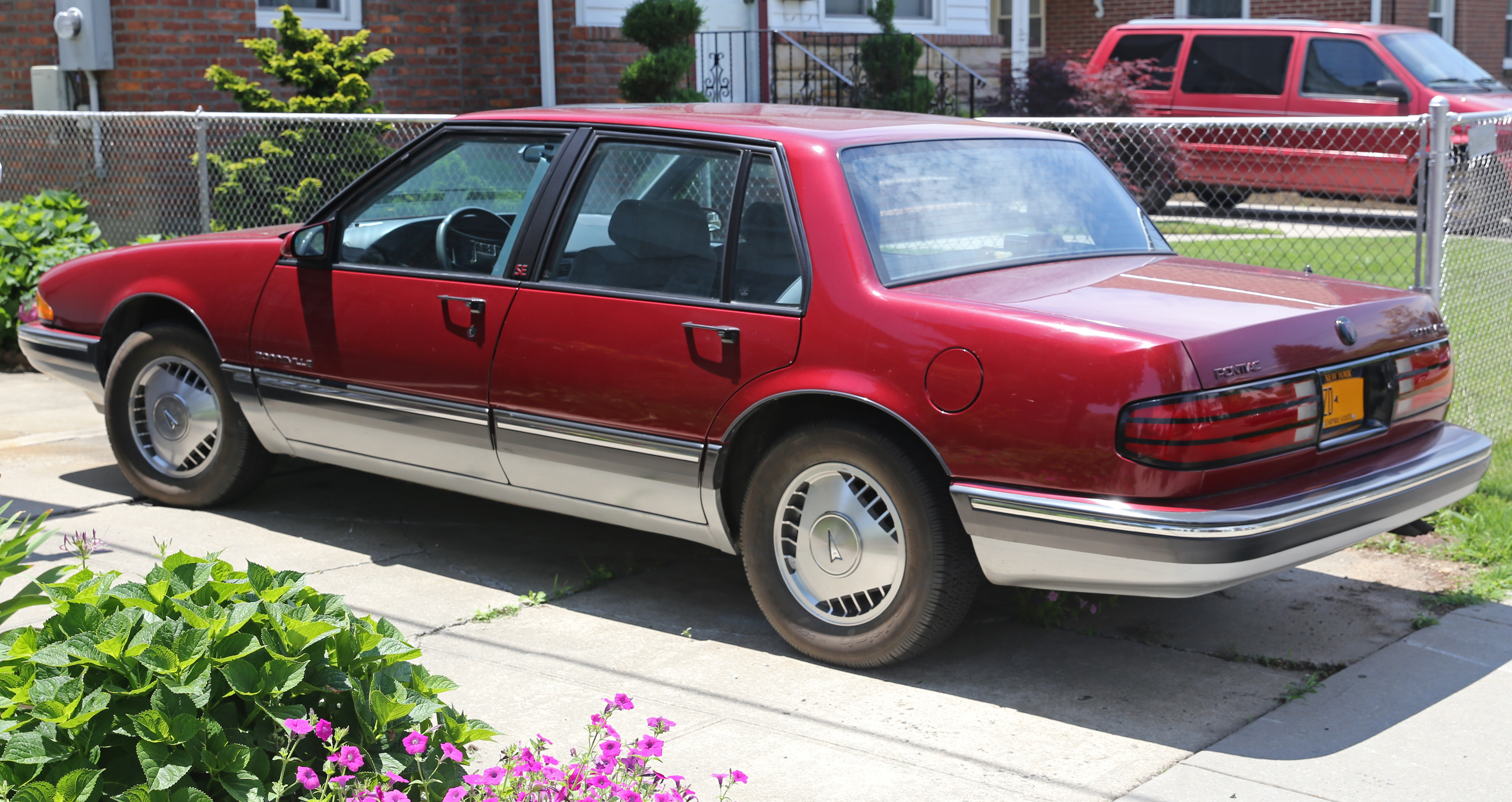
Rear view of a 1987 Pontiac Bonneville SE

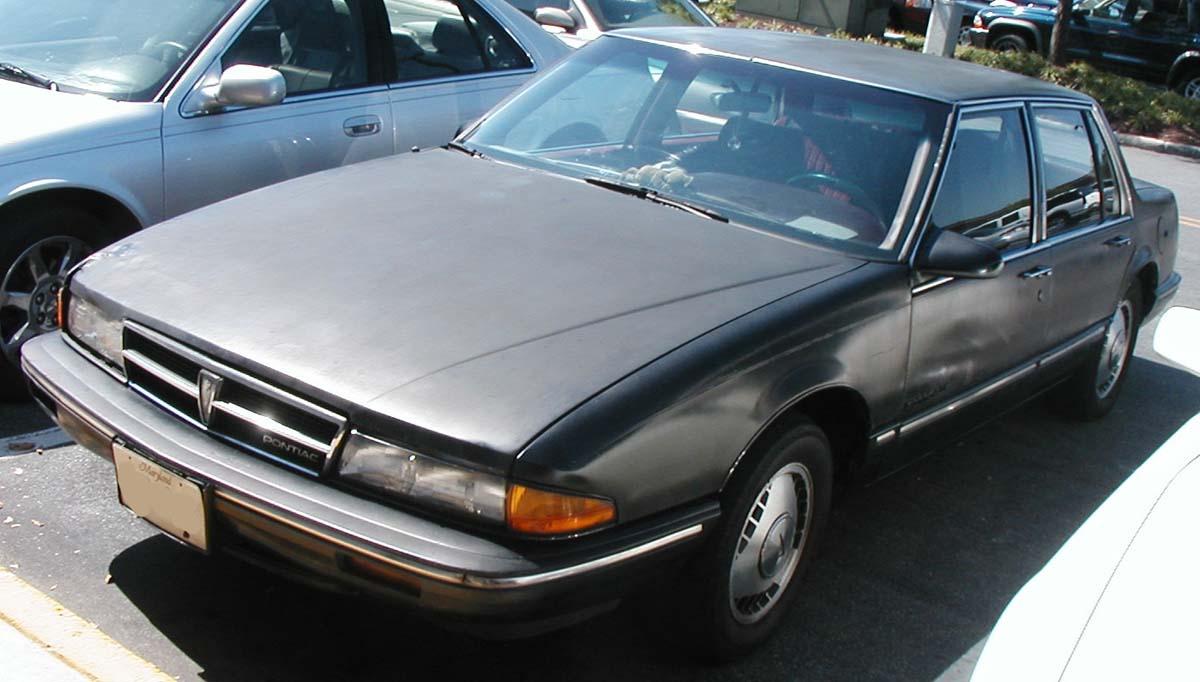
1988 Pontiac Bonneville

For 1987, Pontiac migrated the Bonneville from the rear-drive G-body with a V8 to the GM's one year old front-drive H Body platform, shared with the Buick LeSabre and Oldsmobile 88. Initially, a 150 hp (112 kW) 3.8 L V6 was the sole engine, mated to a four-speed Hydramatic 4T60 automatic — in base and LE trim levels. The base model was only used for 1987. For LE models, an SSE sport package was also available featuring a quicker gear ratio, sportier suspension and more standard features, marketed as having a more sporty, European character than the LeSabre and 88.

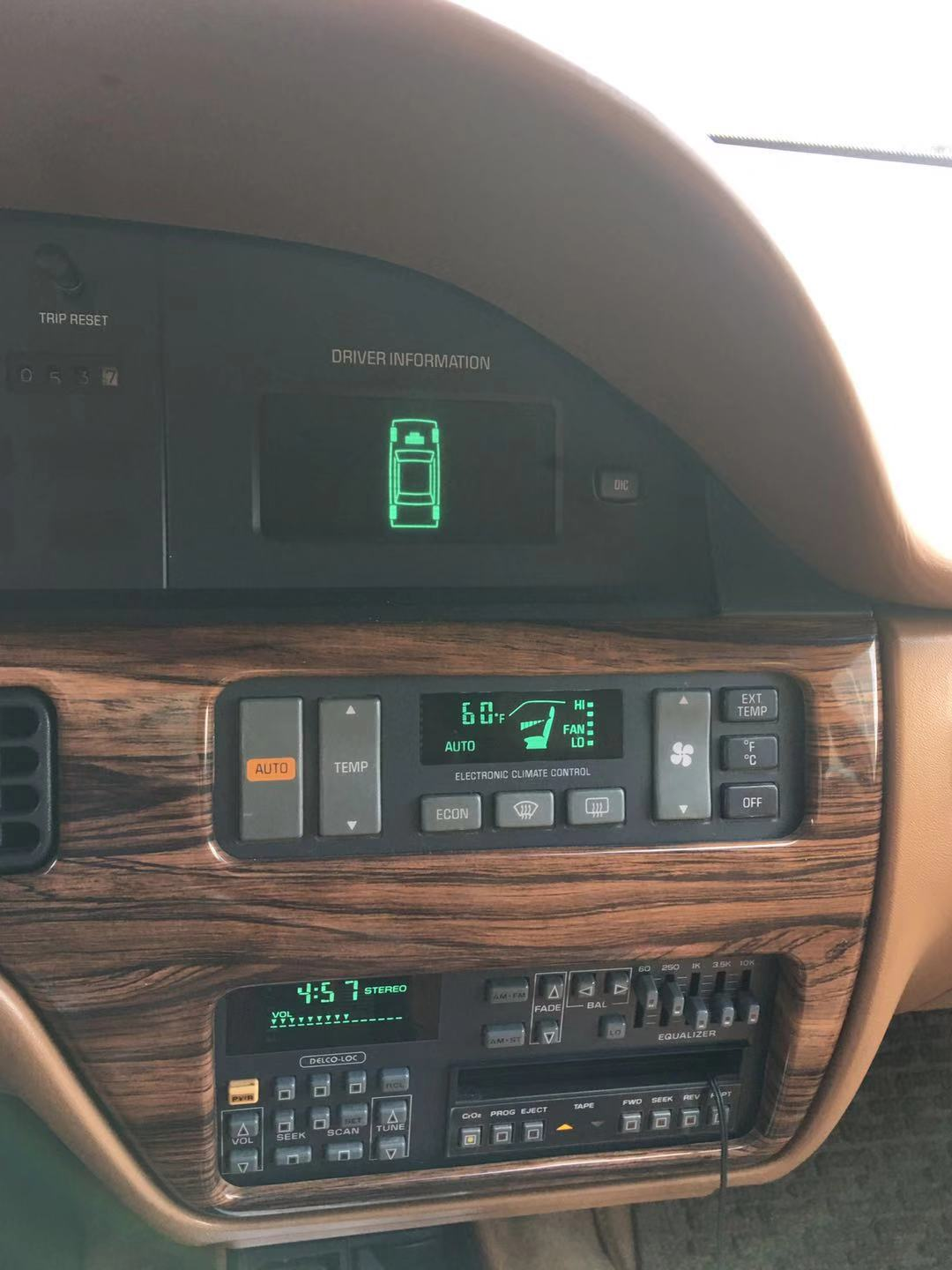
The interior of a Bonneville SSE. It features the Driver Information Center, automatic climate control and the Delco UT4 stereo.

For 1988, Pontiac replaced the LG3 engine with a revised version of the same engine, with an increase of 10 hp and 10 ft⋅lbf (14 N⋅m) of torque — the 3.8 engine now used a regular production code (RPO) LN3 and was now called the 3800 V6. Featuring sequential-port fuel injection, the engine produced 165 hp (123 kW) and 210 lb⋅ft (285 N⋅m). Other models on the H-body platform were fitted with the LN3 engine one year later, in 1989. The LN3 was used through 1991, since the Bonneville was redesigned for the 1992 model year.

Also in 1988, the LE model, which was previously the top trim level for 1987, becomes the base trim. The base model, which was used for 1987, was dropped. Additionally, two new models are introduced: the midlevel SE, which went from an option package to a trim level, and the SSE trim. The SE and SSE trims were then available with many more comfort and convenience options standard such as: electronic climate control, a digital compass, Driver Information Center, 8-way (14-way for the SSE according to GM material) power leather seats, heated power mirrors, CD player with the premium sound package and many more.

The SSE features an extra deep rear valence, a spoiler, lower body cladding, a digital compass/trip computer, an eight speaker premium sound system and much more. One notable feature of the SSE was the addition of an automatic leveling rear air suspension, which also included an inflator in the trunk. The SSE trim was exclusively equipped with an exterior sport appearance package that included body cladding, assorted ground effects, a body color grille and removal of the Bonneville door badges and Pontiac trunk badge, and replacing the Bonneville trunk badge with an SSE Bonneville badge.

For 1989, a CD player and remote keyless entry became optional. For 1990 models, a facelift was introduced for the Bonneville, with revisions to the grille, headlights, and taillights, which included amber rear turn signal indicators. For the 1991 model year, Pontiac made suspension revisions. 1991 was also the last year for the first front-wheel-drive generation of the Bonneville.

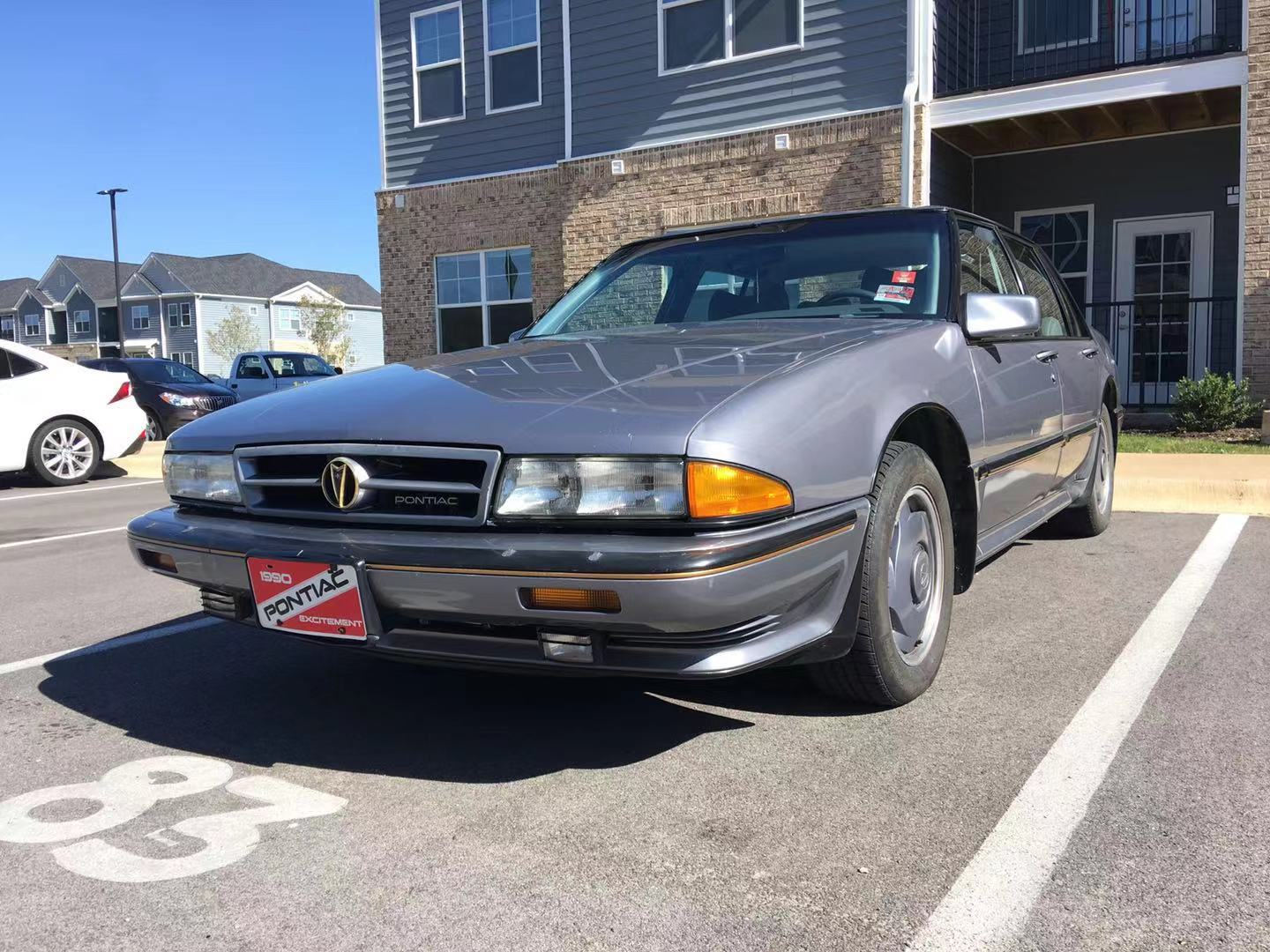
A grey 1990 Pontiac Bonneville SSE.

Production by trim level
Year	LE	SE	SSE
1987	53,912	69,904	—
1988	72,859	20,872	14,832
1989	66,636	15,944	13,056
1990	55,926	16,854	13,064
1991	34,405	2,734	5,665

== Ninth generation (1992–1999) ==
Ninth generation
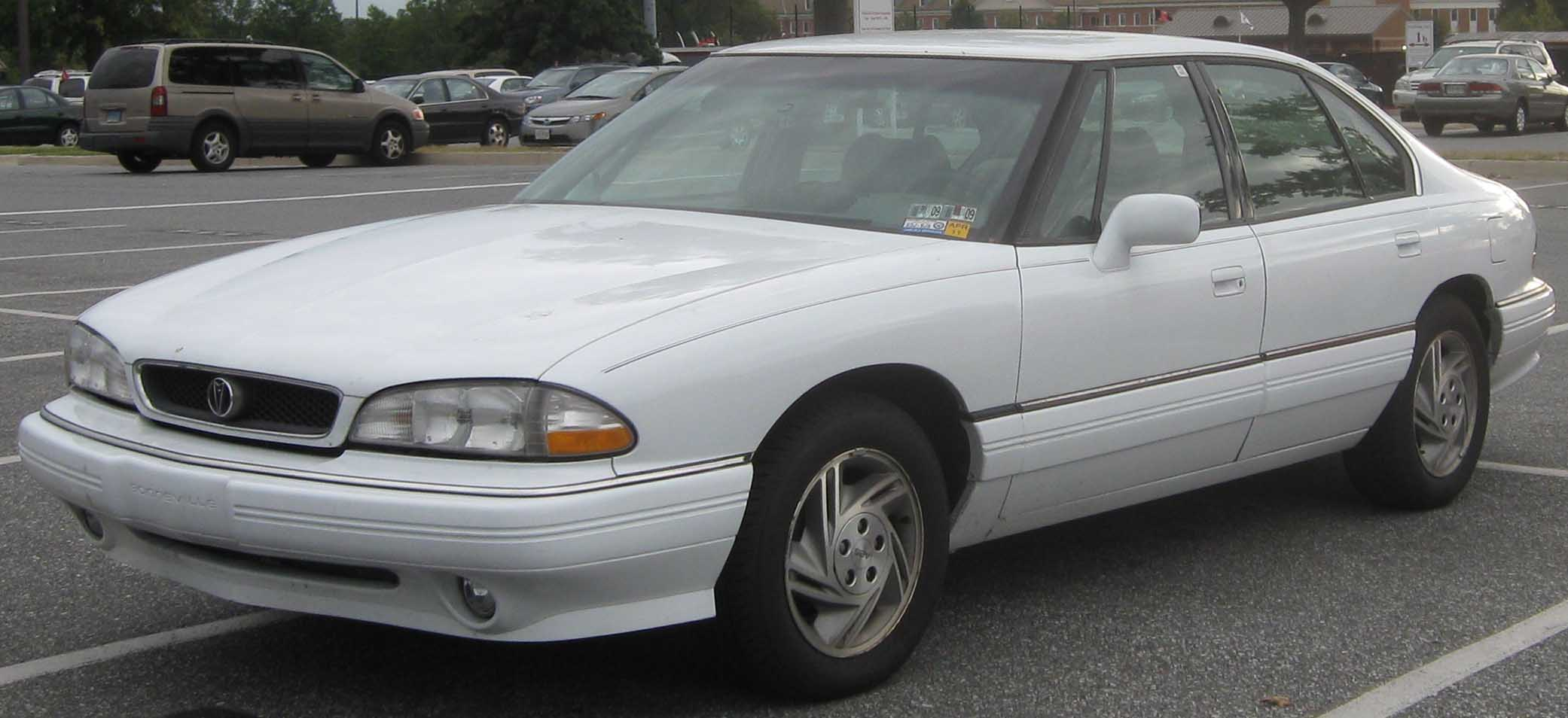

Overview
- Model years: 1992–1999
- Assembly: Wentzville Assembly, Wentzville, Missouri, U.S. May 1991–1993 (1992–1993 model years); Lake Orion, Michigan, U.S. 1993–1998 (1994–1998 model years); Flint, Michigan, U.S. July 1995–June 29, 1999 (1996–1999 model years)
- Designer: John Folden (1988); Wayne Cherry (facelift: 1993)

Body and chassis
- Body style: 4-door sedan
- Layout: Transverse front-engine, front-wheel drive
- Platform: H-body
- Related: Buick LeSabre; Oldsmobile 88; Oldsmobile LSS

Powertrain
- Engine: 3.8 L Series I L27 V6 Specifications: Years used: 1992–1994; •Family: GM Buick 90° V6; •Model: Series I 3800; •RPO/VIN: L27/L; •Displacement: 3,791 cc (231 cu in); •Stroke: 3.40 in (86 mm); •Bore: 3.80 in (97 mm); •Power: 170 hp (127 kW) @ 4800 rpm; •Torque: 225 lb⋅ft (305 N⋅m) @ 3200 rpm; •Fuel type: gasoline; •Fuel system:SEFI; •Configuration: 12V/OHV; •Compression: 9.0:1; •Aspiration: normal; 3.8 L Series I L67 V6 Specifications: Years used: 1992–1993; •Family: GM Buick 90° V6; •Model: Series I supercharged 3800; •RPO/VIN: L67/1; •Displacement: 3,791 cc (231 cu in); •Stroke: 3.40 in (86 mm); •Bore: 3.80 in (97 mm); •Power: 205 hp (153 kW) @ 4400 rpm; •Torque: 260 lb⋅ft (353 N⋅m) @ 2600 rpm; •Fuel type: gasoline; •Fuel system:SEFI; •Configuration: 12V/OHV; •Compression: 8.0:1; •Aspiration: supercharged; 3.8 L Series I L67 V6 Specifications: Years used: 1994–1995; •Family: GM Buick 90° V6; •Model: Series I supercharged 3800; •RPO/VIN: L67/1; •Displacement: 3,791 cc (231 cu in); •Stroke: 3.40 in (86 mm); •Bore: 3.80 in (97 mm); •Power: 225 hp (168 kW) @ 5000 rpm; •Torque: 275 lb⋅ft (373 N⋅m) @ 3200 rpm; •Fuel type: gasoline; •Fuel system:SEFI; •Configuration: 12V/OHV; •Compression: 8.0:1; •Aspiration: supercharged; 3.8 L Series II L36 V6 Specifications: Years used: 1995–1999; •Family: GM Buick 90° V6; •Model: Series II 3800; •RPO/VIN: L36/K; •Displacement: 3,791 cc (231 cu in); •Stroke: 3.40 in (86 mm); •Bore: 3.80 in (97 mm); •Power: 205 hp (153 kW) @ 5200 rpm; •Torque: 230 lb⋅ft (312 N⋅m) @ 4000 rpm; •Fuel type: gasoline; •Fuel system:SEFI; •Configuration: 12V/OHV; •Compression: 9.4:1; •Aspiration: normal; 3.8 L Series II L67 V6 Specifications: Years used: 1996–1999; •Family: GM Buick 90° V6; •Model: Series II supercharged 3800; •RPO/VIN: L67/1; •Displacement: 3,791 cc (231 cu in); •Stroke: 3.40 in (86 mm); •Bore: 3.80 in (97 mm); •Power: 240 hp (179 kW) @ 5200 rpm; •Torque: 280 lb⋅ft (380 N⋅m) @ 3600 rpm; •Fuel type: gasoline; •Fuel system:SEFI; •Configuration: 12V/OHV; •Compression: 8.5:1; •Aspiration: supercharged
- Transmission: 1992–97: 4-speed 4T60-E automatic 1992–96: 4-speed 4T60E-HD auto 1998–99: 4-speed 4T65-E automatic 1997–99: 4-speed 4T65E-HD automatic

Dimensions
- Wheelbase: 110.8 in (2,814 mm)
- Length: 1992–95 SE: 199.5 in (5,067 mm); 1992–95 SSE & 1992–93 SSEi: 201.1 in (5,108 mm); 1996–97 SE: 201.7 in (5,123 mm); 1996–99 SSE: 203.1 in (5,159 mm); 1998–99 SE: 202.0 in (5,131 mm)
- Width: 1992–97: 74.5 in (1,892 mm); 1998–99: 74.4 in (1,890 mm)
- Height: 55.7 in (1,415 mm); 1998–99 SSE: 56.0 in (1,422 mm)
- Curb weight: 3,446–3,588 pounds (1,627 kg)

The ninth generation Bonneville debuted on February 8, 1991, at the 1991 Chicago International Auto Show, with sales launching in July 1991 for the 1992 model year. The exterior featured an aerodynamic drag coefficient of .305; the interior featured a trunk pass-through; and two available engines: the naturally-aspirated 3.8-liter V6 and its supercharged variants. Both engines used a 4-speed overdrive automatic transmission. The ninth generation Bonneville was the first General Motors vehicle available with dual front passenger airbags.

Developed over a 4½-year period from 1986 to early 1991 under program director Dave Mitchell, styling work took place from 1987 to 1988, with a final design by John Folden chosen in 1988 and frozen for production that same year. The first prototypes were built in 1989 and entered testing in mid-1989. In August 1990, production preparation began, with early production "builds" constructed during late 1990. The first series production models were assembled in May 1991, with SE variants launched in July 1991.

Entry trim was the SE, the only trim with available six-passenger seating; the SSE was the mid-level trim, and the SSEi was the new top-level trim, which received a standard passenger-side airbag. According to Pontiac, the trim acronyms had no implied meaning. The base and mid-level models offered GM's naturally-aspirated 3.8-liter V6, and the SSEi received its supercharged variant. All engines used a 4-speed overdrive automatic transmission. SSEi models received dual airbags and antilock brakes. SE and SSE models received a driver-side airbag and optional ABS. The SSE models came with standard ABS and traction control.

The new N/A 3800 Series I (RPO: L27) engine was used, producing 170 hp (127 kW) and 225 lbf⋅ft (305 N⋅m), as well as the newly designed force inducted Series I 3800 (RPO: L67) equipped with an Eaton M62 roots type supercharger which made 205 hp (153 kW) and 260 lbf⋅ft (353 N⋅m). The newly revised N/A L27, for the 1992 model year only, was not equipped with an EGR Valve, and can be distinguished by its white intake manifold, as opposed to black from 1993 and on. Abridged safety options list:

	ABS	Traction control	Driver airbag	Passenger airbag
92 SE	Optional (SLE)	Optional	Standard	N/A
92 SSE	Standard	Optional	Standard	Optional
92 SSEi	Standard	Standard	Standard	Standard
93 SE	Standard	Optional	Standard	Optional
93 SSE	Standard	Optional	Standard	Optional
93 SSEi	Standard	Standard	Standard	Standard
94 SE	Standard	Optional	Standard	Standard
94 SSE	Standard	Optional	Standard	Standard
94 SSEi	Standard	Standard	Standard	Standard
95 SE	Standard	Optional	Standard	Standard
95 SSE	Standard	Optional	Standard	Standard
95 SSEi	Standard	Standard	Standard	Standard

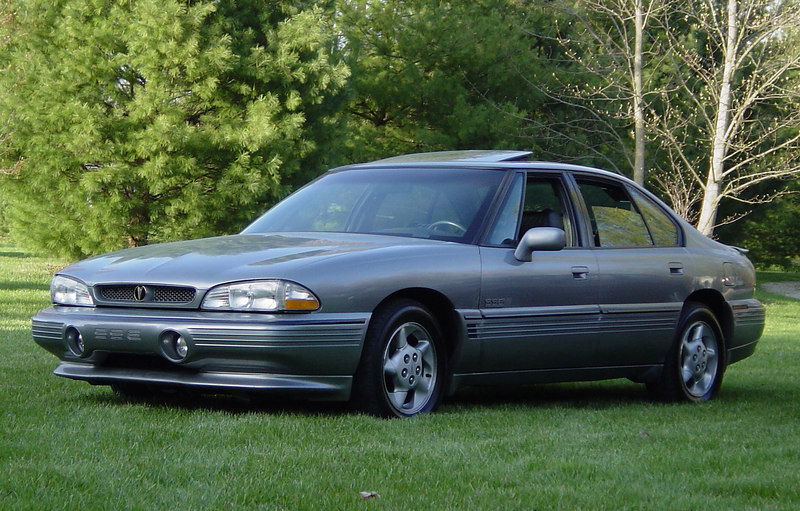
1995 Pontiac Bonneville SSE

1993: Beginning with the 1993 model year, the Bonneville SE could be optioned with a Sport Luxury Edition (SLE RPO: H4U) package, which included leather seats, electronic climate control, automatic headlights, premium sound, "crosslace" alloy wheels, a small console in the headliner, chrome delete side and bumper moldings, center shift console, and touring suspension. Certain equipment such as electronic climate control and premium sound could be deleted from an SLE equipped car. Through 1997, SE models equipped with the Supercharged engine option, required the SLE/H4U package. These carried SE emblems, and the SLE/H4U appeared on the Series Production Identification (SPID) label of equipped vehicles as a Regular Production order (RPO) code. For 1998, SLE emblems were added to the vehicle exterior. The SLE trim continued onto the 1999 model year. Many more standard was included with the SSE trim. The SSEi came standard with most of the available options in the lower models, as well as the supercharged 3800 engine (RPO: L67).

1994: For 1994, SSEi trims used a new Generation III Eaton M62 supercharger with integral OBD-1.5 capabilities, raising the horsepower to 225 hp (168 kW) and torque to 275 lbf⋅ft (373 N⋅m). There was also the introduction of the new five-spoke "Torque Star" wheels; and exhaust resonator to lower the engine's tone; and front passenger airbag. The former SSEi trim level became an SSEi Supercharger Package. Traction control became optional for the '94 SSE trims, which included GM's Computer Command Ride suspensions, designed to reduce body lean and pitch and automatically adjust the suspension from soft to firm when cornering, accelerating, or stopping.

1995: For 1995, SE and SSE trims received the naturally aspirated Series II 3800 engine (RPO: L36) making 205 hp (153 kW) and 230 lbf⋅ft (310 N⋅m). The SSEi was equipped with the Series I SC 3800 (RPO: L67) engine until the 1996 model year, when it too was updated.

=== 1996–1999 ===
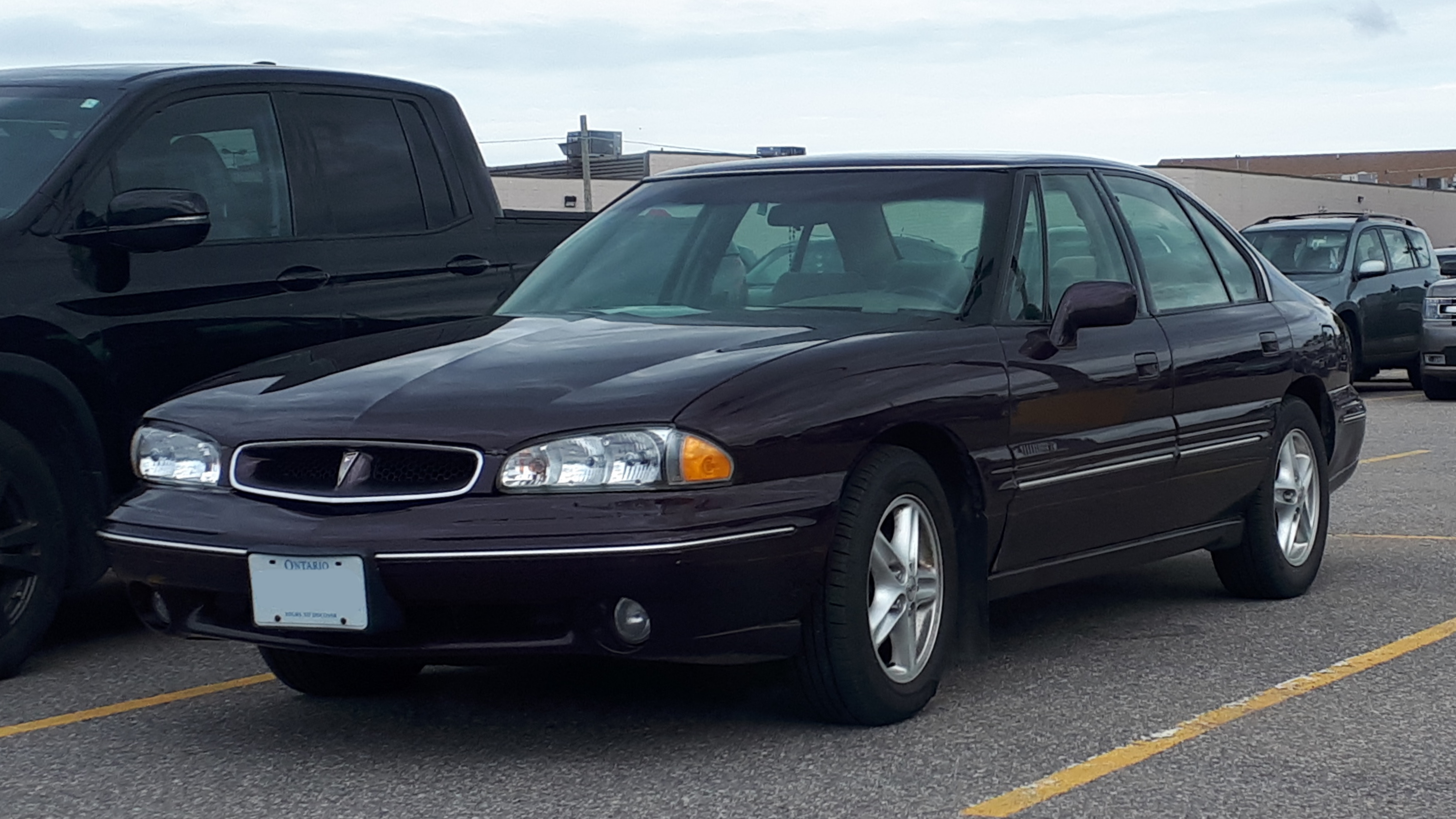
1996-1999 Pontiac Bonneville

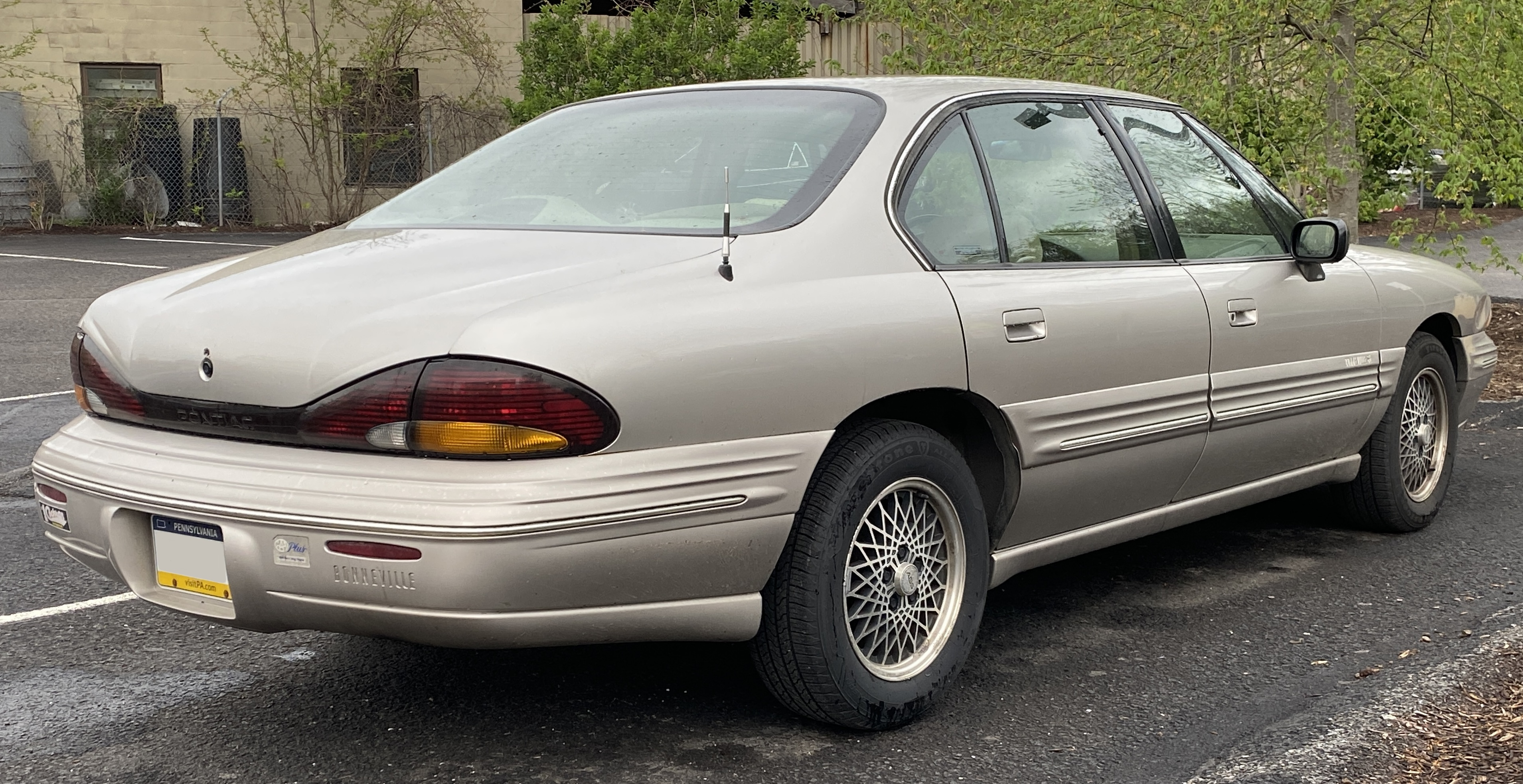
Pontiac Bonneville Rear View 1996-1999

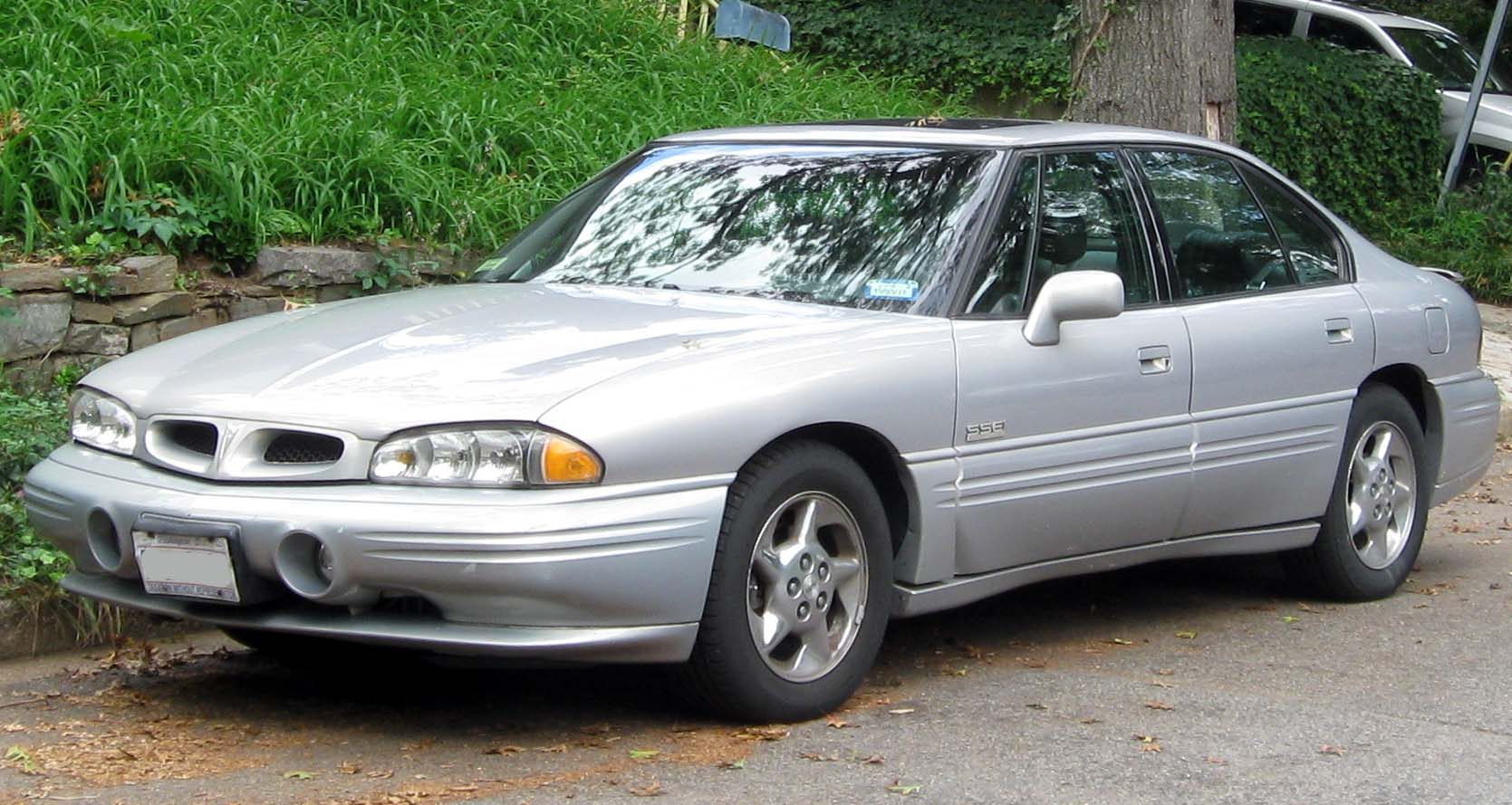
Pontiac Bonneville SSEi

1996: In September 1995, styling changes were introduced for the 1996 model year facelift, with revised tail lights, headlights, grille, and lower body cladding. Trim levels largely shared common lower cladding approaches, with the SSEi again receiving a unique front bumper and grille. Also for 1996, the supercharged version of the 3800 Series II engine was introduced. The SSEi received a new Eaton M90-supercharged L67 engine, producing 240 hp (179 kW) and 280 lbf⋅ft (380 N⋅m) optional on the SSE trim. The engine was used from 1995 until it was retired from the Bonneville in 2003.

SE trim variants could be ordered with the L67 engine, which in turn required the Luxury Edition (SLE)(RPO H4U) package, which included a small console in the headliner, cobra head shifter, performance/normal shift selection buttons, leather interior, chrome delete side and bumper moldings, center shift console, and touring suspension. From 1995 to 1997, SLE/H4U equipped Bonnevilles carried SE rather than SLE external badging.

1997: For 1997, a heavy-duty version of the 4T65E-HD was introduced for the SSEi models. Also in 1997, to mark the 40th year of production of the Bonneville, Pontiac offered a 40th Anniversary Edition, in six trims: the SE, the 40th Anniversary SE, the SSE, the 40th Anniversary SSE, the SSEi, and the 40th Anniversary SSEi. The 40th anniversary models all had a VIN with Y40. With a total production of 637 units, the 40th Anniversary SSEi is the rarest model.

1998: For 1998, the Bonneville gets no major changes. However, a new transmission, the 4T65-E was introduced for the naturally aspirated 3800 installed in SE and SSE models. For 1999, the Bonneville essentially stood pat since an all-new model would arrive in 2000.

In March 2008, GM announced that these engines and other GM engines supplied with Dexcool antifreeze coolant might be prone to intake manifold failure and other problems with the cooling system if proper regular maintenance is not correctly performed. After settlement of a class-action lawsuit, GM agreed to compensate owners of many vehicles that suffered damage, regardless of negligence on the part of the consumer, if the consumer could prove damages.

Engine availability

- 170 hp (130 kW) L27 - SE (92-94), SLE (93-94), SSE (92-94)
- 205 hp (153 kW) L36 - SE (95-99), SLE (95-99), SSE (95-99)
- 205 hp (153 kW) L67 - SSE (92-93) optional, SSEi (92-93)
- 225 hp (168 kW) L67 - SLE (95) optional, SSEi (94-95)
- 240 hp (180 kW) L67 - SLE (96-97) optional, SSE (97) optional, SSEi (96-99)

Production by trim level
Year	SE	SSE	SSEi
1992	95,402	13,034	7,566
1993	79,764	12,792	6,168
1994	66,727	7,462	5,968
1995	80,852	6,168	4,822
1996	61,568	3,833	4,060
1997	61,287	8,282	4,446
1998	58,411	3,641	3,413
1999	No production breakdown available		

== Tenth generation (2000–2005) ==
Tenth generation
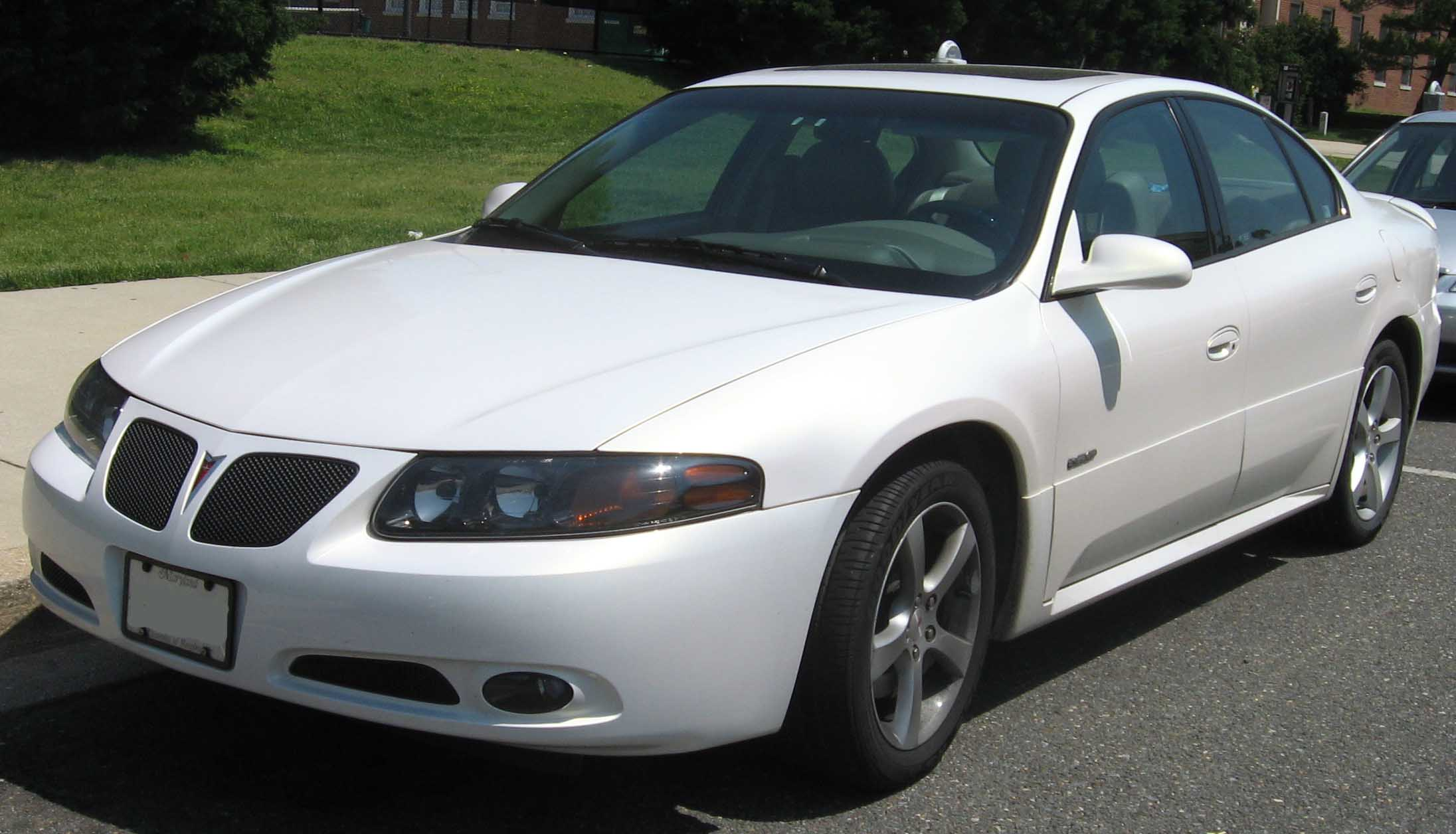
- Bonneville GXP

Overview
- Production: March 1999 – May 27, 2005
- Model years: 2000–2005
- Assembly: Lake Orion, Michigan, U.S. 2000–2005; Hamtramck, Michigan, U.S. 2004–2005
- Designer: Wayne Cherry (1996)

Body and chassis
- Body style: 4-door sedan
- Layout: Transverse front-engine, front-wheel drive
- Platform: G platform/GMX310
- Related: Oldsmobile Aurora; Buick LeSabre; Cadillac Seville

Powertrain
- Engine: 3.8 L Series II L36 V6 Specifications: Years Used: 2000–2005; •Family: GM Buick 90° V6; •Model: Series II 3800; •RPO/VIN: L36/K; •Displacement: 3,791 cc (231 cu in); •Stroke: 3.40 in (86 mm); •Bore: 3.80 in (97 mm); •Power: 205 hp (153 kW) @ 5200 rpm; •Torque: 230 lb⋅ft (312 N⋅m) @ 4000 rpm; •Fuel Type: Gasoline; •Fuel System:SEFI; •Configuration: 12V/OHV; •Compression: 9.4:1; •Aspiration: Normal; 3.8 L Series II L67 V6 Specifications: Years Used: 2000–2003; •Family: GM Buick 90° V6; •Model: Series II Supercharged 3800; •RPO/VIN: L67/1; •Displacement: 3,791 cc (231 cu in); •Stroke: 3.40 in (86 mm); •Bore: 3.80 in (97 mm); •Power: 240 hp (179 kW) @ 5000 rpm; •Torque: 280 lb⋅ft (380 N⋅m) @ 3200 rpm; •Fuel Type: Gasoline; •Fuel System:SEFI; •Configuration: 12V/OHV; •Compression: 8.5:1; •Aspiration: Supercharged; 4.6 L Northstar LD8 V8 Specifications: Years Used: 2004–2005; •Family: GM Premium 90° V8; •Model: Cadillac Northstar; •RPO/VIN: LD8/Y; •Displacement: 4,570 cc (279 cu in); •Stroke: 3.31 in (84 mm); •Bore: 3.66 in (93 mm); •Power: 275 hp (205 kW) @ 5600 rpm; •Torque: 300 lbf⋅ft (407 N⋅m) @ 4000 rpm; •Fuel Type: Gasoline; •Fuel System:SEFI; •Configuration: 32V/DOHC; •Compression: 10.0:1; •Aspiration: Normal
- Transmission: 4-speed 4T65-E automatic 4-speed 4T65E-HD automatic 4-speed 4T80-E automatic

Dimensions
- Wheelbase: 112.2 in (2,850 mm)
- Length: 2000–01 SE: 202.5 in (5,140 mm); 2000–01 SLE & SSEi: 203.2 in (5,160 mm); 2002–05: 202.6 in (5,150 mm)
- Width: 74.2 in (1,880 mm)
- Height: 2000–01 SE: 56.0 in (1,420 mm); 2000–01 SLE & SSEi: 56.4 in (1,430 mm); 2002–05: 56.6 in (1,440 mm)
- Curb weight: 3,596 lb (1,631 kg) (SE); 3,656 lb (1,658 kg) (SLE); 3,745 lb (1,699 kg) (SSEi)

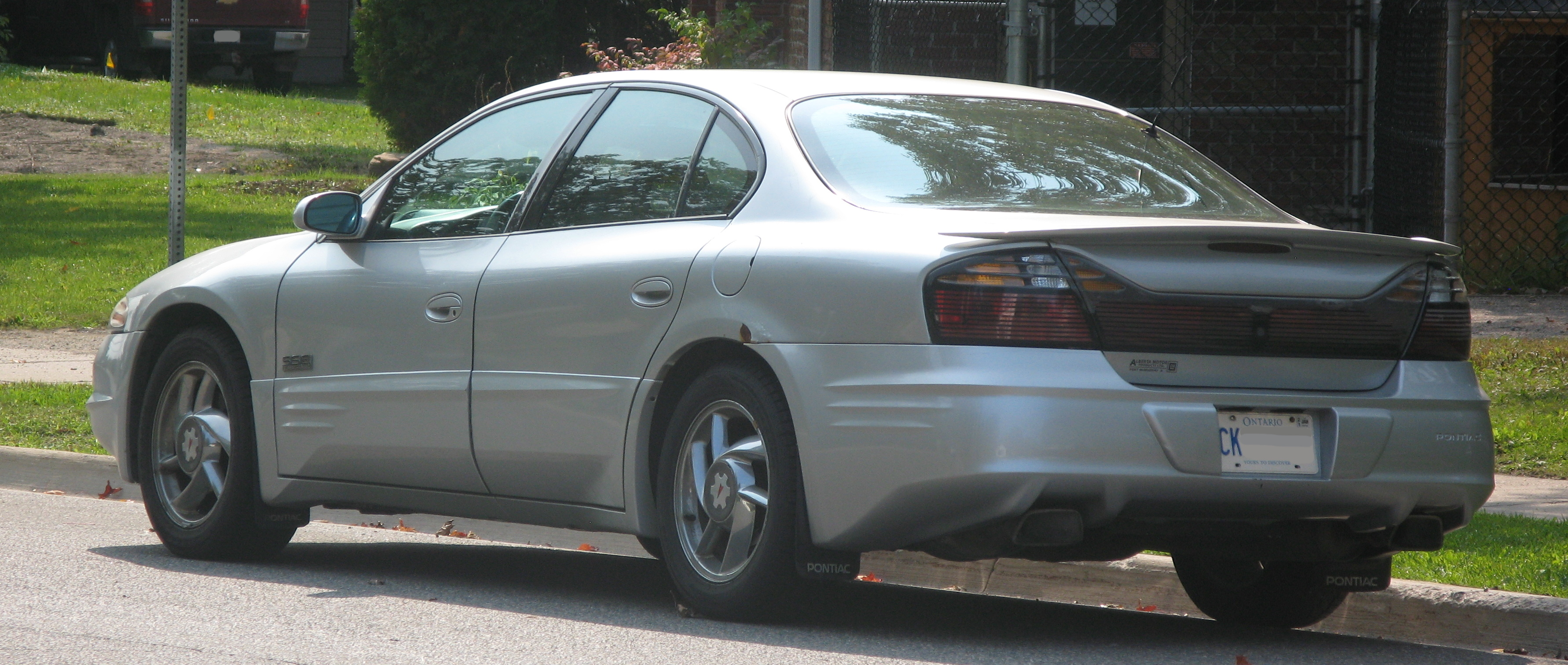
Rear view (2000-2003 SSEi)

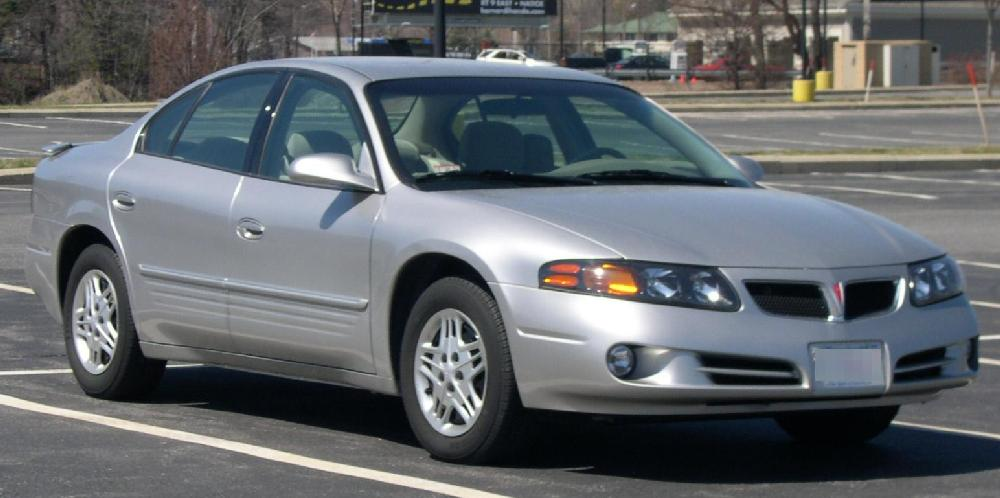
2003 Pontiac Bonneville

The 2000 Bonneville was restyled, using GM's G platform, with the widest overall track in its competitive class at 62.6 in (1,590 mm) up front and 62.1 in (1,580 mm) in the rear. GM's StabiliTrak stability control system was introduced on the top-of-the-line supercharged SSEi model, later replaced by the GXP.

=== Trim levels ===
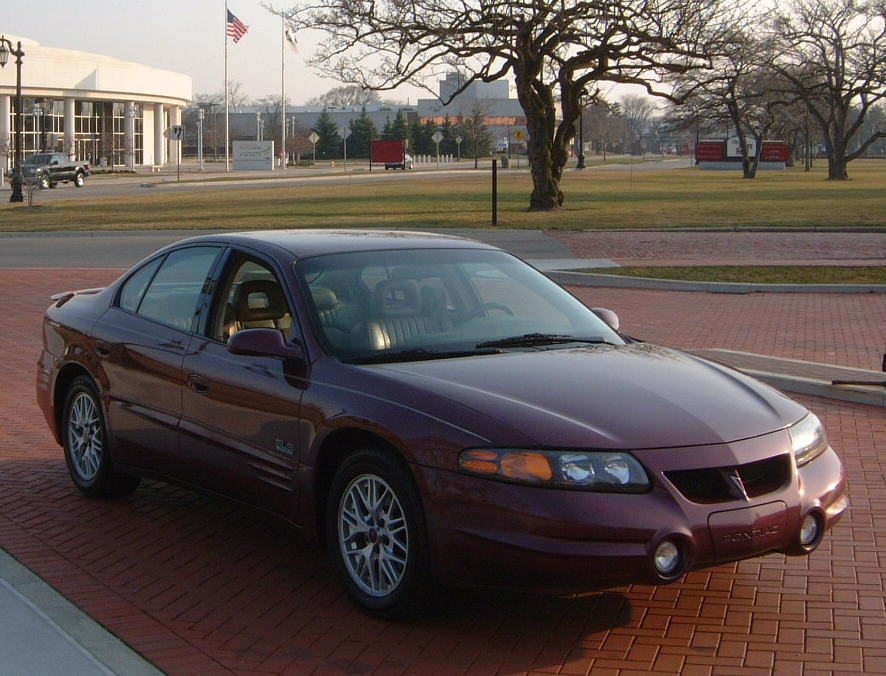
Pontiac Bonneville SLE

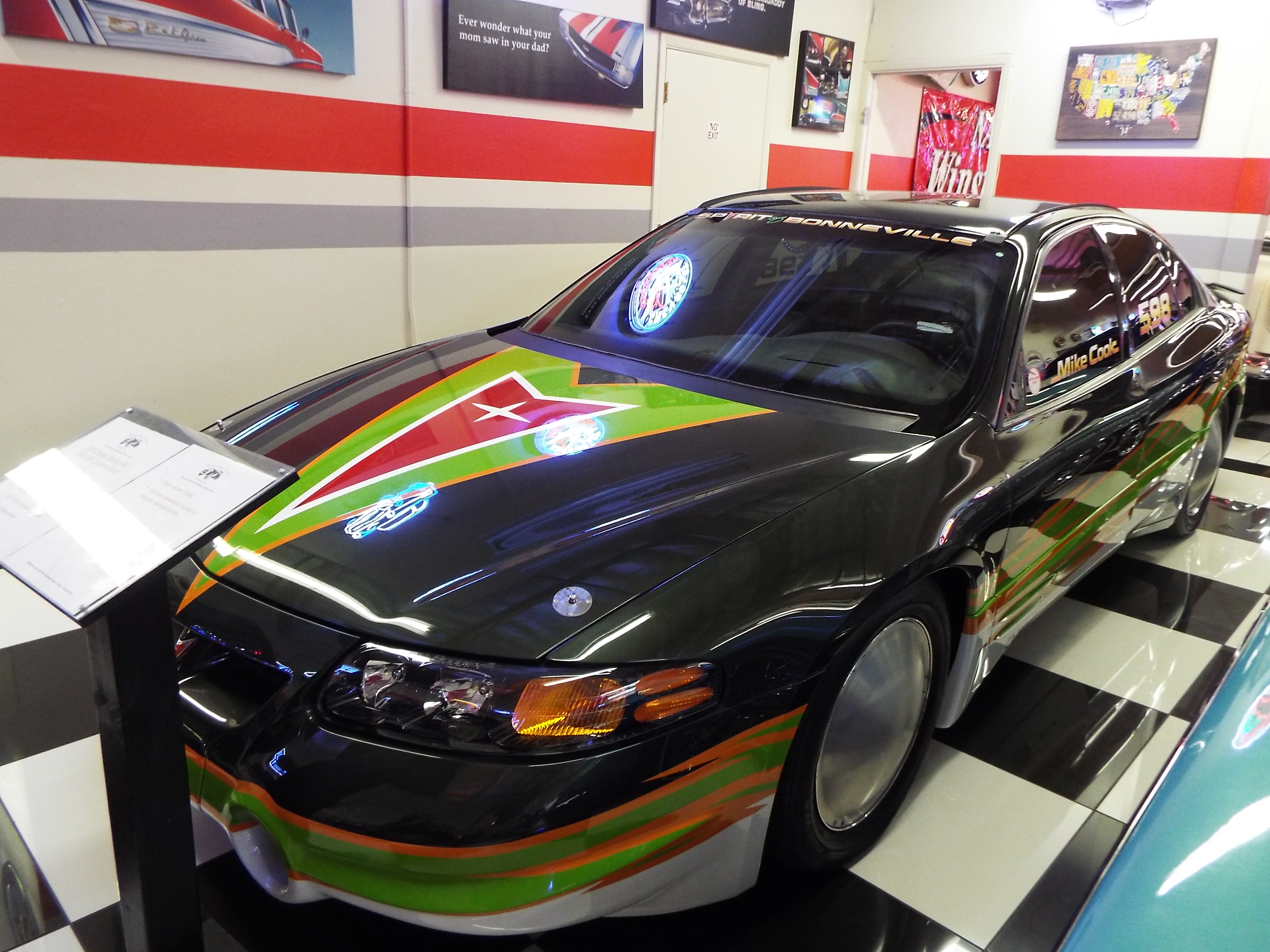
2000 Pontiac Bonneville Salt Flats Custom Racer which set a 204 mph world record for a front wheel drive sedan on display in the Martin Auto Museum

The Bonneville was marketed in three trim levels: SE, SLE and SSEi. The SE came with a 3.8L V6 engine, 4-speed automatic transmission, air conditioning, cruise control, front bucket seats (a 55/45 split front bench was available on the SE only), 6-way power driver seat with lumbar adjustment, AM/FM stereo with CD player and 225/60/R16 tires. The SLE added traction control, OnStar, leather-wrapped steering wheel, rear spoiler and 17-inch alloy wheels wrapped in 235/55/R17 tires. The SSEi adds a 3.8L supercharged V6 engine, front-side air bags, leather upholstery, 12-way power driver seat and Monsoon AM/FM stereo with cassette and CD player.

For the last year of production, Pontiac gave the mid-level SLE the new GXP styling. The 2005 SLE featured all GXP styling cues, except the wheels, badging, muffler tips and engine all remained unique to the GXP.

=== Return of the V8 ===
For 2004, the Bonneville regained a V8 option on the GXP trim. This was the first time since 1986 that a Bonneville had a V8 engine. As a result of the discontinuation of the Oldsmobile Aurora, this opened up a "hole" in the GM lineup between Pontiac and Buick, allowing Pontiac to expand upmarket somewhat. The engine is Cadillac's 4.6 L (280 cu in) Northstar V8, producing 275 hp (205 kW), 300 lbf⋅ft (410 N⋅m). As Pontiac's website said, "With GXP, V8 power gets reintroduced into the Bonneville line in the form of the world-renowned 4.6 L (279 in^{3}) Northstar V8 engine, giving 0 to 60 mph (0–97 km/h) in 6.5 seconds demonstrates better performance than BMW 330i and 530i, and Lexus ES. Its 3.7:1 final drive ratio is the most aggressive found on any car in its class."

=== Safety ===
NHTSA crash tests for the 2005 Pontiac Bonneville resulted in a safety rating of 4-stars for the Driver and 5-stars for the Front Passenger.

=== Discontinuation ===
GM announced on February 8, 2005, that the Bonneville would be dropped from Pontiac's lineup for 2006. The last Bonneville was assembled on May 27, 2005. About 12,000 Bonnevilles were sold in 2005. With more than half of Pontiac dealers also selling Buick models, the Buick Lucerne along with the Chevrolet Impala continued as GM's only mainstream full-size cars until the introduction of the 2008 G8.
