= Buick LeSabre =

American full-size car

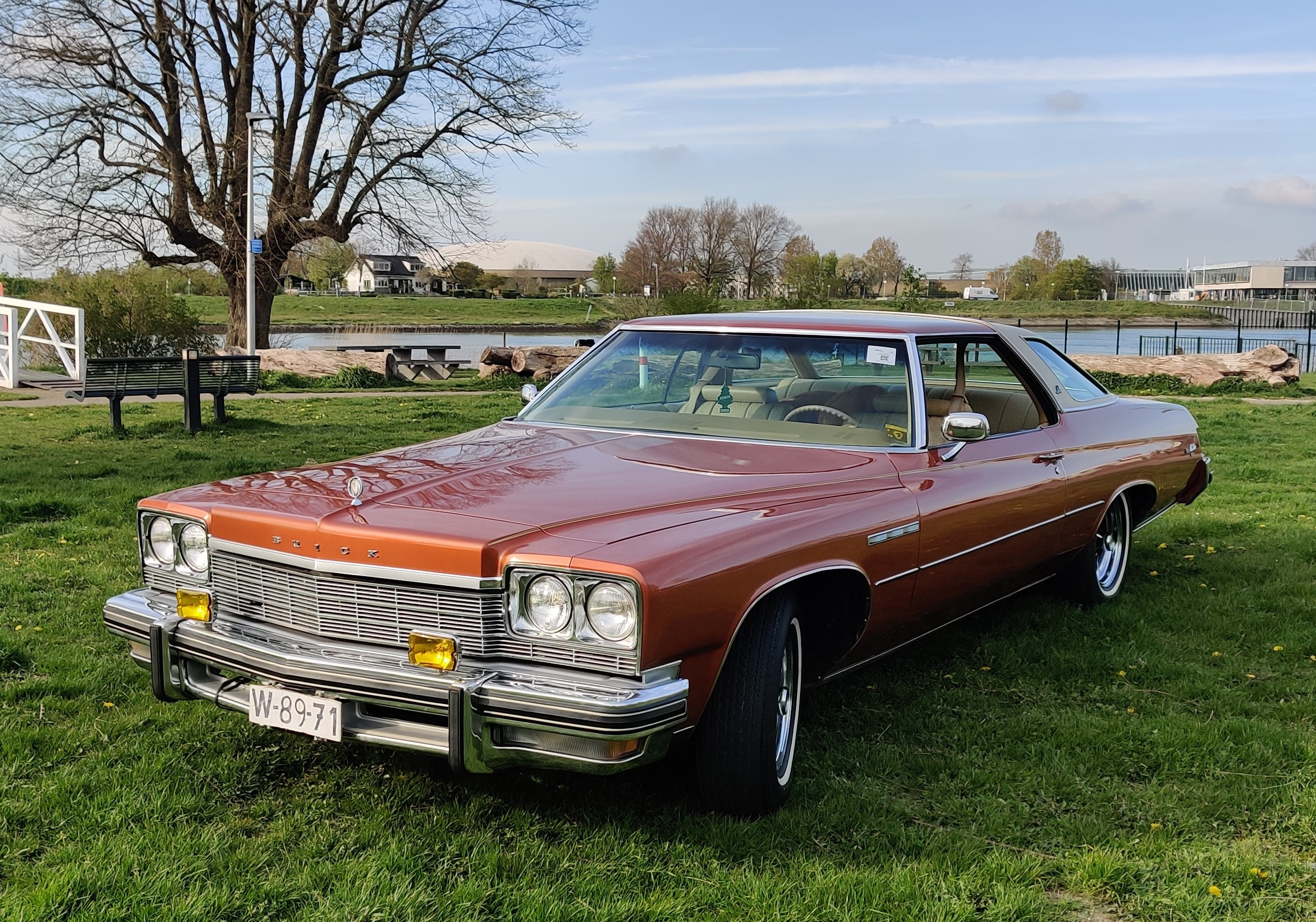
- 1975 Buick LeSabre Custom Hardtop Coupe

Overview
- Manufacturer: Buick (General Motors)
- Model years: 1959–2005

Body and chassis
- Class: Full-size car
- Layout: FR layout (1959–1985); Front-engine, front-wheel drive (1986–2005)

Chronology
- Predecessor: Buick Special
- Successor: Buick Lucerne

The Buick LeSabre is a full-size car made by the division Buick of General Motors from 1959 until 2005. Prior to 1959, this position had been retained by the full-size Buick Special model (1936–58). The "LeSabre", which is French for "the sabre", was Buick's entry-level full-size car throughout all eight of its generations. The LeSabre was available as a 2-door convertible, sedan or hardtop, a 4-door sedan or hardtop and station wagon throughout its production.

== History of model ==
The LeSabre nameplate made its first appearance on the 1951 Le Sabre show car, which introduced the world to aircraft-inspired design elements such as the wrap-around windshield and tail fins. In 1959 LeSabre became the new moniker for what had previously been known as the Buick Special. The Buick LeSabre was offered in a full line of body styles except between 1965 and 1969 when its station wagon variant was dropped from Buick's full-size offerings. In 1977, the LeSabre was downsized along with other GM full-size models, and was available only in pillared coupe, sedan and wagon body styles.

In addition to being Buick's entry level vehicle, the LeSabre was consistently Buick's best selling full-size car. Of the four nameplates introduced in 1959 (LeSabre, Invicta, Electra, Electra 225), the LeSabre nameplate lasted the longest.

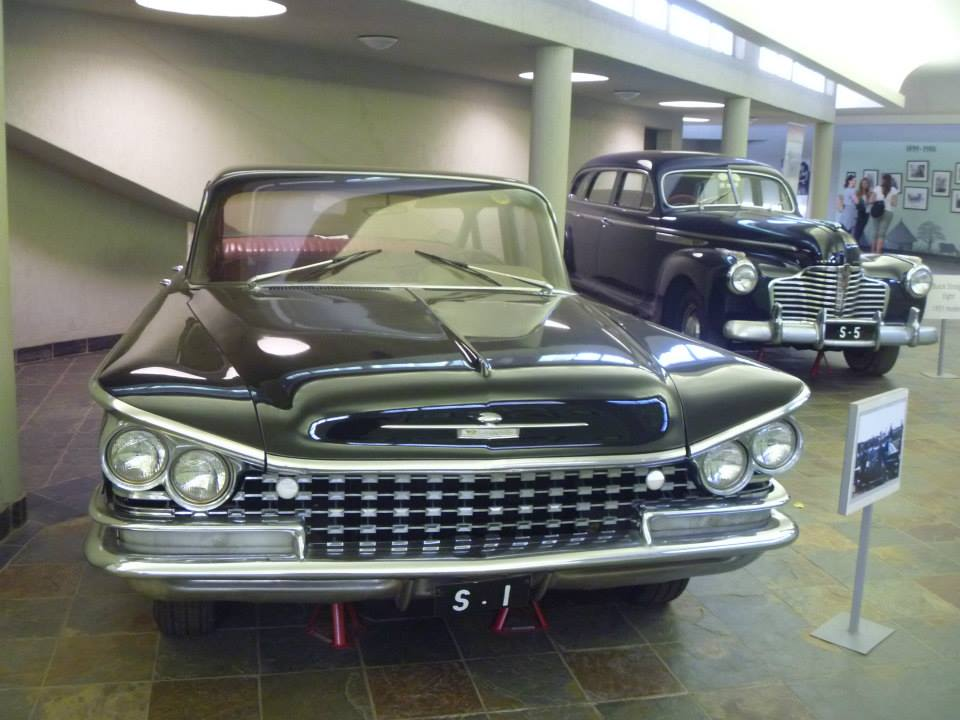
1959 Buick LeSabre, formerly owned by the late king of Swaziland, Sobhuza II. Photographed at the Sobhuza II Memorial Park in Lobamba.

From 1959 to 1961, the LeSabre was powered by a 364 cubic-inch V8, which was smaller than the 401 cubic-inch V8 used in the more expensive Invicta and Electra models. The 364, which was previously used in all Buicks in 1957 and 1958, was rated at 250 hp (186 kW) in standard form with an "economy" 235 hp (175 kW) version offered as a "no cost" option in 1960-61 and an optional power-pack version with four-barrel carburetor and dual exhausts that was rated at 300 hp (224 kW). For 1962–63, the LeSabre came standard with a two-barrel carbureted version of the 401 V8 rated at 280 hp (209 kW), or a no-cost "economy" low-compression version rated at 260 hp (194 kW). Starting in 1964, all LeSabre models except the Estate Wagon shared their drivetrains with the midsize Buick models by switching to those models' smaller-displacement V8s at least as standard equipment for the next few years with cubic-inch displacements of 300 (1964–65), 340 (1966–67) and 350 (1968–76). A large-displacement would not reappear in a LeSabre until 1970 when a 455 cubic-inch V8 was introduced as an option and was offered through 1976. Beginning with the downsized 1977 models and continuing through three subsequent generations of front-drive LeSabres introduced in 1986, 1992 and 2000, Buick's 3.8-liter (231 cubic-inch) V6 would become the standard engine for most LeSabre models and V8 engines were dropped (except in station wagons) after the last of the rear-drive LeSabre sedans and coupes came off the line in 1985.

For most years from 1959 to 1971, a three-speed manual transmission was standard equipment on all LeSabres but rarely ordered. Far more popular was the Turbine Drive automatic transmission (previously known as Dynaflow) along with power steering and power brakes. For 1961 and 1962, the automatic transmission was standard on the LeSabre and all other full-sized Buicks but in 1963 was moved back to the option list on LeSabres. For 1964, the Dynaflow-based Turbine Drive was replaced by two new automatic transmissions, the two-speed Super Turbine 300 and the three-speed Super Turbine 400. A four-speed manual transmission was offered as a LeSabre option from 1963 to 1965 but only a small number of cars were so equipped. Automatic transmissions would once again reappear as standard equipment on LeSabres in mid-1971 and continue in such form until the model line's demise after 2005.

LeSabres were rear-drive six-passenger vehicles from 1959 to 1985 (station wagons through 1990) featuring separate body-on-frame construction along with a longitudinally mounted front engine. The first downsized generation of LeSabres introduced in 1977 retained the rear-drive and body-on-frame construction, while the later-generation models introduced in 1986 switched to front-wheel-drive, unit-body construction and transversely mounted engine. Convertibles were offered each year through 1975 while two- and four-door hardtops were dropped after 1976 and only pillared body styles were offered from 1977 to 2005. Station wagons were offered through 1964 and then dropped for several years until being reintroduced in 1970 and continued until 1990 after which year they were moved to the revived Roadmaster series. LeSabres come in two versions: Custom and Limited.

== First generation (1959–1960) ==
First generation
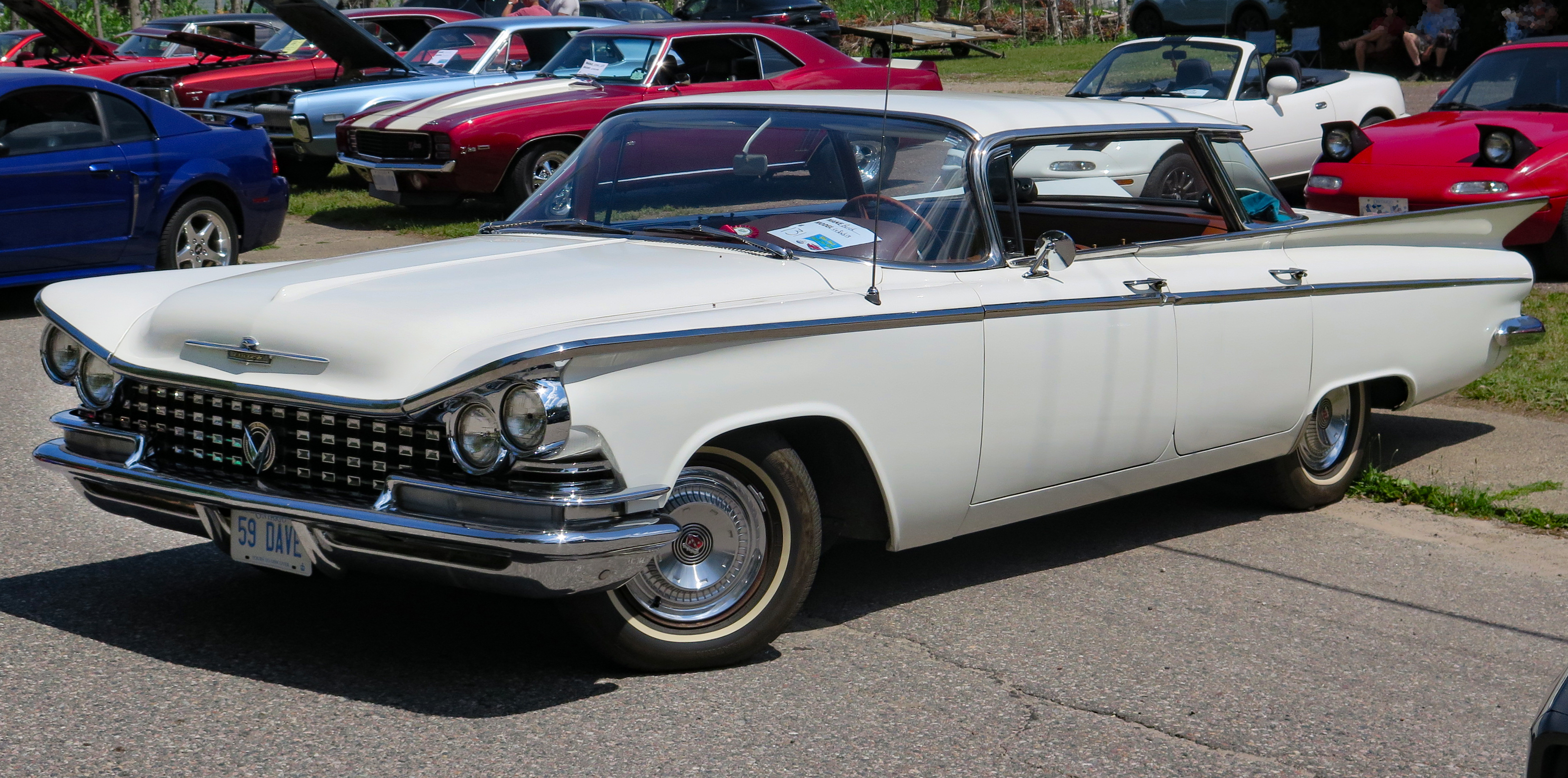
- 1959 LeSabre four-door hardtop

Overview
- Model years: 1959–1960
- Assembly: (main plant); Flint, Michigan, USA (Buick City) (branch assembly); Arlington, Texas, USA (Arlington Assembly); Doraville, Georgia, USA (Doraville Assembly) "Atlanta"; Kansas City, Kansas, USA (Fairfax Assembly); Linden, New Jersey, USA (Linden Assembly); South Gate, California, USA (South Gate Assembly); Wilmington, Delaware, USA (Wilmington Assembly)

Body and chassis
- Body style: 2-door convertible 2-door sedan 4-door sedan 2-door hardtop 4-door hardtop 4-door station wagon
- Layout: FR layout
- Platform: B-body
- Related: Chevrolet Impala; Oldsmobile Super 88; Pontiac Bonneville; Pontiac Parisienne (Canada Only); Pontiac Strato Chief (Canada Only)

Powertrain
- Engine: 364 cu in (6.0 L) 250 hp (190 kW) V8
- Transmission: 3-speed manual 2-speed Dynaflow automatic

Dimensions
- Wheelbase: 123.0 in (3,124 mm)
- Length: 217.4 in (5,522 mm) (1959); 217.9 in (5,535 mm) (1960)
- Width: 80.7 in (2,050 mm) (1959); 80.0 in (2,032 mm) (1960)
- Curb weight: 4,255–4,679 lb (1,930–2,122 kg)

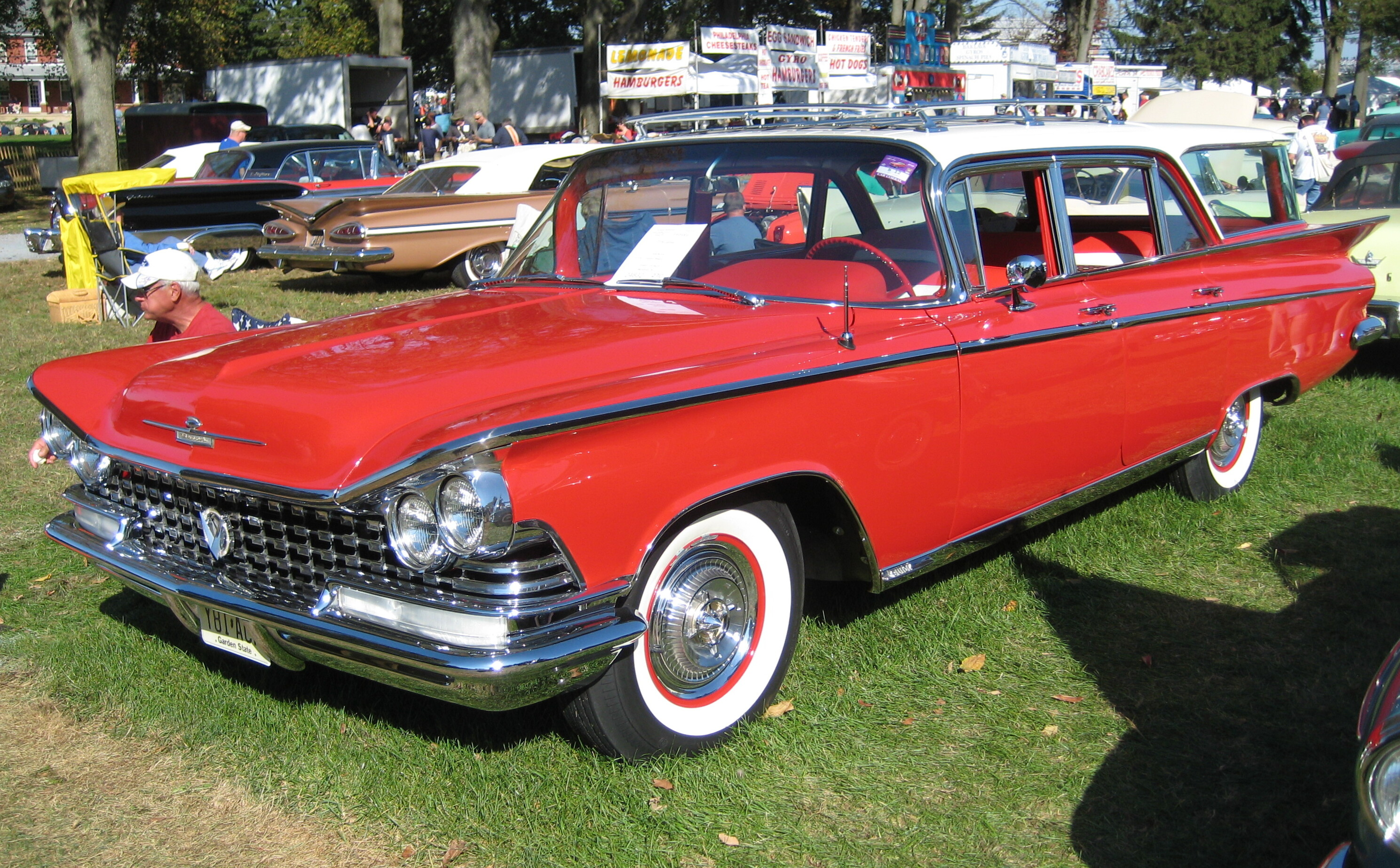
1959 Buick LeSabre Estate Wagon

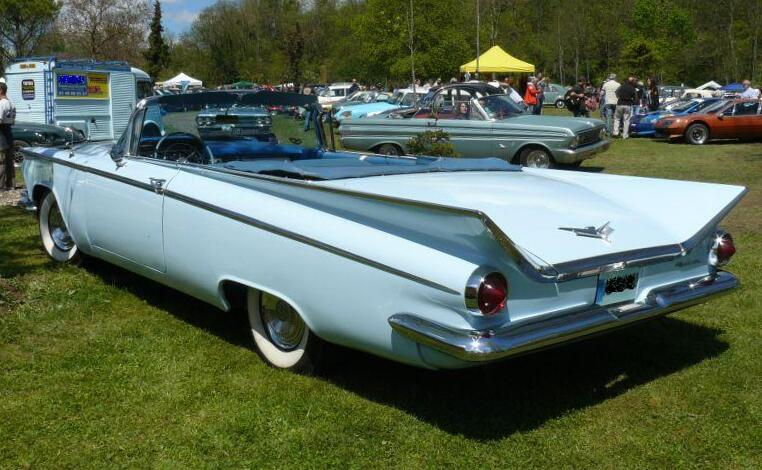
1959 Buick LeSabre convertible

LeSabre and all other 1959 Buicks not only got new names, but all-new styling as well, adopting the new GM B- and C-body used on all of the corporation's full-sized cars (the larger C-body used in the Electra as well as the Oldsmobile 98 and all Cadillacs was basically a stretched out B-body rather than a distinct body and chassis for 1959–60). Wheelbases increased by one inch on all models. The new styling included slanted headlights in front along with a chrome square grille somewhat similar to the 1958 Buick and "Delta-wing" fins back along with round taillights. The appearance was shared with two other Buick models, the mid-level Invicta and the top model Electra.

While Invicta and Electra/225 models were powered by Buick's new 401-cubic-inch V8, LeSabre continued with the 364-cubic-inch V8 previously used in all Buicks in 1957 and 1958. In standard form, the engine delivered 250 horsepower with a two-barrel carburetor and 10.25 to 1 compression ratio (with Dynaflow transmission; manual transmission cars had a lower 8.5 to 1 compression ratio but horsepower was still rated at 250). Optionally available was a four-barrel version of the 364 rated at 300 horsepower. A three-speed manual transmission was standard on LeSabre but most cars were built with the optional two-speed Dynaflow automatic transmission that was standard equipment on the Invicta and Electra/225. A three-speed "Triple Turbine" Dynaflow variant was also available. Power steering and power brakes were optional and all 1959 Buicks used the unique 12-inch finned aluminum brake drums for improved stopping power that were originally introduced on the 1957 Roadmaster.

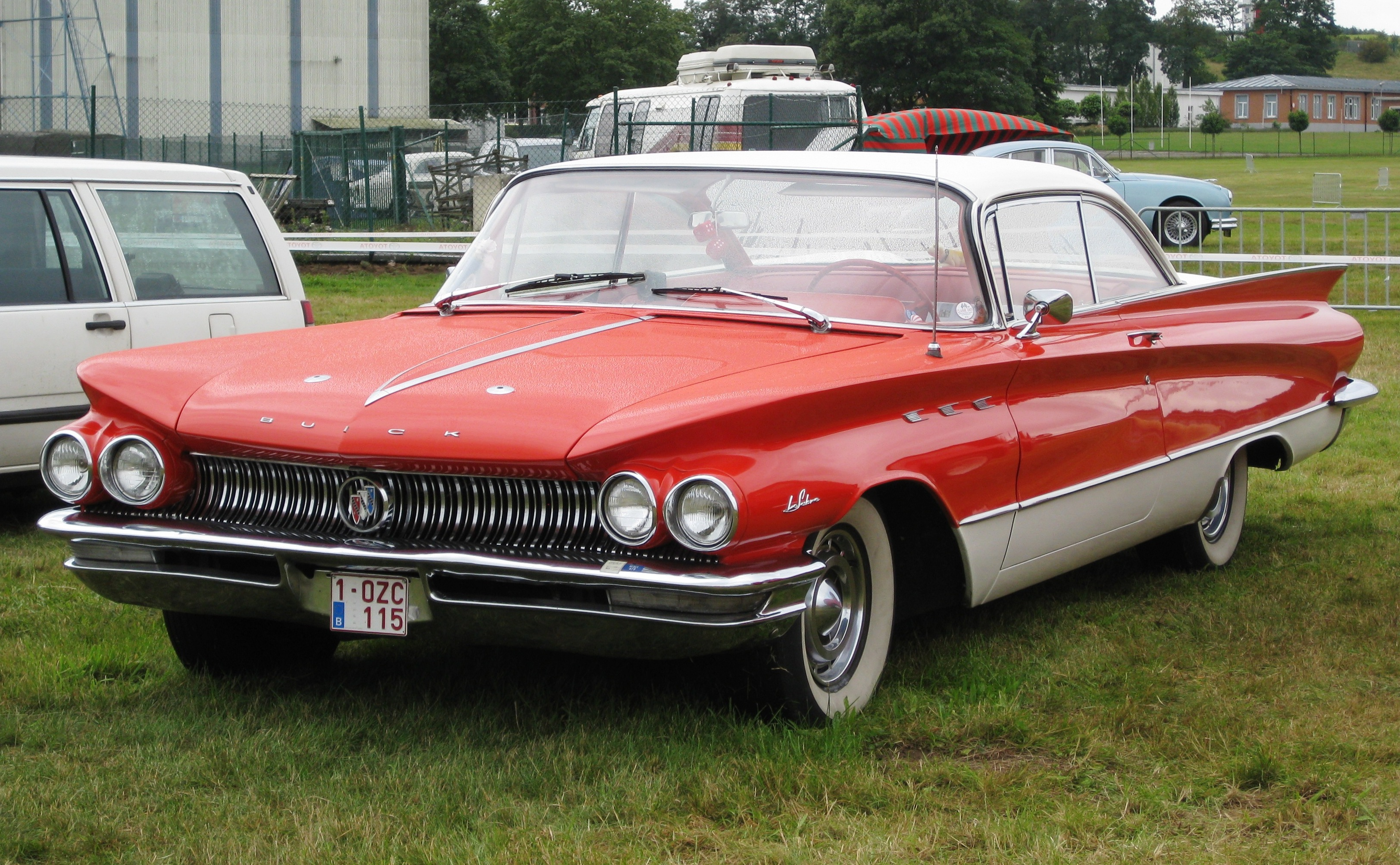
1960 Buick LeSabre Two-Door Hardtop

The 1960 LeSabre received a major facelift, the new body design sharing only the roof and trunk lid with the 1959 model. The new Buick now sported a concave grille and horizontal headlights centered by Buick's then-new "Tri-Shield" logo, which is still in use today. Reintroduced to Electras and other Buicks for 1960 were the chrome "VentiPort" portholes first introduced in 1940 and last seen in 1957. LeSabre and Invicta models had three portholes while Electras and Electra 225s were "four-holers". Inside, a revised instrument panel featured "Mirromatic", where the speedometer, odometer and any warning light indicators are reflected from an adjustable tilt mirror inside the dashboard for comfortable viewing that would reduce unwanted glare and reflection. A new two-spoke steering wheel with horn bars was introduced, replacing the time-honored horn ring then still common to most automobiles. The 250- and 300-horsepower 364-cubic-inch V8s were continued from 1959, but a new no-cost option was a 235-horsepower lower-compression two-barrel version of the 364 with a lower compression ratio to permit use of regular-grade gasoline instead of the premium fuel required with all other Buick engines.

== Second generation (1961–1964) ==
Second generation
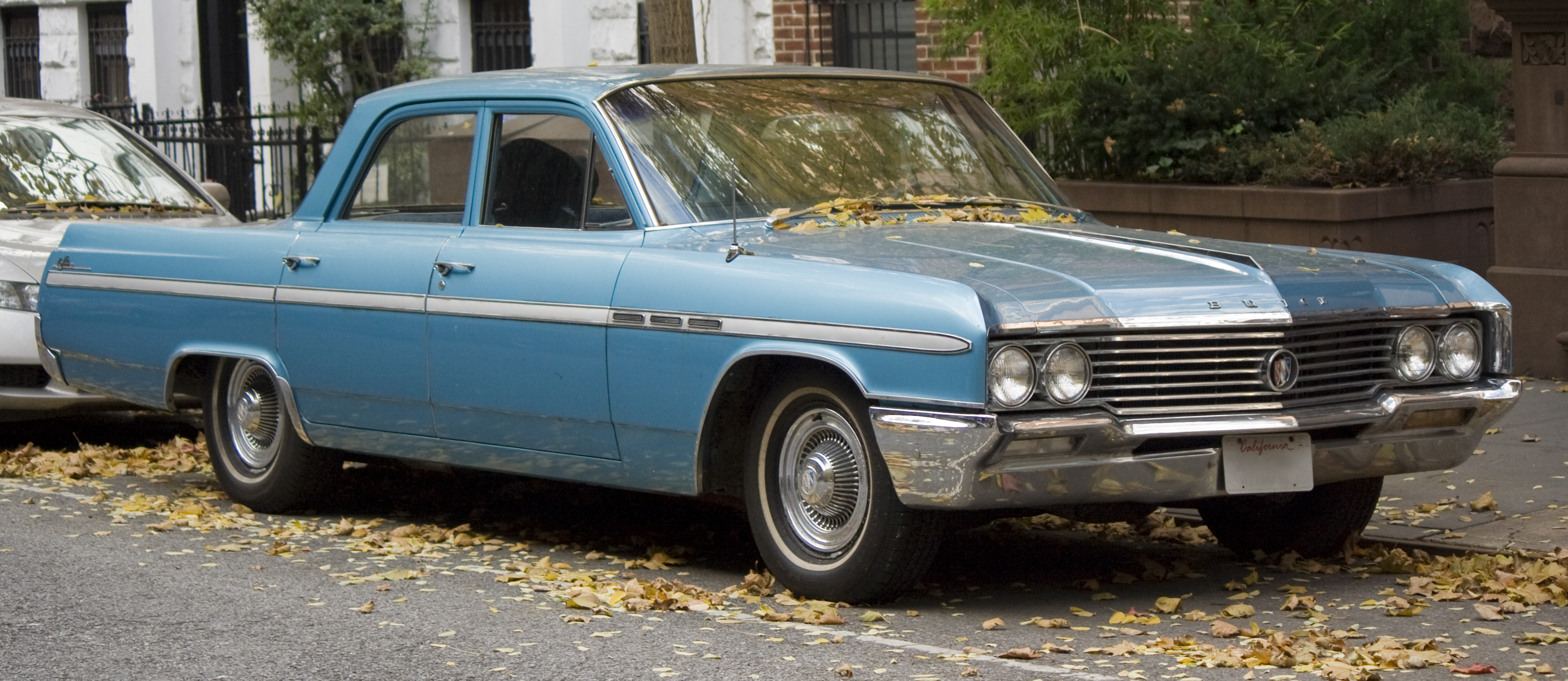
- 1964 LeSabre Custom Sedan

Overview
- Model years: 1961–1964
- Assembly: (main plant); Flint, Michigan, USA (Buick City) (branch assembly); Doraville, Georgia, USA (Doraville Assembly) "Atlanta"; Kansas City, Kansas, USA (Fairfax Assembly); Linden, New Jersey, USA (Linden Assembly); South Gate, California, USA (South Gate Assembly); Wilmington, Delaware, USA (Wilmington Assembly)

Body and chassis
- Body style: 2-door sedan 2-door hardtop 2-door convertible 4-door sedan 4-door hardtop 4-door station wagon
- Layout: FR layout
- Platform: B-body

Powertrain
- Engine: 300 cu in (4.9 L) Small-Block V8; 364 cu in (6.0 L) Nailhead V8; 401 cu in (6.6 L) Nailhead V8
- Transmission: 3/4-speed manual; 2/3-speed Dynaflow automatic

Dimensions
- Wheelbase: 123.0 in (3,124 mm)
- Length: 213.2 in (5,415 mm) (1961); 214.1 in (5,438 mm) (1962); 215.7 in (5,479 mm) (1963)
- Width: 78.0 in (1,981 mm)
- Curb weight: 3,969–4,505 lb (1,800–2,043 kg)

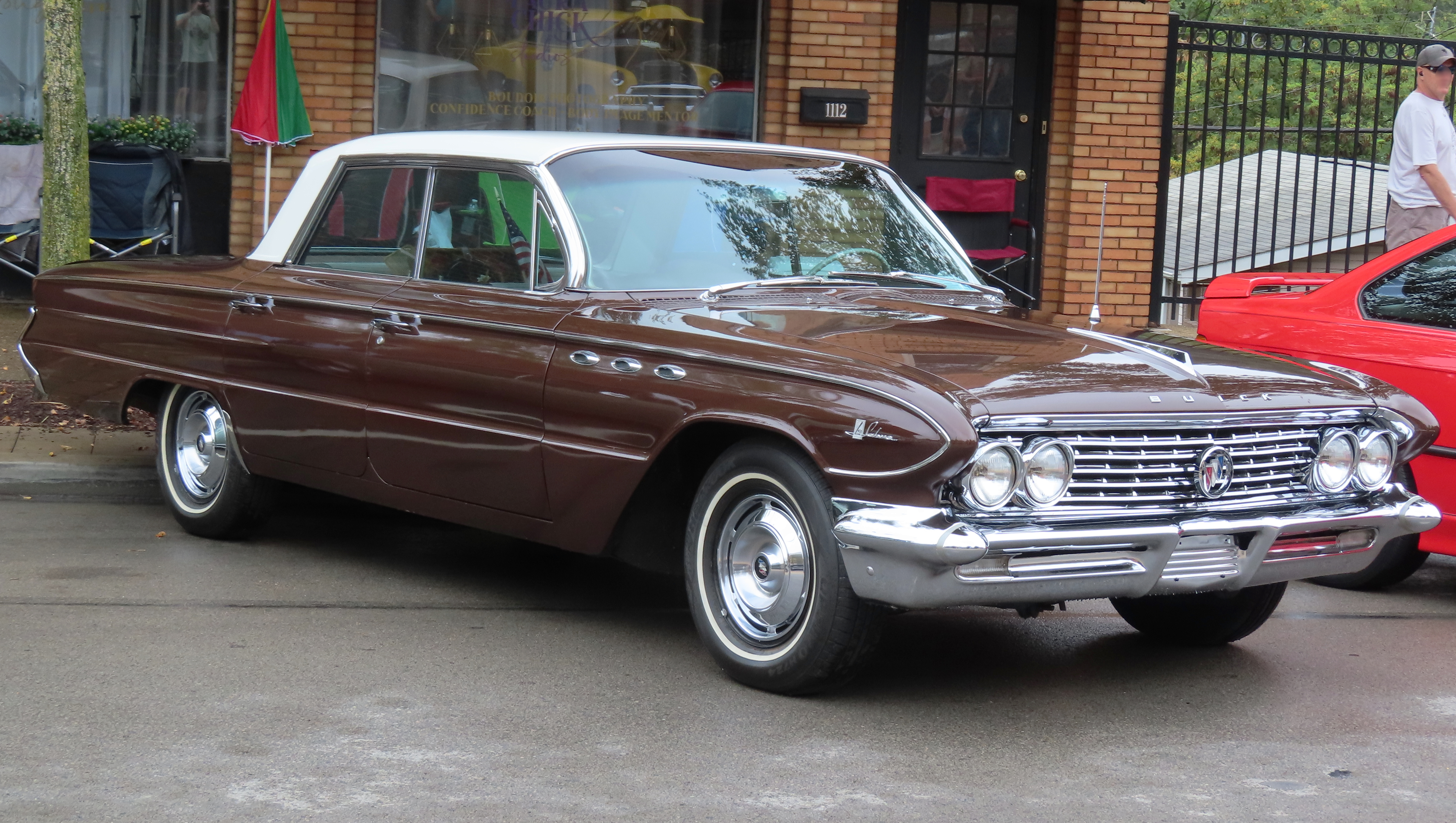
1961 Buick LeSabre 4-door hardtop

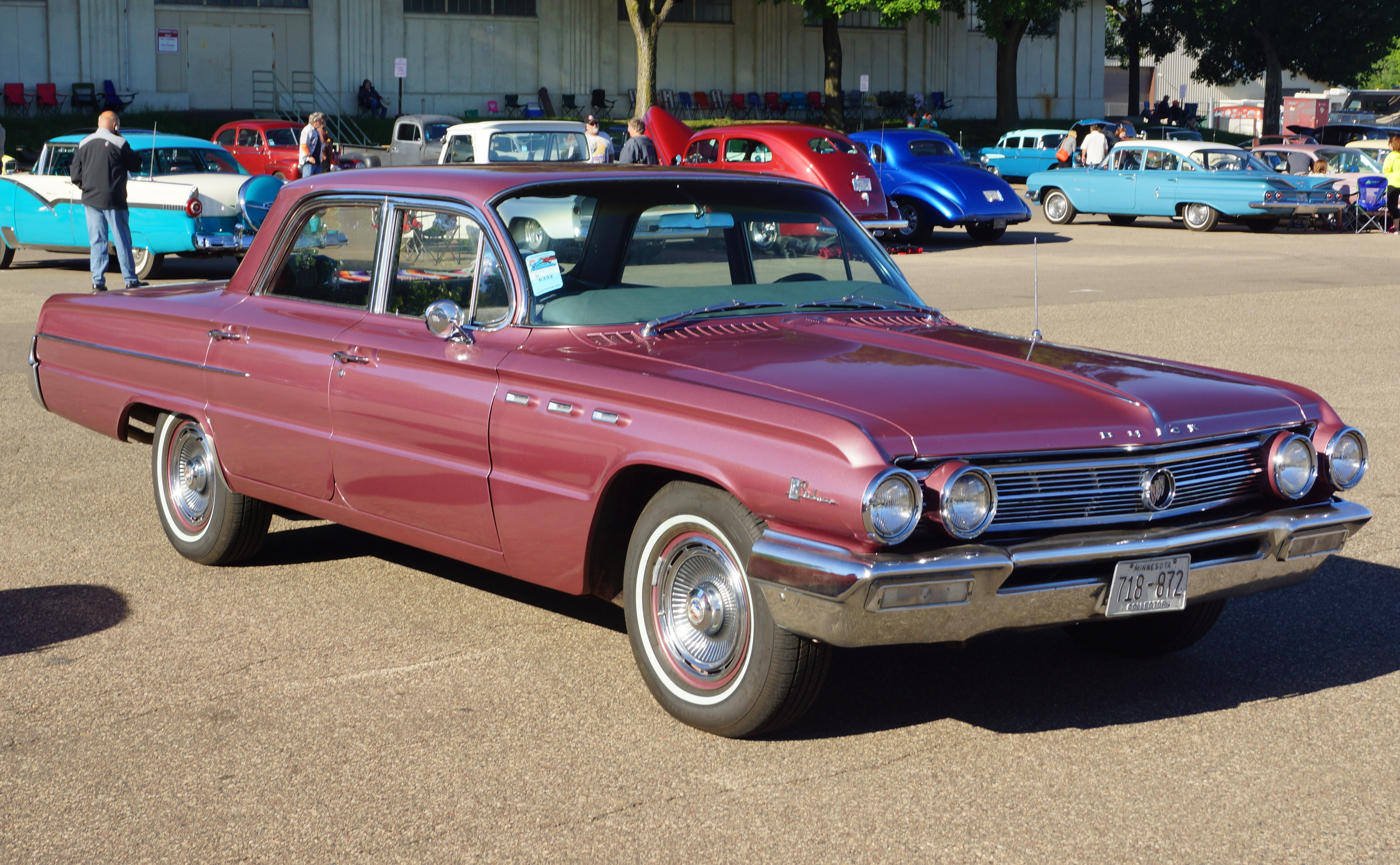
1962 Buick LeSabre 4-door Sedan

LeSabre and all other full-sized Buicks (joined by the compact Special this year) were completely restyled for 1961 featuring finless rear ends, more restrained use of chrome, and boxier sheetmetal. Wheelbases remained at 123 inches (3,100 mm) but the new cars were slightly downsized in both length and width, and rode on a new X-frame chassis which included a conventional rear axle and driveshaft replacing the decades-old torque tube design. Inside were revised instrument panels retaining the "Mirrormatic" speedometer and new upholstery trims.

The Estate station wagons received a "Cordaveen" vinyl interior as standard, with the regular cloth/Cordaveen combination interior available as an option. Engines were unchanged from previous years including the standard 250-horsepower 364-cubic-inch V8, no-cost regular fuel 235-horsepower 364 or the four-barrel 300-horsepower option of same engine available at extra cost. The two-speed Turbine Drive Dynaflow automatic transmission was standard equipment on LeSabres and all other full-sized Buicks this year, although a manual transmission was also available. The Ventiports returned to the side of the front fender denoting the entry-level status in Buick's hierarchy of products offered.

The 1962 LeSabre was only moderately changed from the previous year with bodies taking on a few extra inches to give them a longer look along with new grilles and taillights. Two-door hardtop coupes received a new convertible-like roofline complete with simulated bows. Under the hood, the 364 cubic-inch V8 was replaced by the larger 401 cubic-inch V8 used in Invictas and Electra 225s. LeSabres came standard with a two-barrel high-compression (10.25 to 1) version rated at 280 horsepower with a low-compression regular fuel version of that same engine rated at 265 horsepower offered as a no-cost option. Optional at extra cost was the four-barrel 325-horsepower 401 which was standard on the Invicta, Electra 225 and the mid-year Invicta-based Wildcat coupe. Inside, interiors were mildly revised with the "Mirrormatic" speedometer replaced by a conventional horizontal sweep unit.

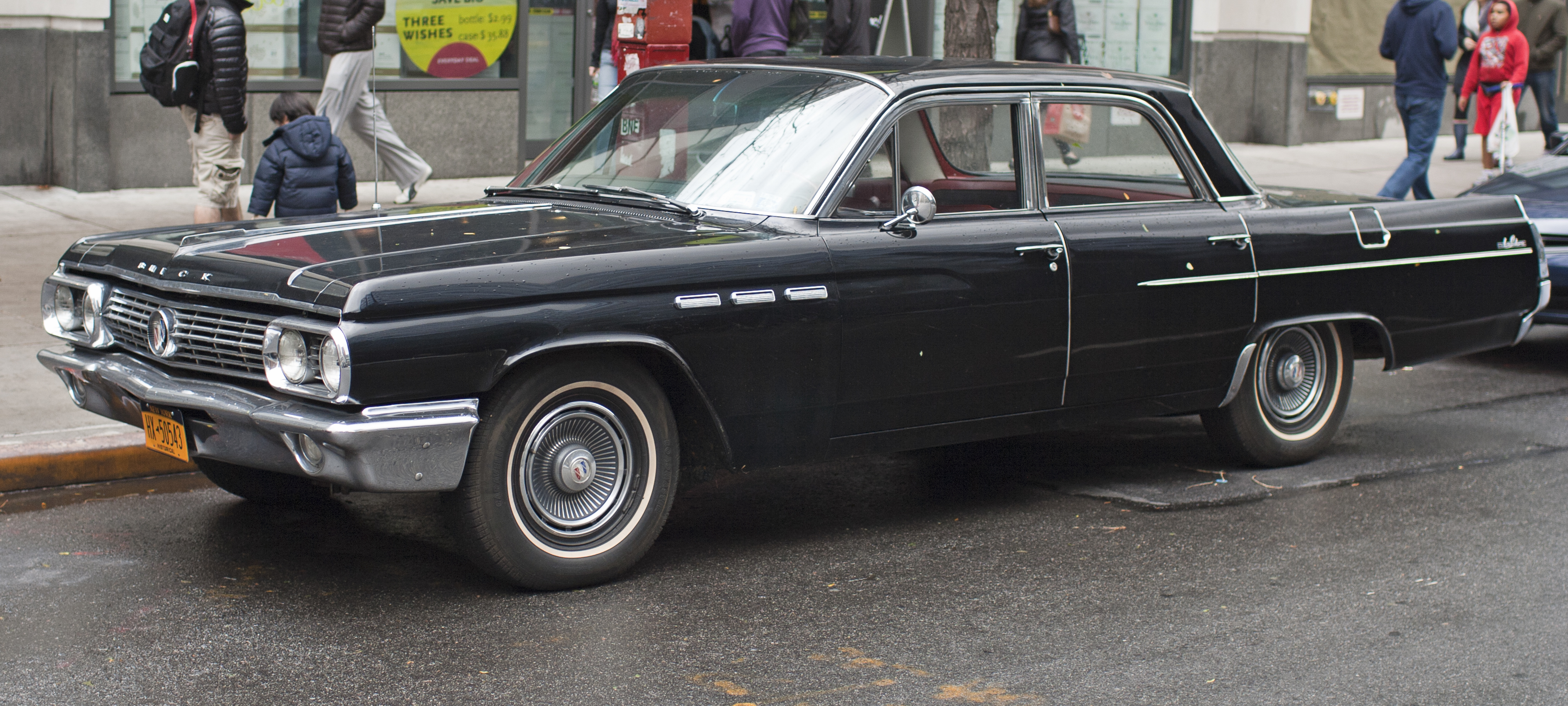
1963 Buick LeSabre 4-door sedan

The 1963 LeSabre received a major facelift with even boxier body contours than 1961-62 models and revised rooflines on four-door hardtop sedans. Inside was a new instrument panel with round instruments shared with other big Buicks and the new personal-luxury Riviera coupe. New options this year included a seven-position tilt steering wheel/column, AM/FM radio and Electro-Cruise control. The same assortment of 401-cubic-inch V8s was carried over from 1962 but the three-speed manual transmission returned as standard equipment with the two-speed Turbine Drive automatic reverted to the option list. A new and rarely ordered option this year was a floor-mounted four-speed manual transmission.

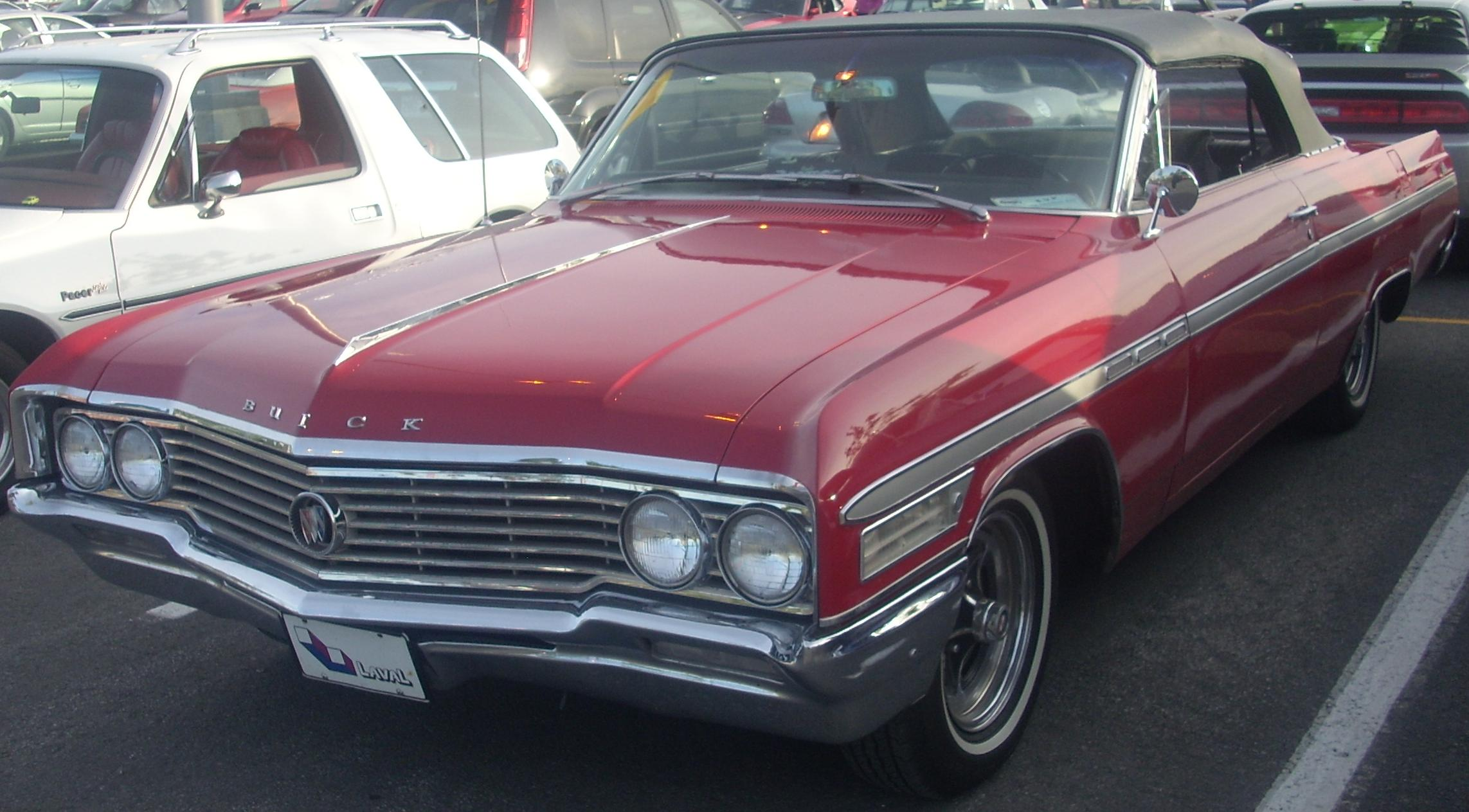
1964 LeSabre 2-door convertible

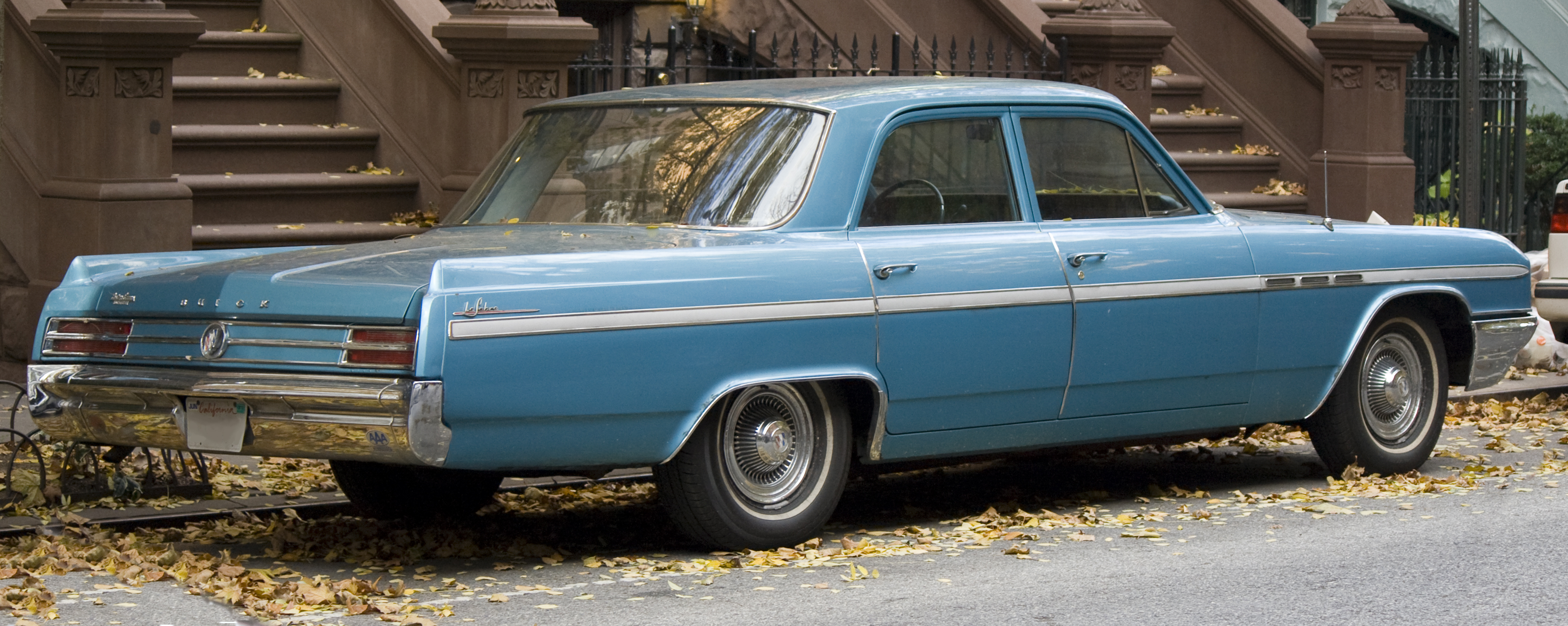
1964 LeSabre Custom Sedan, rear view

Minor facelifting with new grille and horizontal taillights replacing the 1963's vertical units highlighted the 1964 LeSabre. A somewhat better equipped "Custom" version also joined the lineup this year, easily identifiable by its full length chrome side molding with a brushed metal insert. The regular LeSabre had a narrow trim piece on the rear third of the body. Under the hood, the 401-cubic-inch V8 was replaced in LeSabre sedans and coupes by a smaller 300-cubic-inch V8 designed for the upsized Special/Skylark intermediates that replaced the aluminum V8 in those vehicles. In standard form, the 300 was rated at 210 horsepower with two-barrel carburetor and 9 to 1 compression ratio for use of regular fuel. Optionally available was a 250-horsepower version of the same engine with four-barrel carburetor and higher 11 to 1 compression ratio mandating the use of premium fuel. The LeSabre Estate Wagon came standard with the larger 325-horsepower 401 V8 from the Wildcat and Electra 225 models. Replacing the old Dynaflow-based two-speed automatic transmission were two new Super Turbine automatics. The two-speed Super Turbine 300 (shared with the intermediate-sized cars) was available with the standard two-barrel 300 V8 while the three-speed Super Turbine 400 (shared with other big Buicks and Rivieras) was standard with the 300 four-barrel and optional with the standard engine as well as the 401 in the Estate Wagon. The standard transmission with the base 300 two-barrel V8 was a three-speed column shift manual and a four-speed manual was available as an option with either engine. The new ST300 transmission carried over the variable pitch torque converter from the Dynaflow that had been used since the mid-1950s, while the first year for the ST400 featured a fixed-pitch converter. Inside, only minor trim/upholstery revisions were made.

== Third generation (1965–1970) ==
Third generation
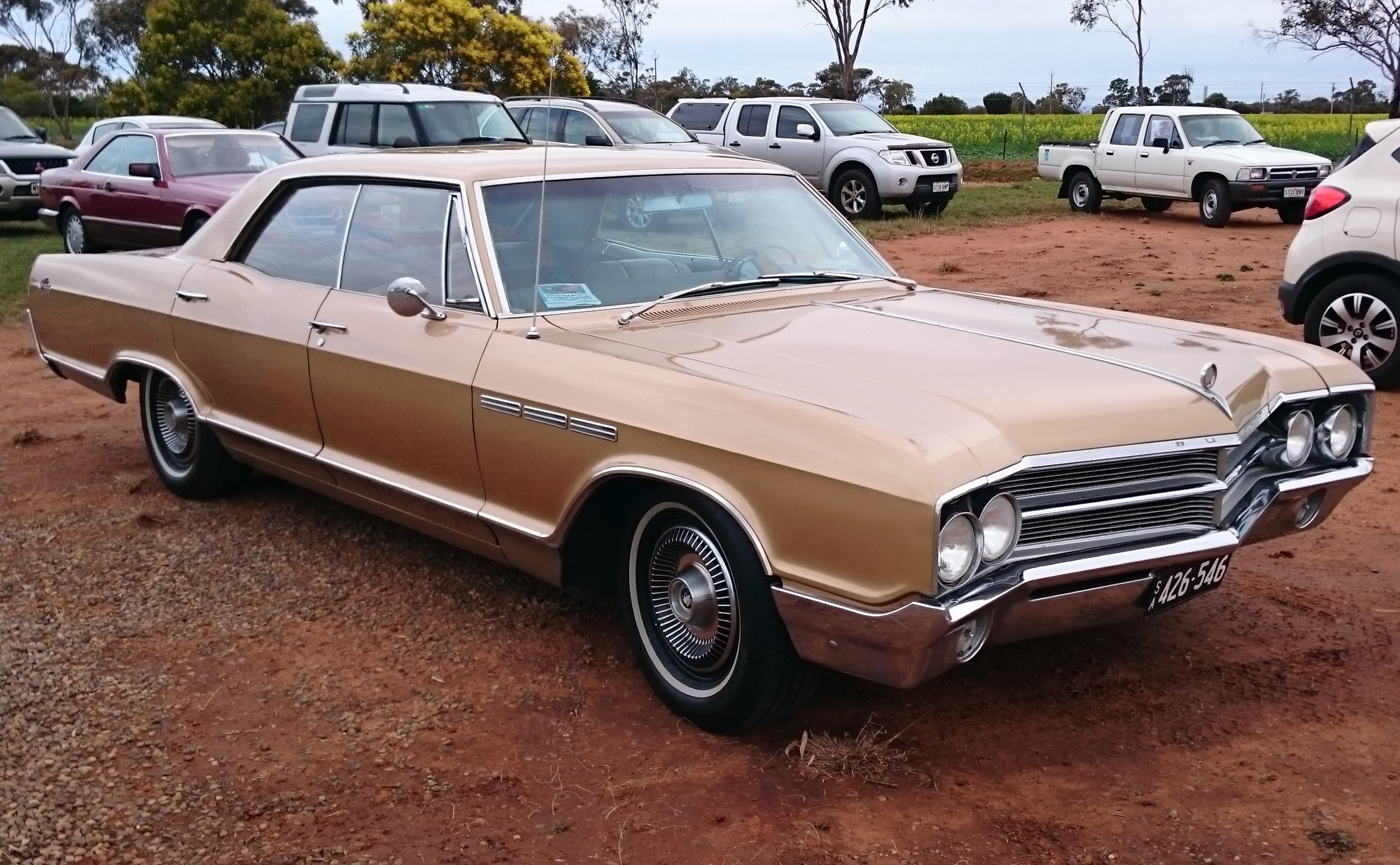
- 1965 LeSabre 4-door Hardtop

Overview
- Model years: 1965–1970
- Assembly: Buick City, Flint, Michigan; Doraville Assembly, Doraville, Georgia; Fairfax Assembly, Kansas City, Kansas; South Gate Assembly, South Gate, California; Wilmington Assembly, Wilmington, Delaware

Body and chassis
- Body style: 2-door convertible 2-door hardtop 4-door sedan 4-door hardtop sedan
- Layout: FR layout
- Platform: B-body
- Related: Chevrolet Bel Air; Chevrolet Impala; Chevrolet Caprice; Chevrolet Biscayne; Pontiac Parisienne; Pontiac Catalina/Laurentian; Pontiac Bonneville

Powertrain
- Engine: 300 cu in (4.9 L) Buick V8; 340 cu in (5.6 L) Buick V8; 350 cu in (5.7 L) Buick V8; 455 cu in (7.5 L) Buick V8
- Transmission: 2-speed ST-300 automatic 3-speed ST-400 automatic 3-speed TH-350 automatic

Dimensions
- Wheelbase: 123 in (3,124.2 mm)
- Length: 206.2 in (5,237.5 mm)
- Curb weight: 3,117–3,651 lb (1,414–1,656 kg)

LeSabre and other full-sized Buicks were completely restyled for the 1965 model year, featuring more rounded bodylines and Coke-bottle profiles with semi-fastback rooflines on two-door hardtop coupes. Wheelbases remained at 123 inches (3,100 mm), but a new perimeter frame shared with other GM B-body cars replaced the "X" frame used since 1961. Body styles were unchanged from 1964 except for the station wagon, which was dropped in favor of the stretched intermediate Special-based Buick Sport Wagon which featured a raised rear roof and glass skylight over the back seat similar to the Oldsmobile Vista Cruiser. Starting in 1965, the LeSabre was available in two trim levels, the base LeSabre and the LeSabre Custom, which featured a more luxurious interior trim and also included the convertible body style not available in the base LeSabre line.

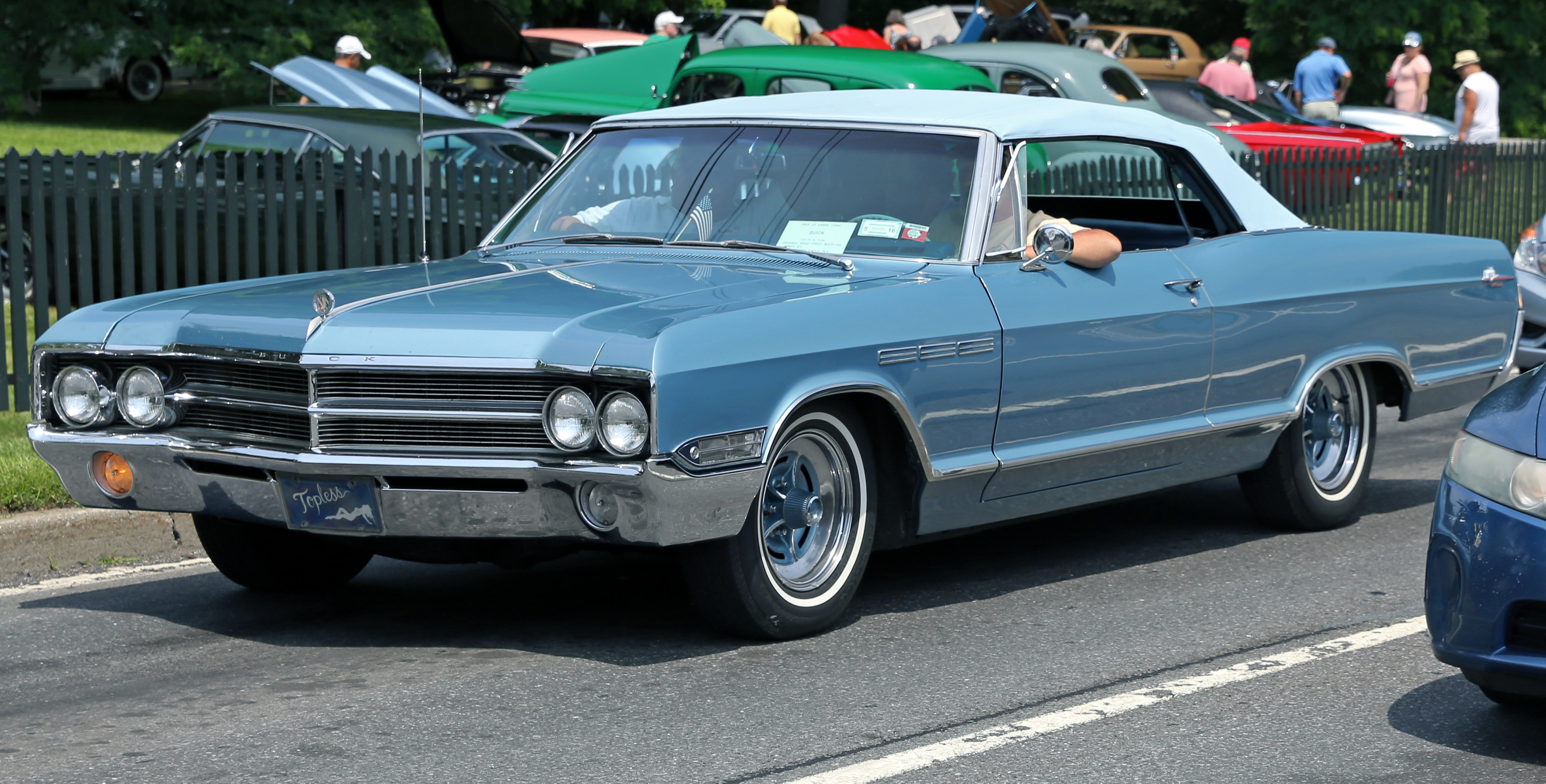
1965 Buick LeSabre Convertible

Interiors were also new for 1965 with a revised instrument panel featuring two round dials nearly identical with the Riviera for speedometer and other instruments much like the 1963–64 models along with new heating/air conditioning controls. Drivetrains were unchanged from 1964 with the 210-horsepower two-barrel carbureted 300-cubic-inch V8 the standard powerplant on all models with a standard three-speed manual transmission or optional four-speed manual or two-speed Super Turbine 300 automatic. Available at extra cost with the new LeSabre "400" package was the 250-horsepower 300-cubic-inch V8 with four-barrel carburetion and 10.25 to 1 compression which required premium fuel, compared to the standard two-barrel engine that used regular fuel. The 400 package also included the more desirable Super Turbine "400" three-speed automatic transmission also found in Buick's higher-priced Wildcat, Electra 225 and Riviera models. Buick's engine–transmission practice was similar to that of GM's Chevrolet Division, which at that time only offered the two-speed Powerglide automatic with most of its engine offerings in full-sized vehicles, requiring buyers who preferred the similar three-speed Turbo-Hydramatic (basically the same transmission under a different name) to order one of the larger V8 engines. Both Pontiac and Oldsmobile offered the Turbo Hydra-Matic on all of their full-sized cars with any engine offering, and three-speed automatics were also the norm on big cars from GM's medium-priced competitors such as the Chrysler Newport and Mercury Monterey, which offered the TorqueFlite and Cruise-O-Matic transmissions, respectively.

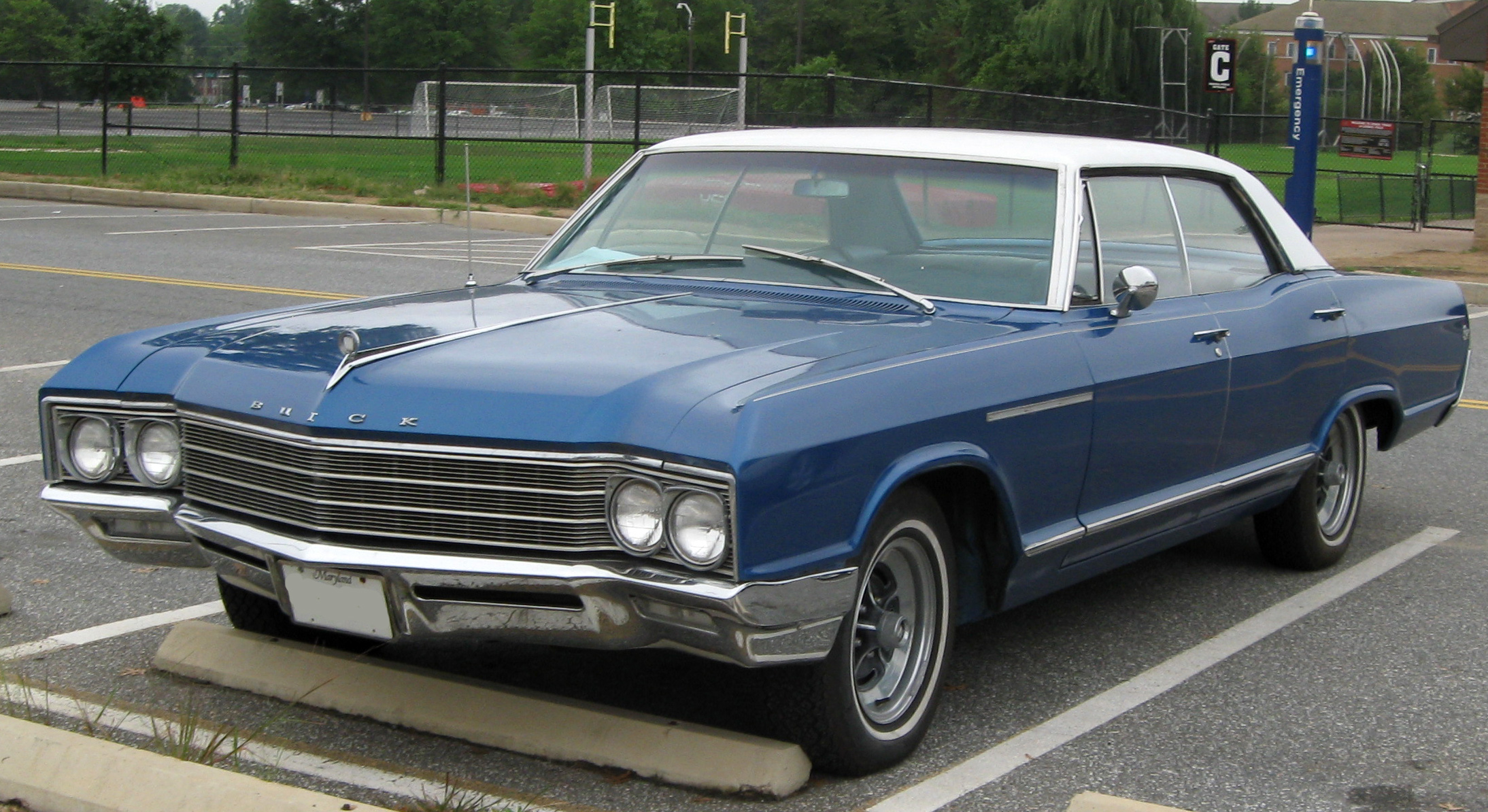
1966 Buick LeSabre 4-door Hardtop

New grilles and four-segmented taillights highlighted the facelifted 1966 LeSabre models. Also new was a revised instrument panel with a horizontal sweep speedometer replacing the round pod instruments and new interior door handles. Both base and Custom level series were continued. New standard safety features included a padded instrument panel, outside driver-side rear view mirror and backup lights. Under the hood, the 300-cubic-inch V8 was replaced by a larger 340-cubic-inch V8 rated at 220 horsepower with two-barrel carburetor and available with either a standard three-speed manual transmission or optional two-speed automatic, but the four-speed manual was dropped from the option list. Ordering the LeSabre 400 option upgraded the buyer to a 260-horsepower 340 with four-barrel carburetor and higher 10.25 to 1 compression ratio along with the three-speed Super Turbine 400 automatic found in the larger engine Wildcat, Electra 225 and Riviera.

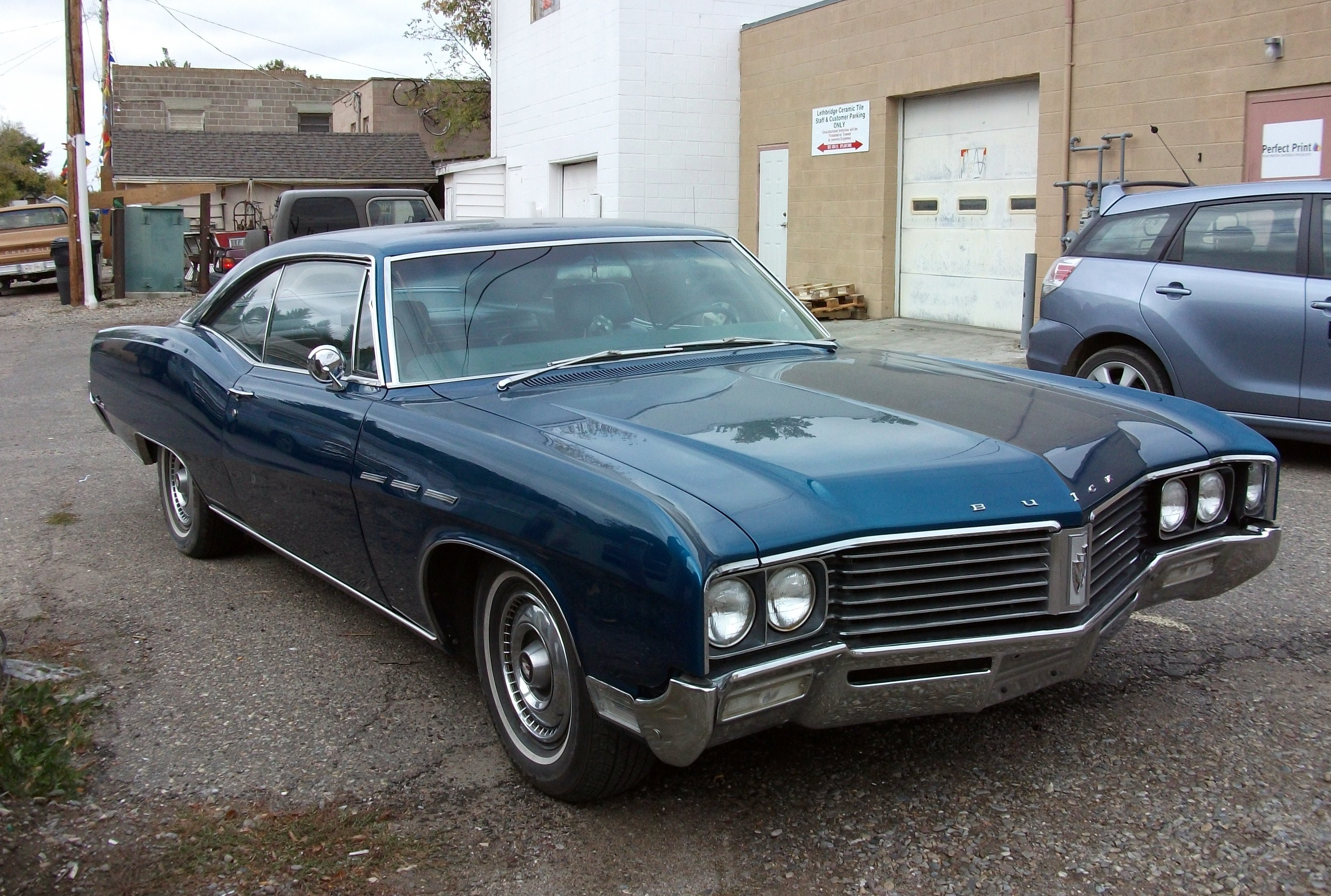
1967 Buick LeSabre Sport Coupe

Somewhat more rounded sheet metal and a swoopier fastback roofline for the two-door hardtop highlighted the 1967 LeSabre but chassis and inner body were unchanged along with drivetrains. Both base and Custom-level LeSabres were continued. New options for 1967 included front disc brakes and a stereo 8-track tape player. The standard drum brakes were upgraded with more cooling fins and a dual-master cylinder system was introduced. Engine and transmission offerings were unchanged from 1966.

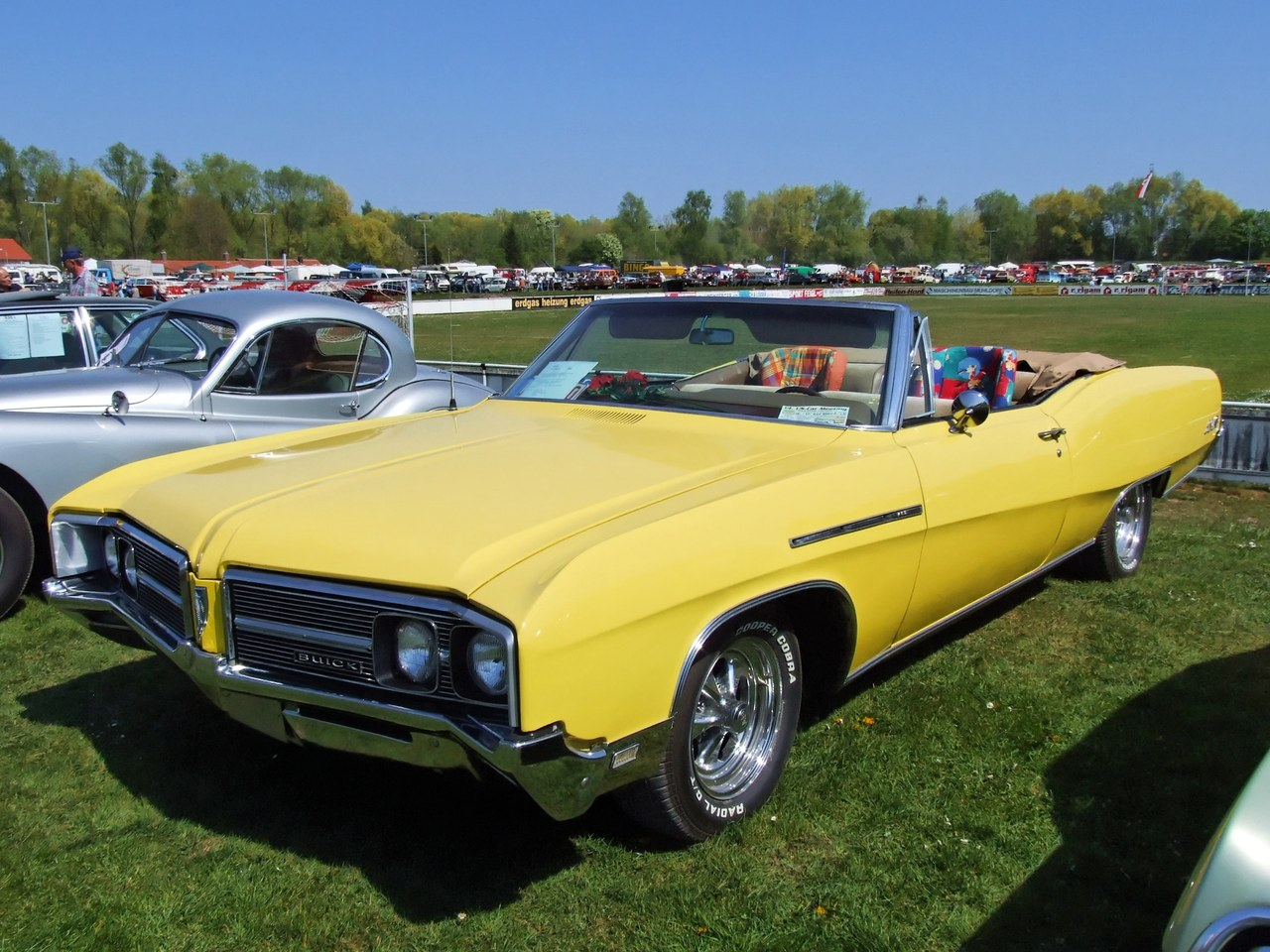
1968 Buick LeSabre Custom Convertible

The 1968 LeSabre received a minor facelift including new grilles and taillights along with concealed windshield wipers. Inside was a revised instrument panel with square speedometer surrounded by other instruments with minor trim revisions for both base and Custom models. A new 350-cubic-inch V8 replaced the previous 340. In standard form the 350 V8 delivered 230 horsepower with two-barrel carburetor and 9 to 1 compression ratio and came with a standard three-speed manual transmission or optional two-speed Super Turbine 300 automatic. The "LeSabre 400" option package included a 280-horsepower 350 four-barrel V8 with 10.25 to 1 compression and three-speed Super Turbine 400 automatic transmission. The "Switch-Pitch" torque converter used in conjunction with the Super Turbine automatic transmission was discontinued in favor of a standard torque converter.

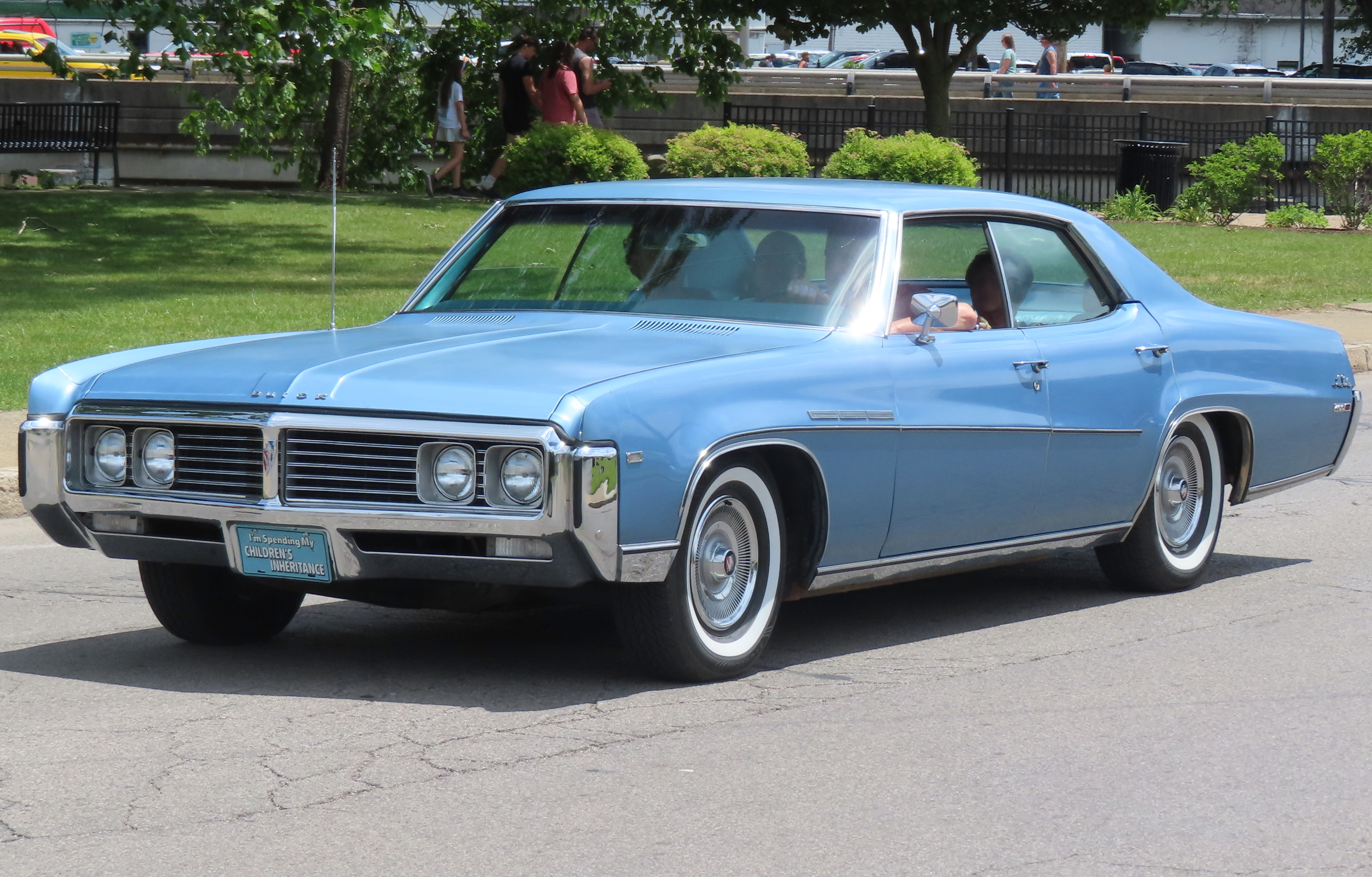
1969 Buick LeSabre Custom 4-door hardtop

The 1969 LeSabre received new sheetmetal with more squared off styling than the 1965-68 models including a formal roofline on coupes replacing the semi-fastback of previous years. Though the 1969 model was extensively restyled with new sheetmetal, the basic 1965 chassis and inner body structure were retained, along with the roofline of the four-door pillared sedans though vent windows were dropped on all models. Wheelbase remained at 123 inches (3,100 mm). Interiors were mildly revised with minor changes to the instrument panel including the movement of the heating/air conditioning controls to the left of the steering wheel, which was new this year. Headrests, previously optional, were now standard equipment due to a federal safety mandate. The 1969 LeSabre and other Buicks also received a new steering column mounted ignition switch (relocated from the instrument panel) that also locked the steering wheel when the transmission was in Park. The ignition/locking steering column appeared on all 1969 General Motors cars one year ahead of the federal mandate requiring all cars to be so equipped. Also new was a variable-ratio power steering unit along with revised front suspension geometry for improved ride and handling under Buick's tradename of Accu-Drive. Steel rails were also built into the doors (and rear quarter panels on coupes and convertibles) for improved side impact protection as was the case with all 1969 GM B- and C-body cars. Powertrains were unchanged from 1968 with the 230-horsepower 350 two-barrel V8 standard and available with a three-speed manual transmission or the two-speed Super Turbine 300 automatic while the LeSabre "400" package once again included a 280-horsepower 350 four-barrel engine and three-speed Super Turbine 400 automatic.

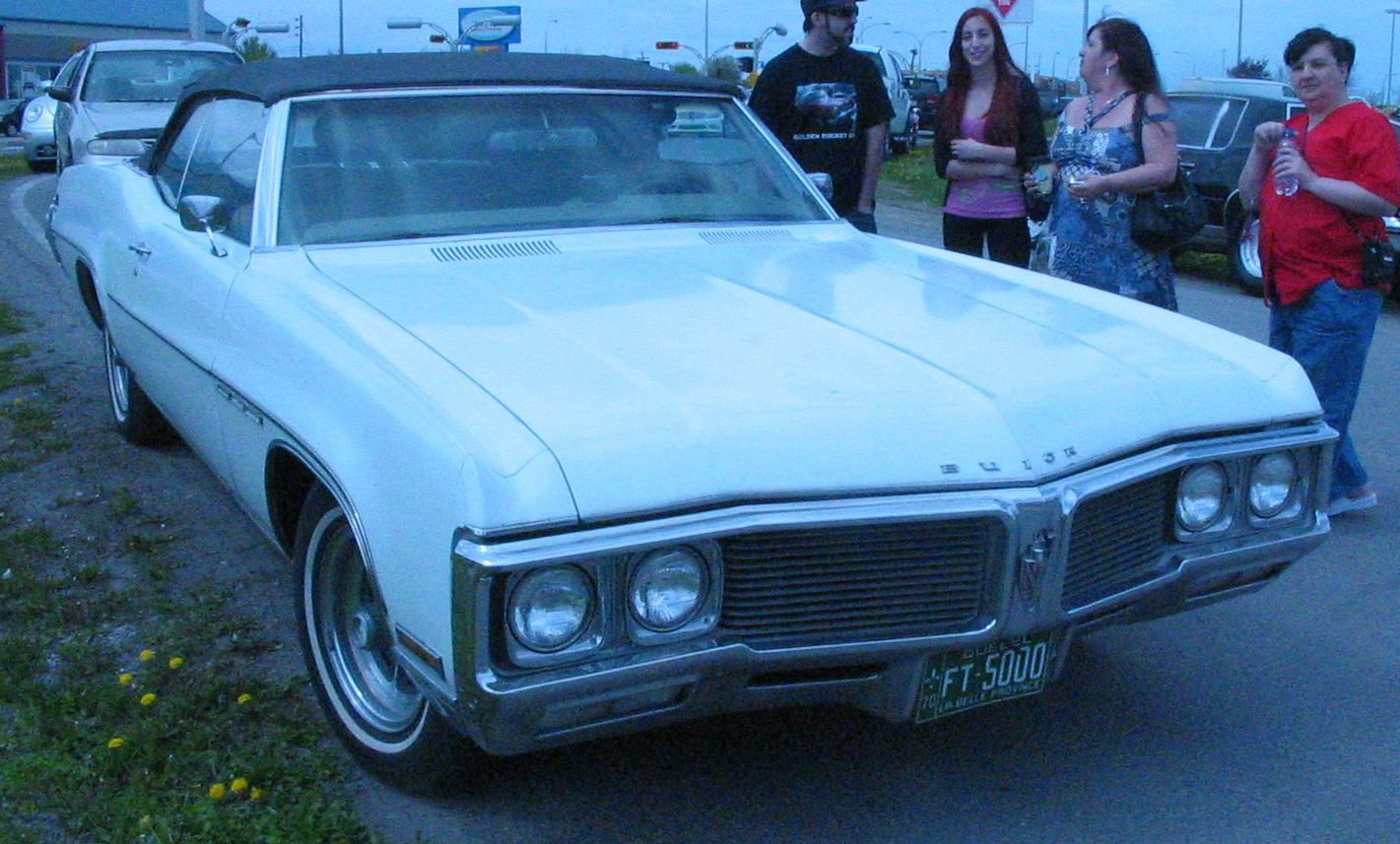
1970 Buick LeSabre Convertible

Only minor detail changes including grille and taillight revisions were made to the 1970 LeSabre. New features this year included a hidden radio antenna which amounted to two wires embedded in the windshield. Wheelbase was increased by one inch to 124 inches (3,100 mm), matching direct competitors such as Oldsmobile Delta 88, Mercury Monterey and Chrysler Newport. Both base and Custom models were again offered. Engines were revised with the standard 350 two-barrel V8 increased in horsepower from 230 to 260. A new option for 1970 was a low-compression regular-fuel version of the 350 four-barrel rated at 285 horsepower and the high-compression premium fuel 350 four-barrel V8 was reworked with horsepower upped to 315 on a 10.25 to 1 compression ratio. Added to the lineup was a new LeSabre 455 line which shared interior and exterior trimmings with the LeSabre Custom and was powered by Buick's new 455 cubic-inch V8 with four-barrel carburetor, 10.25 to 1 compression and 370 horsepower, which also required premium fuel. Transmission offerings included a standard three-speed manual with column shift for the base 350 two-barrel or optional three-speed Turbo Hydra-matic 350 automatic, which was standard equipment with the two 350 four-barrel engines. This transmission completely replaced the old two-speed automatic offered with the smaller base engines in past years, while the 455 was paired with the Turbo Hydra-matic 400. Buick now joined other GM divisions in marketing the automatic transmission under the Turbo Hydra-matic trade name rather than the "Super Turbine" designation used since 1964. At the start of the model year, variable-ratio power steering and power drum brakes were optional equipment. Those items were made standard equipment on all LeSabres (and Wildcats) effective January 1, 1970. Power front disc brakes remained an extra-cost option. For the first time since 1964, Buick offered a full-sized station wagon for 1970 under the Estate Wagon nameplate. Though it used the LeSabre's B-body, it rode on the C-body Electra 225's 127-inch (3,200 mm) wheelbase chassis. The Estate Wagon came standard with the 455 V8 and interior trims were similar to the LeSabre Custom and Wildcat. The 1965-70 GM B platform is the fourth best selling automobile platform in history after the Volkswagen Beetle, Ford Model T and the Lada Riva.

== Fourth generation (1971–1976) ==
Fourth generation
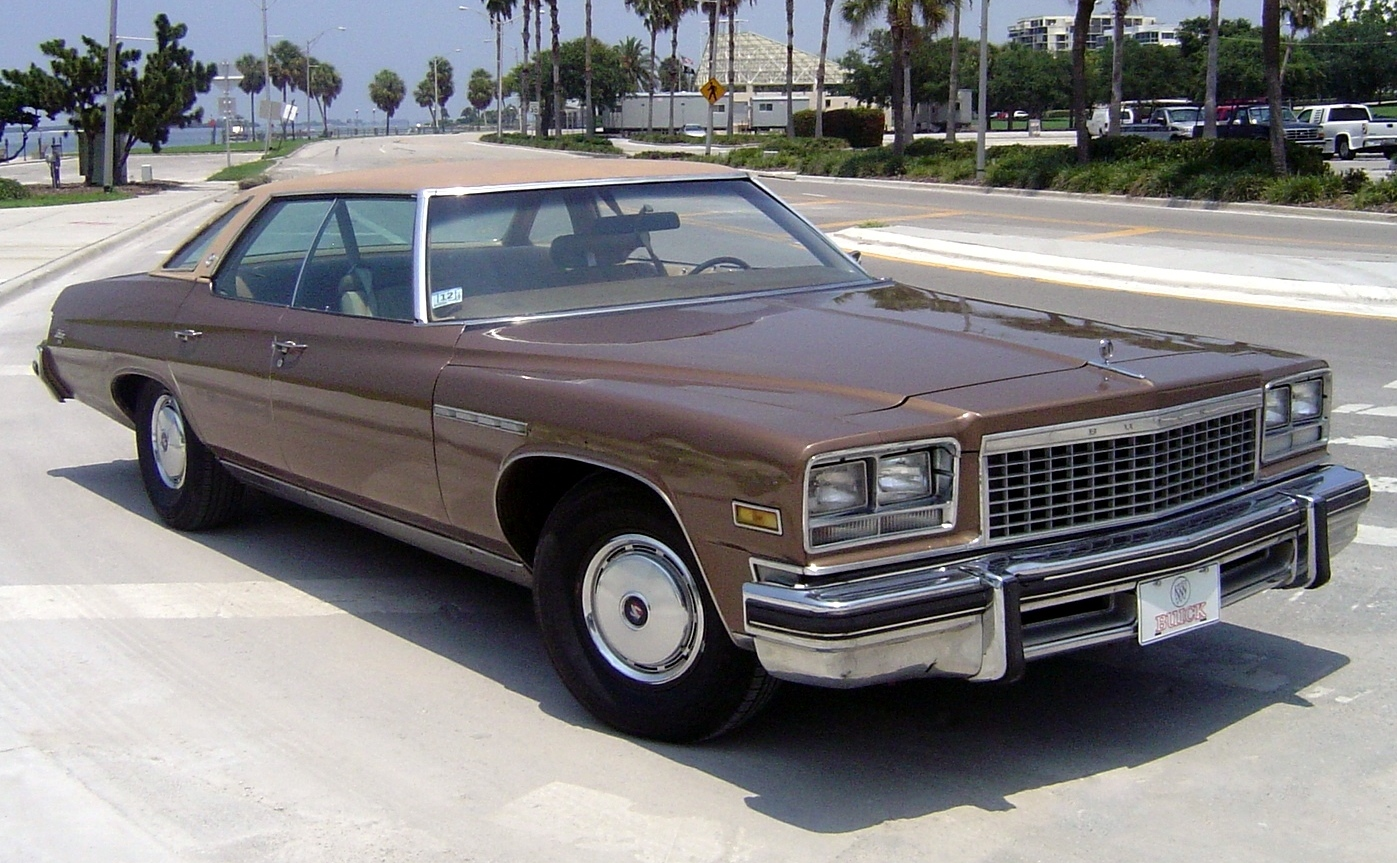
- 1976 LeSabre Custom hardtop sedan

Overview
- Model years: 1971–1976
- Assembly: (main plant); Flint, Michigan, USA (Buick City) (branch assembly); Kansas City, Kansas, USA (Fairfax Assembly); South Gate, California, USA (South Gate Assembly); Wilmington, Delaware, USA (Wilmington Assembly)

Body and chassis
- Body style: 2-door convertible 2-door hardtop 4-door sedan 4-door hardtop
- Layout: FR layout
- Platform: B-body
- Related: Chevrolet Bel Air; Chevrolet Impala; Chevrolet Caprice; Pontiac Parisienne; Pontiac Catalina/Laurentian; Pontiac Bonneville; Pontiac Grand Ville; Oldsmobile 88; Buick Centurion

Powertrain
- Engine: 231 cu in (3.8 L) Buick V6; 350 cu in (5.7 L) Buick V8; 455 cu in (7.5 L) Buick V8
- Transmission: 3-speed automatic

Dimensions
- Wheelbase: 124 in (3,149.6 mm)
- Length: 221.9 in (5,636.3 mm)

Like the other GM divisions, Buick completely restyled its B- and C-body cars for 1971. The full-size cars emerged larger and heavier than before and also ever after. The styling featured curved bodysides, long hoods and wide expanses of glass, similar to that of Chrysler Corporation's 1969 full-sized cars, but with a lower beltline than the Chrysler products. Semi-fastback rooflines were utilized on two-door hardtop coupes and convertibles had a new top design to permit a full-width rear seat.

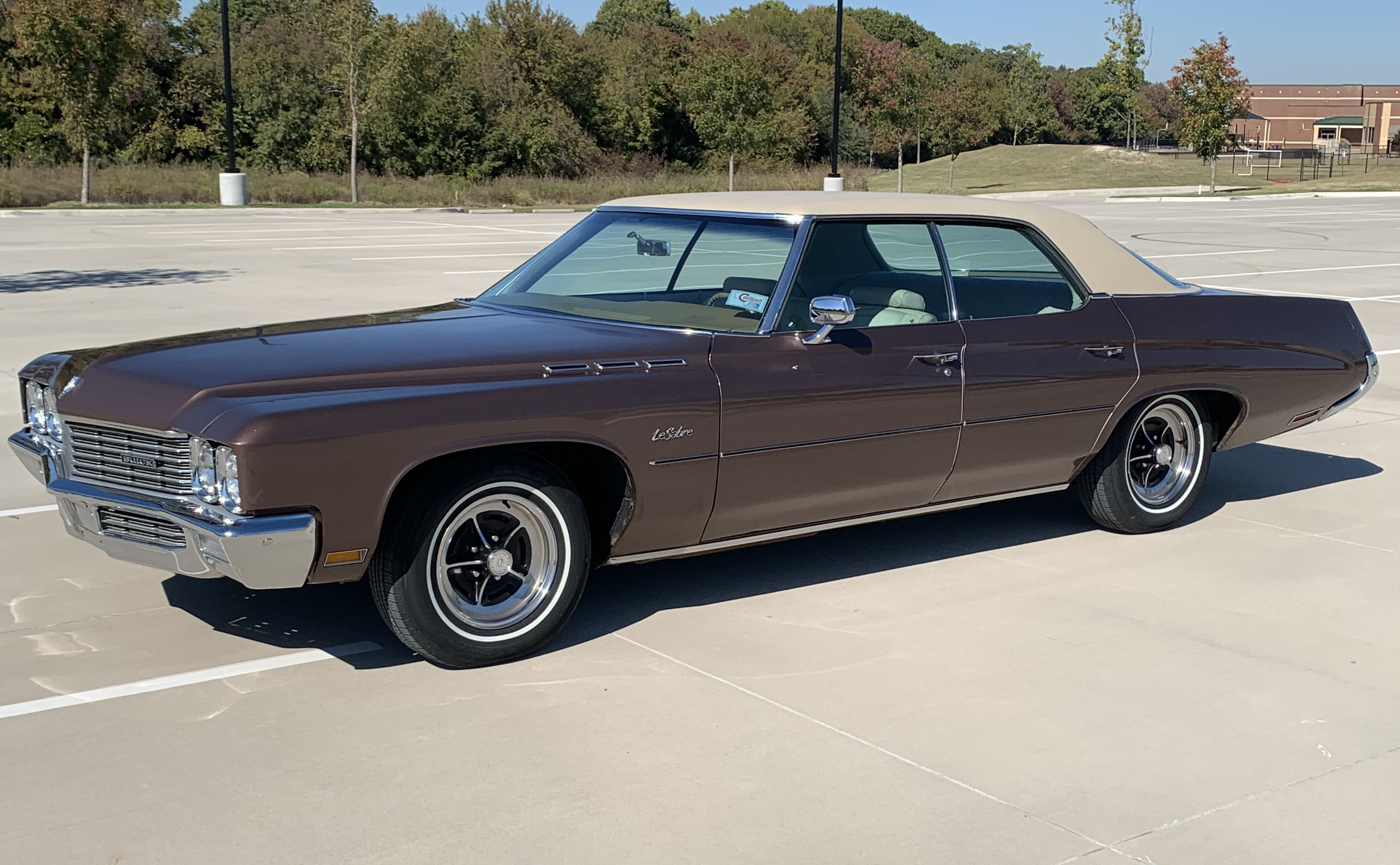
1971 Buick LeSabre hardtop sedan

The same assortment of 350 and 455 cubic-inch V8s were carried over but featured lowered compression ratios and other modifications in order to enable the use of lower-octane low-lead or unleaded gasoline as a result of a General Motors corporate mandate. Variable-ratio power steering and power front disc brakes were made standard equipment on all LeSabres at the start of the 1971 model year. In March, the Turbo Hydramatic transmission became standard equipment, and all Buick LeSabres would remain so equipped in base form until the nameplate's final year in 2005. The new body also featured a double shell roof for improved roll-over protection. Also new for '71 was a flow-through ventilation system utilizing vents mounted in the trunklid shared with other full-sized GM cars and the compact Chevrolet Vega. It used the heater fan to draw air into the car from the cowl intake, and force it out through vents in the trunk lid or tailgate. In theory, passengers could enjoy fresh air even when the car was moving slowly or stopped, as in heavy traffic. In practice, however, it didn't work. However, within weeks of the 1971 models' debut, Buick and all other GM dealers received multiple complaints from drivers who complained that the ventilation system pulled cold air into the car before the heater could warm up and could not be turned off. The ventilation system was extensively modified for 1972. Also new for the 1971 was an optional MaxTrac computerized traction control system. Inside was a new wrap-around cockpit style instrument panel that placed all controls and instruments within easy reach of the driver, along with easier serviceability with instruments and switches accessible from the front when the faceplate was removed. The seats of a new full-foam design with headrests more squared off than 1969–70. Again, base and Custom model LeSabres were offered in the same sedan and coupe bodystyles while the convertible was a Custom-only offering. The LeSabre 455 model line was dropped for 1971 with the larger engine now being offered as an option on the regular base and Custom-series models. LeSabre Customs equipped with the optional 455 engine got a "455" badge underneath the LeSabre nameplates on the front fenders instead of the "Custom" badge normally used.

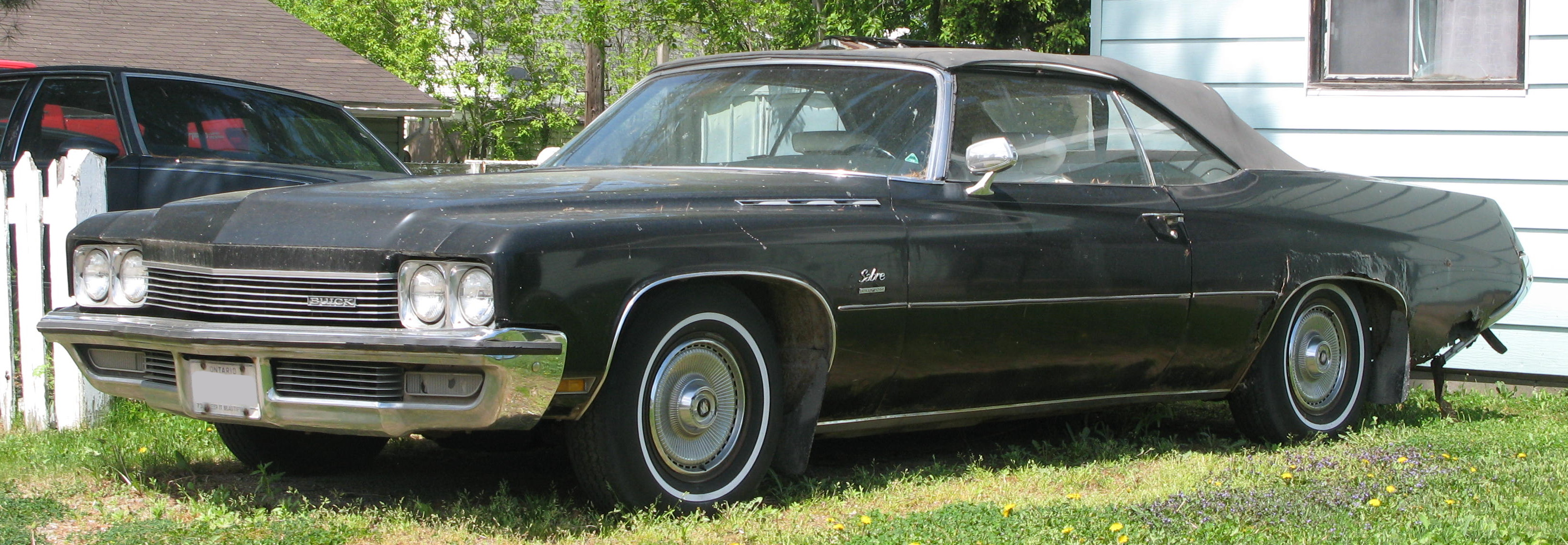
1972 Buick LeSabre Custom Convertible

A revised grille and taillights lenses were among the styling changes for 1972. Out back, a small "BUICK" nameplate was located above the right-side taillight, replacing the larger block letters spelling "B U I C K" across the lower trunk lid between the taillights in 1971. Also new for '72 was a one-year only 2 1/2-mph front bumper. All B, C, and E body (large) GM cars received such a bumper for 1972. Interior trims received only slight revisions from 1971. A revised flow-through ventilation system utilizing vents in the doorjambs replaced the troublesome system used in 1971 with the trunklid vents. Both the 350 and 455 V8s were carried over from 1971 with horsepower ratings switched the new SAE net figures based on an engine as installed in an automobile with accessories and emission controls hooked up, rather than the gross horsepower method of past years based upon a dynamometer rating from an engine not installed in a vehicle. With that, the standard 350 two-barrel V8 was rated at 160 net horsepower compared to 230 gross horsepower in 1971 while the top 455 V8 was rated at 250 net horsepower in 1972 compared to 315 in 1971. Engines were also revised to meet the 1972 federal and California emission standards with California-bound cars receiving EGR valves, which would be installed on engines of virtually all automobiles for nationwide sales in 1973. Inside, the instrument panel featured a new "FASTEN SEAT BELTS" light due to a new federal safety regulation and the buzzer which sounded when the key was left in the ignition also sounded upon starting the car to remind the driver and passengers to buckle up.

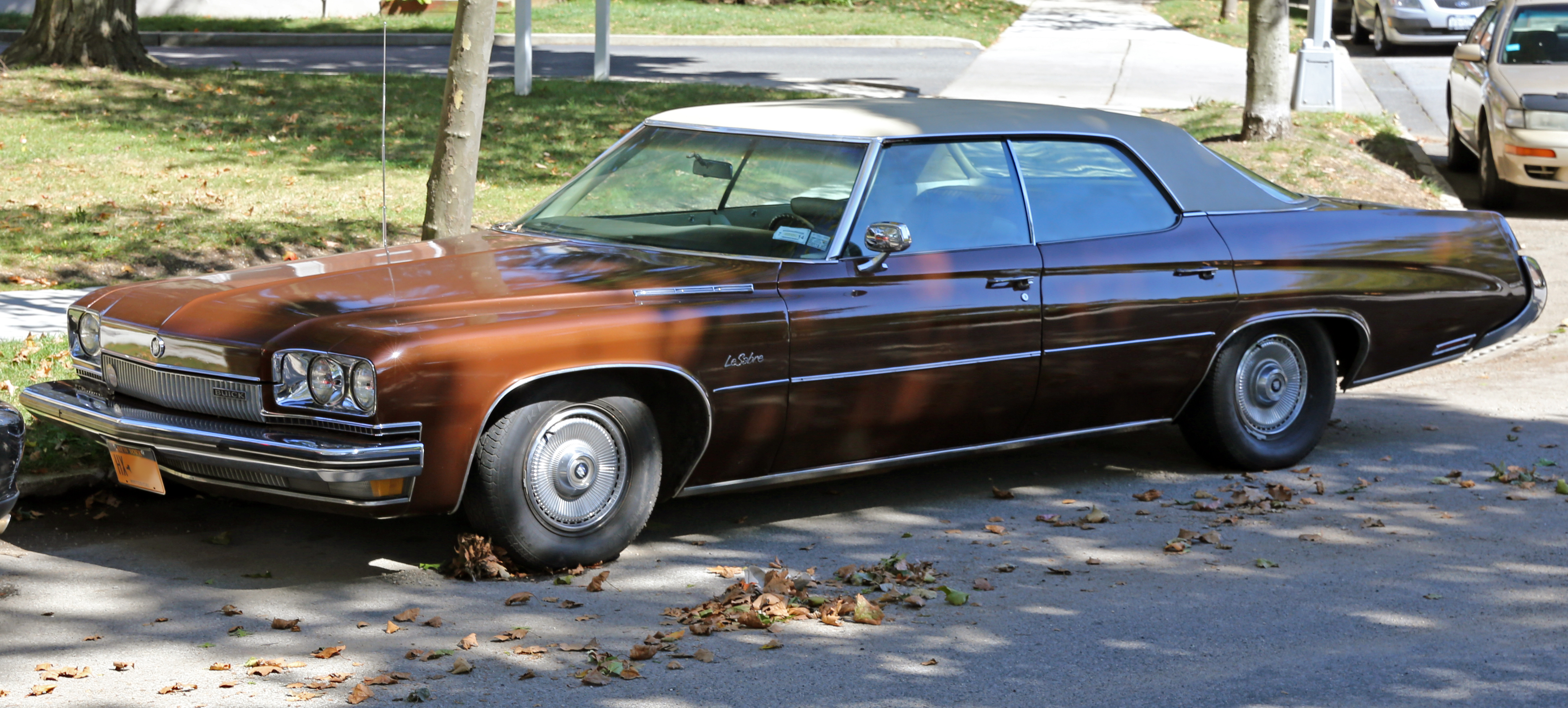
1973 LeSabre hardtop sedan, showing the new bigger 5 mph bumpers

The 1973 Buick LeSabre featured the larger federally mandated "5 mph" front bumper and a new vertical bar grille flowed across the entire lower front end and under the headlights, and turn signal below the bumper. Revised taillights were set in a larger rear bumper. Both the 350 and 455 V8s were revised with EGR valves used on both federal and California-emission equipped cars. The LeSabre Custom convertible was dropped this year leaving the short-lived Centurion as Buick's only ragtop that year as the intermediate Skylark (replaced by the Century for 1973) lost its ragtop completely after the 1972 model year. The engine options continued largely unchanged.

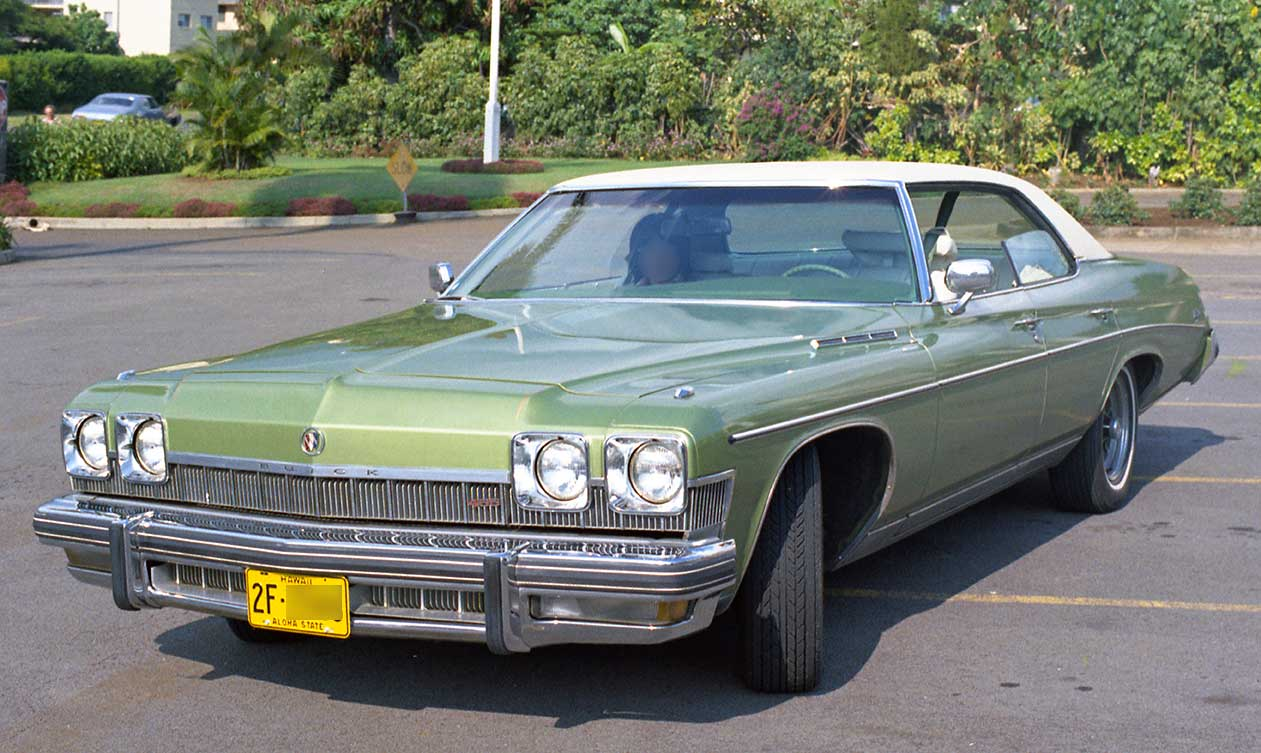
1974 Buick LeSabre Luxus 4-door hardtop sedan.

The 1974 Buick LeSabre appeared to have a stronger, more modern appearance with a more detailed vertical-barred grille, dual headlights were given individual bezels, turn signals were set within the front bumper and wide horizontal taillights stretched above the new 5 mph rear bumper. Four-door pillared and hardtop sedans retained the same rooflines as 1973 but the two-door hardtop coupe featured a new roofline with a side rear opera windows (along with a small roll-down rear window). Inside, the instrument panel was substantially revised but retained the wrap-around theme. A new (and seldom ordered) option was an "Air Cushion Restraint System" which included driver- and passenger-side airbags along with a unique four-spoke steering wheel. This option, also available on Electra 225s and Rivieras as well as full-sized Oldsmobiles and Cadillacs, was not very popular and was dropped after the 1976 model year. New integrated seat and shoulder belts were introduced this year along with a federally mandated interlock system that required the driver and right front passenger to buckle their seat belts in order to start the vehicle. The interlock was met with such a major public outcry that Congress rescinded the interlock regulation in late 1974 after a few early 1975 models were so equipped, permitting owners of all 1974 and the early 1975 models equipped with the interlock system to legally disconnect it. With the Centurion line discontinued after 1973, LeSabre was now Buick's only B-body full-sized car. The base LeSabre was continued, but a new LeSabre Luxus series replaced both the LeSabre Custom and the Centurion. The Luxus convertible also returned the ragtop to the LeSabre line after a one-year absence and was Buick's only ragtop. Engine offerings were revised for 1974. The 350 two-barrel remained standard on all models with optional engines including a 350 four-barrel and 455 four-barrel V8s, both carried over from 1973 with revisions to meet the 1974 emission standards. New engine options for 1974 included a 455 two-barrel and the Stage 1 455 "performance package" which added dual exhausts, suspension upgrades and other equipment. New options for 1974 included radial-ply tires, GM's High Energy Ignition and a "low fuel" warning light that illuminated when the fuel tank was down to four gallons. This would be the final year for the MaxTrac electronic traction control system as an option.

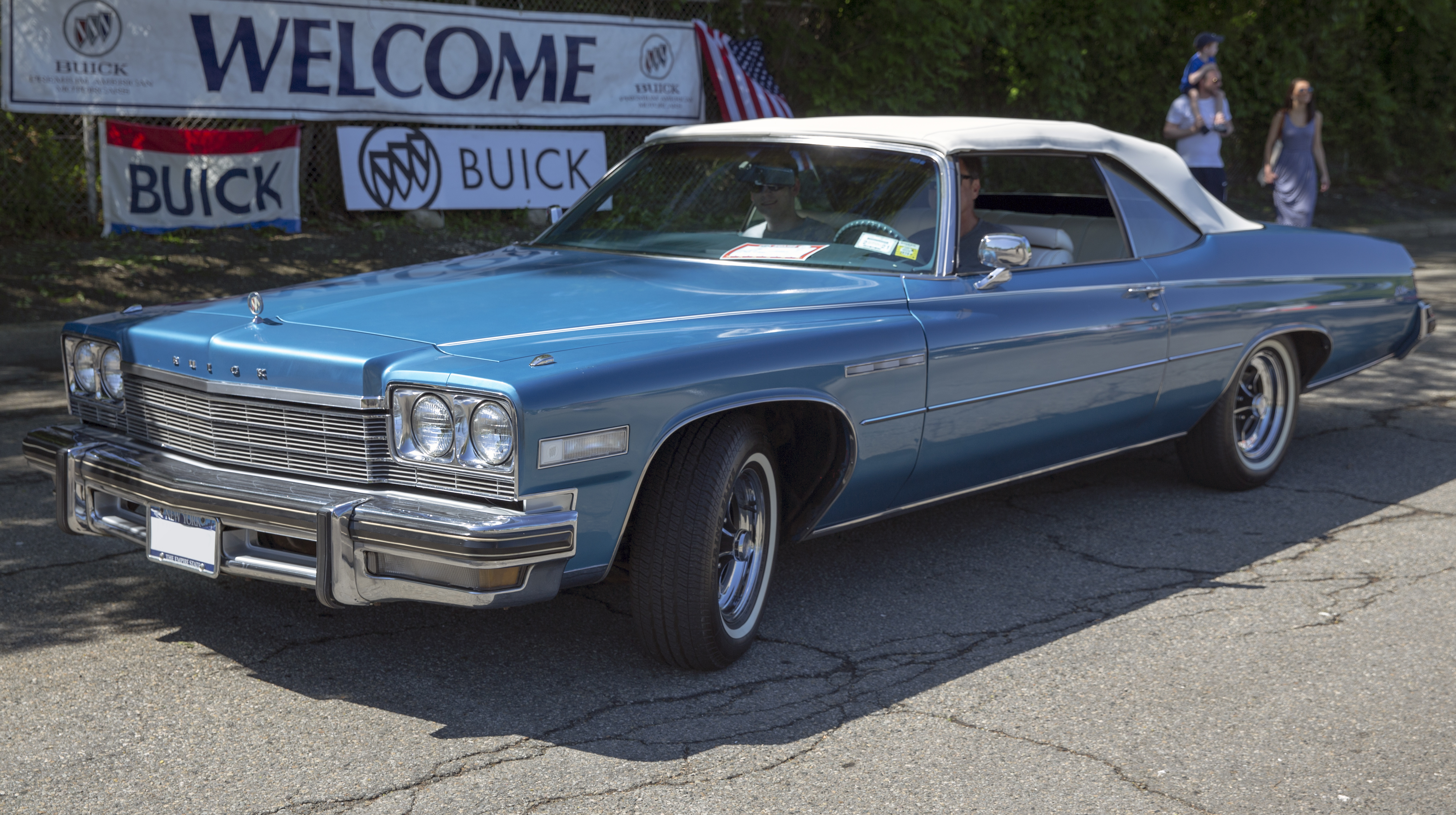
1975 Buick LeSabre Custom Convertible

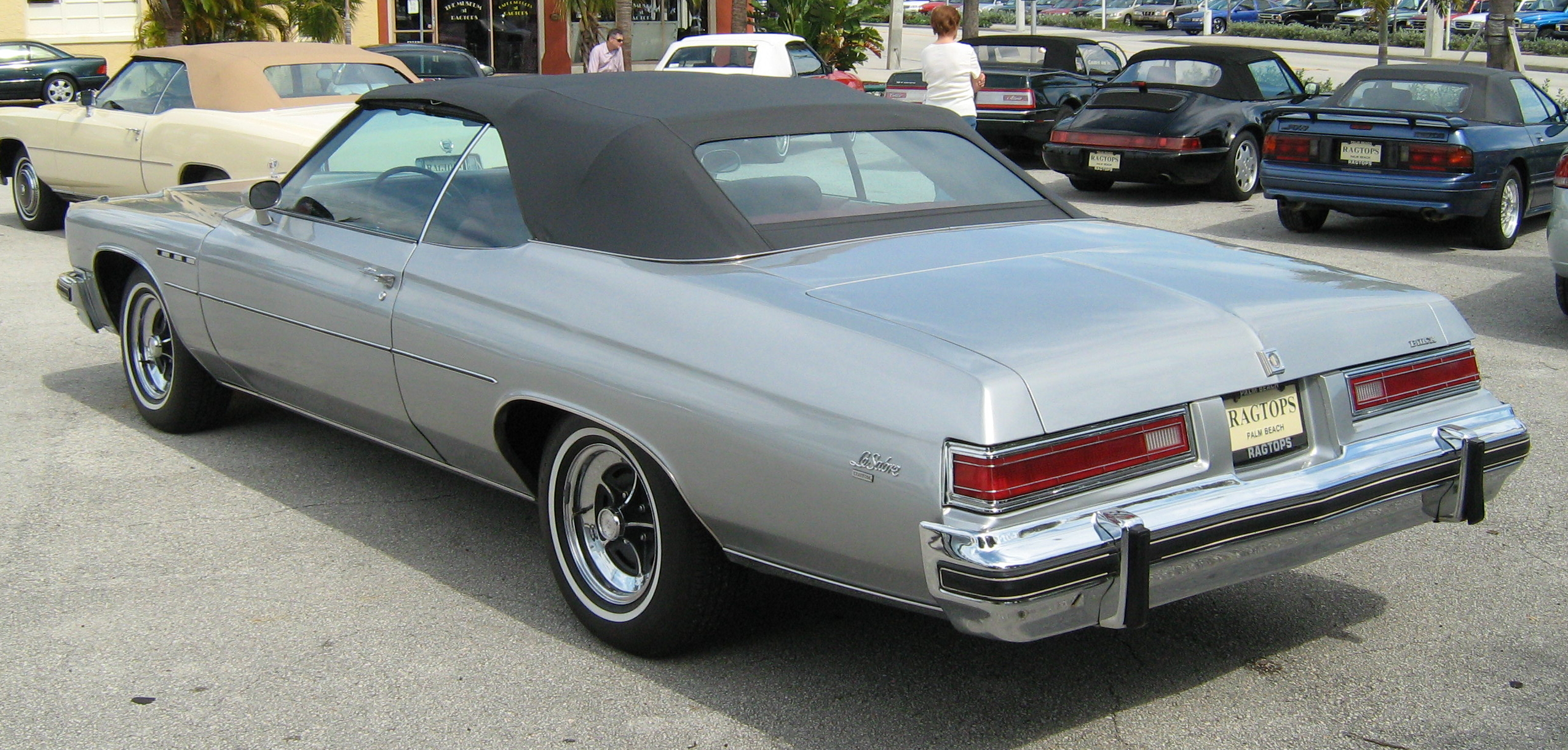
1975 Buick LeSabre Custom Convertible

The upscale LeSabre Luxus designation was dropped and replaced by the LeSabre Custom nameplate. 1975 also was the first year of the catalytic converter, and standard high energy ignition which was part of GM's Maximum Mileage System at the time Introduced in September 1974. The 1975 LeSabre was the first to require use of unleaded gasoline, due to the advent of the catalytic converter. The LeSabre lineup offered a coupe and two sedans while the LeSabre Custom lineup offered the coupe, two sedans, and the only convertible in the Buick lineup. 1975 would be the final year for the LeSabre Custom Convertible with around 5,300 examples rolling off the assembly lines. Engine offerings were reduced to just two: the standard 5.7-litre V8 (350 CID) and a four-barrel carburetor or optional 7.5-litre V8 (455 CID) with a four barrel. The 1975 Buick LeSabre now featured a larger, cross-hatched patterned grille which still ran the entire front of the car, dual headlights were once again set side by side instead of individually. Turn signals were located within the front bumper. A Buick tri-shield hood ornament was standard on the Custom Series and optional on the base series. The three-hole 'ventiports' were moved from the hood to the front fenders. Slightly larger but narrower taillamps draped the back of the car with back-up lights positioned in the center broken up by the license plate. Four-door pillared sedans received a new small third windows to emulate the six-window "Colonnade" styling of GM intermediates while four-door hardtop sedans had new opera windows. Inside, a new flat instrument panel shared with Electra and Riviera replaced the wrap-around cockpit dash of previous years and featured a horizontal sweep speedometer that read to only 100 mph compared to 120 mph in previous years and also included kilometer readings. Otherwise, interior trimmings received only minor revisions. Convertible production for both the LeSabre Custom and the Centurion convertibles were not very abundant in the years 1971 to 1975. The rarest production in that time was the 1971 LeSabre Custom with just over 1,800 units built, and the most produced was the 1973 Centurion with slightly over 5,700 units built. Due to this very low production volume and the end of the full-size convertible era, this may make this series of ragtop LeSabre Custom and Centurion Convertibles quite collectable - depending on the vehicles' overall condition. The convertible mechanism used was called the 'scissor top' that folded inward on itself, instead of straight back. This was featured on all GM full-size convertibles from 1971 to 1976.

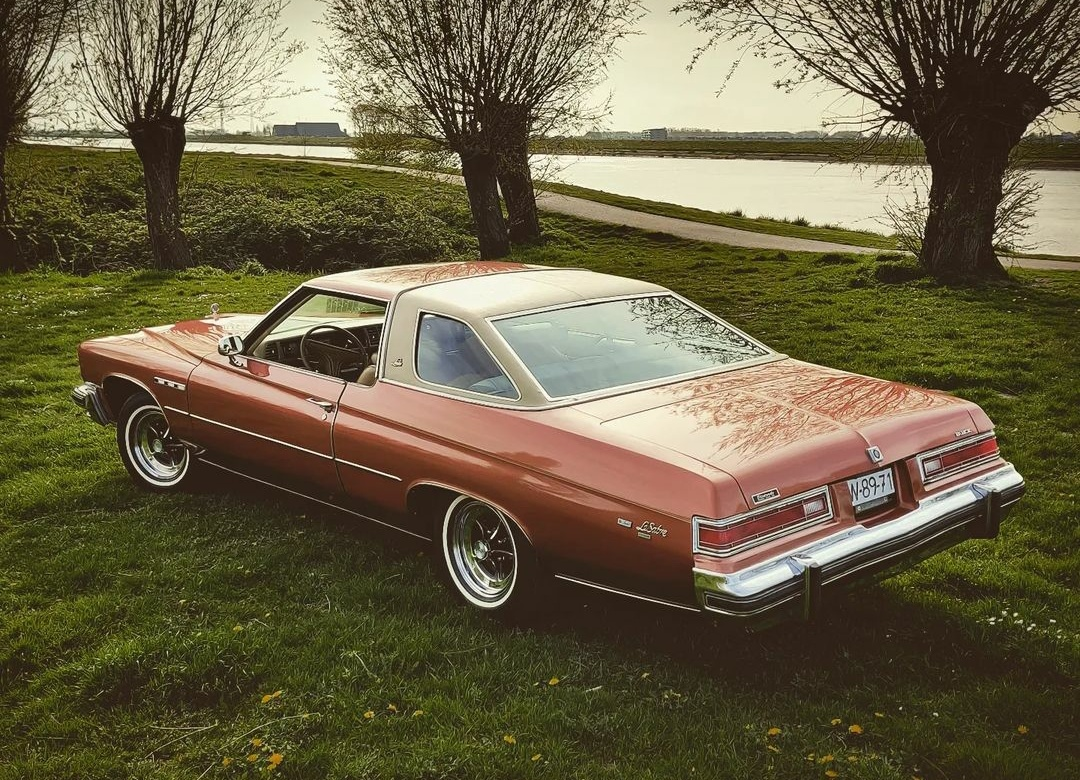
1975 Buick LeSabre Custom hardtop coupe rear

Only minor styling changes highlighted the 1976 Buick LeSabre, which was the final year for the 1971-vintage bodyshell, the unpopular and rarely-ordered driver and passenger-side airbag option, the 455 V8 and hardtop bodystyles. Changes included rectangular quad headlights placed into a unit with the turn signals set directly below and at the center was a new classic eggcrate grille, no longer integrated with the headlights, making it more prominent. The 1976 LeSabre was the only American full-size car with a standard V6 engine, which was Buick's brand-new 3.8-litre (231 CID) V6 engine. The V6 was only offered on the base-level LeSabre and not mentioned in initial 1976 Buick literature issued in September 1975 because the V6 engine was a last-minute addition to the line. The 350-cubic-inch V8 was the base engine on the LeSabre Custom and the 455-cubic-inch V8 was optional. Both V8s were optional on the base LeSabre. Unlike the full size Chevrolet and other competing big coupes, Buick's full size LeSabre coupe was a true hardtop, with small rear quarter windows that rolled down (in addition to a larger third rear side "opera window" that was fixed). Pontiac and Oldsmobile also offered the hardtop coupe in their lower-priced lines. 1976 was the last year for all GM pillarless body styles.

To commemorate the Bicentennial of the United States, the standard colors available on all Buicks were Judicial Black, Liberty White, Pewter Gray, Potomac Blue, Continental Blue, Concord Green, Constitution Green, Mount Vernon Cream, Buckskin Tan, Musket Brown, Boston Red and Independence Red, with specially available colors on select models Congressional Cream, Revere Red, Colonial Yellow and Firecracker Orange.

== Fifth generation (1977–1985) ==
Fifth generation
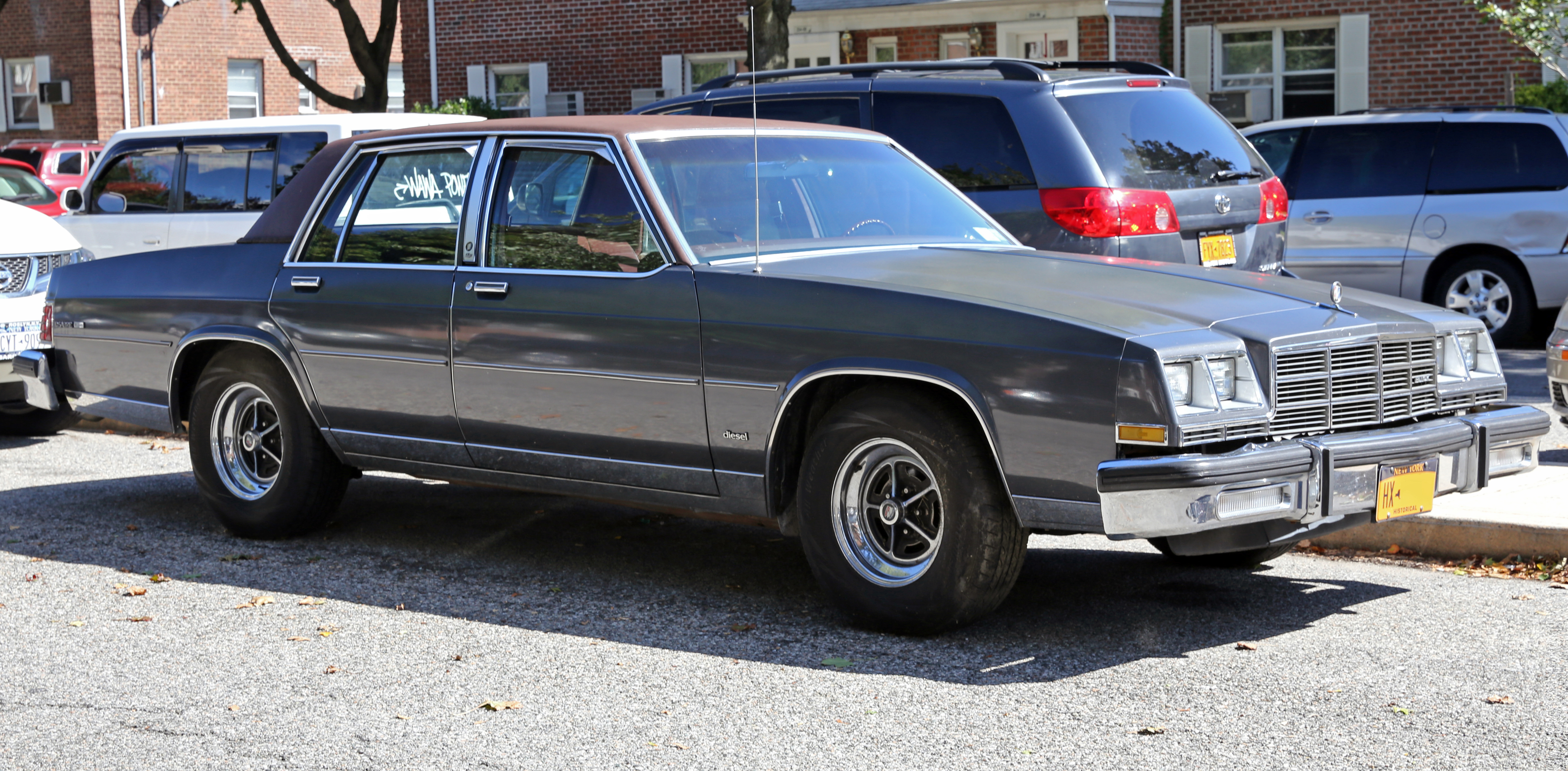
- 1982 LeSabre Limited diesel sedan

Overview
- Model years: 1977–1985
- Assembly: Flint, Michigan, USA (Buick City; 1977–1985); Kansas City, Kansas (Fairfax Assembly; 1977–1985); South Gate, California (South Gate Assembly; 1977–1978)

Body and chassis
- Body style: 2-door coupe 4-door sedan 4-door station wagon
- Layout: FR layout
- Platform: B-body
- Related: Chevrolet Caprice; Chevrolet Impala; Pontiac Bonneville; Pontiac Catalina/Laurentian; Pontiac Parisienne; Pontiac Safari; Oldsmobile Custom Cruiser; Oldsmobile 88; Buick Estate

Powertrain
- Engine: 231 cu in (3.8 L) Buick V6; 252 cu in (4.1 L) Buick V6; 301 cu in (4.9 L) Pontiac V8; 307 cu in (5.0 L) Oldsmobile V8; 350 cu in (5.7 L) Buick V8; 350 cu in (5.7 L) Oldsmobile Diesel V8; 403 cu in (6.6 L) Oldsmobile V8
- Transmission: 3-speed Turbo-Hydramatic (THM-350 or THM-400) automatic 4-speed THM200-4R automatic

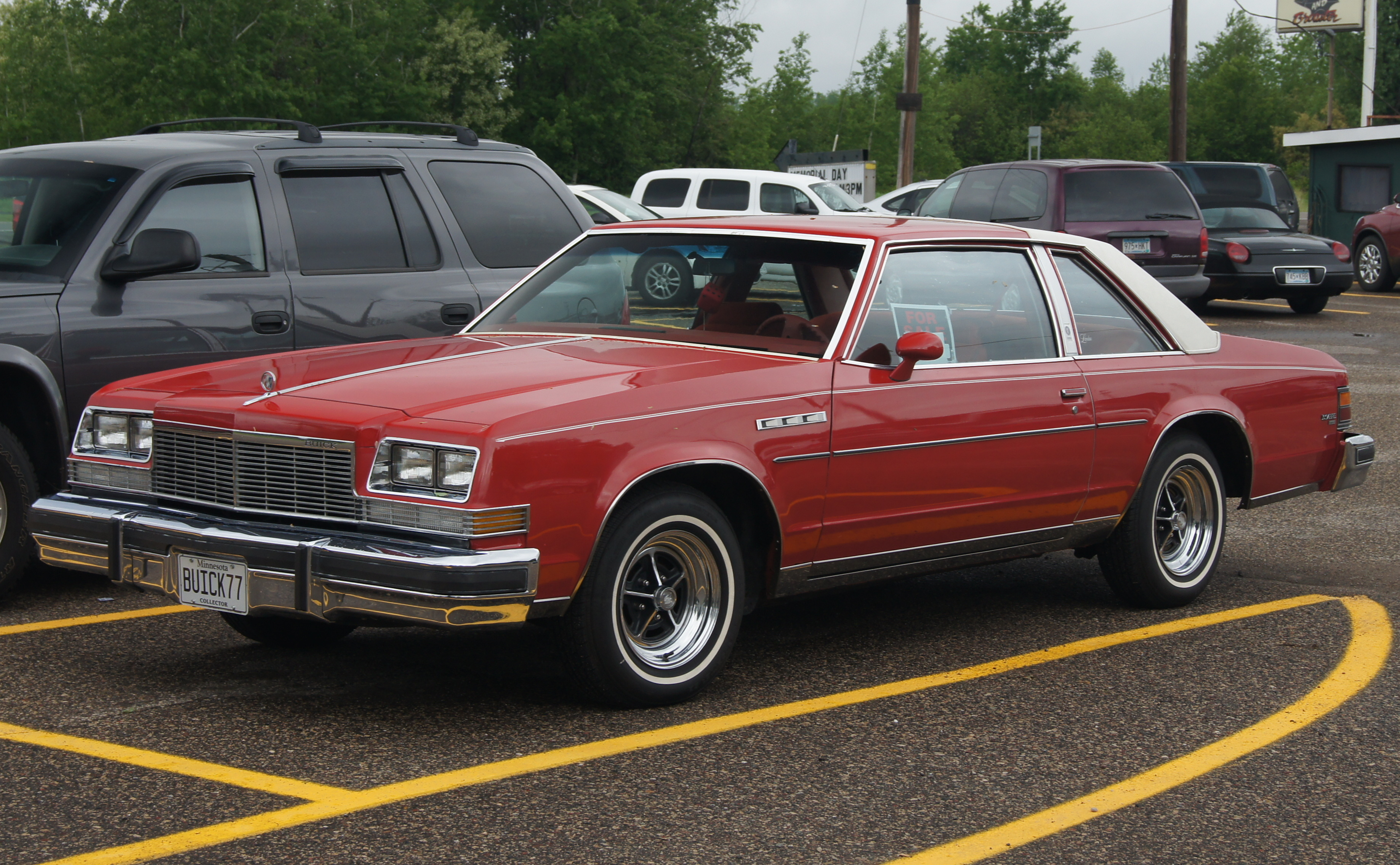
1977 Buick LeSabre Custom Landau

The 1977 Buick LeSabre and other GM B-body full-sized cars were considerably smaller on the outside and lighter than their predecessors, losing 700-800 pounds of weight and 10 to 15 inches (250 to 380 mm) of overall length. The full-sized cars were the beginning of a "corporate-wide" downsizing of vehicles in order to improve fuel economy ratings following the 1973-74 energy crisis that would filter down to intermediates in 1978, personal-luxury cars in 1979 and compacts in 1980 with subsequent downsizings of each line of vehicles scheduled in subsequent years. Although the 1977 Buick LeSabre was considerably smaller on the outside, headroom, rear seat legroom and trunk space were increased over the much larger 1976 model. The engine lineup consisted of an assortment of engines including the standard 231 cubic-inch Buick-built V6 and various optional powerplants including a Pontiac-built 301 cubic-inch V8, 350 cubic-inch V8s built by both Buick and Oldsmobile, and an Oldsmobile 403 cubic-inch V8. The V6 was standard in base and Custom coupes and sedans, the 301 V8 on the new LeSabre Sport Coupe and the 350 V8 on the Estate Wagon. The pillarless hardtop body styles were no longer available.

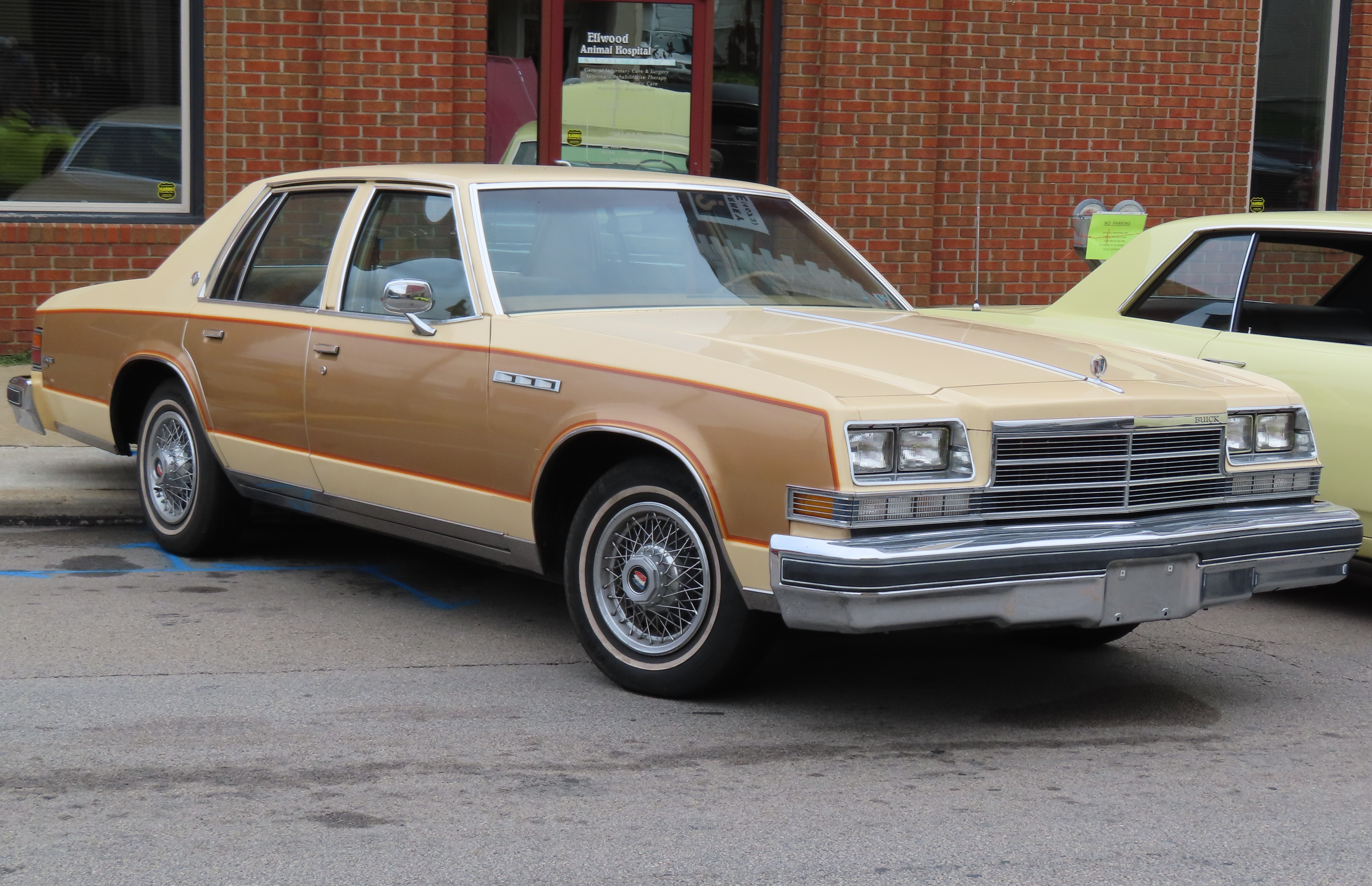
1978 Buick LeSabre Custom sedan

Following a major downsizing and redesign, the 1978 Buick LeSabre received only minor changes including new grillework. Engine offerings were unchanged from 1977 on most models, but the LeSabre Sport Coupe was now powered by a turbocharged 231 cubic-inch V6 with a four-barrel carburetor producing 165 BHP (SAE Net) at 4000 RPM and a rather useful 285 lb-ft at 2,800 rpm.

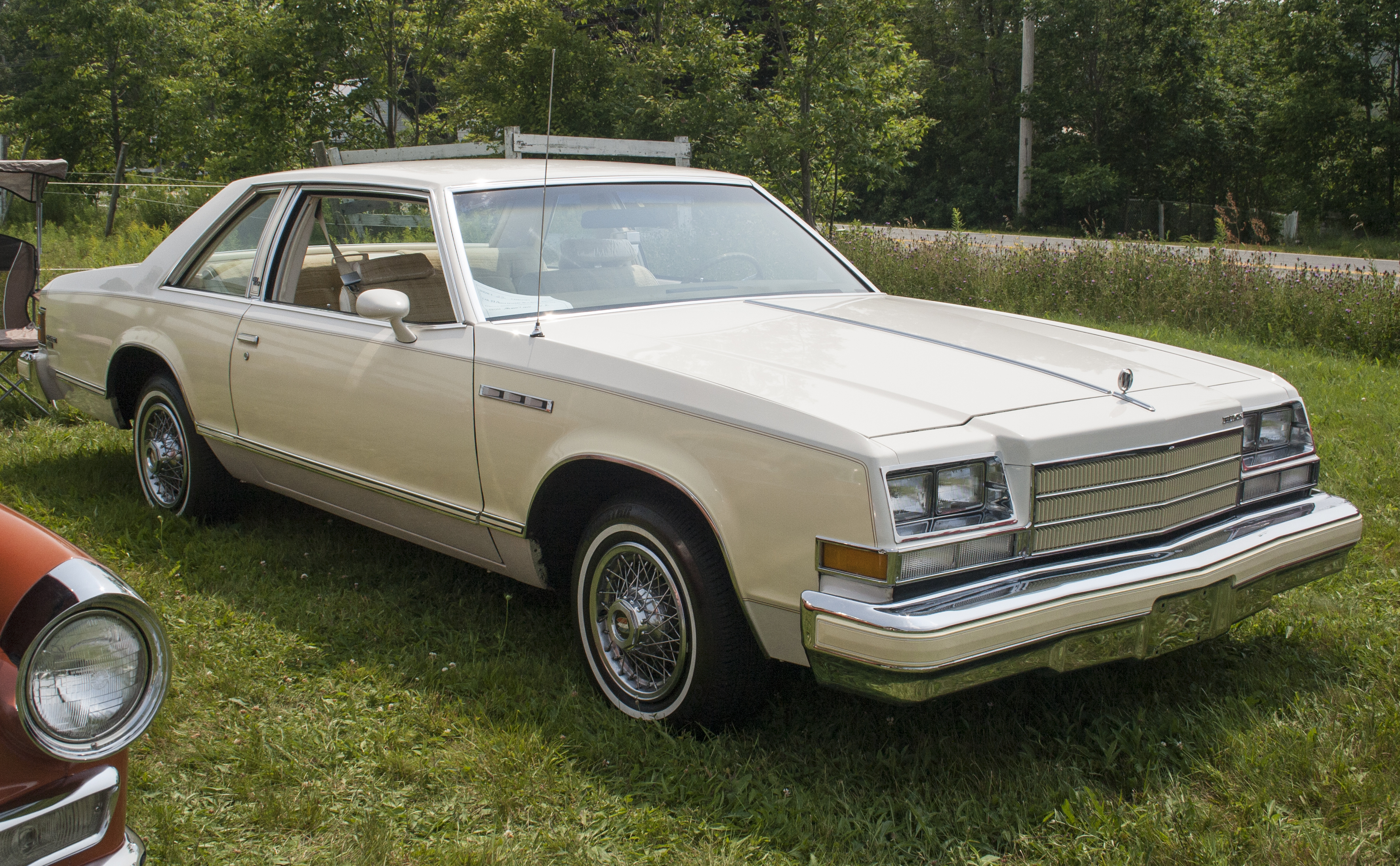
1979 Buick LeSabre "Palm Beach Edition" coupe

Only minor changes including new grille and rear taillight patterns highlighted the 1979 LeSabre aside from the top-level LeSabre Custom of previous years being renamed the LeSabre Limited. The LeSabre Sport Coupe continued with the turbocharged V6 as standard equipment and a new option for this model only were Strato bucket seats with center console. This would be the final year for the Pontiac 301 and Oldsmobile 403 V8s on the option list.

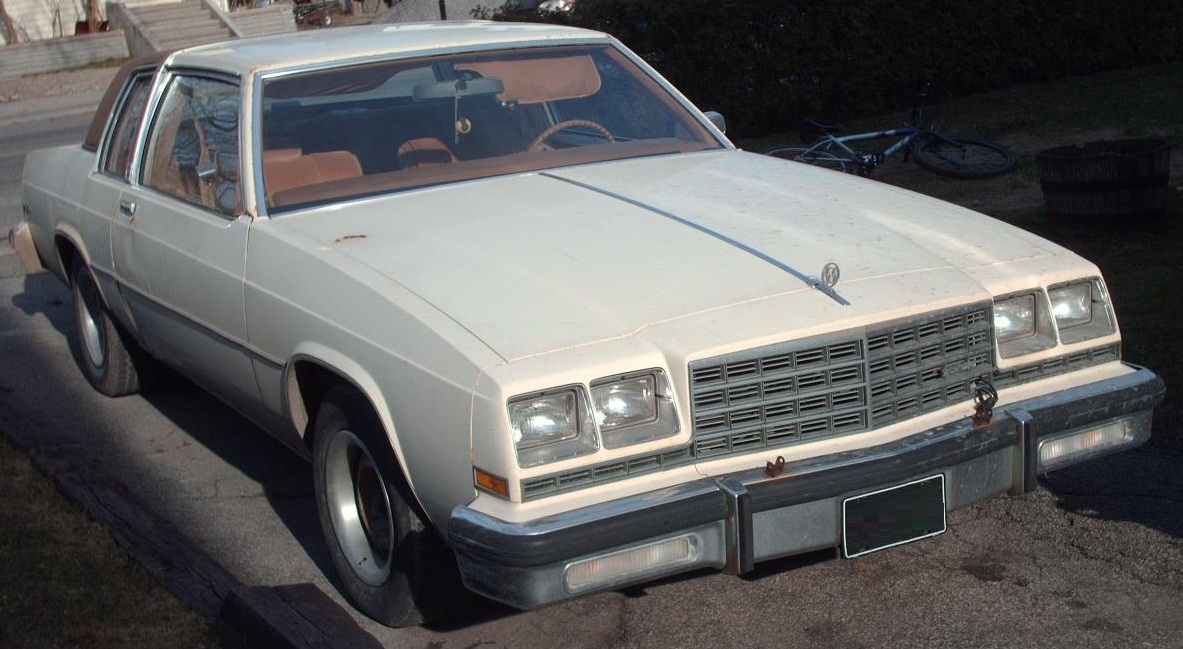
1980 Buick LeSabre coupe

New sheet metal highlighted by new swept back grilles/headlights, new taillights and revised coupe rooflines were among the changes to the 1980 Buick LeSabre aside from the complete disappearance of Buick's traditional portholes (the C-body Electra would retain them until 1984). The cars were also a bit lighter in weight for improved fuel economy along with the slightly more aerodynamic sheet metal which made the 1980 models look a little bigger than their 1977–79 counterparts but overall dimensions changed very little. Engine offerings were shuffled a bit for 1980 with the standard Buick 231 V6 and optional 350 V8 carried over from 1979, with the Buick 350 making its last appearance this year. New options included a larger Buick-built 252 V6, an Oldsmobile-built 307 V8 and a 350 Diesel V8, also built by Oldsmobile. The LeSabre Sport Coupe continued with the four-barrel turbocharged 231 V6 as its standard and only available powerplant. The Sport Coupe was dropped from the line after 1980 along with the Turbo V6 engine due to slow sales, but the Turbo V6 continued on the Regal and Riviera. Following the demise of the Buick 350 V8 after this year, Buick would only build V6 engines as a result of GM's emerging corporate engine policy dictating types of engines built by various divisions for use throughout the corporate lineup. According to the plan, Buick would build V6 engines, Pontiac would manufacture four-cylinder powerplants, Chevrolet would build four-cylinder, V6 and V8 engines, and V8s for larger and higher-priced cars would be sourced from Oldsmobile and Cadillac. This meant that from 1981 onward, V8-powered Buicks would feature Oldsmobile engines, both gasoline and diesel.

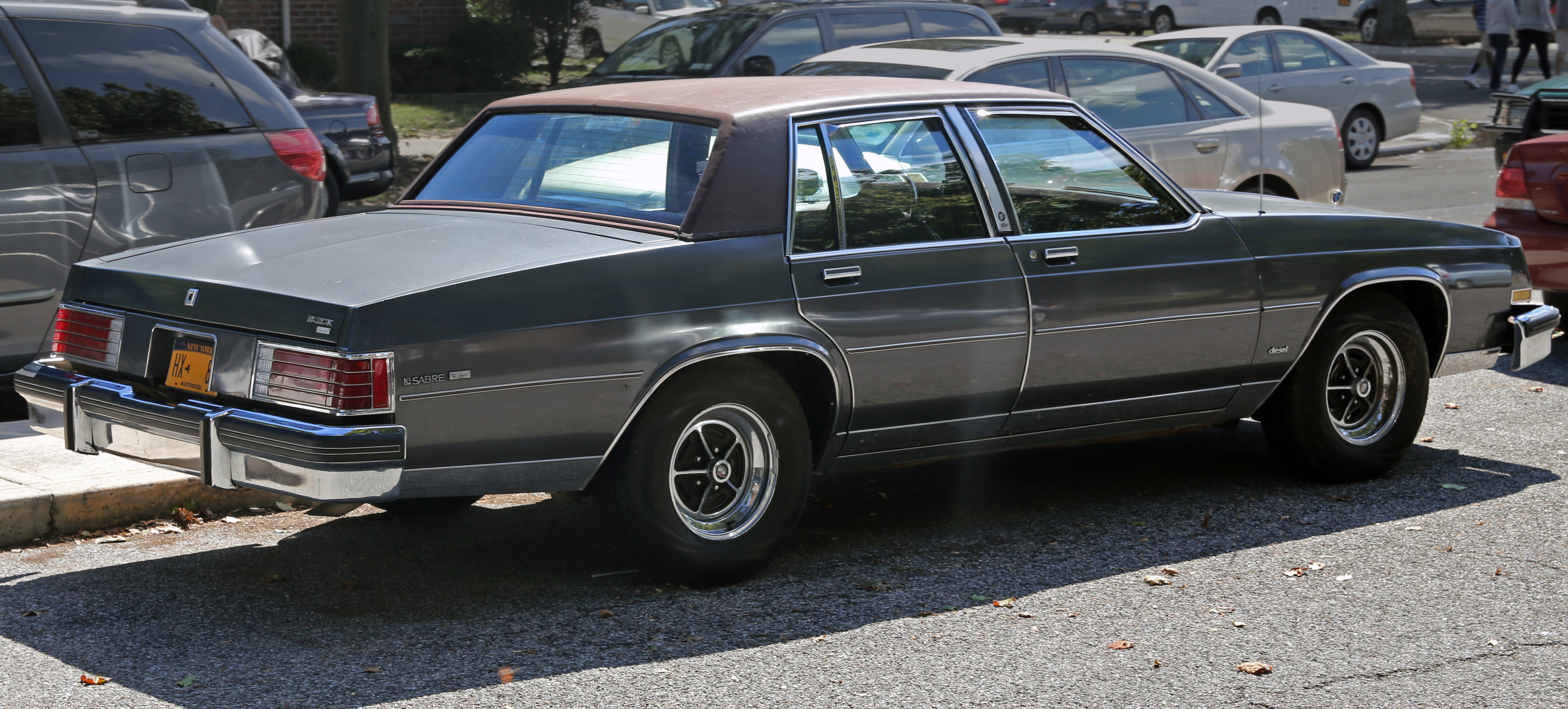
1982 Buick LeSabre Limited diesel sedan rear

Only minor grille and trim changes highlighted the 1981 LeSabre, still offered in base and Limited models. The modified grille now had five (rather than four) rows of openings. Engine offerings included the 231 cubic-inch normally aspirated Buick V6 (standard on sedans and coupes although decidedly underpowered for a car weighing in at around 4,000 lbs.), or optional Olds 307 cubic-inch V8 (standard on wagons, optional on sedans and coupes) and the 350 cubic-inch Oldsmobile-built diesel V8 (optional on all models). All gasoline engines received GM's "Computer Command Control" system to control fuel mixture, spark advance, and emissions controls. The three-speed Turbo Hydra-Matic transmission was standard equipment with the V6 and the diesel V8. New this year was a Turbo Hydra-Matic 200 4-R four-speed automatic overdrive transmission paired with the gasoline V8 engine for improved highway fuel economy. LeSabre and other GM cars for 1981 received new 35 PSI radial tires for improved rolling resistance and fuel economy.

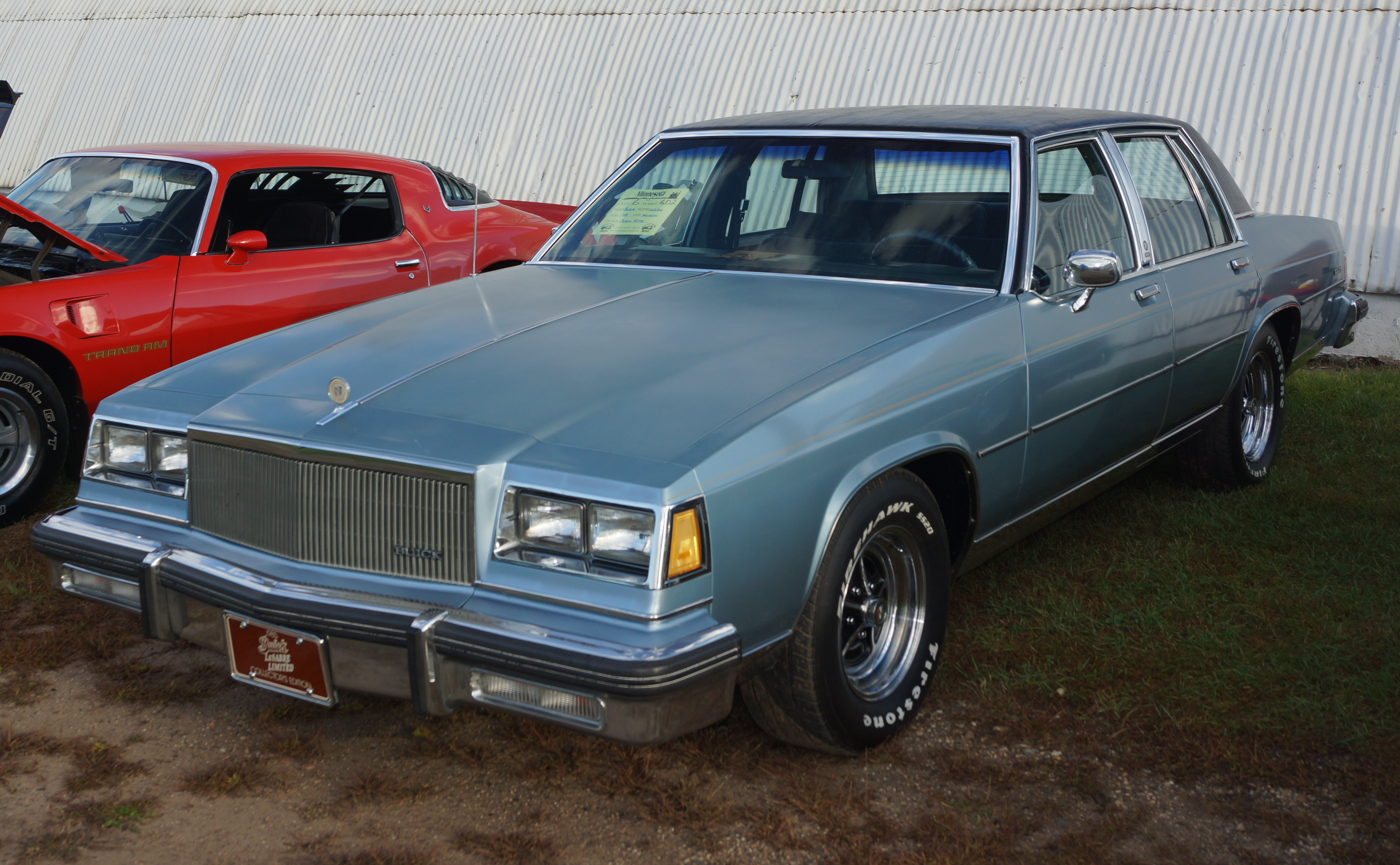
1985 Buick LeSabre Limited Collector's Edition sedan

Few changes were made for the Buick LeSabre for 1982-83 other than revised grilles and trim items. The base LeSabre sedan and coupe models were dropped for 1983 with the LeSabre Custom now the entry-level model and paired with the upscale LeSabre Limited models in both coupe and sedan models. Engine offerings in these two years included the standard Buick 231 V6 or optional 252 V6, or optional Oldsmobile 307 (gasoline) or 350 (Diesel) V8s.

A new front clip that largely resembled the Electra and wider and lower taillights were among the appearance changes for the 1984 Buick LeSabre, still offered in Custom and Limited models. The wagon model was dropped for one year in 1984, before returning in 1985. The 252 V6 was dropped from the option list but all other engines returned including the 231 V6 (standard on coupes and sedans), or optional Oldsmobile 307 gasoline V8 (standard on wagons, optional on sedans and coupes) and Oldsmobile 350 Diesel V8 (optional all models).

1985 would be the final year for the rear-drive LeSabre before another downsizing and conversion to front-wheel-drive for 1986 (sedans and coupes only; the rear-drive LeSabre Estate Wagon would soldier on unchanged a few more years). It was also the last LeSabre sedan and coupe to feature body-on-frame construction, V8 power and Buick's traditional all-coil suspension (the 1992–96 Roadmaster sedans would also be similarly built). The top-line LeSabre Limited became the LeSabre Limited Collectors Edition to mark the end of an era for the rear-drive sedan and coupe. Engine offerings included the standard 231 V6 (sedans and coupes) or optional Olds 307 V8 (which came as standard in the wagons) and Oldsmobile 350 diesel V8 (available in all models). 1985 307s received roller lifters for reduced friction. Meanwhile, the Estate Wagon continued on largely unchanged as a LeSabre or an Electra through 1990.

Production Figures: (For 1986-1990 wagon figures, see Buick Estate)

Buick LeSabre Production Figures:
	Coupe	Sedan	Wagon	Yearly Total
1977	67,044	123,682	25,075	215,801
1978	61,940	109,992	25,964	197,896
1979	49,414	101,370	21,312	172,096
1980	28,903	61,549	9,318	99,770
1981	19,771	58,172	4,934	82,877
1982	21,227	70,444	7,149	98,820
1983	29,003	97,743	9,306	136,052
1984	32,222	122,490	-	154,712
1985	27,367	116,523	5,597	149,487
Total	336,891	861,965	108,655	1,307,511

== Sixth generation (1986–1991) ==
Sixth generation
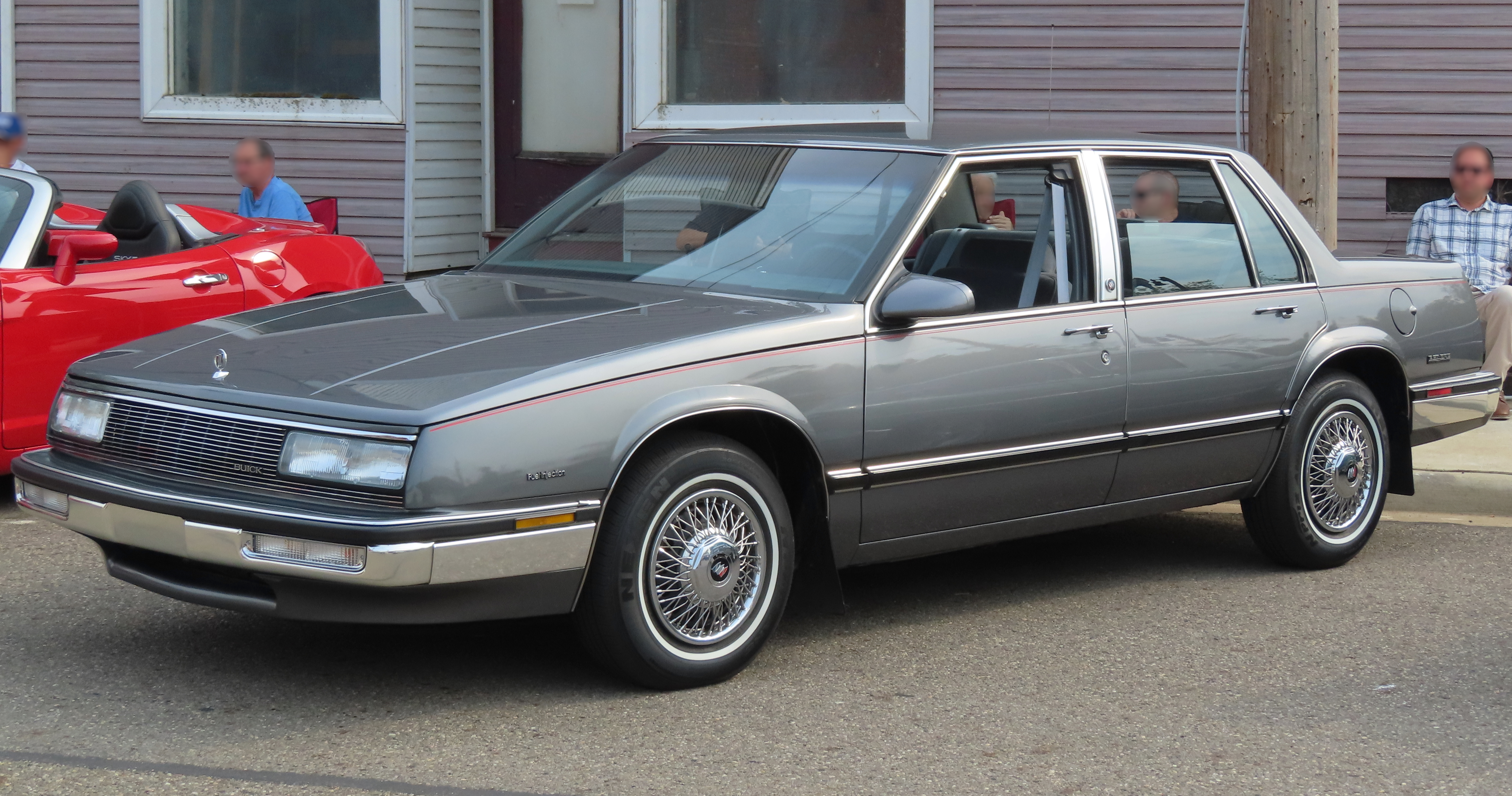
- 1989 LeSabre Limited Sedan

Overview
- Model years: 1986–1991
- Assembly: Flint, Michigan, United States (Buick City)

Body and chassis
- Body style: 2-door coupe 4-door sedan
- Layout: Transverse front-engine, front-wheel drive
- Platform: H-body
- Related: Oldsmobile 88; Pontiac Bonneville

Powertrain
- Engine: 3.0 L LN7 V6; 3.8 L LG2/LG3 V6; 3.8 L LN3 V6
- Transmission: 4-speed 4T60 automatic

Dimensions
- Wheelbase: 110.8 in (2,814 mm)
- Length: 196.5 in (4,991 mm); 197.2 in (5,009 mm) (Limited)
- Width: 72.0 in (1,829 mm)
- Height: 55.4 in (1,407 mm)

For 1986, Buick introduced the sixth generation LeSabre, using GM's newly developed front wheel drive H platform shared with the Oldsmobile Delta 88 and 1987 Pontiac Bonneville — a platform in most respects identical to the front-drive GM C platform. The LeSabre featured a front-hinged clamshell engine hood, shared with the Buick Electra and flush, aerodynamic styling — but without Buick's hallmark ventiports or sweepspear.

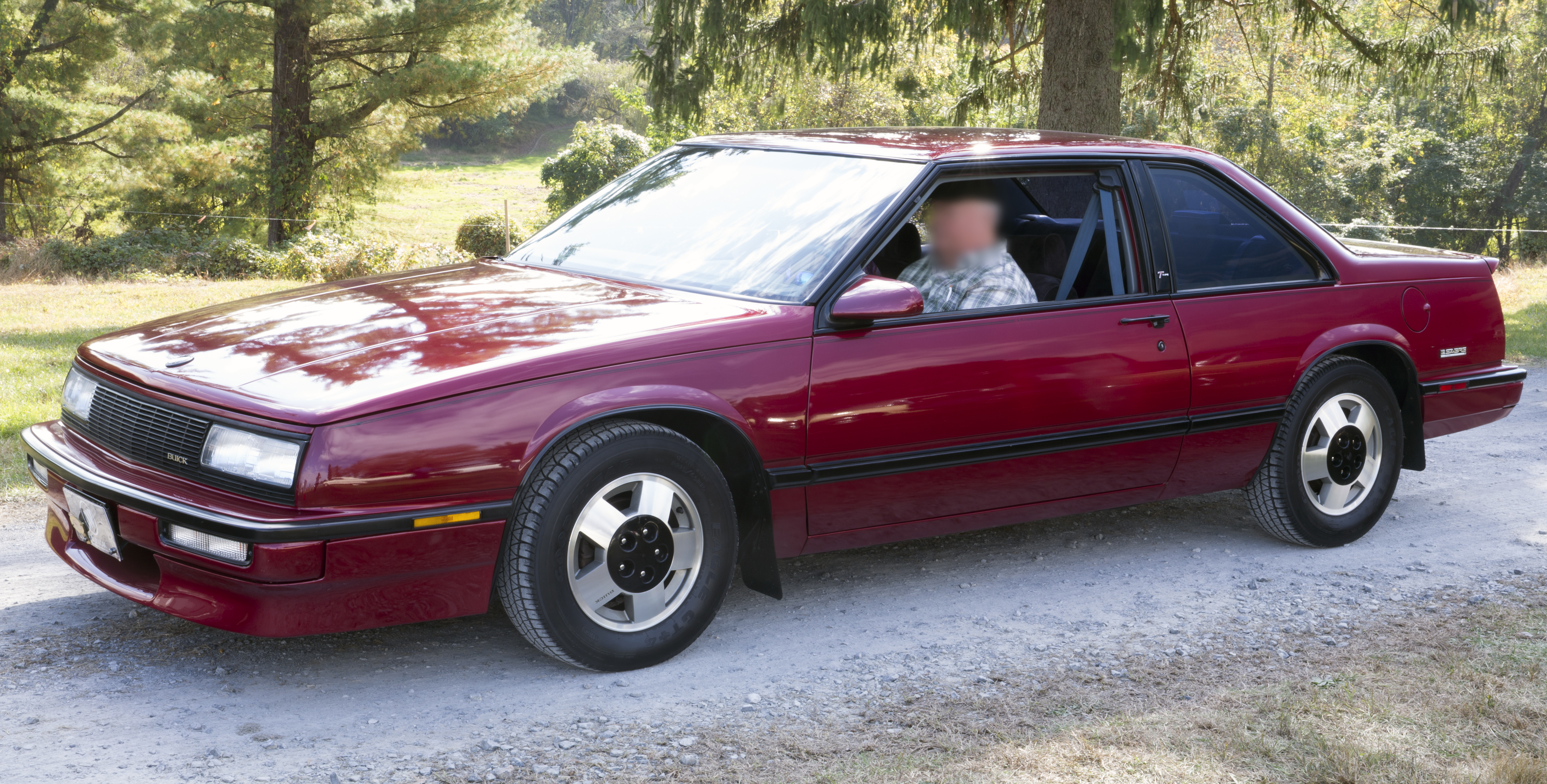
1988 Buick LeSabre T-type coupe

Most Buick LeSabre models from this generation were powered by Buick's 3.8 liter (231 cubic-inch) V6 engine. It started out with 150 hp (112 kW). It added balance shafts to become the famous "3800" V6 for 1988, with 165 hp (123 kW). This engine increased to 170 hp (127 kW) in 1991 with the addition of Tuned Port Injection. The 1986 model featured the 3.0 liter (181 cubic-inch) V6 as standard. The sixth generation featured Dynaride, four wheel independent suspension, as well as automatic load leveling, which used an air compressor to pressurize the rear Chapman Struts to maintain level ride height — and was not available on vehicles equipped with Gran Touring Suspension. Each year received slight design changes.

1986: At its inception, the LeSabre featured sealed-beam headlights. Exclusively for 1986, Buick offered the LeSabre Grand National model to homologate the coupe body-style with smaller quarter windows for NASCAR competition. Fewer than 120 were made. The Grand National featured a black exterior with gray interior.

1987: 1987 models received composite headlamps with exchangeable bulbs. In compliance with U.S. passive restraint standards, front seat belts were door-mounted for the front outboard positions and three-point at the rear outboard positions — for coupe models with the start of 1987 production (September 1986) and for sedans beginning with December 1986 production.

Superseding the 1986 Grand National, for 1987 Buick introduced the LeSabre T-Type (1987-1989). The package included 15-inch aluminum wheels, blackwall tires, heavy duty engine and transmission cooling, revised suspension (marketed as Gran Touring), 2.97 Final Drive Ratio, leather-wrapped steering wheel and shift handle, tilt steering column, wipers with delay feature, electronic cruise control, red and amber tail lamps, dual exhaust outlets, black trim (side, belt, roof drip, wheel openings, tail lamps, door handles, lock cylinders and grille), flush hood ornament, black cloth 45/45 Seats, carpet savers, T-Type identification, rear deck spoiler, front air dam, stereo radio (with graphic equalizer, cassette tape and red backlighting), console with red backlighting, black-trimmed operation controls (e.g., heating, air conditioning and steering column), analog gauge cluster with red backlighting, voltmeter, oil pressure, tachometer, and coolant temperature gauges. Available exterior colors included silver, white, black and red.

1988: For 1988, the optional 3.8 engine was replaced with the much-modified, balance shaft-equipped LN3 3800 (vin code C, aka pre-series I 3800).

1989: In the engine bay, 1989 models received revised positions for the battery, washer fluid tank, and coolant overflow tank.

1990: 1990 models received a revised tail light design and front bumper/grille, where the center grille element dropped slightly relative to the outboard grille elements. For 1990, the T-Type trim package was dropped.

1991: 1991 models were largely identical to the 1990 model cars aside from a small power increase.

Beginning in 1989 and continuing for several years, J.D. Power noted the LeSabre as one of the highest rated automobiles in customer satisfaction based on factors such as quality and reliability.

Production Figures:

Buick LeSabre Production Figures
	Coupe	Sedan	Yearly Total
1986	21,522	73,450	94,972
1987	12,776	131,189	143,965
1988	11,303	74,737	86,040
1989	4,117	140,066	144,183
1990	4,261	159,120	163,381
1991	1,181	89,575	90,756
Total	55,160	668,137	723,297

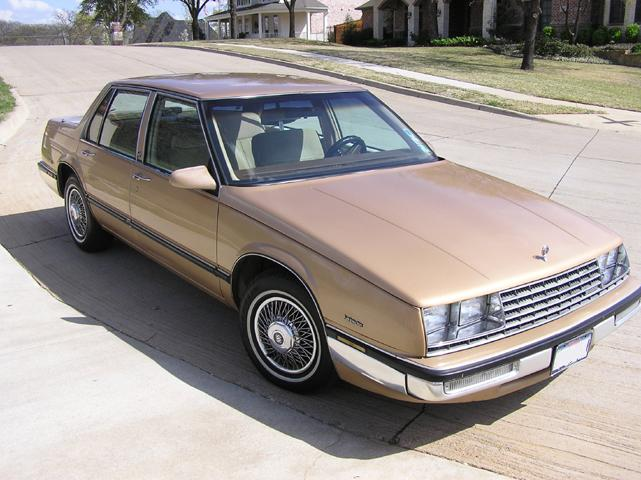
1986 Buick LeSabre sedan, showing the 1986 exclusive sealed-beam headlamps

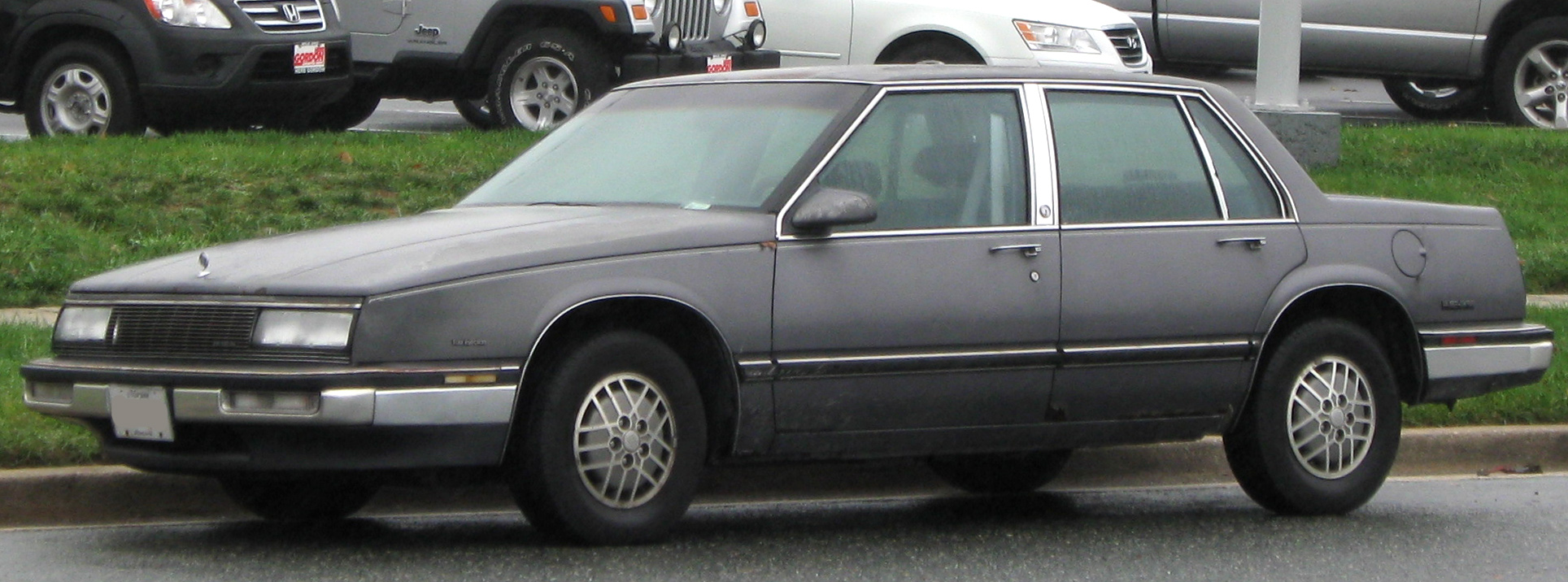
1987–1989 Buick LeSabre Limited sedan

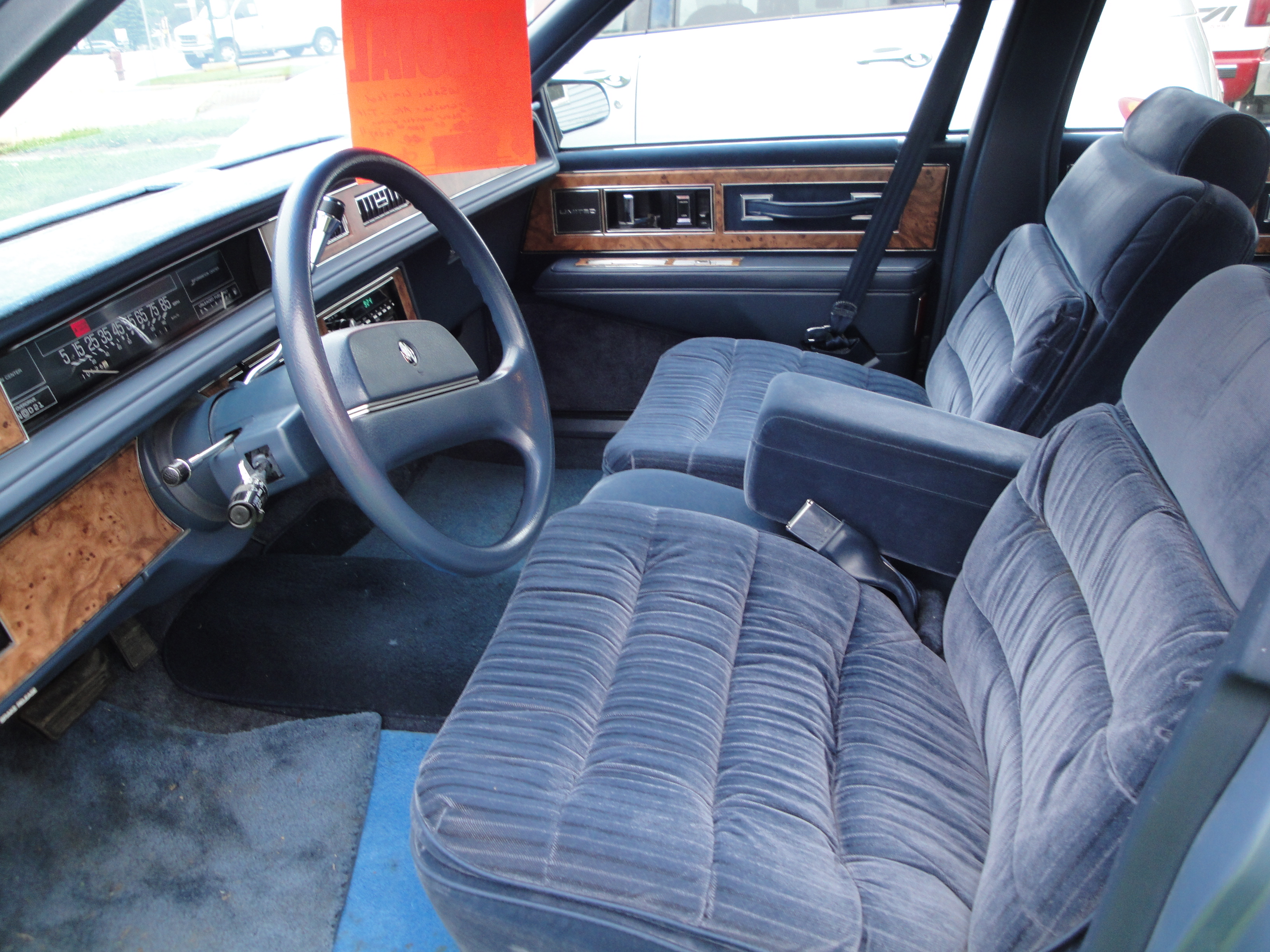
1989 Buick LeSabre Limited interior

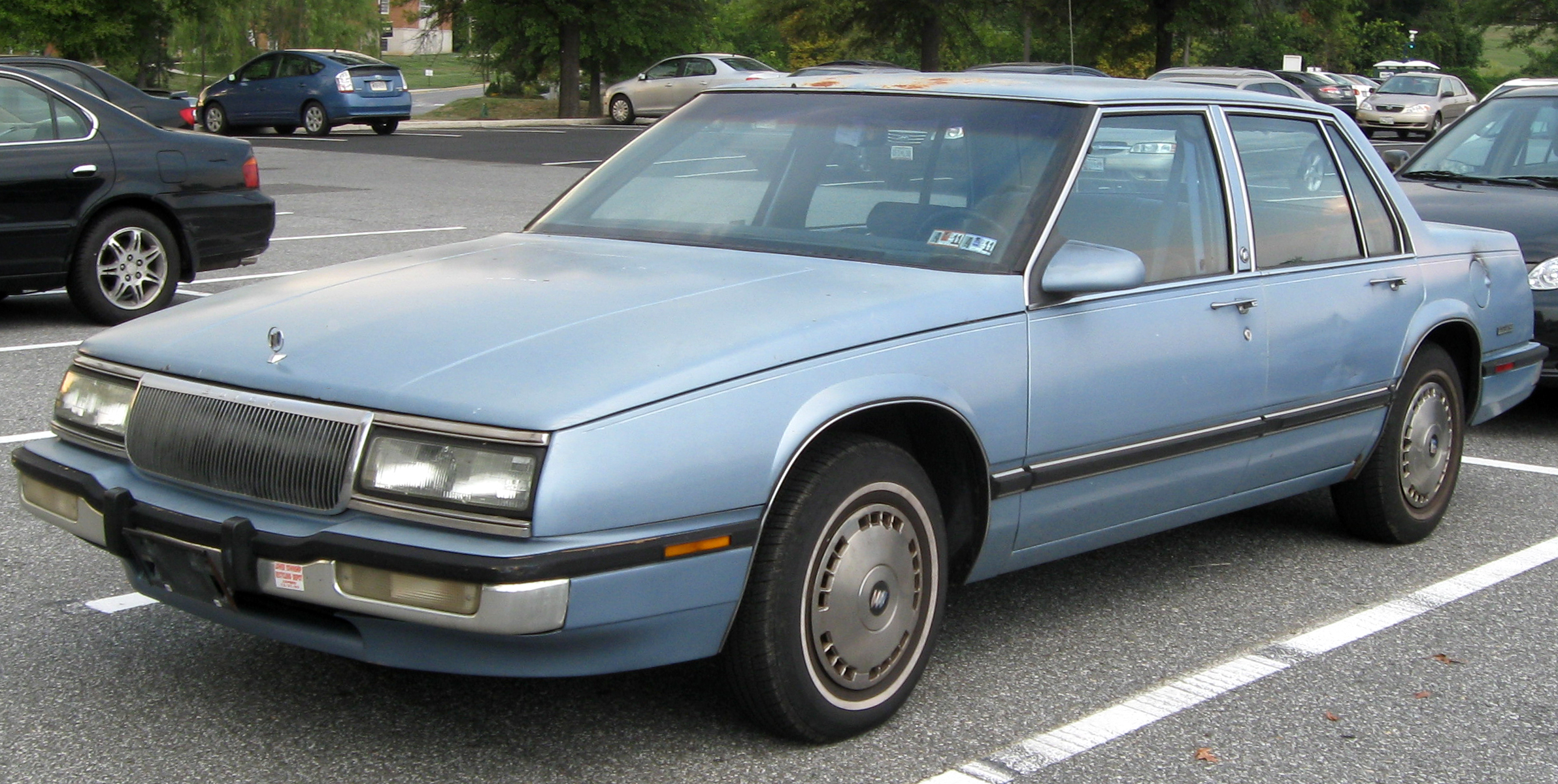
1990–1991 Buick LeSabre sedan

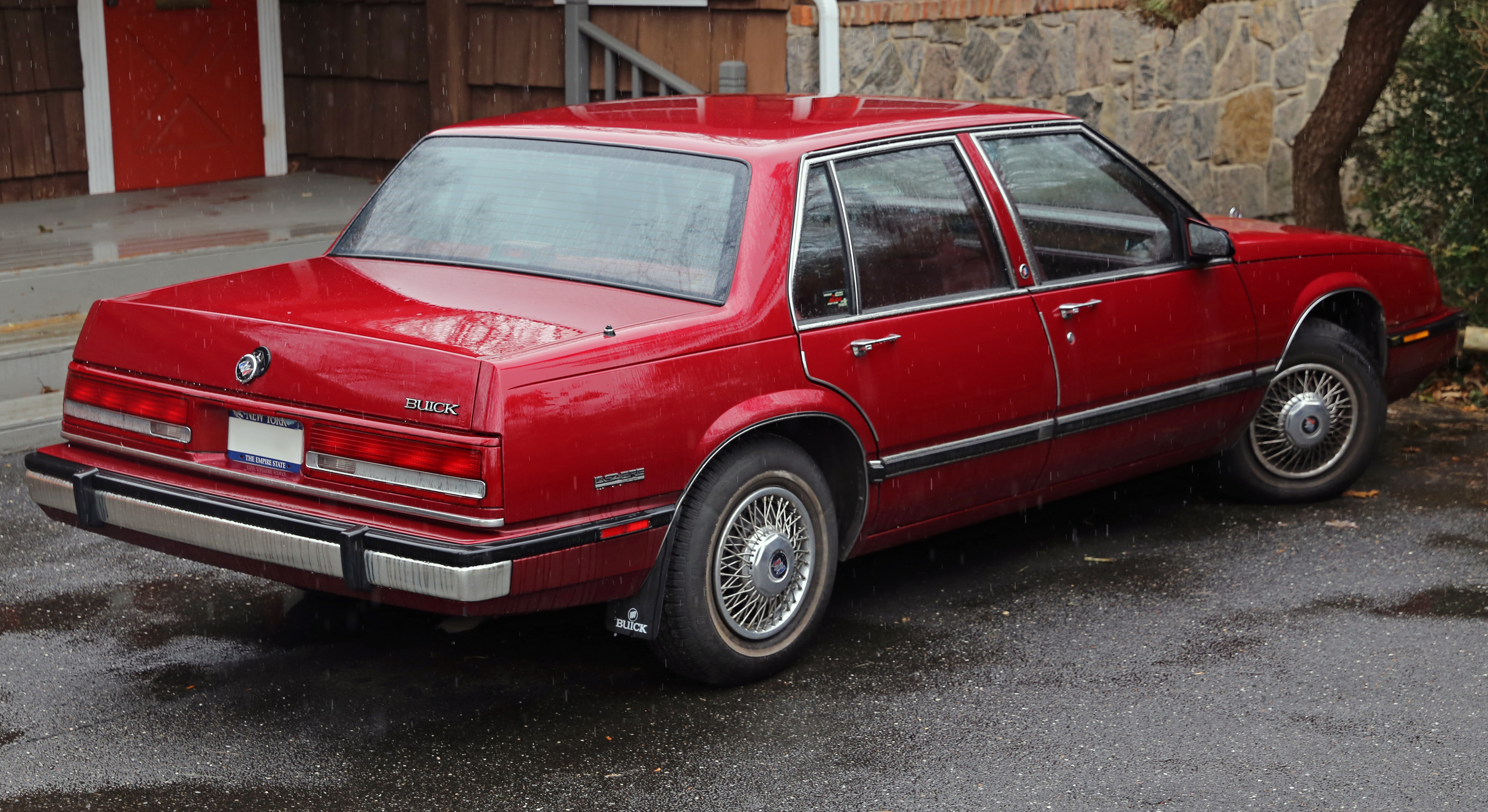
Rear view of a 1990-1991 Buick LeSabre Custom sedan

== Seventh generation (1992–1999) ==
Seventh generation
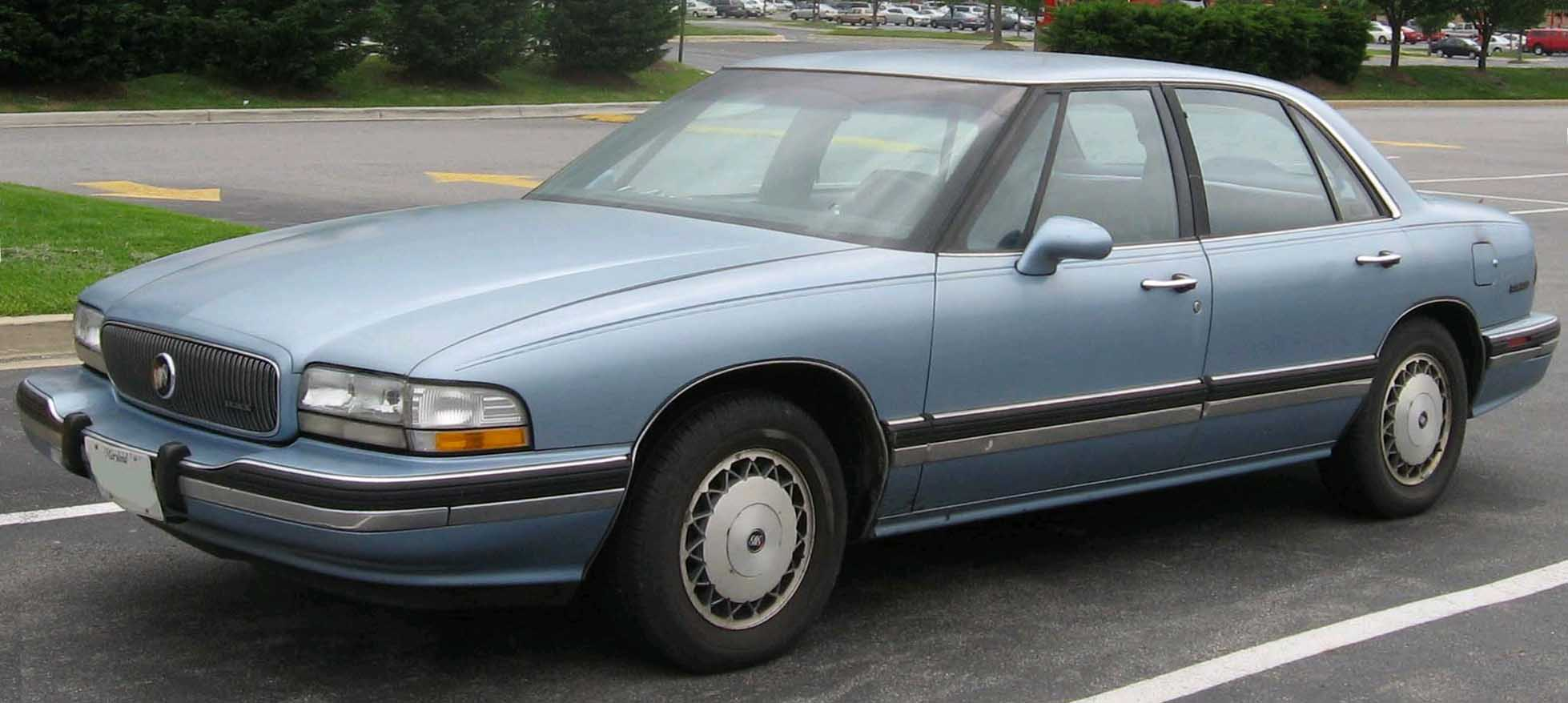

Overview
- Production: 1991–June 1999
- Model years: 1992–1999
- Assembly: Flint, Michigan, United States (Buick City)
- Designer: Bill Porter

Body and chassis
- Body style: 4-door sedan
- Layout: Transverse front-engine, front-wheel drive
- Platform: H-body
- Related: Oldsmobile 88/Regency/LSS; Pontiac Bonneville

Powertrain
- Engine: 3.8 L 3800 Series I V6; 3.8 L 3800 Series II V6
- Transmission: 4-speed 4T60-E automatic 4-speed 4T65-E automatic

Dimensions
- Wheelbase: 110.8 in (2,814 mm)
- Length: 200.0 in (5,080 mm) (1992–96); 200.8 in (5,100 mm) (1997–99)
- Width: 74.9 in (1,902 mm)
- Height: 55.7 in (1,415 mm) (1992–96); 55.6 in (1,412 mm) (1997–99); 55.9 in (1,420 mm) (1997–99)
- Curb weight: 3,441 lb (1,561 kg)

This LeSabre was introduced in 1991 for the 1992 model year, and was redesigned along the same lines as the previous year's Park Avenue. The two-door coupe was dropped, leaving only a four-door sedan from this point forward. The headlights were streamlined with a separated amber turn signal strip wrapping around the lower front fascia. The rear fascia featured a wider trunk mouth and lower lift over height to ease loading baggage while the front was smoothed with simplified chrome molding and absent bumperettes. The LeSabre also featured GM's plastic body technologies, with high-stress plastic replacing traditional steel in the front fenders. The hood was now conventionally hinged from the rear, abandoning the previous generation's front-hinged design.

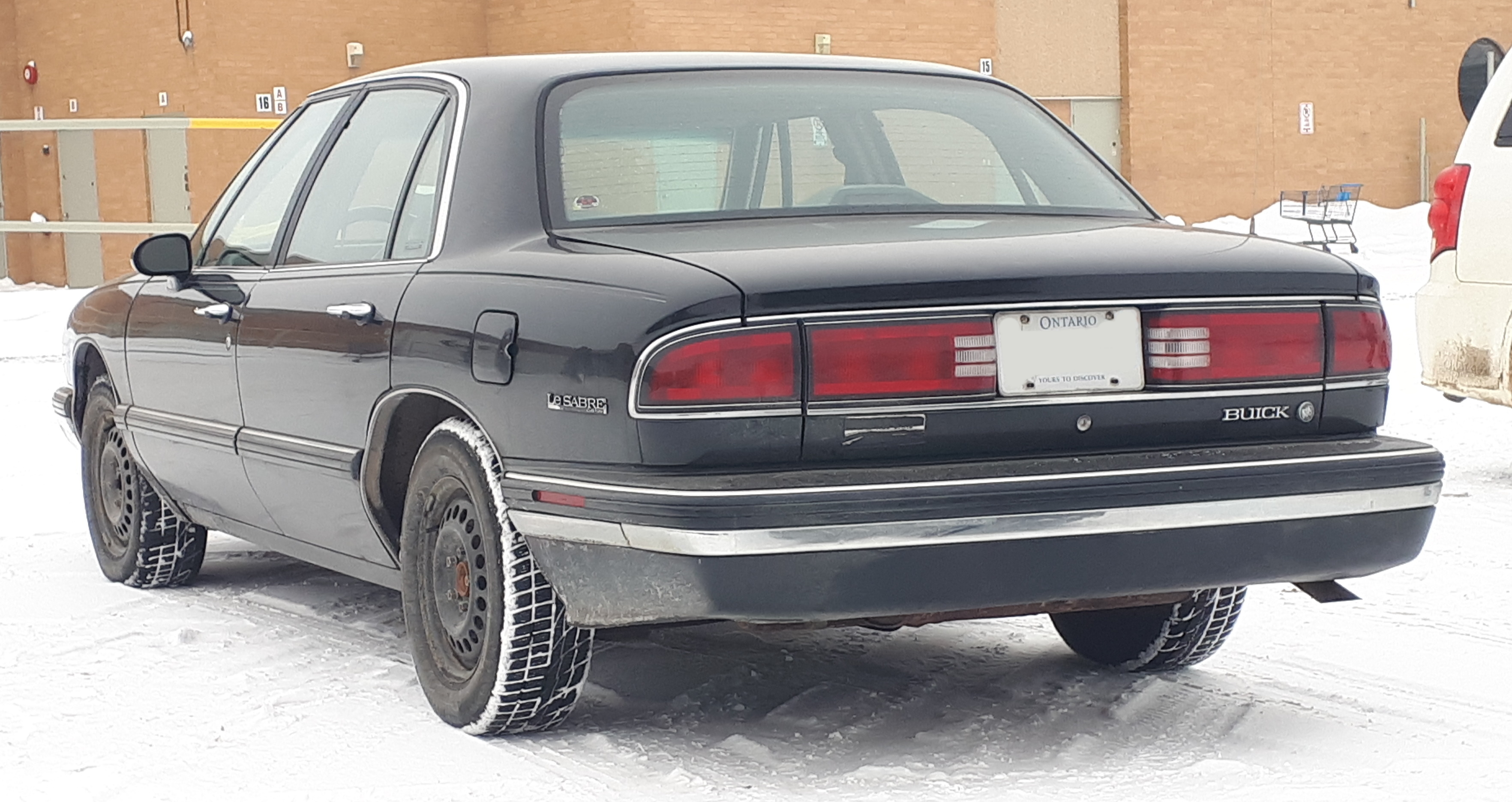
Rear view of 1994-96 Buick LeSabre

The LeSabre's engine from 1992 to 1995 was the 3800 V6 (L27), which produced 170 hp (127 kW) and 225 lb·ft (305 N·m) The 3,513 pounds (1,593 kg) car got 18 mpg (13.1 L/100 km) in the city and 28 mpg (8.4 L/100 km) on the highway, which was slightly better than the 1991 model. The car accelerated to 60 mph (97 km/h) in 8.9 seconds and could cover the quarter mile in 16.9 seconds at 80 mph (130 km/h). Top speed was electronically limited to 108 mph (174 km/h).

This generation saw the installation of Gran Touring Suspension, which included an air compressor that would pressurize the rear Chapman struts to maintain a level overall ride height, along with a slightly lower 3.08:1 final drive ratio (as opposed to the standard 2.93:1). A badge was installed on the dashboard to the left of the steering column on all vehicles equipped. It was not available on vehicles equipped with Dynaride.

The LeSabre was offered in two trim levels. The Custom trim level was the base level. The Limited was the premium trim level featuring alloy wheels, front hood ornament, and fold down access panels in the rear seat to access the trunk. The car had an 18-gallon fuel tank, anti-lock brakes, and a power radio antenna located in the rear passenger side quarter panel. Instrumentation included gas gauge, speedometer, and gear indicator. Optional instrumentation included a tachometer and temperature, oil pressure, and charging voltage gauges.

A dealer installed option named the "Wildcat Edition" was introduced. The Wildcat Edition featured a vinyl top, Wildcat logos (on C-pillars and front fender behind the wheel), embroidered leather seat upholstery and fender skirts. Little is known about the Wildcat Edition.

In 1993, a special edition LeSabre was sold to commemorate Buick's 90th anniversary. In addition to Custom trim level standard equipment, this model included "90th Anniversary" badging, cassette player, cruise control, rear window defogger, power driver's seat, carpeted floor mats, exterior pinstripes, and choice of wire or aluminum wheel covers.

For 1996, the LeSabre received the 3800 Series II powerplant, with a gain of 35 hp (26 kW). The engine increased fuel economy ratings over its predecessor, 19 MPG city and 30 MPG highway United States Environmental Protection Agency estimates.

=== 1997 facelift ===
Buick facelifted the LeSabre for 1997, relocating the turn signal indicators to the front bumper instead of the headlamp assembly, providing a revised gauge cluster with a tachometer, using galvanized steel fenders (rather than composite), as well as revising the grille, rear backup lights and trim.

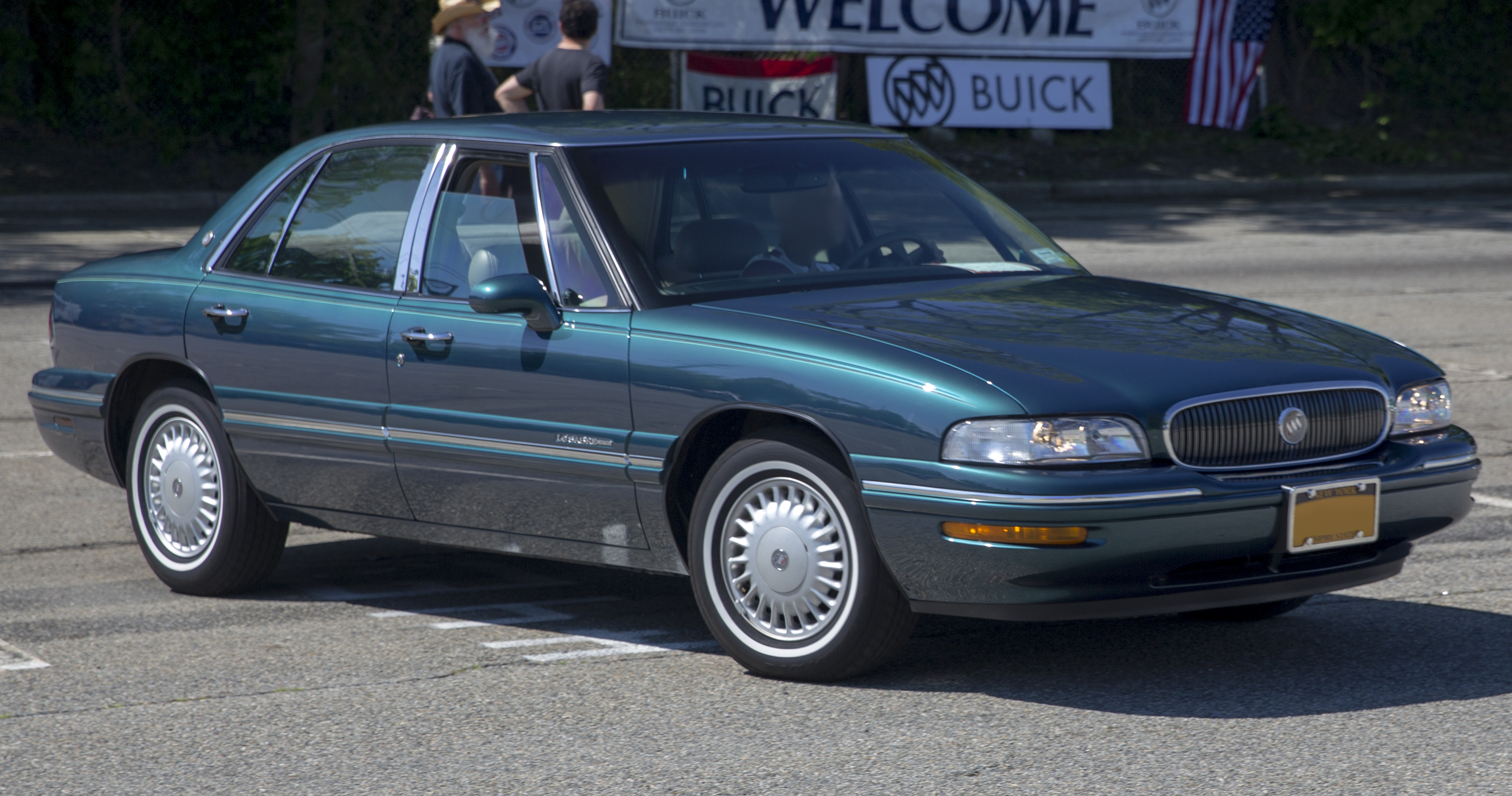
Facelift Buick LeSabre Limited (1998)

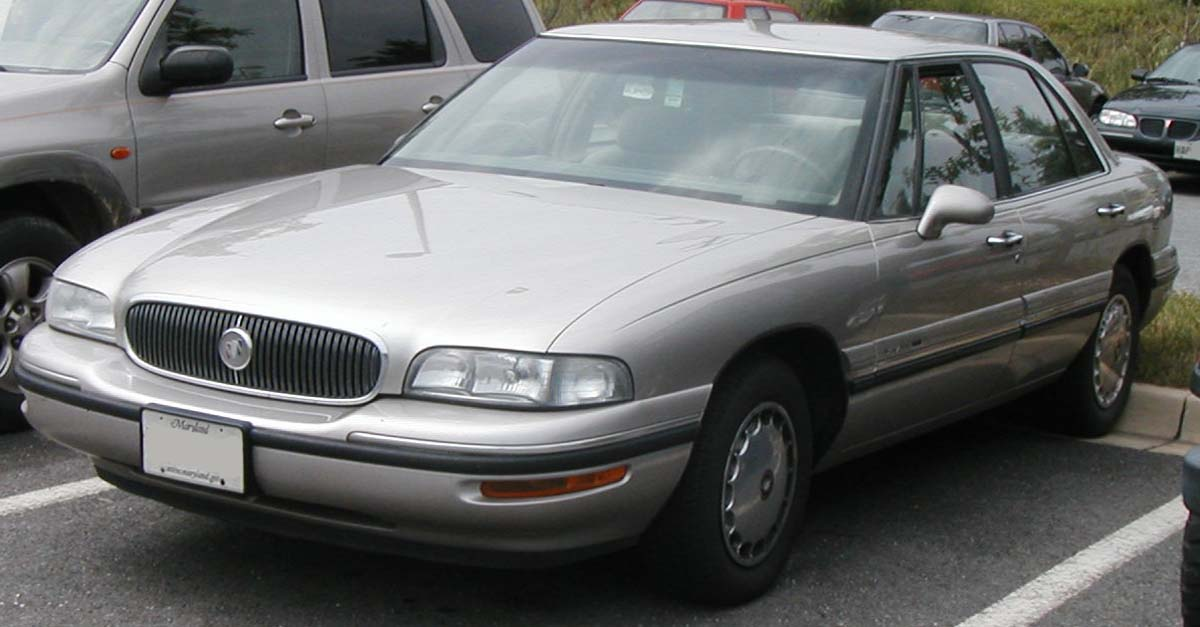
1997-99 Buick LeSabre

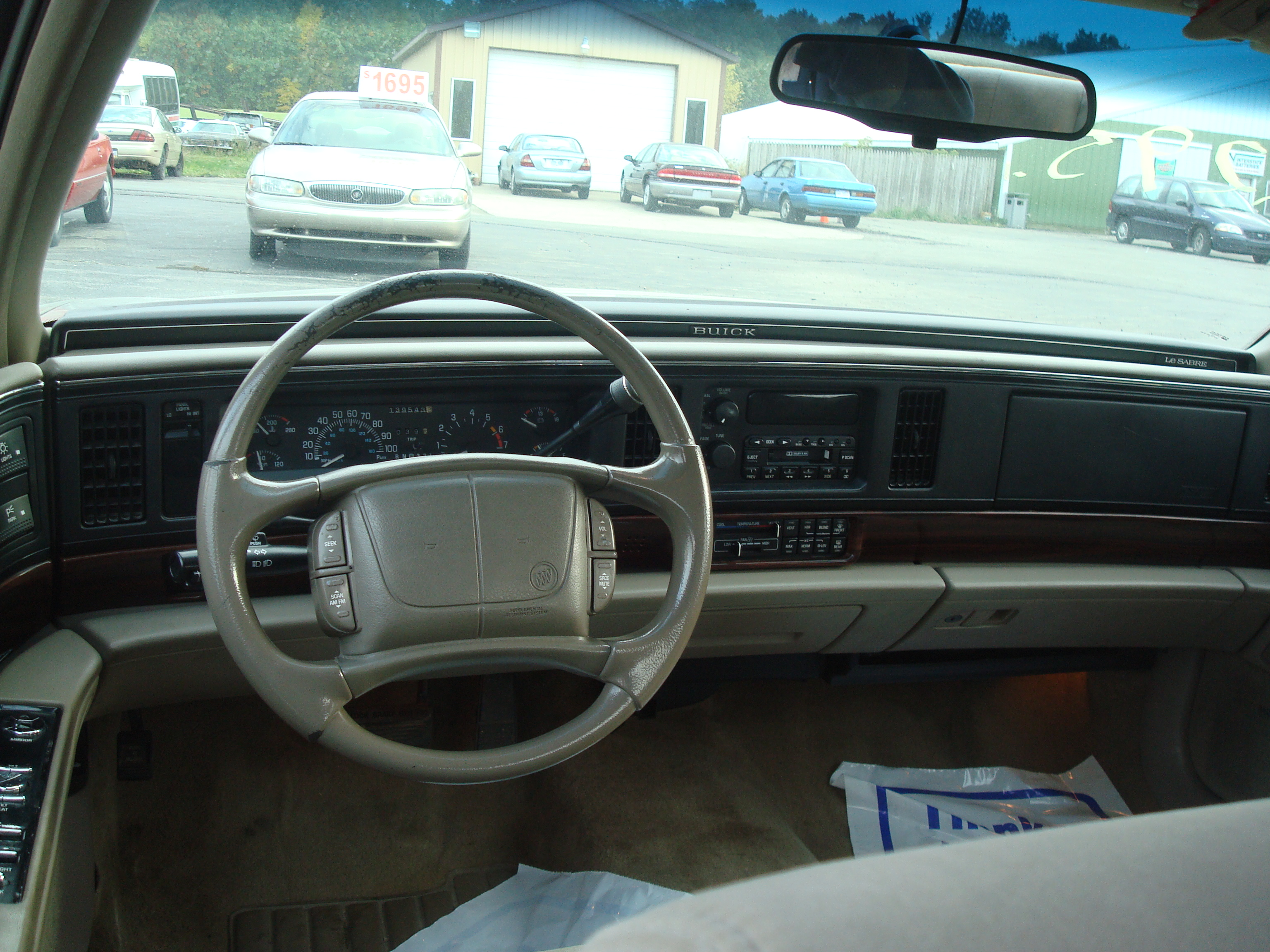
Late '90s LeSabre dashboard

In 1999, Flint, Michigan's Buick City assembly plant, which manufactured the LeSabre as well as the Pontiac Bonneville ceased operations and LeSabre production moved to Hamtramck. The last 1999 LeSabre left Buick City's final line, becoming also the last Buick City-manufactured car — in June 1999.

Production Figures:

Buick LeSabre Production Figures
	Yearly Total
1992	161,736
1993	143,466
1994	159,250
1995	163,524
1996	52,061
1997	211,651
1998	143,251
1999	n/a

== Eighth generation (2000–2005) ==
Eighth generation
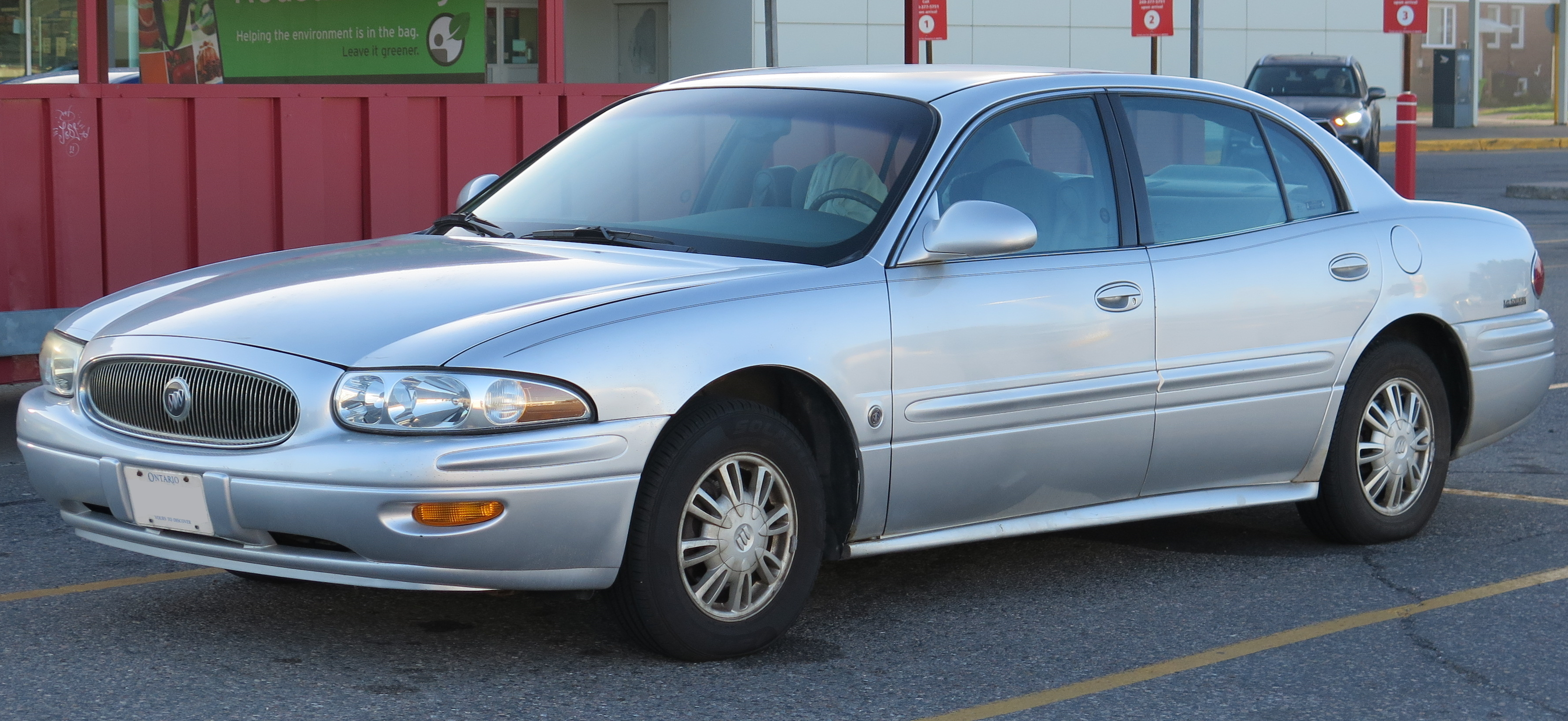

Overview
- Production: March 1999 - August 2005
- Model years: 2000–2005
- Assembly: Lake Orion, Michigan, United States (Orion Assembly); Hamtramck, Michigan, United States (Detroit/Hamtramck Assembly)

Body and chassis
- Body style: 4-door sedan
- Layout: Transverse front-engine, front-wheel drive
- Platform: G platform/GMX220
- Related: Pontiac Bonneville; Oldsmobile Aurora; Buick Riviera; Cadillac Seville

Powertrain
- Engine: 3.8 L Series II Buick 3800 V6
- Transmission: 4-speed 4T65-E automatic

Dimensions
- Wheelbase: 112.2 in (2,850 mm)
- Length: 200 in (5,080 mm)
- Width: 73.5 in (1,867 mm)
- Height: 57 in (1,448 mm)
- Curb weight: 3,567 lb (1,618 kg)

The eighth generation LeSabre was introduced in March 1999 using the GM's G platform; which GM continued to call the H platform. The LeSabre was manufactured at GM's Detroit/Hamtramck Assembly factory in Hamtramck, Michigan, and Lake Orion Assembly, in Lake Orion, Michigan.

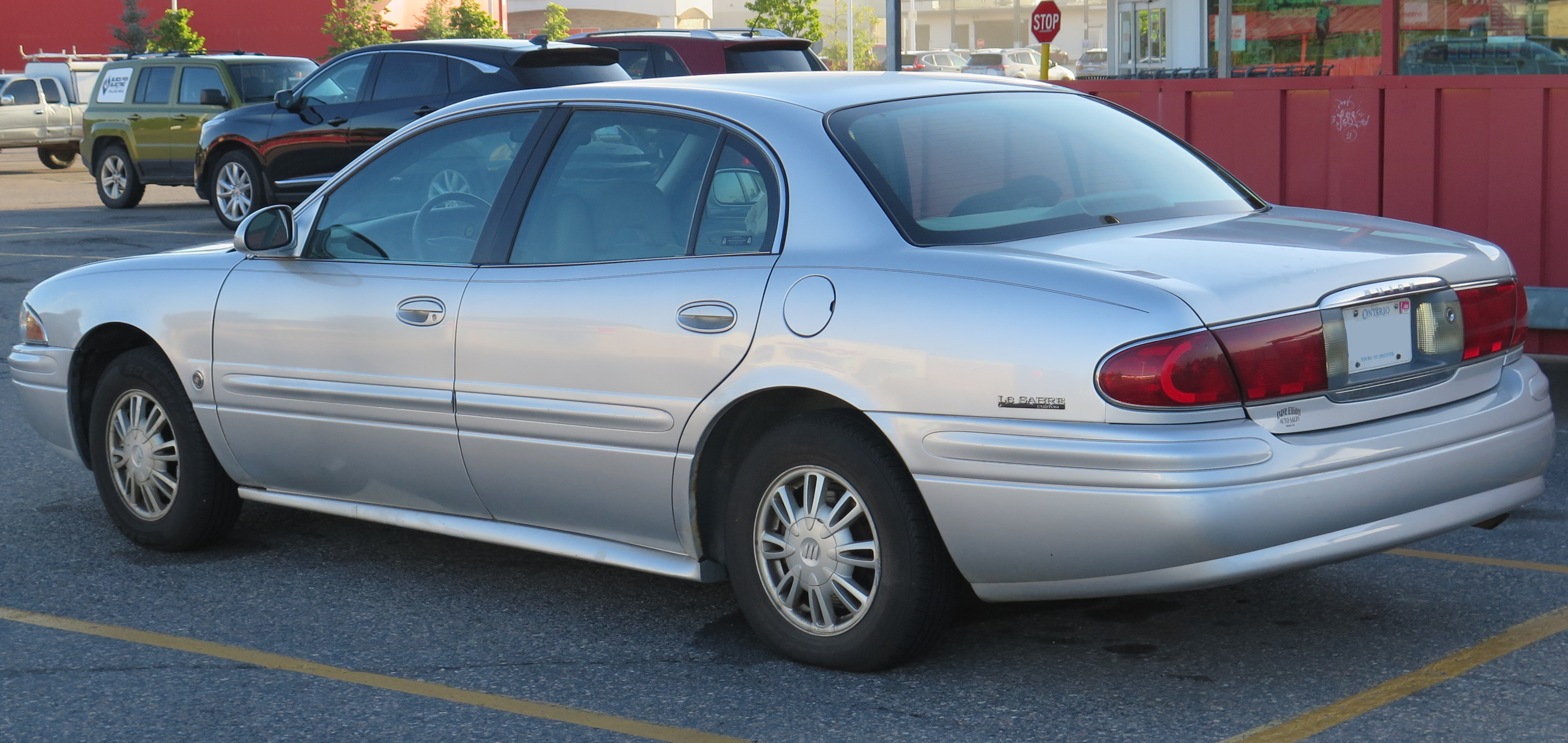
Rear view

Despite its slightly narrower exterior dimensions, the eighth generation offered similar interior room and more trunk space than the outgoing generation, and featured a cabin filter accessed from passenger side of the engine compartment, against the firewall. Trim levels again included Custom and Limited. Changes included a new grille no longer integral with the hood.

In 2003, a Celebration Edition package recognizing Buick's centennial added to the Limited trim pearlescent with either White Diamond or Crimson Pearl tricoat paint schemes, a blacked-out grille, 16-inch chrome wheels, and special badging. Though created to commemorate Buick's centennial in 2003, the package remained available in 2004 and 2005. Other features optional or standard on the LeSabre included Stabilitrak, OnStar, EyeCue heads-up display, all-weather traction control, automatic load-leveling, side airbags, tire pressure monitoring system, heated seats, dual-zone climate control, and automatic windshield wipers marketed as RainSense.

A Platinum Edition package could be added to the 2004 Custom trim level.

The standard, and only available, engine for the eighth-generation LeSabre was the 3.8 L Series II Buick 3800 V6 providing:

- Power: 205 horsepower (153 kilowatts)
- Torque: 230 lb·ft (312 N·m)

== Discontinuation ==
The LeSabre was North America's best-selling full-size car when it was discontinued at the end of the 2005 model year. It was replaced in 2006 by the Lucerne, Buick's newly designed flagship. The last LeSabre rolled off the Lake Orion, Michigan, assembly line on June 18, 2004 (retooling the plant to build the Pontiac G6) and the last Hamtramck, Michigan LeSabre (And the last LeSabre to ever be built) rolled off the assembly line on August 24, 2005.
