= Pontiac Parisienne =

Pontiac Parisienne Pontiac Grande Parisienne
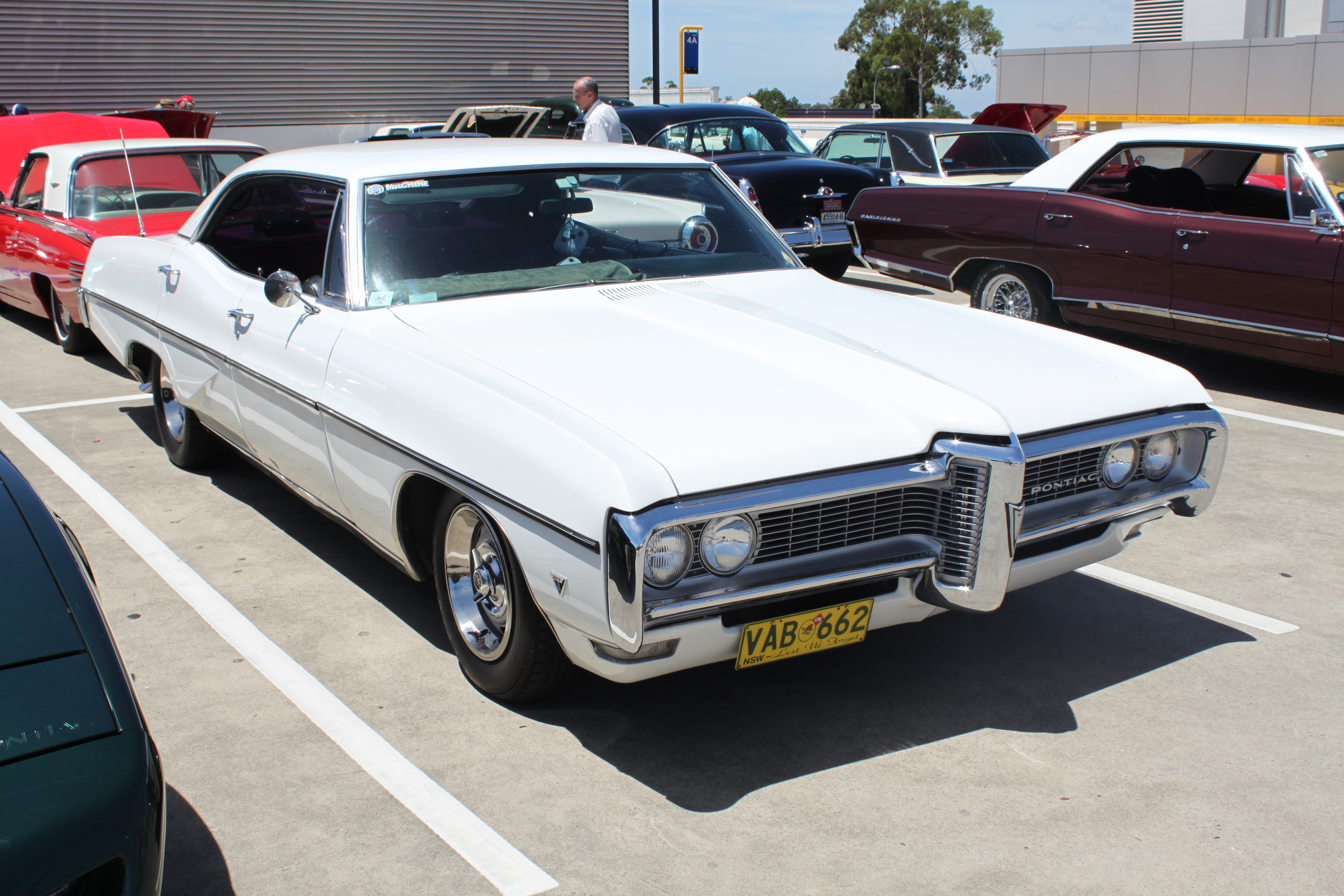
- 1968 Pontiac Parisienne Sport Sedan

Overview
- Manufacturer: Pontiac (General Motors)
- Production: 1959–1987
- Assembly: Oshawa Car Assembly, Oshawa, Ontario, Canada Australia

Body and chassis
- Class: Fullsize car
- Layout: FR layout

Chronology
- Predecessor: Pontiac Catalina (For U.S.); Pontiac Bonneville (original full-size model)
- Successor: Pontiac Bonneville (1987); Pontiac G8 (for RWD); Australia (1968): Holden Brougham

The Pontiac Parisienne (Note: Pronounced /pəˌriːziːˈɛn/ pə-REE-zee-EN) is a full-size rear-wheel drive vehicle that was sold by Pontiac on the GM B platform in Canada from 1958 to 1986 and in the United States from 1983 to 1986. Right-hand drive models were locally assembled in Australia and South Africa until 1969. For most of its run, the Canadian Parisienne was nearly mechanically identical to the American Chevrolet Impala or Chevrolet Caprice. The Parisienne wagon continued under the Safari nameplate until 1989.

The model name comes from the French word Parisienne, which refers to a grammatically female person or thing from Paris.

== Differences from US Pontiacs ==
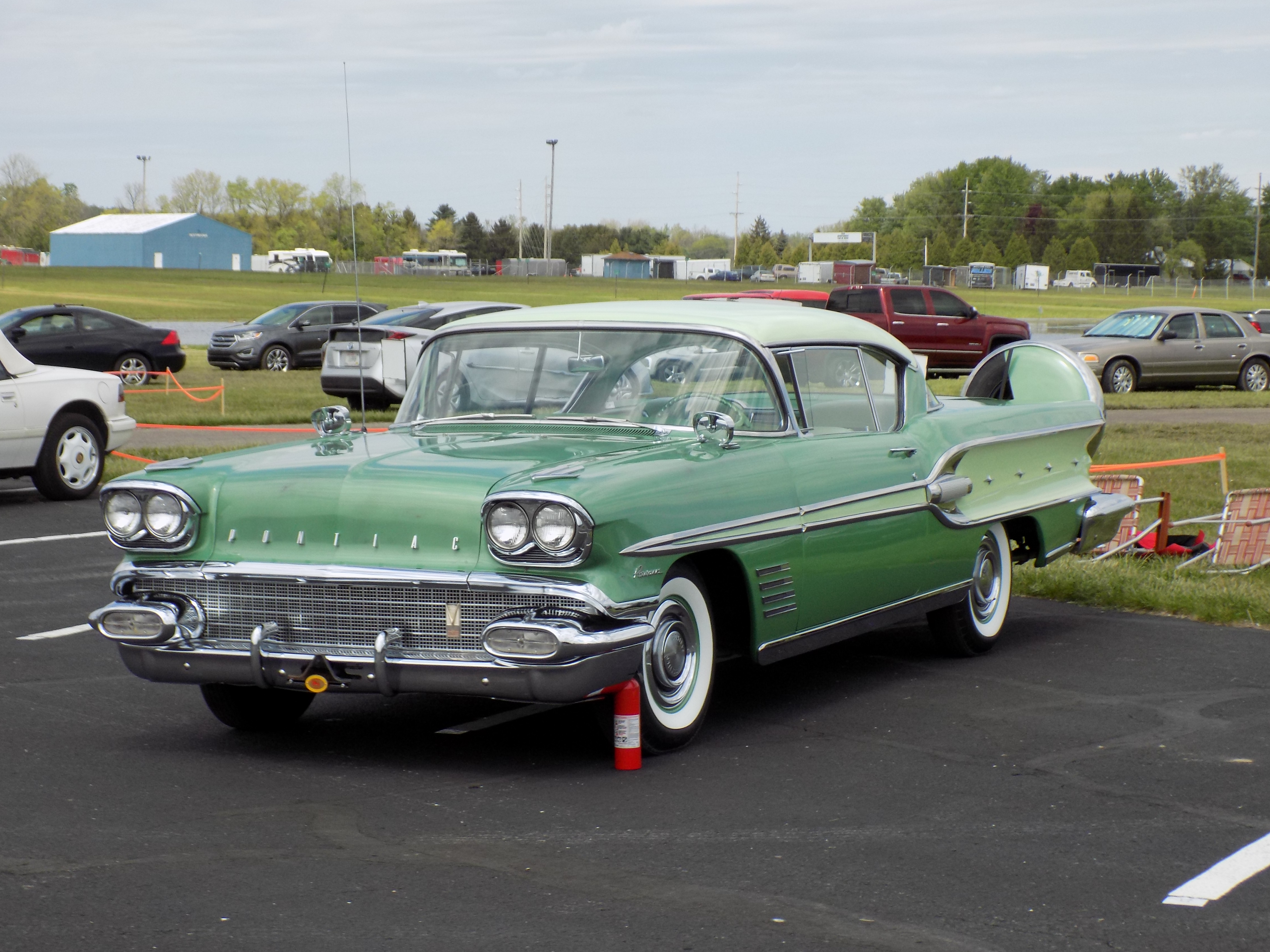
1958 Pontiac Parisienne Sport Coupe

The Parisienne entered the production lineup as a sub-series within the Laurentian line in the 1958 model year. Parisienne became a separate model in 1959.

For most of its life, the Parisienne was the Canadian nameplate for the top-of-the-line model sold in GM of Canada's Pontiac showrooms. Parisiennes were distinct from other Canadian Pontiac models by their standard features: the luxuriousness of upholstery fabrics; standard equipment such as courtesy interior and trunk lights; bright trim mouldings in the interior; distinct exterior accent chrome pieces; and availability of two- and four-door hardtops and convertibles.

In particular, Canadian "full size" Pontiacs were actually closely related to Chevrolets, making use of the economical Chevrolet chassis and drivetrain, though with the American Pontiac-styled exterior body panels (They weren't the same as U.S. Pontiac panels since they had to fit the shorter-wheelbase 119-inch Chevrolet "X" frame. U.S. Pontiacs used a full perimeter frame.) and interior instrument panels. As Chevrolets under the skin, Canadian Pontiacs including the Parisienne used the same engines and transmissions as full-size Chevys, including the 230 and 250 cubic inch 6 cylinder and 283, 307, 327, 350, 396, 400, 409, 427 and 454 cu inch V8s. These engines were mated to the same transmissions as Chevrolet, including 3 and 4 speed manual and the 2 speed Powerglide and later the three-speed Turbo Hydra-Matic automatic transmissions.

The first Parisienne, offered for the 1958 model year, was a super deluxe "halo" model in the Laurentian line, much like Chevrolet's Bel Air Impala of the same year. Chevrolet's Ramjet fuel injection system, introduced in 1957 in the U.S., was a Parisienne option as well. It was marketed as the "Power Chief" option, but it was identical to Chevy's Ramjet. Also available for the first year Parisienne was Chevrolet's Turboglide automatic transmission.

Built in the same GM of Canada assembly plant in Oshawa, Ontario, Pontiacs had parallel model lineups as "full size" Chevrolets: the Pontiac "Strato Chief" had similar trim level and upholstery as Chevrolet's "Biscayne", the "Laurentian" matched the trim level of the Chevrolet "Bel Air" and while the Parisienne offered similar amenities as Chevrolet's "Impala", the Pontiac version had unique and more costly upholstery fabrics, and beginning in 1964 the "Custom Sport" (later rebadged the "2+2") two-door hardtop and convertible model line was in lock-step with Chevrolet's "Super Sport". Finally, starting in 1966 Pontiac offered the "Grande Parisienne", in two-door and four-door hardtop models parallel to Chevrolet's luxurious "Caprice," although Grande Parisiennes through 1967 used the styling of the US-market Grand Prix. Also for 1967 and 1968 a Grande Parisienne wagon was offered. Through most of its life, the Parisienne resembled the US-market Bonneville despite its Chevrolet underpinnings.

In contrast, the Pontiac Motor Division of GM in the US manufactured models with drivetrains, chassis and equipment unique from the other GM stablemates—Chevrolet, Oldsmobile, Buick, and Cadillac. Through much of the 1950s through 1970s, the American Pontiac model lineup included the "Catalina", "Ventura", "Executive", "Star Chief" and as the top of the line model, the "Bonneville". Additionally, unique to the US lineup until 1969 was the "Grand Prix", a distinct 2-door hardtop model with unique styling features and both luxury and "sporty" accoutrements such high output V8s, bucket seats, tachometers and flashy trim pieces.

The mix of Pontiac exterior styling on an economical Chevrolet chassis and drivetrain at a price point marginally higher than Chevrolet, was a huge marketing success for GM of Canada. For decades, full-size Pontiacs took third place behind Chevrolet and Ford in sales, typically 70,000 plus units annually. In contrast, heavier and bulkier American Pontiacs, with far higher sticker prices and higher operating costs due to large-displacement V8s requiring high-octane fuel, would have little appeal in the Canadian marketplace for a number of reasons: a population base one tenth the size of the U.S., a less stratified society with lower disposable incomes, more prudent spending and savings sensibilities, and higher taxes and gasoline prices. On the manufacturing side, maintaining unique part availability for a low-sales vehicle along with import-export tariffs and barriers between the U.S. and Canada would make the sale of American Pontiacs unprofitable in Canada.

In 1977, GM downsized its full-sized lineup. Pontiac continued with the Catalina and Bonneville nameplates it had used since 1973, but the cars failed to manage the sales volume of their divisional siblings and were dropped completely in 1981. However, the Bonneville name was then simply switched to the smaller G-body Pontiac (the cousin of the Chevrolet Malibu, Oldsmobile Cutlass, and Buick Regal) for 1982. Previously, those cars had been sold as the LeMans, but sales were poor and GM decided to swap nameplates on the grounds that Bonneville carried higher name recognition among customers.

With the recession of 1979–82 lifting and gas prices beginning to drop, sales of larger cars began to pick up and so Pontiac dealers began demanding the return of the full-sized B-body line. However, the U.S. assembly plants used for the Catalina/Bonneville had been converted over to other uses, thus GM had to now source Pontiac B-bodies from Canada, where the line had not been discontinued.

Even though the re-sized Bonneville was also sold in Canada, the full-size Parisienne continued for 1982, although its distinct Pontiac front- and rear-end treatments and interiors were largely replaced with Chevrolet components (described in detail below). At the request of US Pontiac dealerships who still wanted a full-size rear wheel drive car to replace the lost U.S. market share and gain back traditional Pontiac customers who longed for a large rear wheel drive car, the Parisienne was imported from Oshawa, Ontario, Canada and sold in the United States beginning in the 1983 model year, retaining the model name "Parisienne" and specs from the Canadian original. Externally, it was a rebadged Chevrolet Impala (1983-84 models (and 1982 in Canada) had the Impala rear taillight panel fitted with Pontiac-spec taillight lenses, whereas the nose was borrowed from the Chevrolet Caprice fitted with a Pontiac grille). The 1985 and 1986 models resumed use of the rear-end styling from the 1980 to 1981 Bonneville. Two Parisienne ranges were sold: a base model (similar to the former Catalina and the then-current Oldsmobile Delta 88 Royale) in four-door sedan and Safari station wagon form, and a more-luxurious Brougham four-door sedan (with velour upholstery that featured loose-pillow fitted seats). The two-door version of the 1977-81 B-bodies did not return to the US market, although it persisted in Canada through 1983.

== First generation: 1959-60 ==
First generation
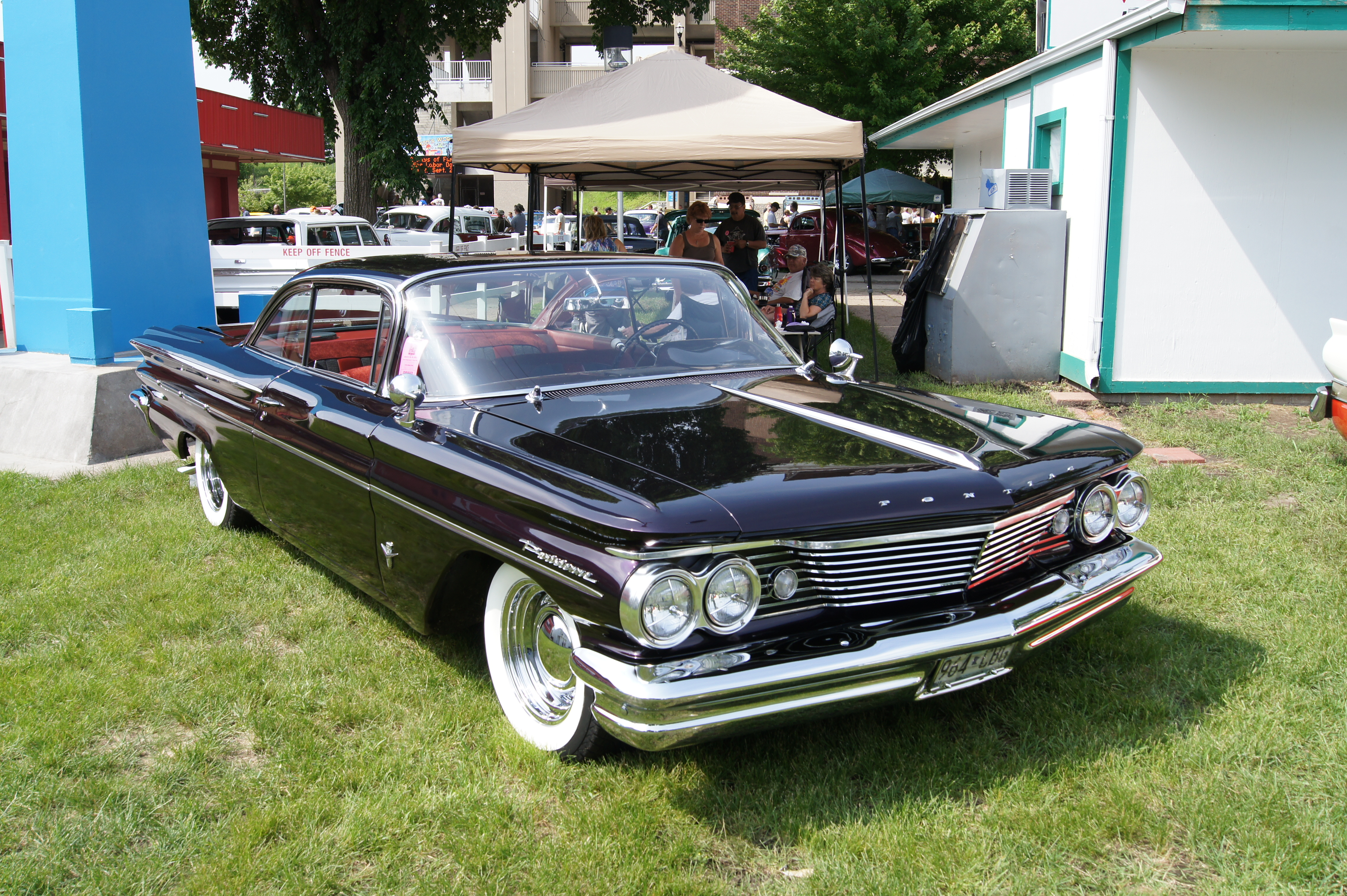
- 1960 Pontiac Parisienne

Overview
- Model years: 1959–1960

Body and chassis
- Body style: 2-door convertible 2-door coupe 4-door sedan 4-door convertible 4-door station wagon

Powertrain
- Engine: 261 cu in (4.3 L) I6; 283 cu in (4.6 L) V8; 348 cu in (5.7 L) V8
- Transmission: 2-speed automatic 3-speed automatic 3-speed manual 4-speed manual

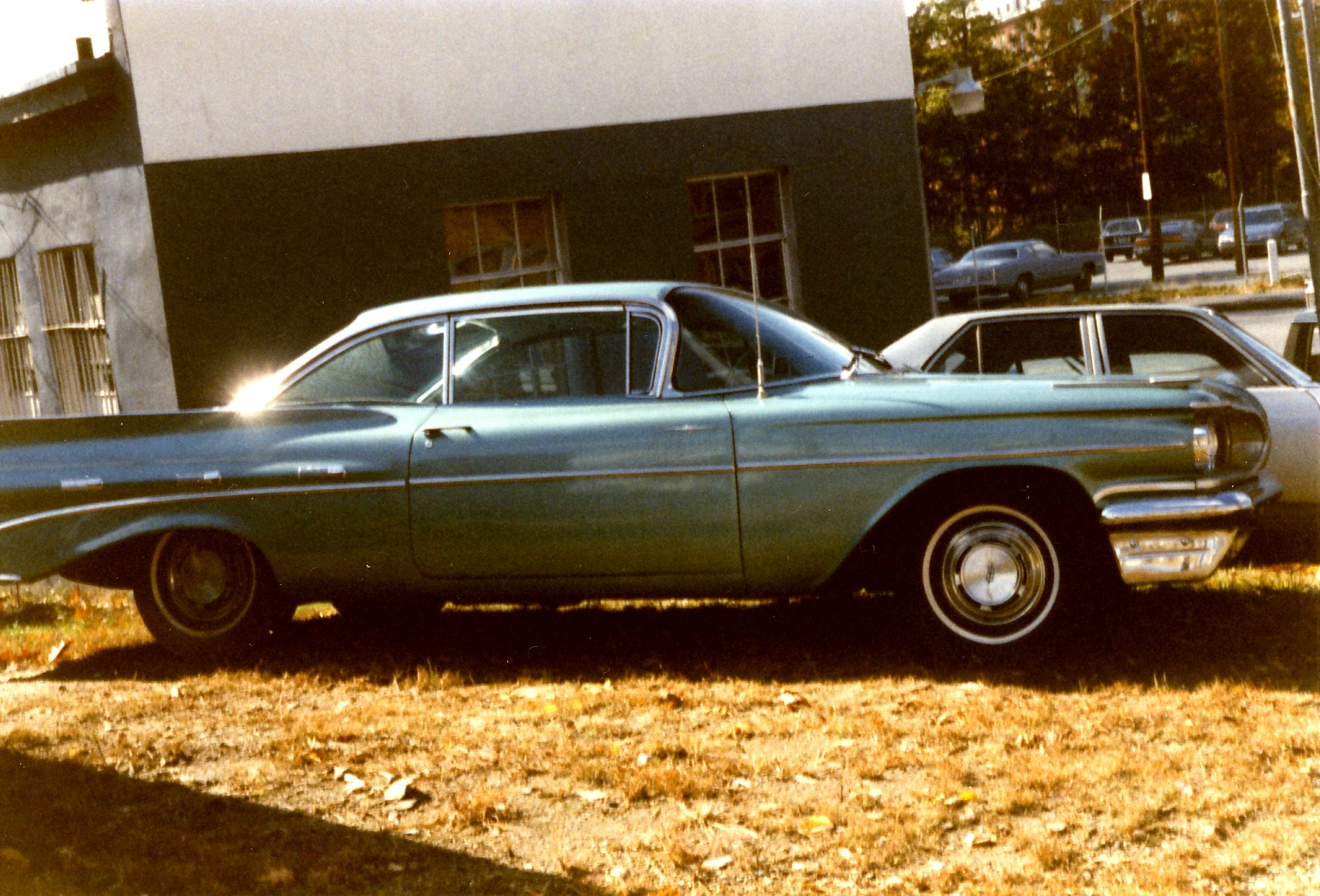
1959 Pontiac Parisienne Sport Coupe

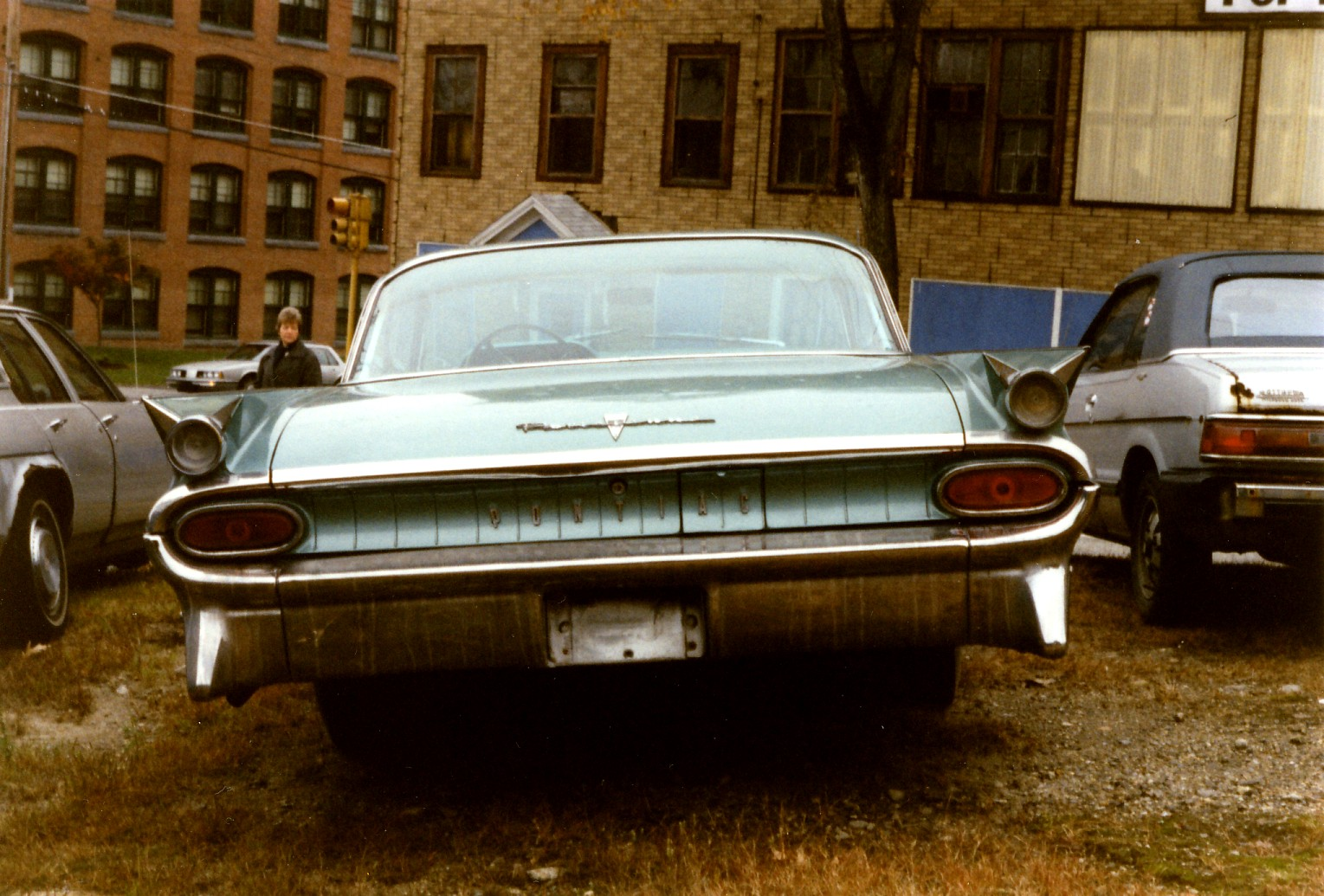
1959 Pontiac Parisienne Sport Coupe rear view

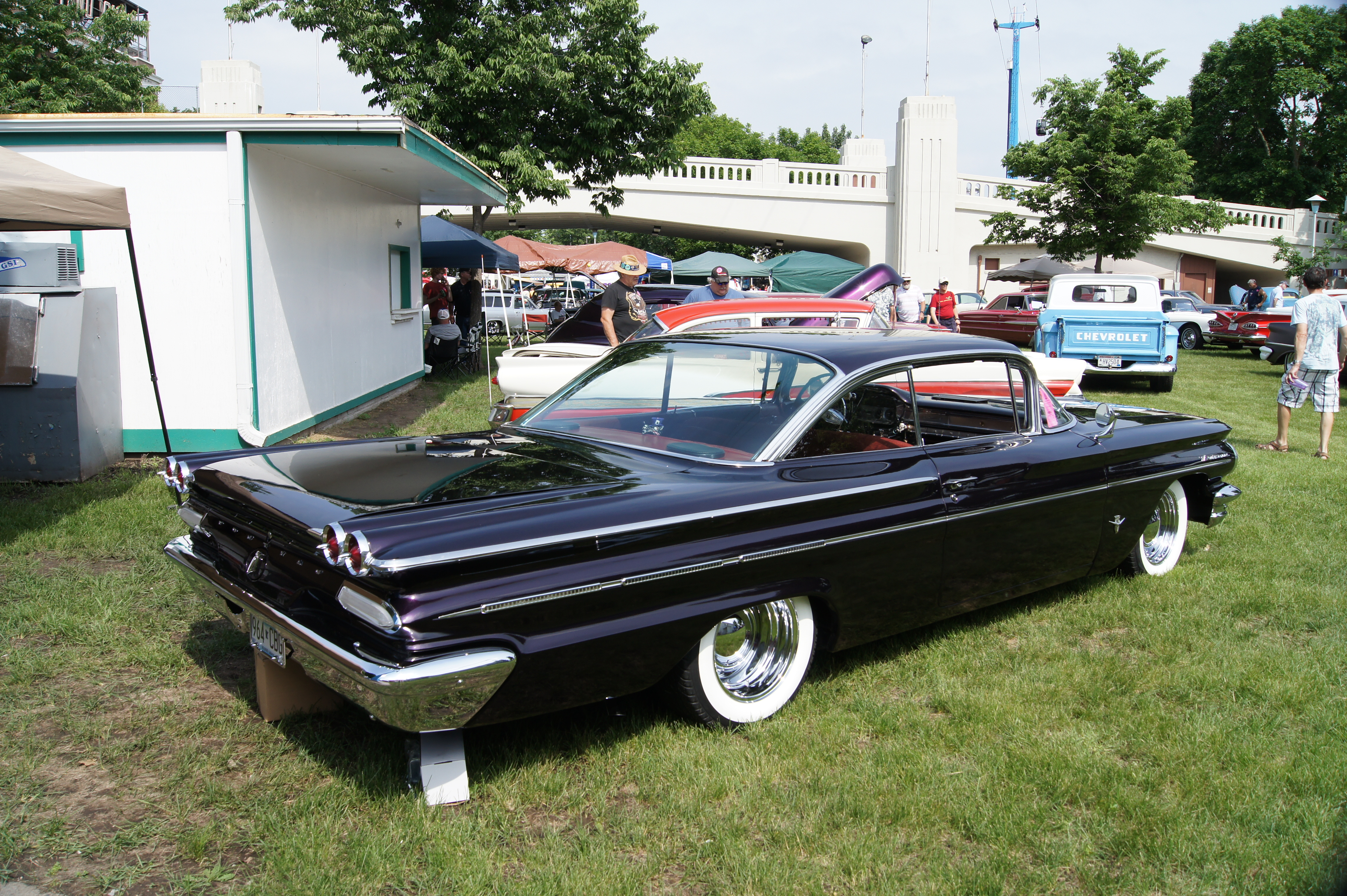
1960 Pontiac Parisienne rear view

== Second generation: 1961–1964 ==
Second generation
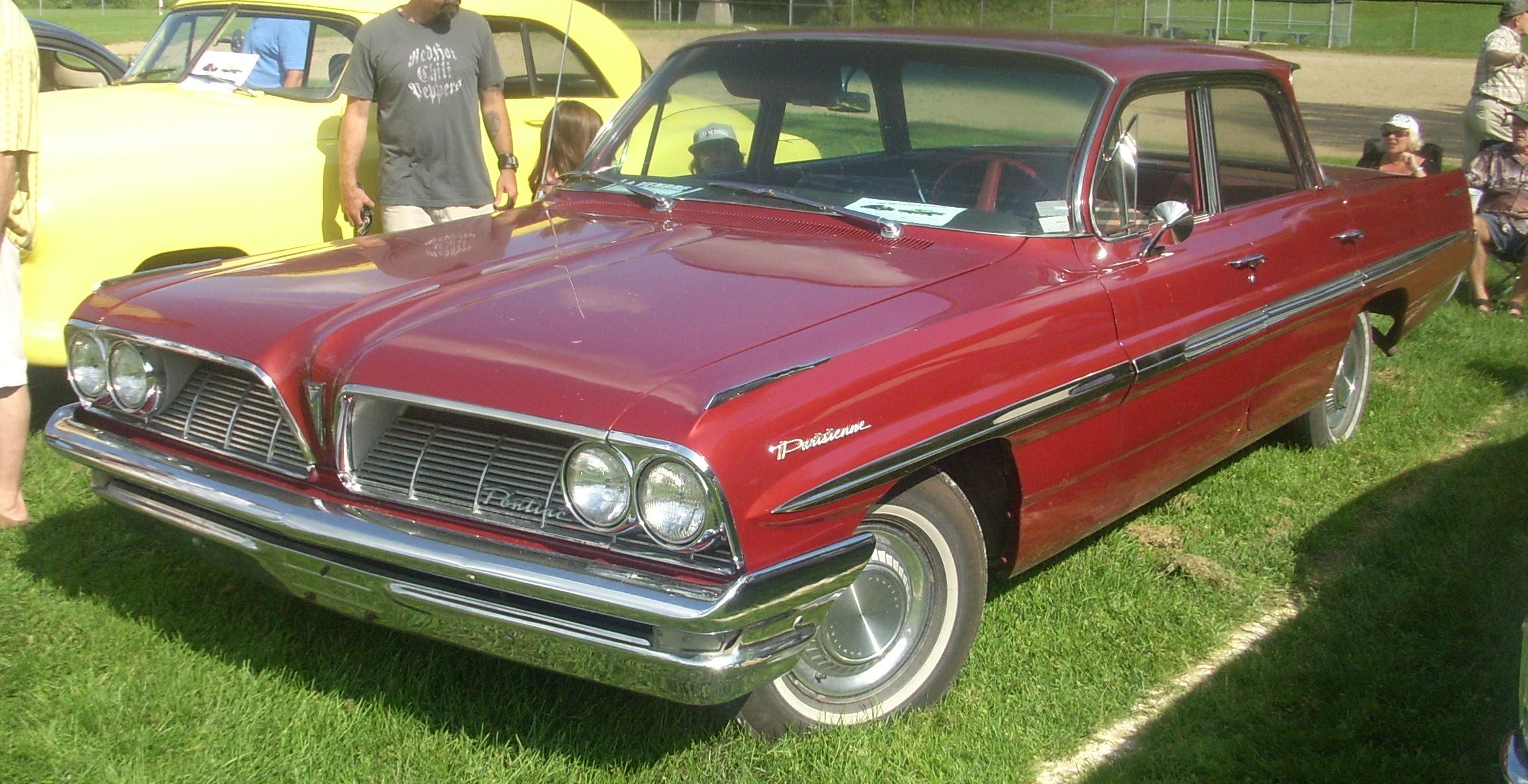
- 1961 Pontiac Parisienne sedan

Overview
- Model years: 1961–1964
- Assembly: Oshawa Car Assembly, Oshawa, Ontario Canada, GM New Zealand, Petone, Wellington New Zealand, GM Holden, Adelaide Australia

Body and chassis
- Body style: 2-door convertible 2-door coupe 4-door sedan 4-door hardtop 4-door station wagon
- Platform: B-body
- Related: Buick LeSabre; Chevrolet Bel Air; Chevrolet Impala; Pontiac Catalina/Laurentian

Powertrain
- Engine: 261 cu in (4.3 L) I6; 230 cu in (3.8 L) I6; 283 cu in (4.6 L) V8; 327 cu in (5.4 L) V8; 348 cu in (5.7 L) V8; 409 cu in (6.7 L) V8
- Transmission: 2-speed automatic 3-speed automatic 3-speed manual 4-speed manual

Dimensions
- Wheelbase: 119.0 in (3,023 mm)

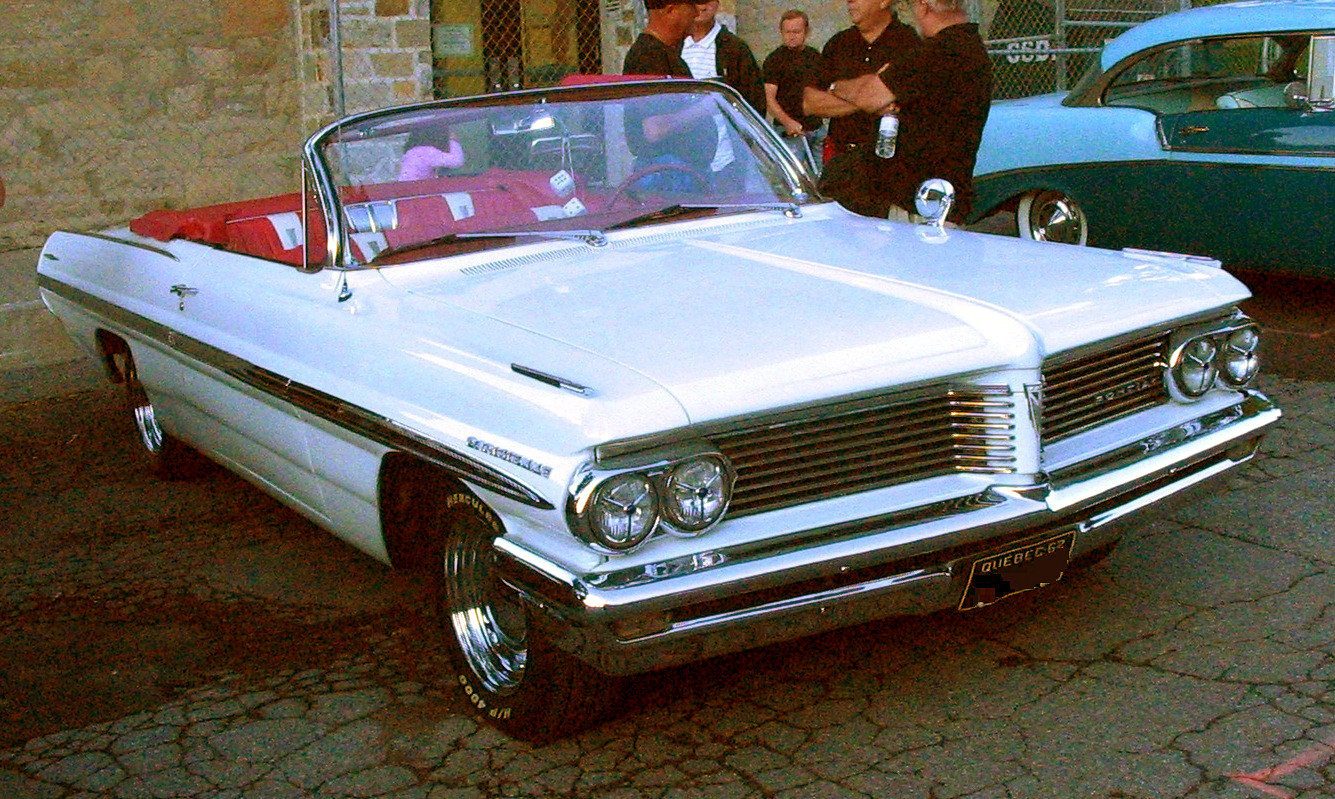
1962 Pontiac Parisienne convertible

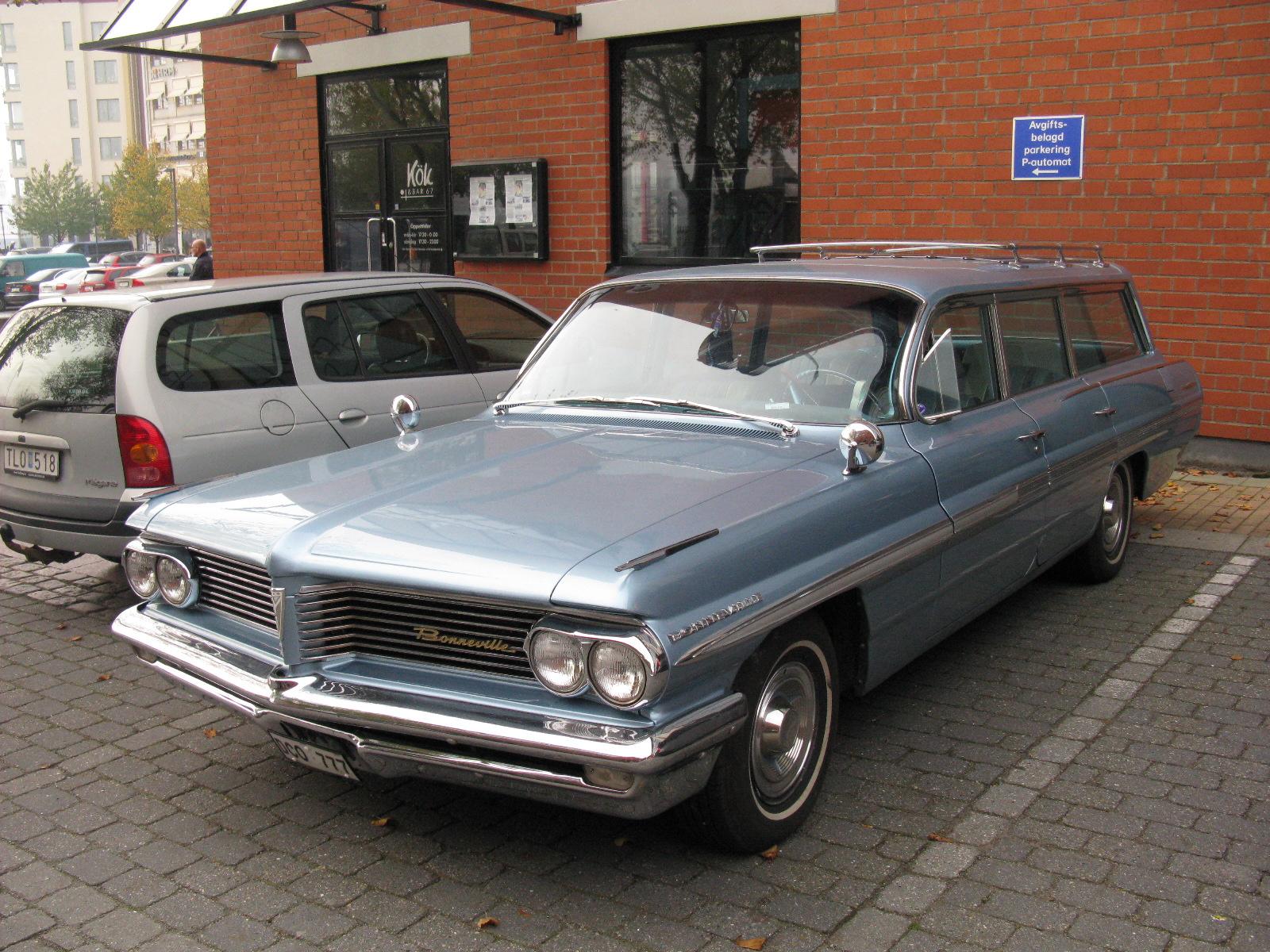
1962 Pontiac Parisienne Safari station wagon

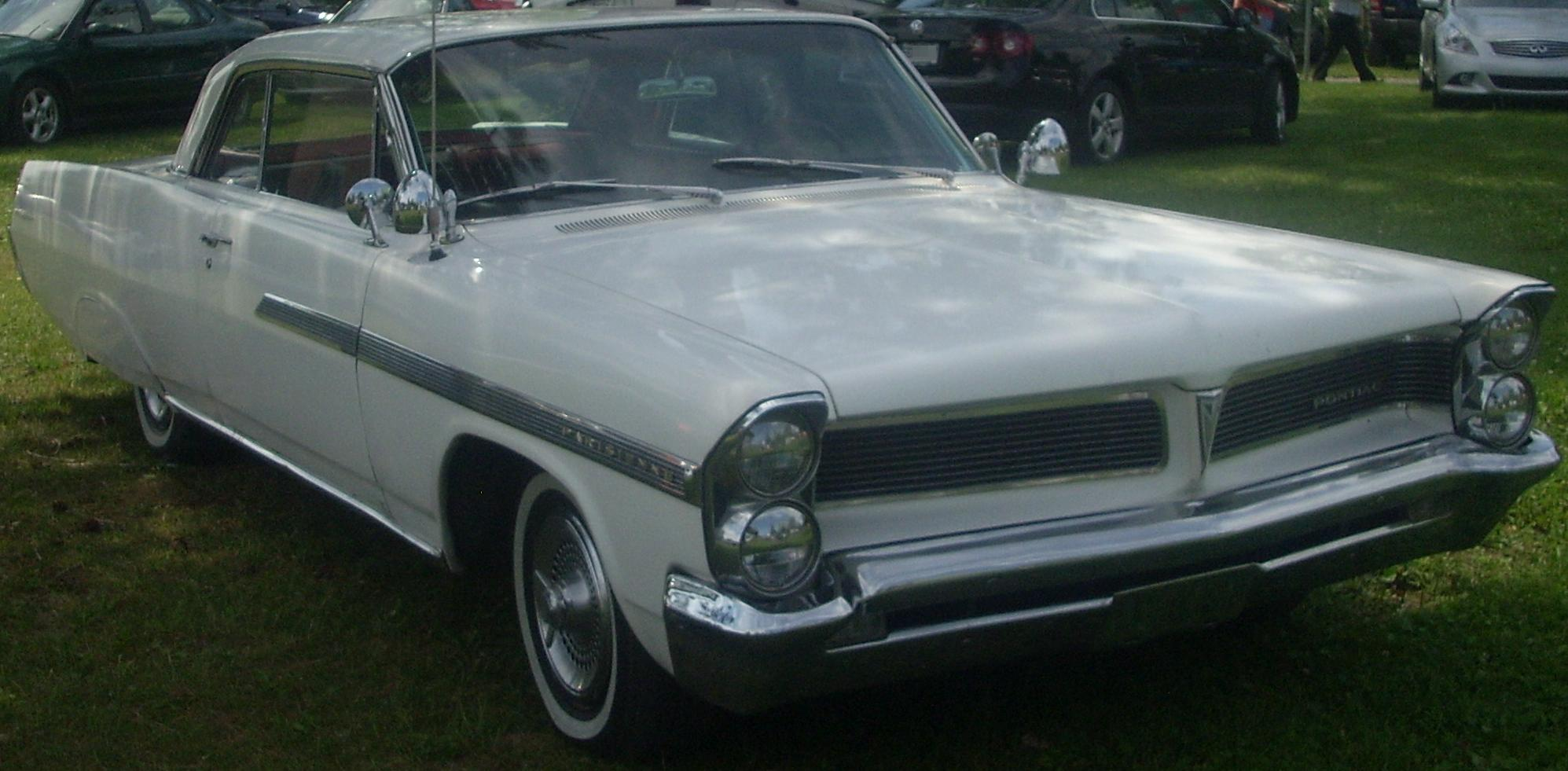
1963 Pontiac Parisienne Sport Coupe. Side trim resembles U.S. market Bonneville.

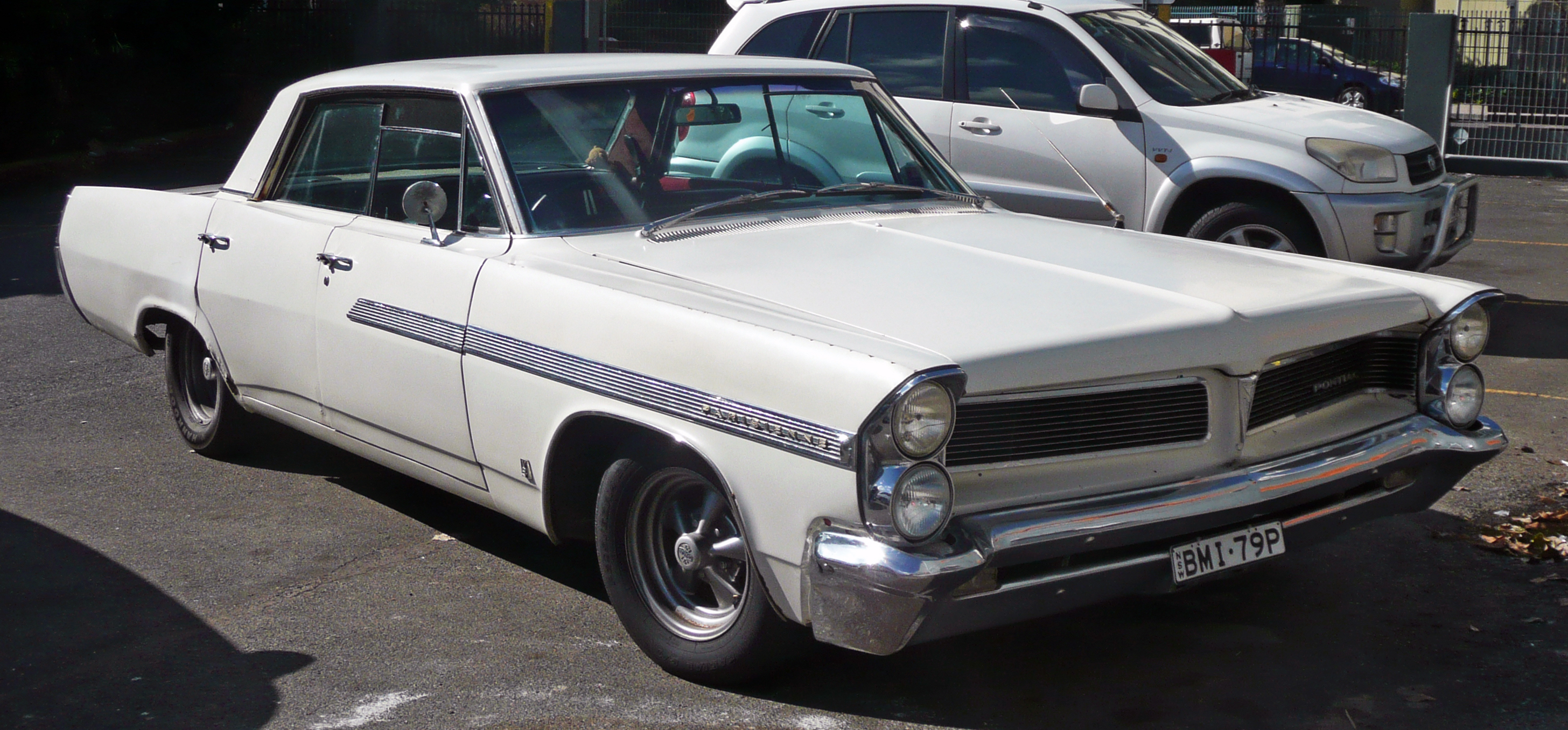
1963 Pontiac Parisienne Sport Sedan (Australia). This car features right-hand drive.

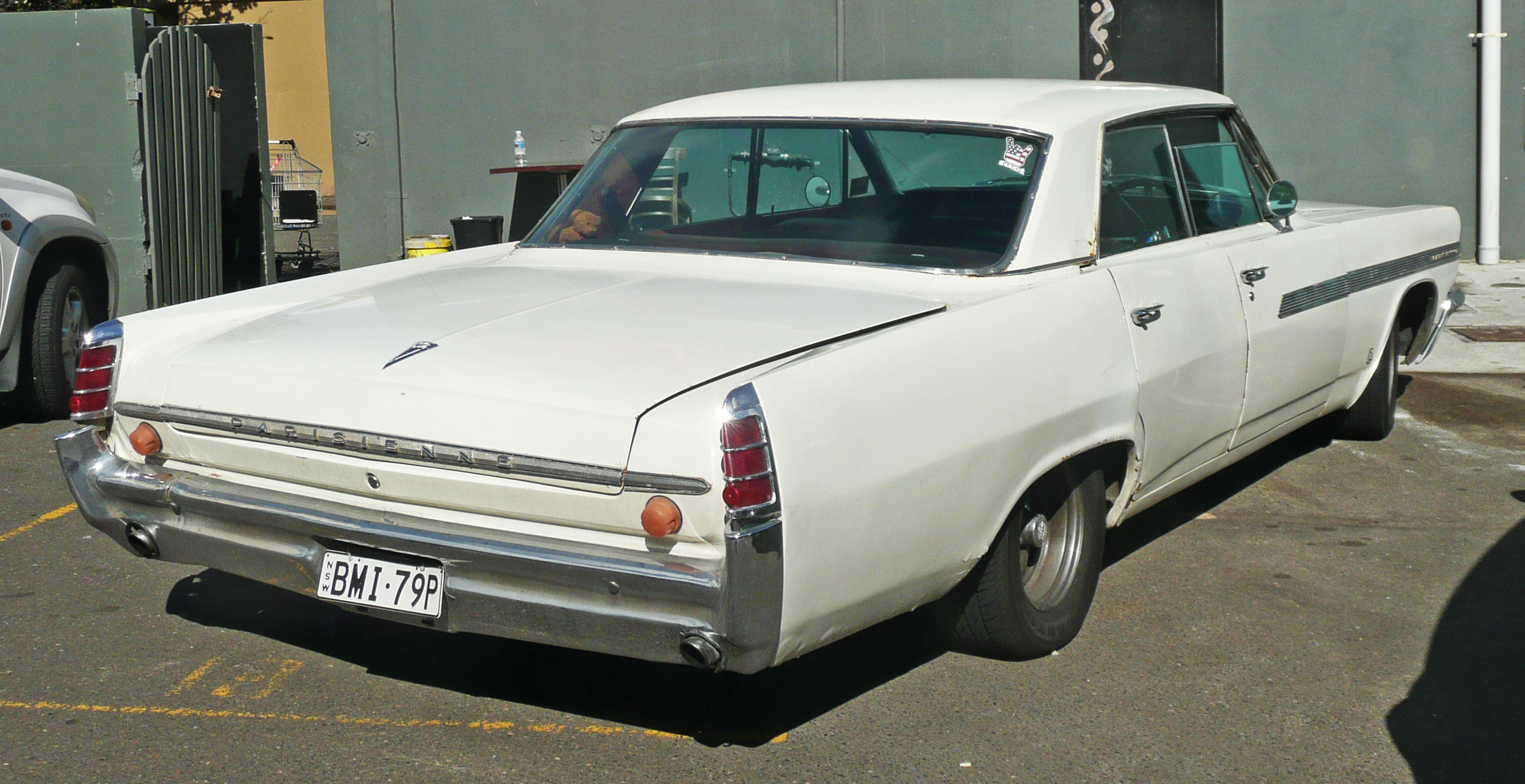
1963 Pontiac Parisienne Sport Sedan (Australia). Rear trim is similar to U.S. Catalina, while front trim is close to the Bonneville. Note amber turn lenses and right-hand drive to conform to Australian safety standards.

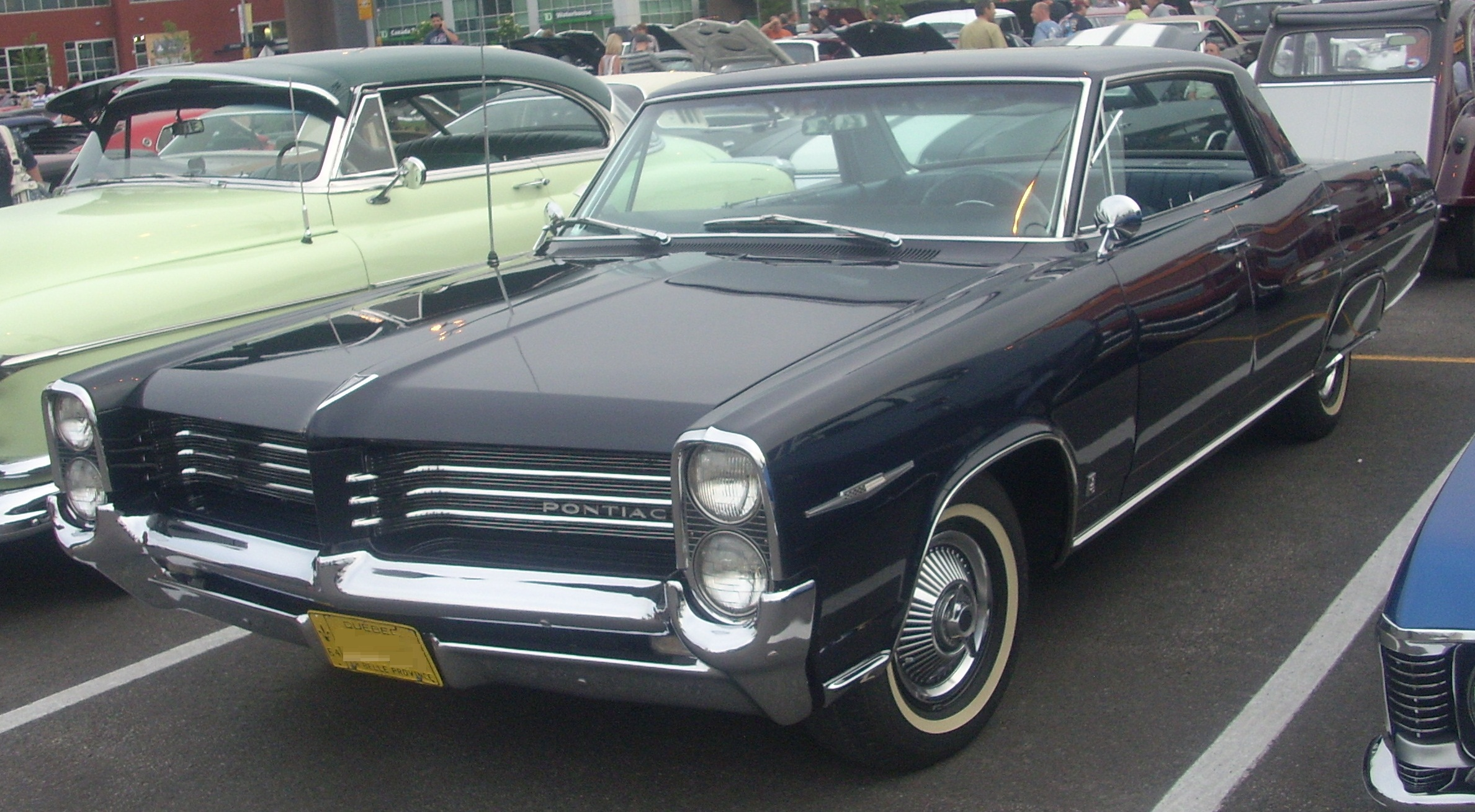
1964 Pontiac Parisienne Sport Sedan. Note Chevrolet type parallel wipers; U.S. market Pontiacs had "clapper" windshield wipers.

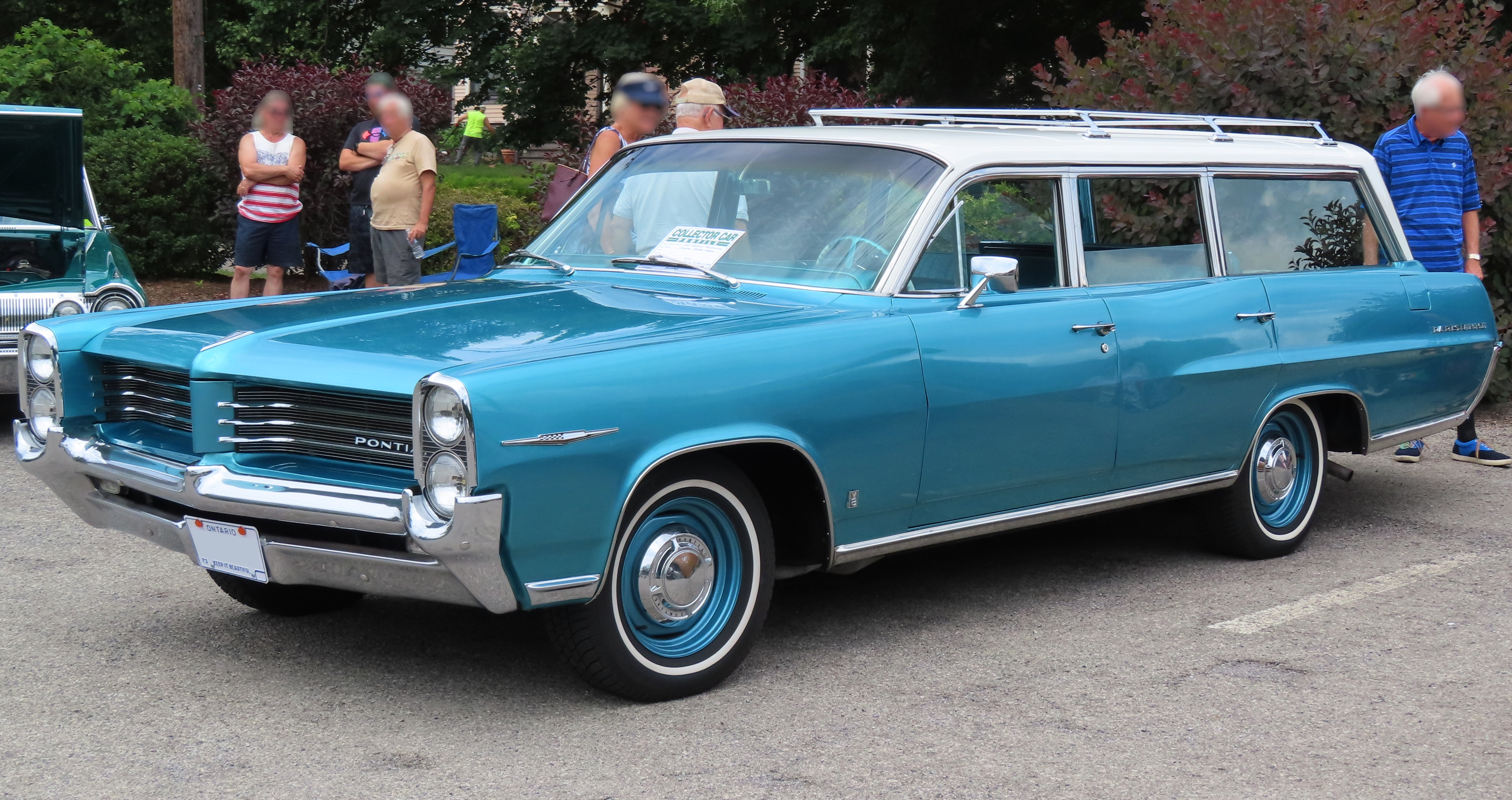
1964 Pontiac Parisienne Safari

== Third generation: 1965–1970 ==
Third generation
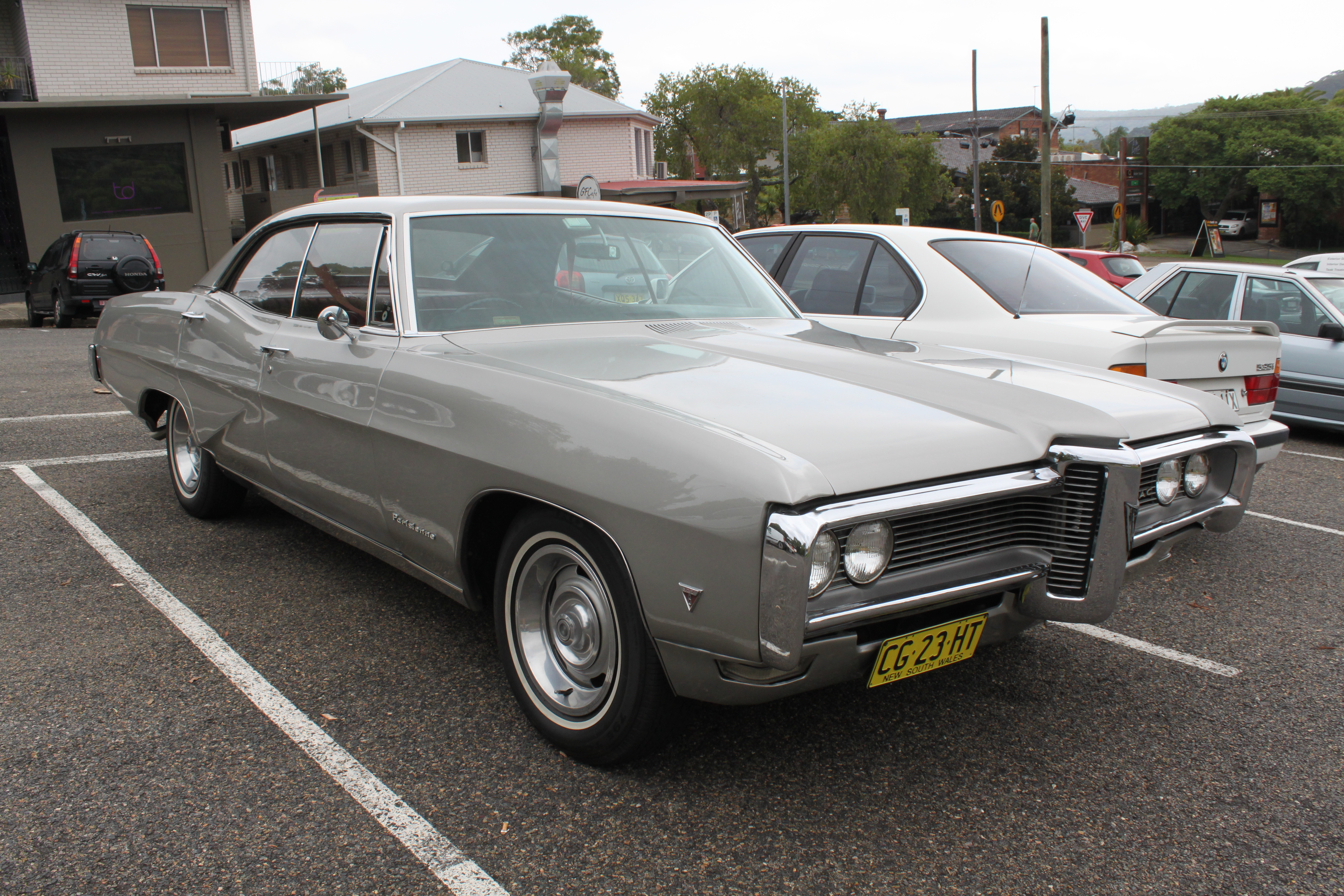
- 1968 Pontiac Parisienne Sedan

Overview
- Model years: 1965–1970
- Assembly: Oshawa Car Assembly, Oshawa, Ontario Canada, GM New Zealand, Petone, Wellington New Zealand (until 1969), GM Holden, Dandenong Australia (until 1969), General Motors South Africa, Port Elizabeth South Africa (until 1970)

Body and chassis
- Body style: 2-door convertible 2-door coupe 4-door sedan 4-door hardtop 4-door station wagon
- Platform: B-body
- Related: Buick LeSabre; Chevrolet Bel Air; Chevrolet Caprice; Chevrolet Impala; Pontiac Catalina/Laurentian

Powertrain
- Engine: 283 cu in (4.6 L) V8; 327 cu in (5.4 L) V8; 350 cu in (5.7 L) V8; 396 cu in (6.5 L) V8; 427 cu in (7.0 L) V8; 454 cu in (7.4 L) V8 (replaced 427 in 1970)
- Transmission: 2-speed automatic 3-speed automatic 3-speed manual 4-speed manual

Dimensions
- Wheelbase: 119.0 in (3,023 mm)

In 1965 Pontiac Parisienne grille appeared as the Bonneville grille, with the exception of the Custom Sport grille which was taken from US 1965 Pontiac Grand Prix. Although the powertrain offerings paralleled the Chevrolet full size powertrain lineup, 1965 was an exception. The Canadian full size Pontiacs never came with a 396 in 1965 but continued with the 409 as an optional engine until the 1966 model year was introduced. 1967 brought new styling including new grilles. There were also new safety features, such as a collapsible steering column and dual braking system.

The 1968 model was the last model for right-hand-drive assembly in those markets as supplied by the Oshawa plant, following General Motors in the United States decision to cease all RHD exports in 1968. Nevertheless, the 1968 model continued to be locally assembled for a further year in Australia and for two more years in South Africa.

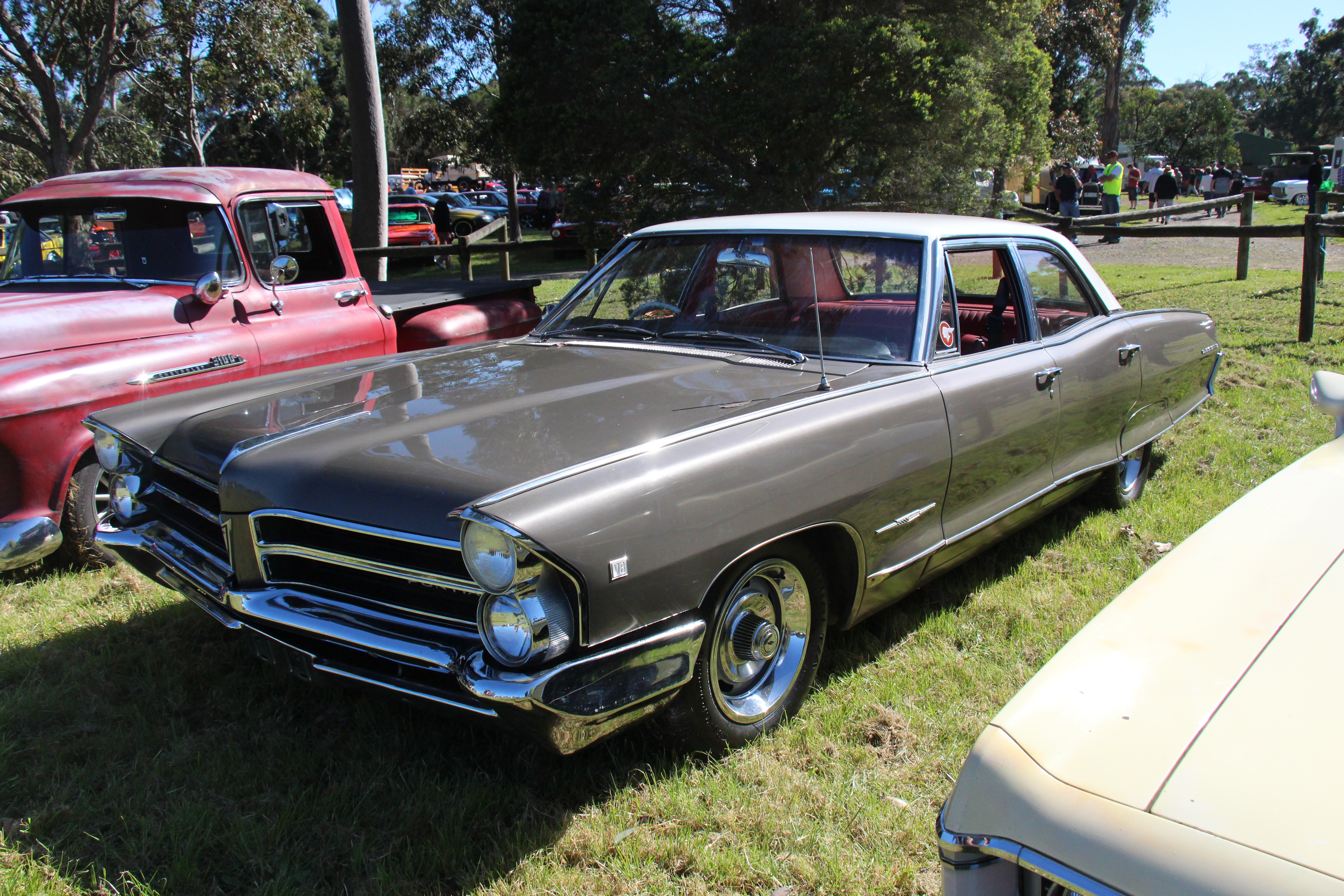
1965 Pontiac Parisienne 4-door Sedan
(with non-standard wheels)

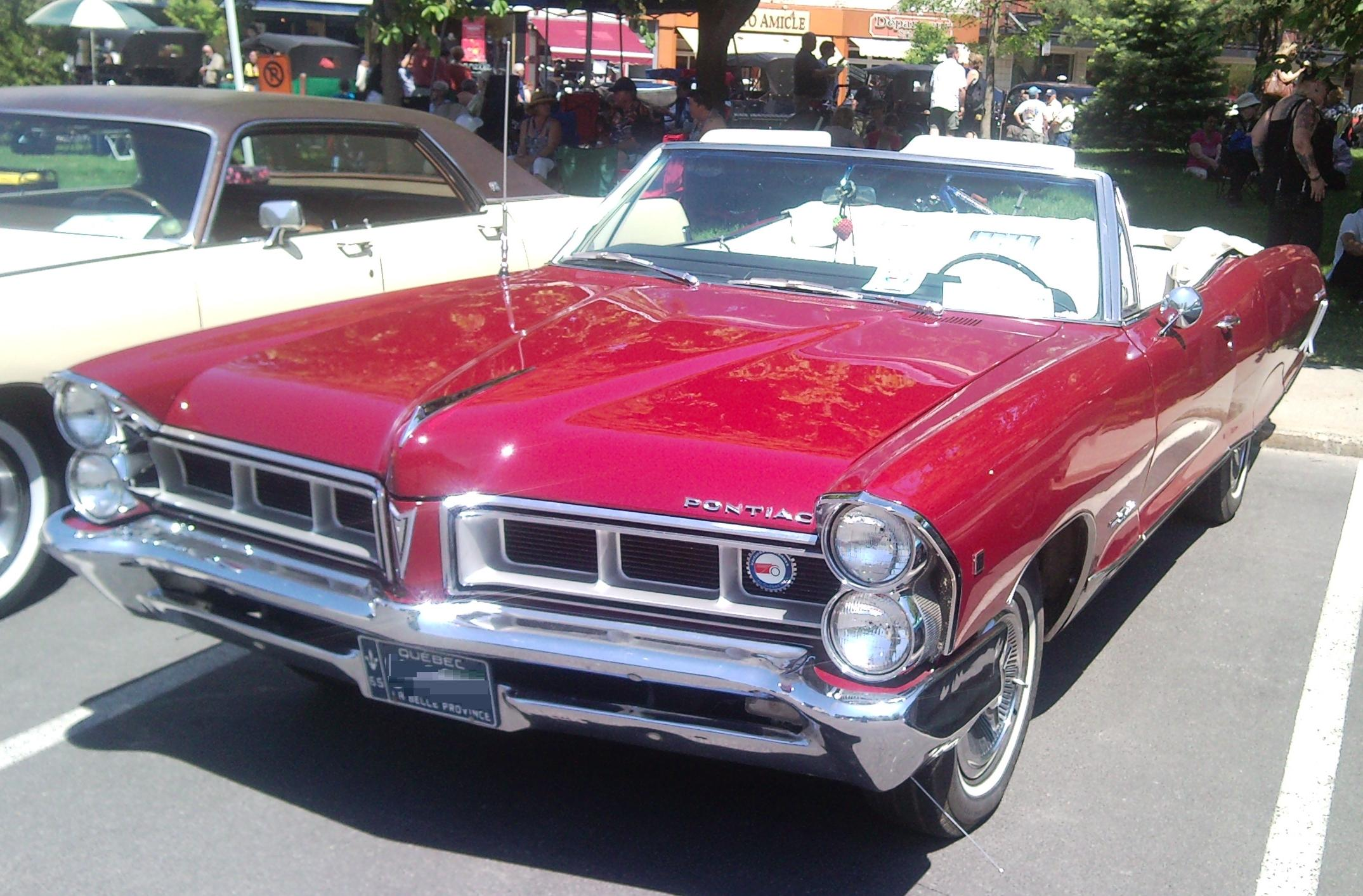
1965 Pontiac Parisienne Custom Sport Convertible

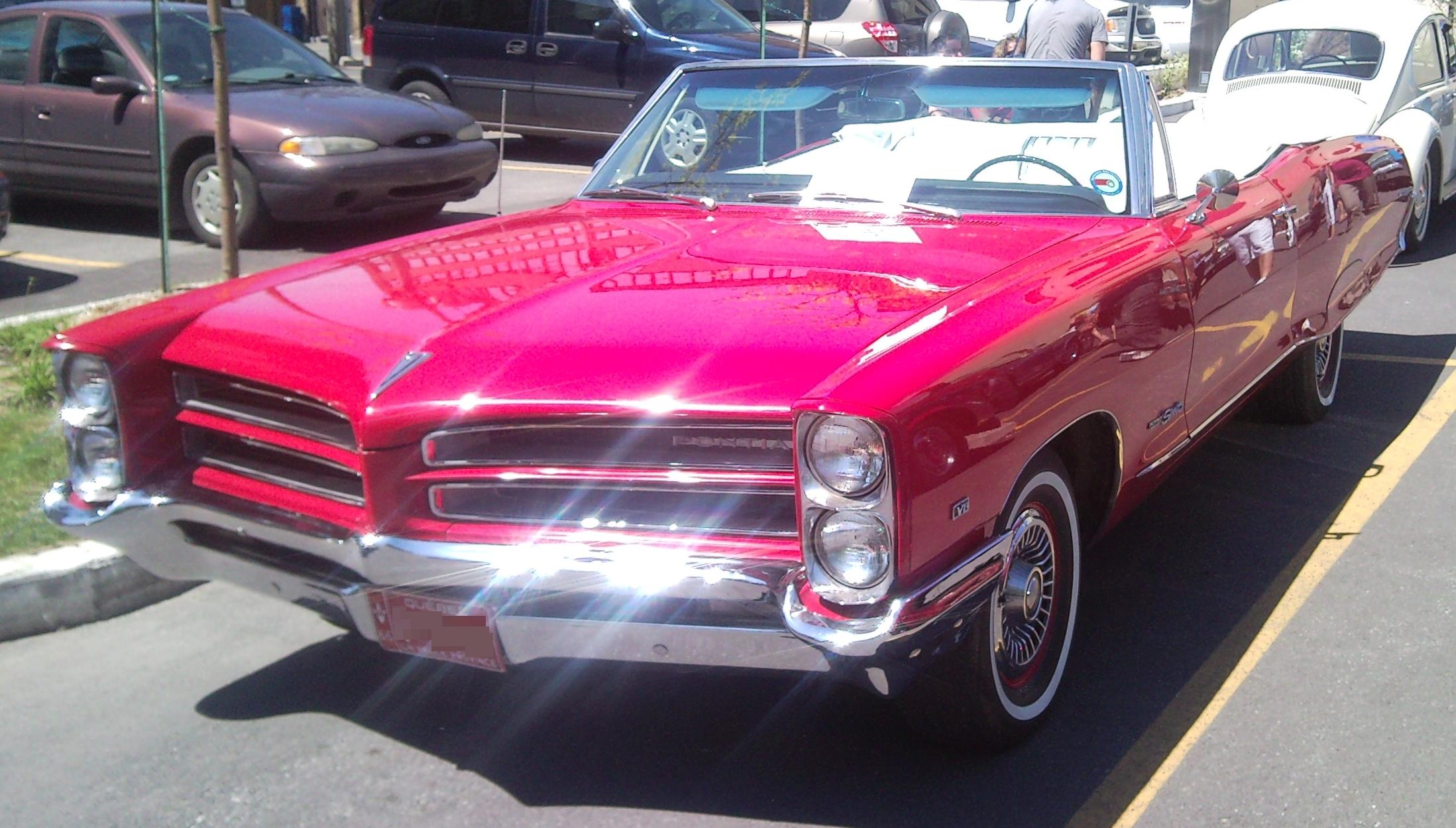
1966 Pontiac Parisienne Convertible

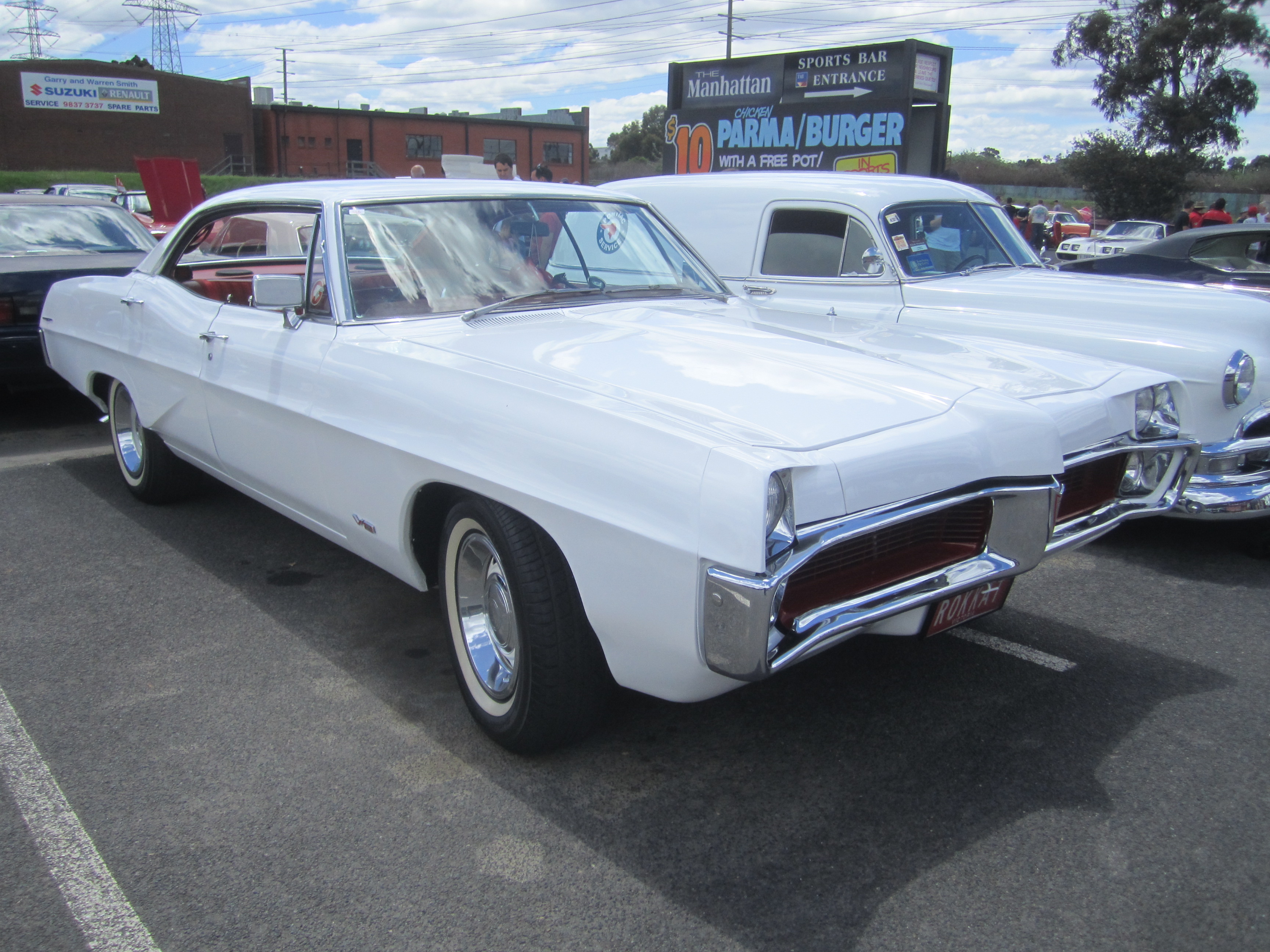
1967 Pontiac Parisienne Sport Sedan

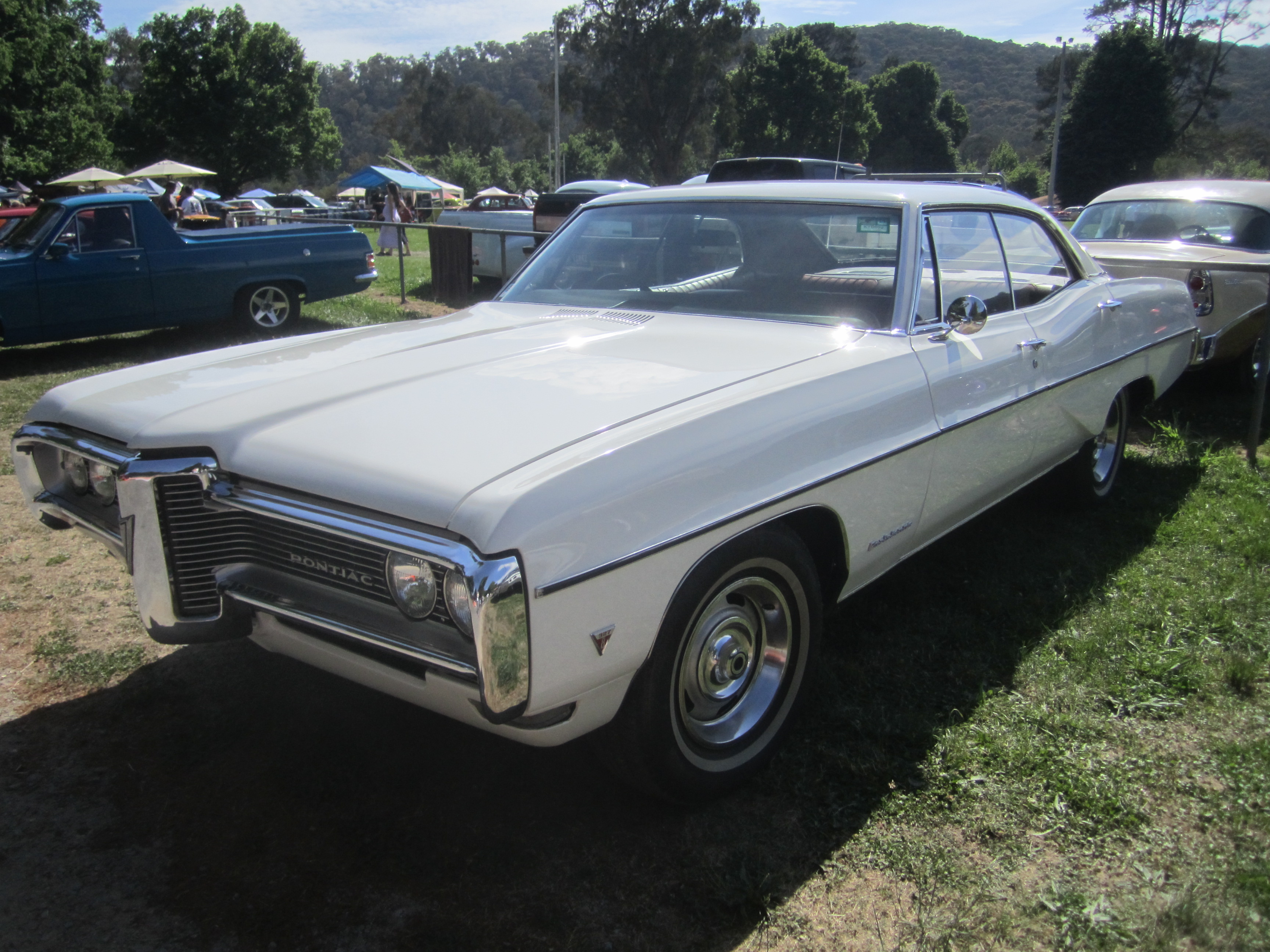
1968 Pontiac Parisienne Sport Sedan

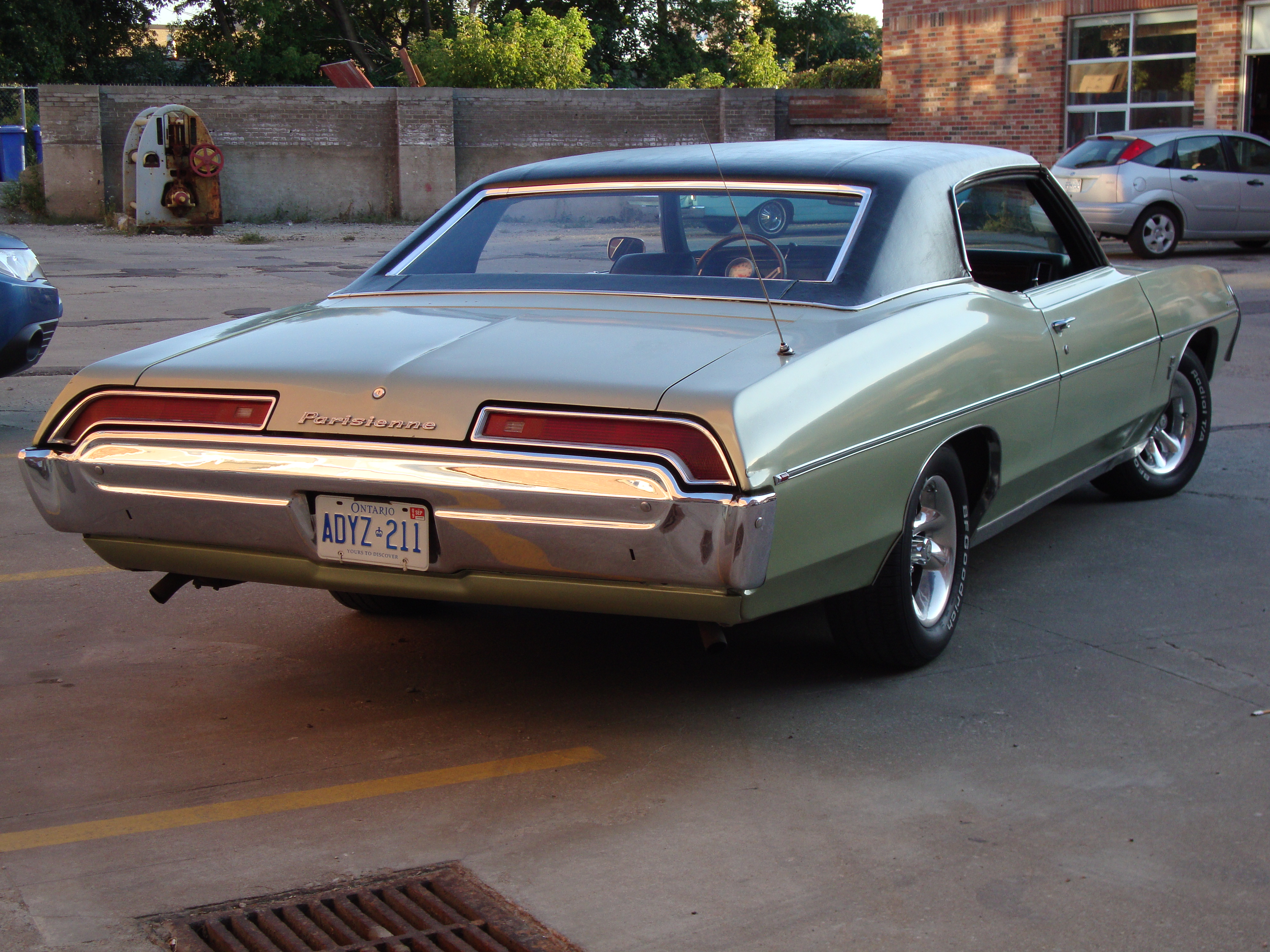
1969 Pontiac Parisienne 2-door hardtop (rear)

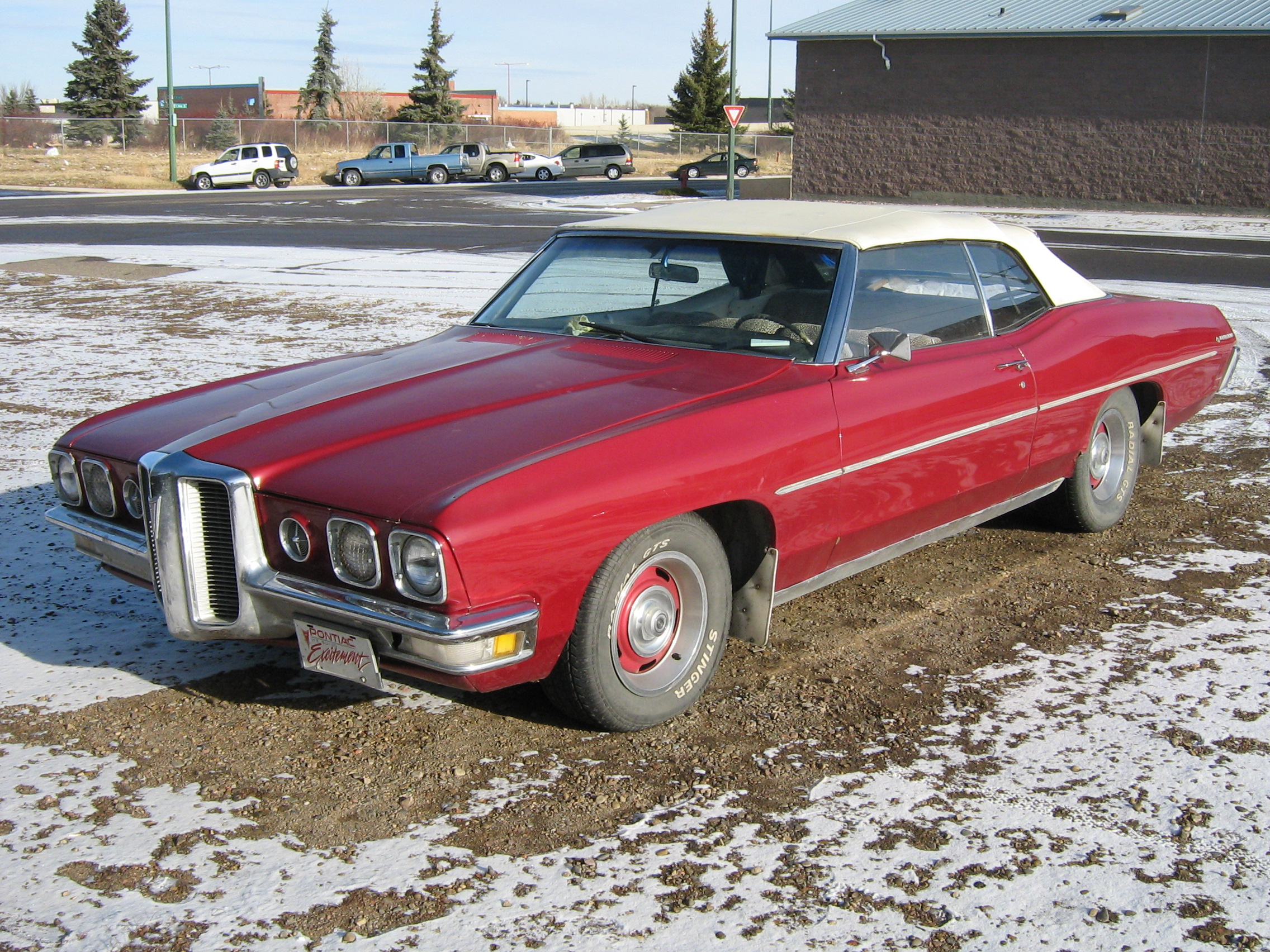
1970 Pontiac Parisienne Convertible

== Fourth generation: 1971–1976 ==
Fourth generation
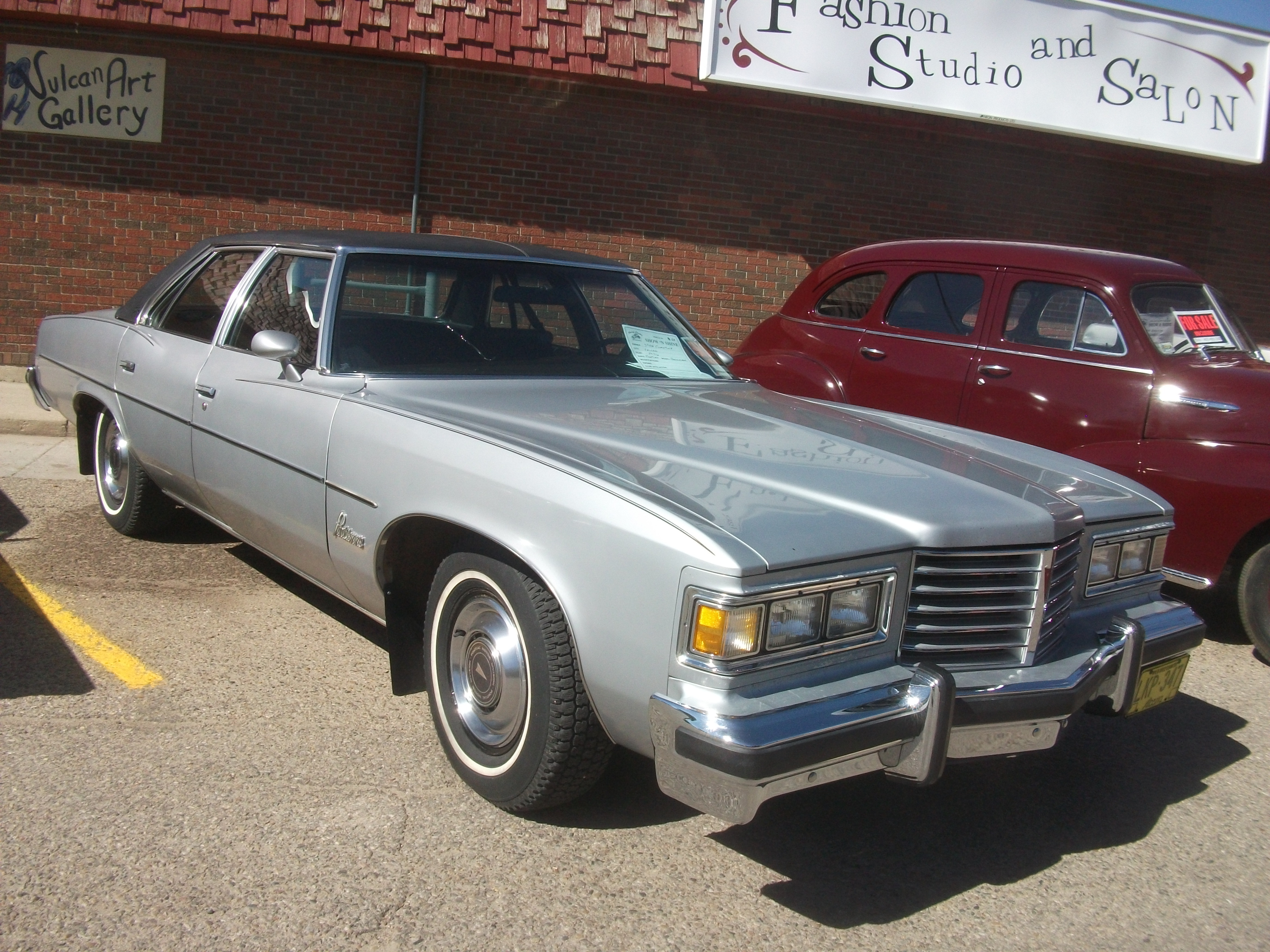
- 1976 Pontiac Parisienne Sedan

Overview
- Model years: 1971–1976

Body and chassis
- Body style: 4-door hardtop 2-door coupe 4-door sedan
- Platform: B-body
- Related: Buick LeSabre; Chevrolet Bel Air; Chevrolet Caprice; Chevrolet Impala; Oldsmobile 88; Pontiac Catalina/Laurentian

Powertrain
- Engine: 350 cu in (5.7 L) V8; 400 cu in (6.6 L) V8; 455 cu in (7.5 L) V8

Dimensions
- Wheelbase: 123.4 in (3,134 mm)

For 1971, GM's new "B" and "C" bodies were the largest ever produced. During this generation in the Parisienne, the 350 2 bbl Chevrolet engine was now the standard powerplant with a 4 bbl version and a 400 2 bbl being optional. However, the larger Chevrolet 454 engine was replaced for the first time with the same larger powerplants as U.S. market Pontiacs. Thus, the Pontiac 400 & 455 cubic-inch V8 were now offered as options on selected full size models.

The Grande Parisienne name was no longer used after 1969 and the Parisienne became the Parisienne Brougham in 1971, which was virtually the same car as the American Catalina and its 123.5 inch wheelbase. The Canadian Laurentian model continued.

In 1971 the Grand Ville and Bonneville models were introduced to Canada, with their 126-inch wheelbase, along with the Catalina model.

The Grand Ville had a front bench seat with a center armrest or an optional 60/40 divided seat with armrest. The Bonneville and Parisienne Brougham had a front bench seat without an armrest.

Starting with the 1972 model year, all V8-powered Canadian Pontiacs got the Turbo Hydra-Matic as the standard transmission. Six cylinder models (Laurentian only) got a 3-speed manual as standard.

In 1973 all full-size Pontiac models were given a 124-inch wheelbase before being downsized for the 1977 model year.

While the Bonneville remained for 1976, 1975 was the last year for the Grand Ville in both the U.S. and Canada, with the Bonneville Brougham replacing the Grand Ville in 1976.

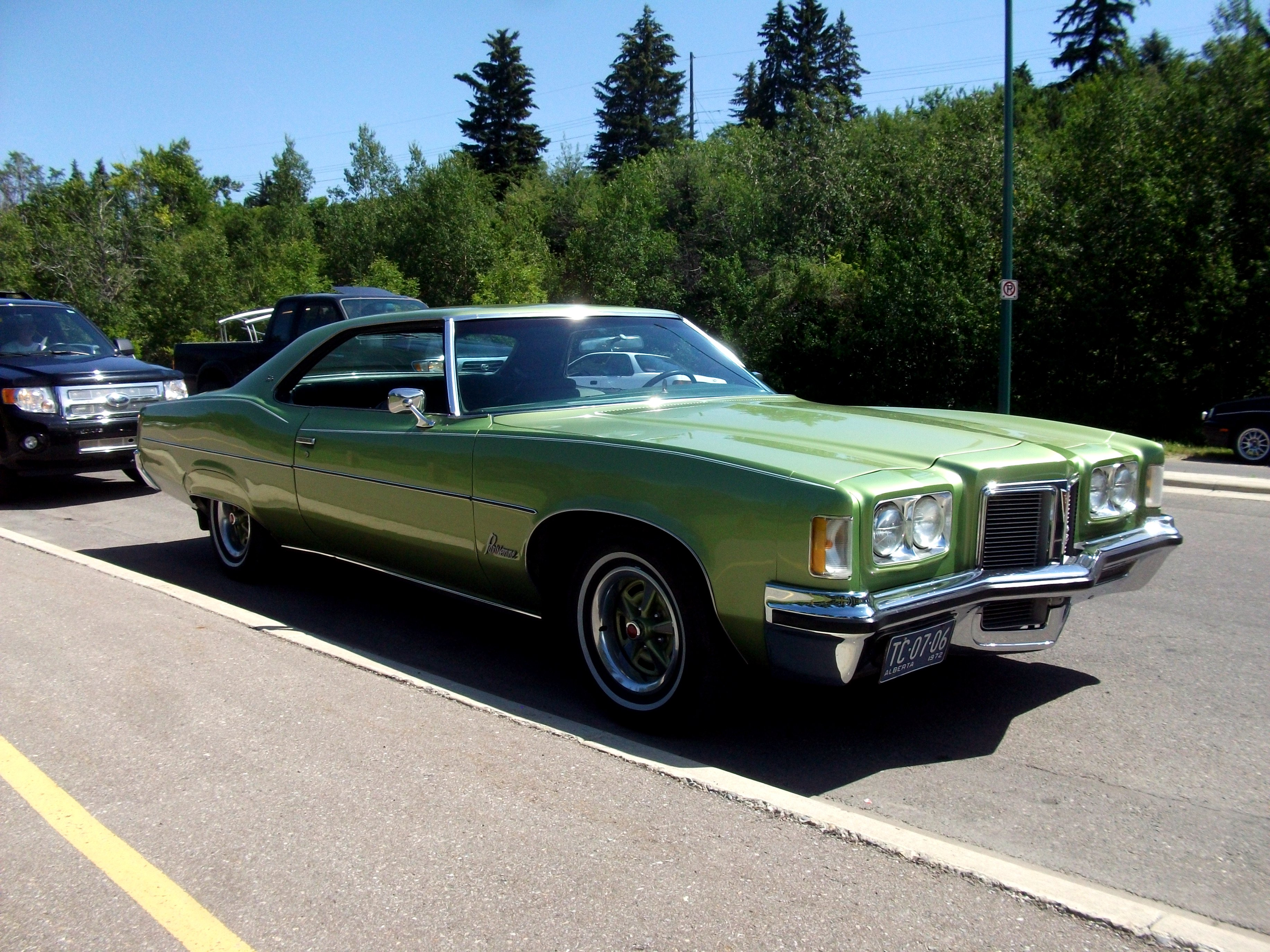
1972 Pontiac Parisienne Brougham Hardtop Coupe

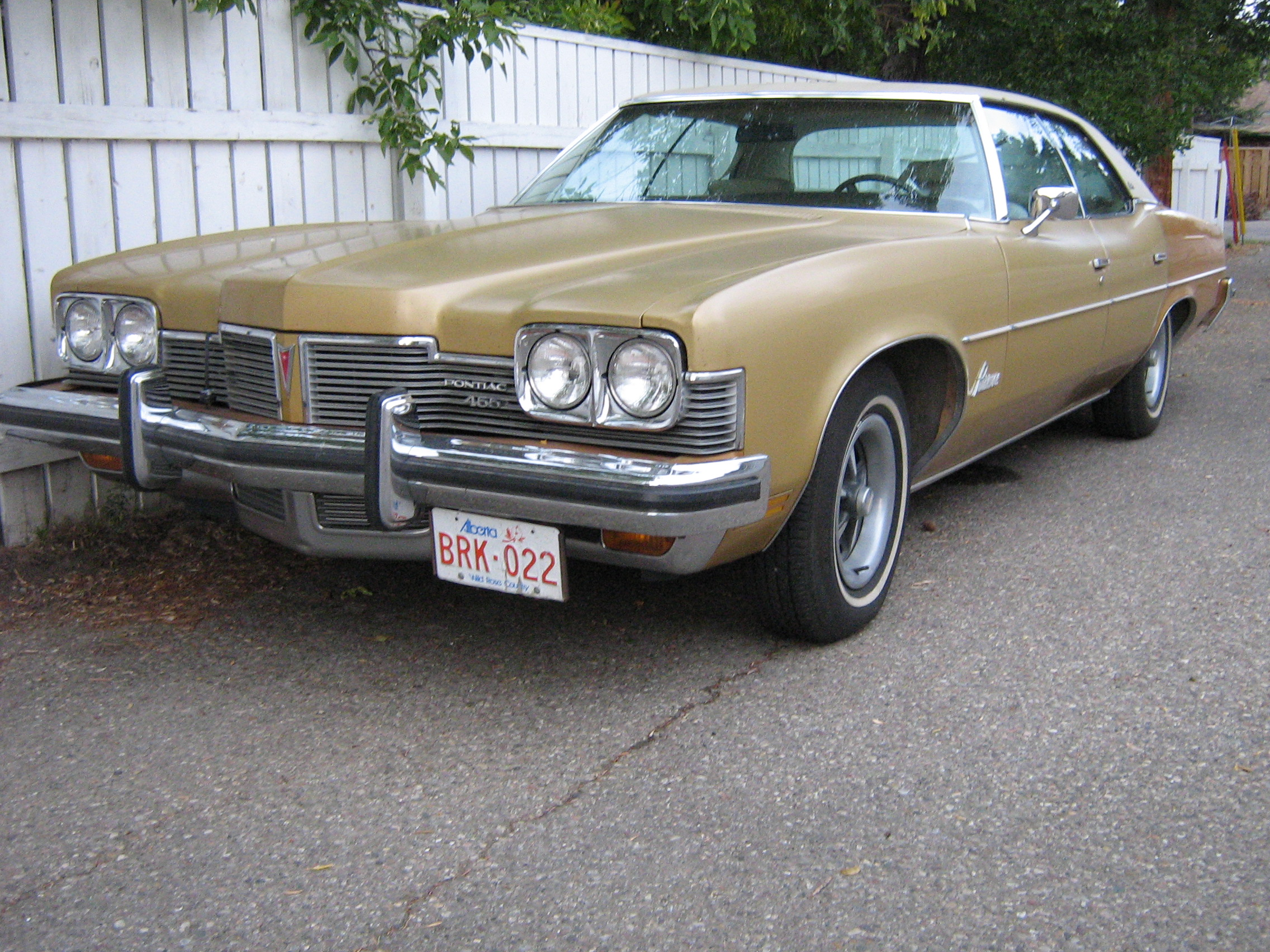
1973 Pontiac Parisienne Brougham 4-door Hardtop

== Fifth generation: 1977–1986 ==
Fifth generation
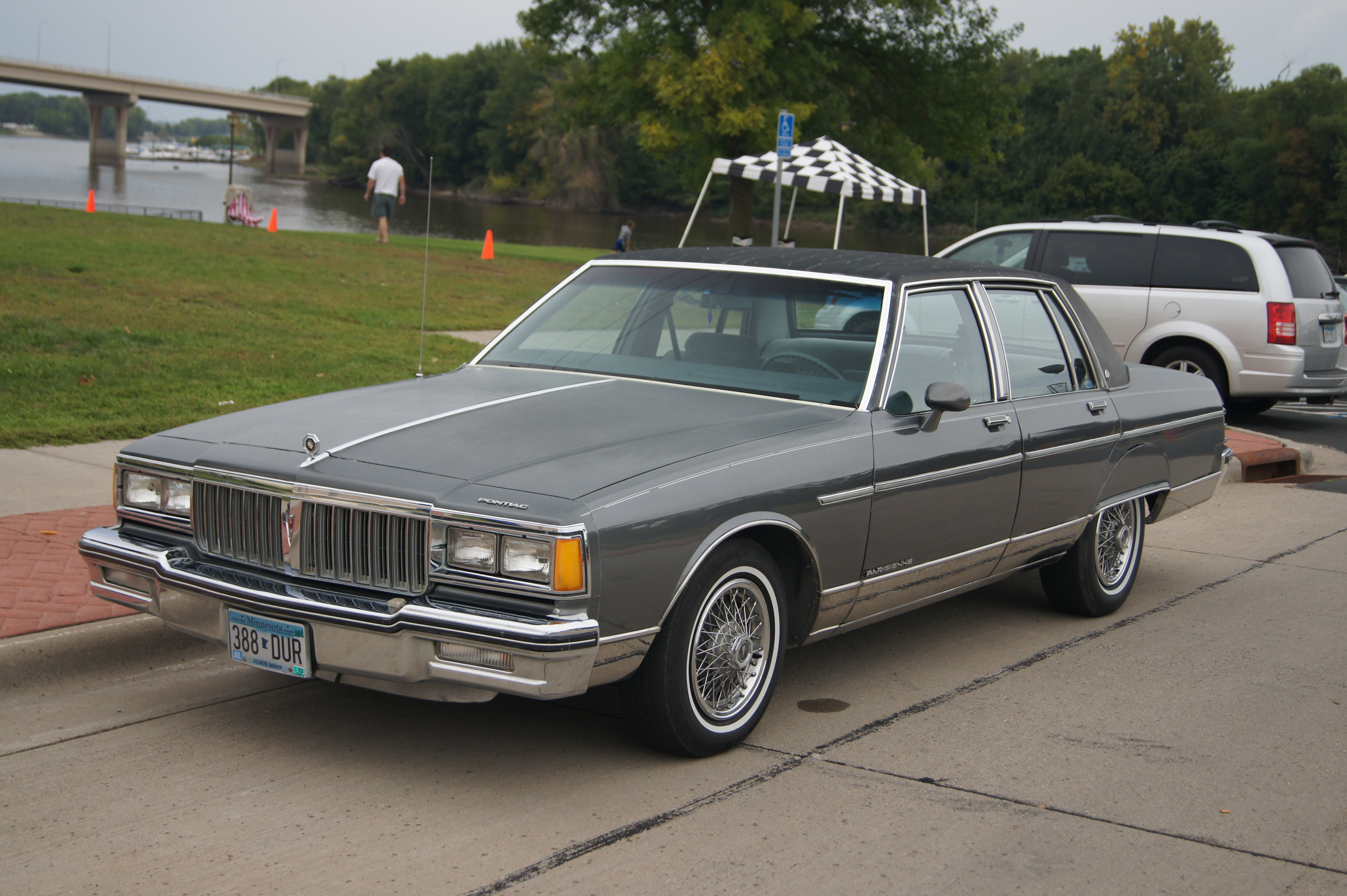
- 1985 Pontiac Parisienne Brougham sedan

Overview
- Model years: 1977–1986
- Assembly: Oshawa, Ontario, Canada; Kansas City, Kansas, United States (Fairfax Assembly)

Body and chassis
- Body style: 2-door coupe 4-door sedan 4-door station wagon
- Platform: B-body
- Related: Buick LeSabre; Chevrolet Caprice; Chevrolet Impala; Oldsmobile 88; Pontiac Catalina/Laurentian

Powertrain
- Engine: 231 cu in (3.8 L) Buick V6; 265 cu in (4.3 L) Pontiac V8; 301 cu in (4.9 L) Pontiac V8; 305 cu in (5.0 L) Chevrolet V8; 307 cu in (5.0 L) Oldsmobile V8; 350 cu in (5.7 L) Pontiac V8; 350 cu in (5.7 L) Oldsmobile Diesel V8

Dimensions
- Wheelbase: 116.0 in (2,946 mm)

For 1977 model year, the full-sized GM cars (B-platform and C-platform) were greatly downsized, losing hundreds of pounds in weight and several inches in length while retaining the similar amount of interior space. Smaller, lighter bodies allowed the smaller engines, which led to the lower fuel consumption.

The 1977–1981 Parisienne shared the same front end and taillight design with Bonnevilles sold in the United States. When the full-size GM cars were revised in 1980, Parisienne sedan and coupe gained the formal roof with near-vertical rear windscreen. The revised grille became narrower in width, and the front turn signal indicators were moved from the bumpers to the positions between main and high beam headlights. The cornering lamp was moved higher from the lower chrome trim to the body. The taillights were revised to be more vertical and had deeper inserts between the chrome trims.

When General Motors revised the G-platform in 1982, Pontiac in the United States renamed LeMans as Bonneville Model G, moving the nameplate down from the full-size to mid-size car. The full-size B-platform car was renamed as Parisienne, making it the first time that Parisienne was sold in the United States.

For 1982, Parisienne was revised to base on Chevrolet Caprice with different grille insert and taillight trim. For both Canadian and American markets, Parisienne was again available as sedan, coupe, and station wagon along with both V6 and V8 engines from the various divisions. Parisienne remained in production until 1986 with minor annual trim revisions.

Of all models based on B-platform (1977–1996), Parisienne and Bonneville (until its transfer to G-platform in 1982), were only one to have detachable rear wheel skirts. The wheel skirts were eliminated for 1982, only to return again for 1985 as to differentiate Parisienne further from Caprice. With that differentiation the Parisienne returned to using the rear quarter panels, decklid and wraparound taillamps previously used on the 1980–81 Bonneville. Wheel skirts were never fitted to the station wagon models.

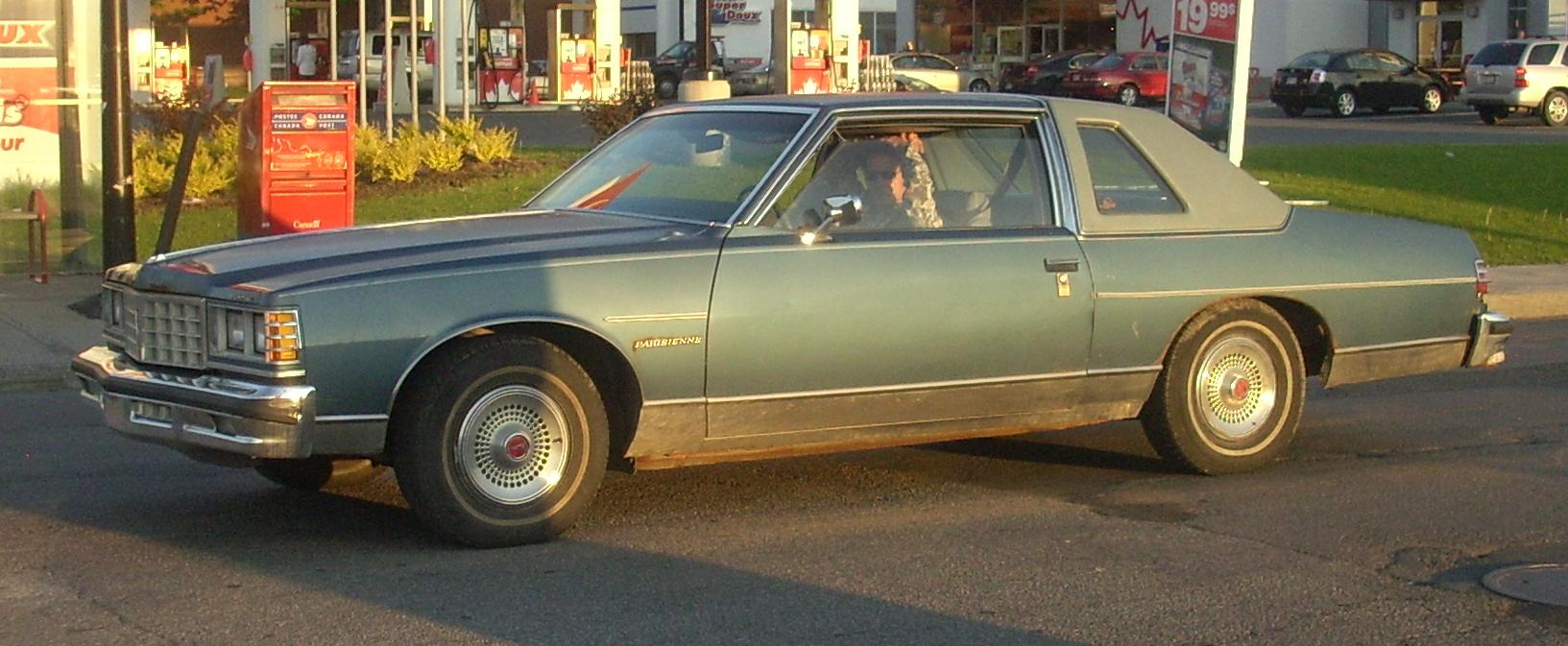
1977 Pontiac Parisienne coupe (with wheel skirts removed)

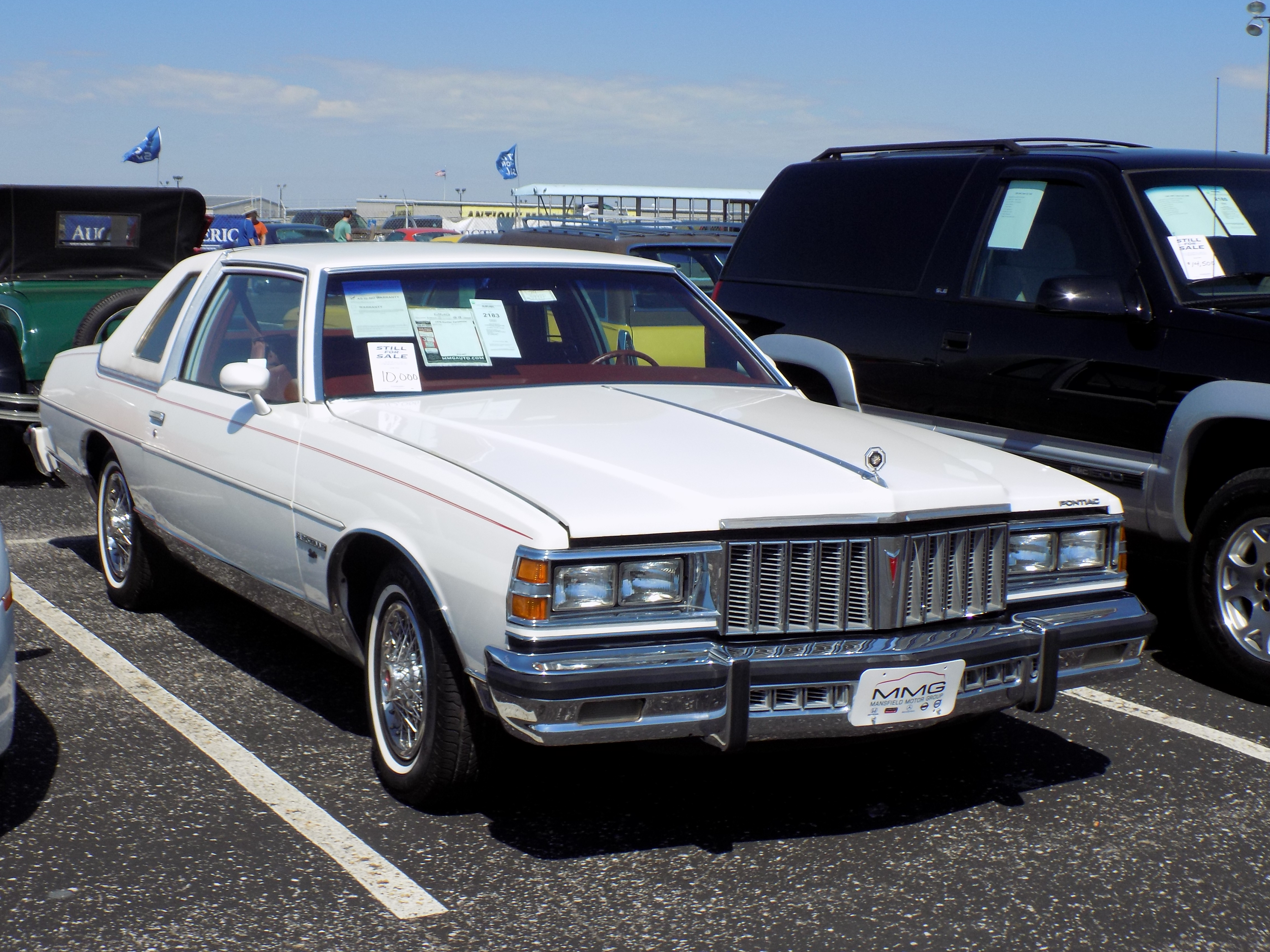
1979 Pontiac Parisienne Brougham Landau coupe

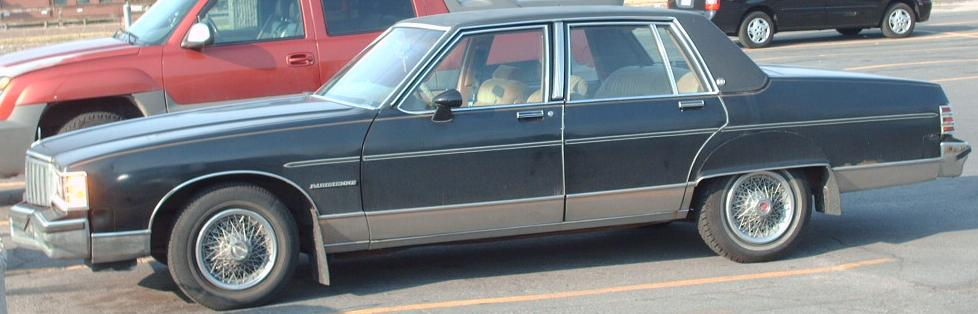
1980 Pontiac Parisienne sedan

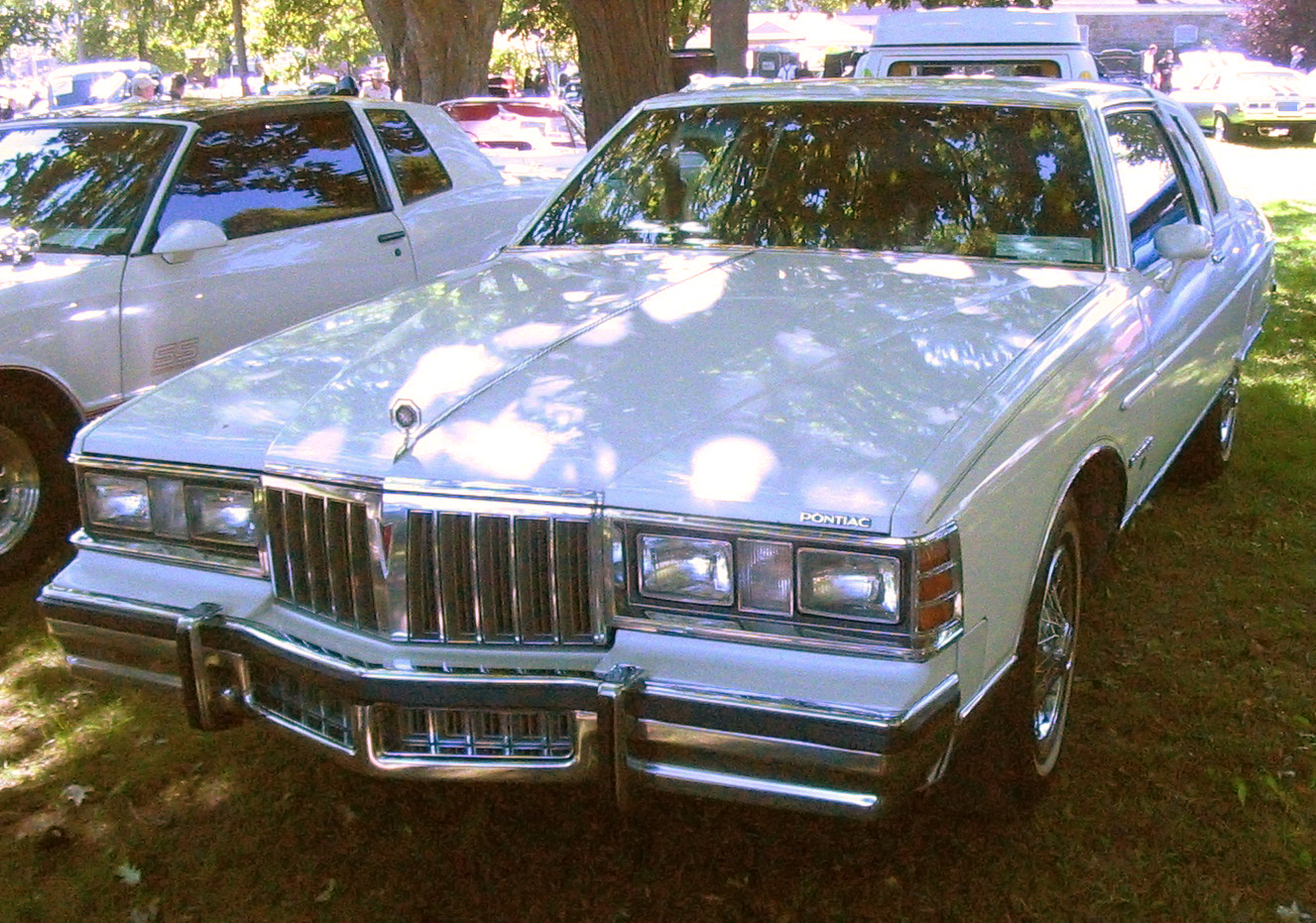
1980 Pontiac Parisienne coupe

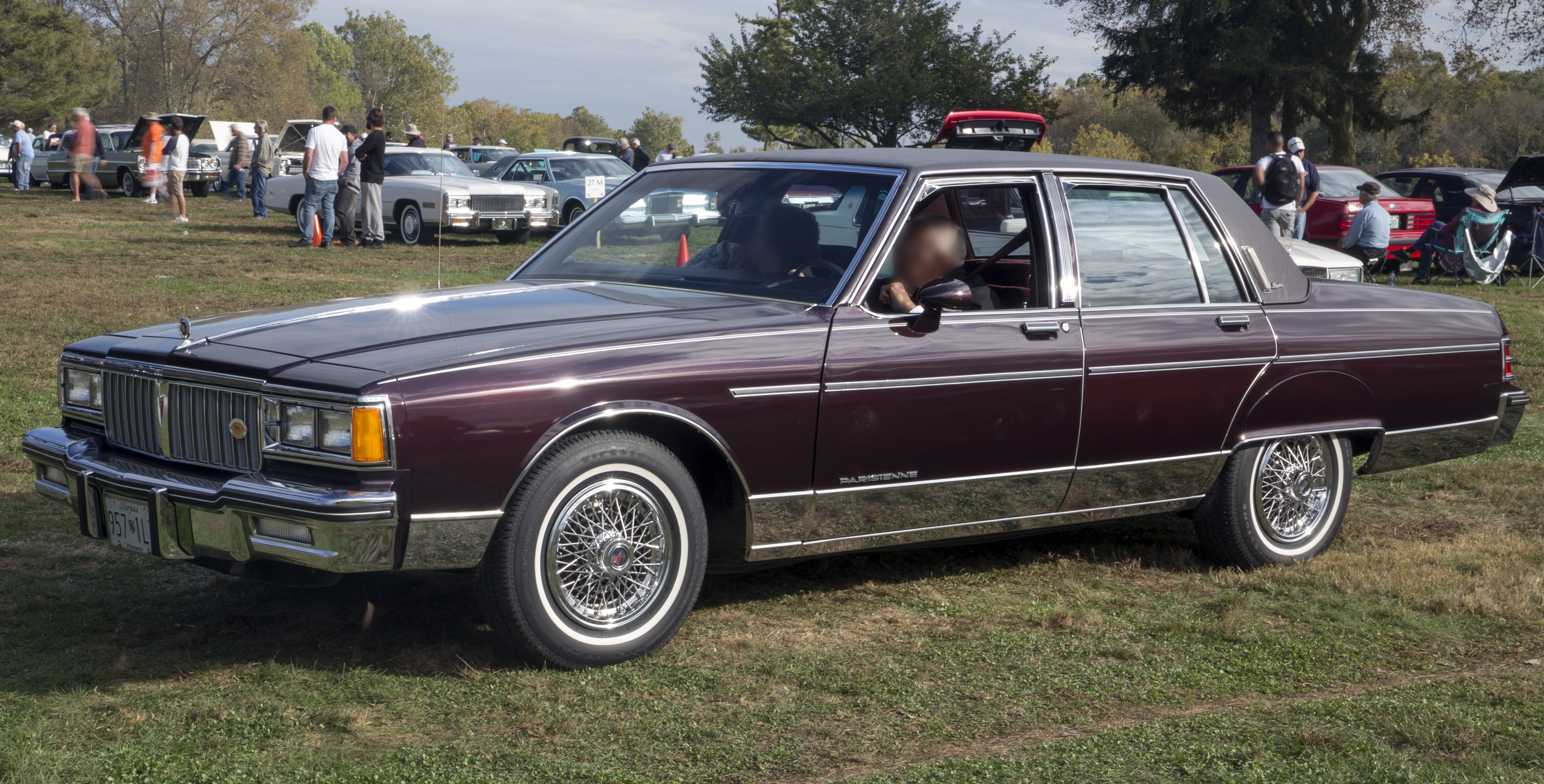
1985 Pontiac Parisienne Brougham sedan

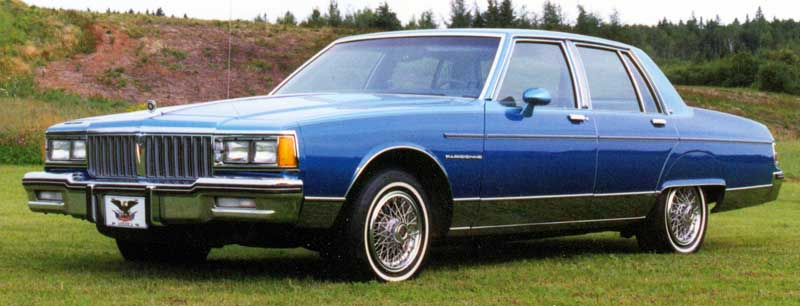
1986 Pontiac Parisienne

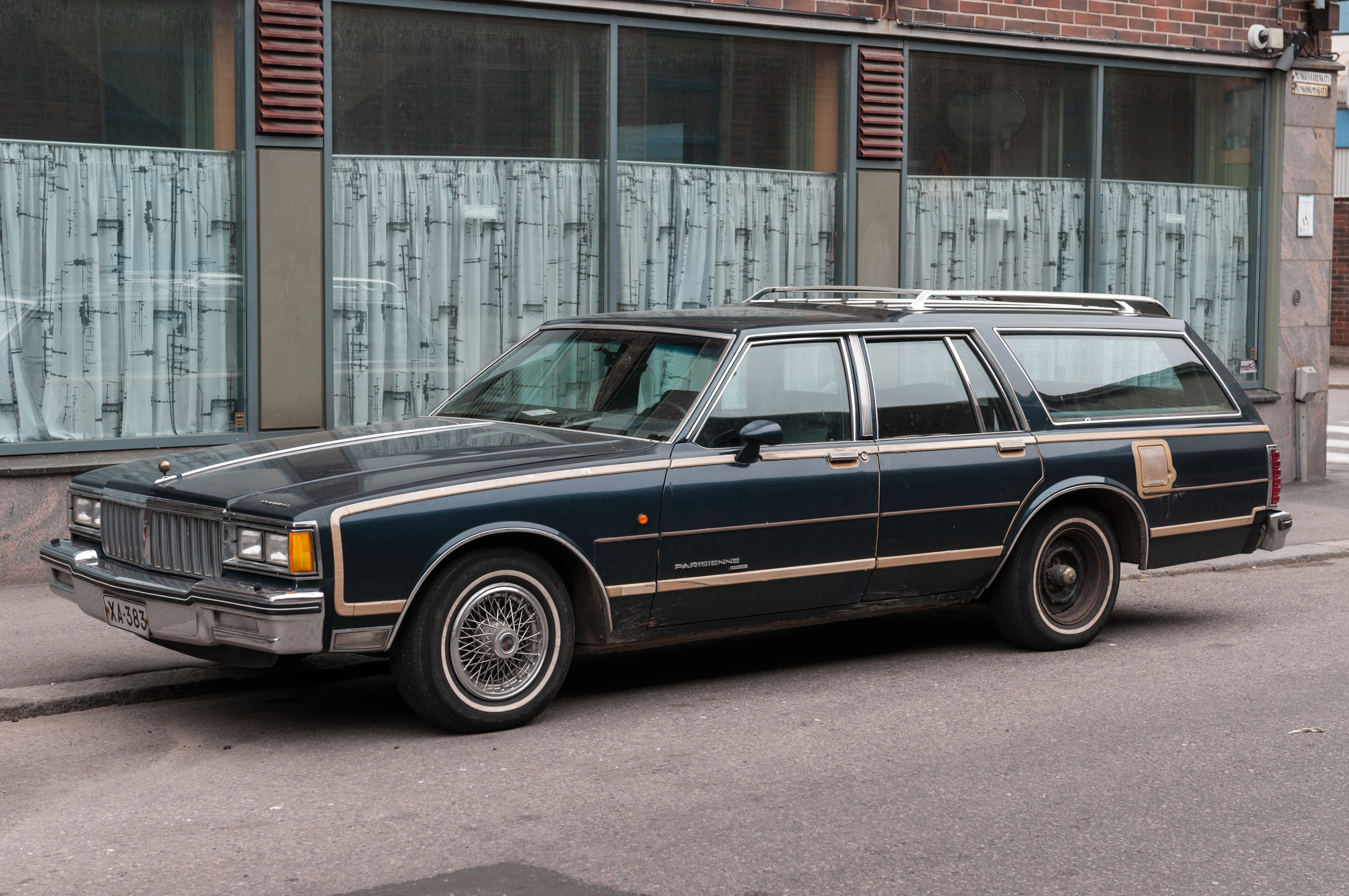
1982-1986 Pontiac Parisienne station wagon

== Exports ==
The Oshawa plant was responsible for export of Chevrolet and Pontiac vehicles to right-hand-drive (RHD) markets and Pontiac Parisiennes and Laurentians were exported in Knock-down kit form to those markets until 1968.

The '61-'64 models had the '61 Pontiac dash reversed for RHD (also shared with Chevrolets) and '65 to '68 used an adapted version of the 1965 Chevrolet Impala dash panel, again shared with Chevrolets.

Oshawa plant assembly of RHD Chevrolets and Pontiacs ceased after 1968 at the behest of General Motors in the United States.

=== Australia ===
Parisiennes and Laurentians were shipped to Australia and assembled at GM's Holden plant in Dandenong, Victoria, using some domestic parts such as seats, heaters, opposing windscreen wipers and 2 speed ventilation systems. The Laurentian was built until 1963 and the Parisienne until 1968. Australian cars were assembled from Complete Knock-down (CKD) kits (welded and painted locally.) As red rear turn signals were illegal in Australia, Australian cars had to have amber lenses drilled into the rear bumper or trunk lid (depending on the model) with the turn signals rewired to flash through them. The 1968 model was the last RHD model to be exported internationally, hence all Australian 1969 cars are 1968 models assembled for a further year.

=== New Zealand ===
Canadian Parisiennes, Laurentians, and Impalas were sent as Semi Knock-down (SKD) kit cars (completed body locally assembled to frame) to New Zealand and assembled at GM New Zealand's Petone plant until 1969. As with Australia, New Zealand 1969 models are 1968 models assembled for one more year.

=== Europe ===
Pontiac "kit cars" were also assembled by G.M. Continental, in Antwerp, Belgium

=== South Africa ===
Canadian Pontiacs were assembled by General Motors South Africa in Port Elizabeth, South Africa. The last 1968 Parisienne models were assembled in South Africa well into 1970.

=== Philippines ===
The 3rd Generation Pontiac Parisienne was also built at the Philippines by Yutivo Sons Hardware Corporation.

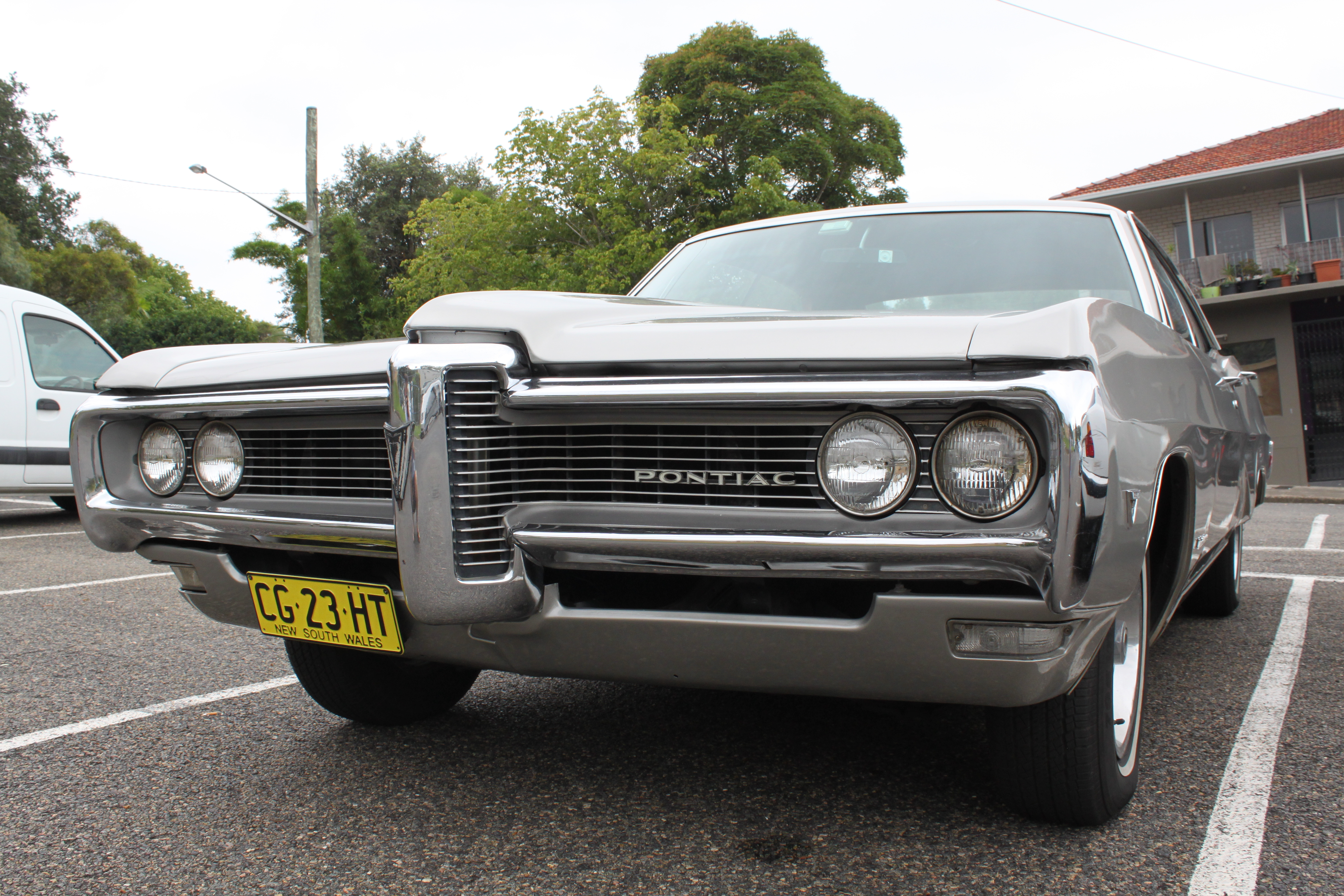
Australian assembled 1968 Pontiac Parisienne hardtop sedan, the last model of international RHD assembly

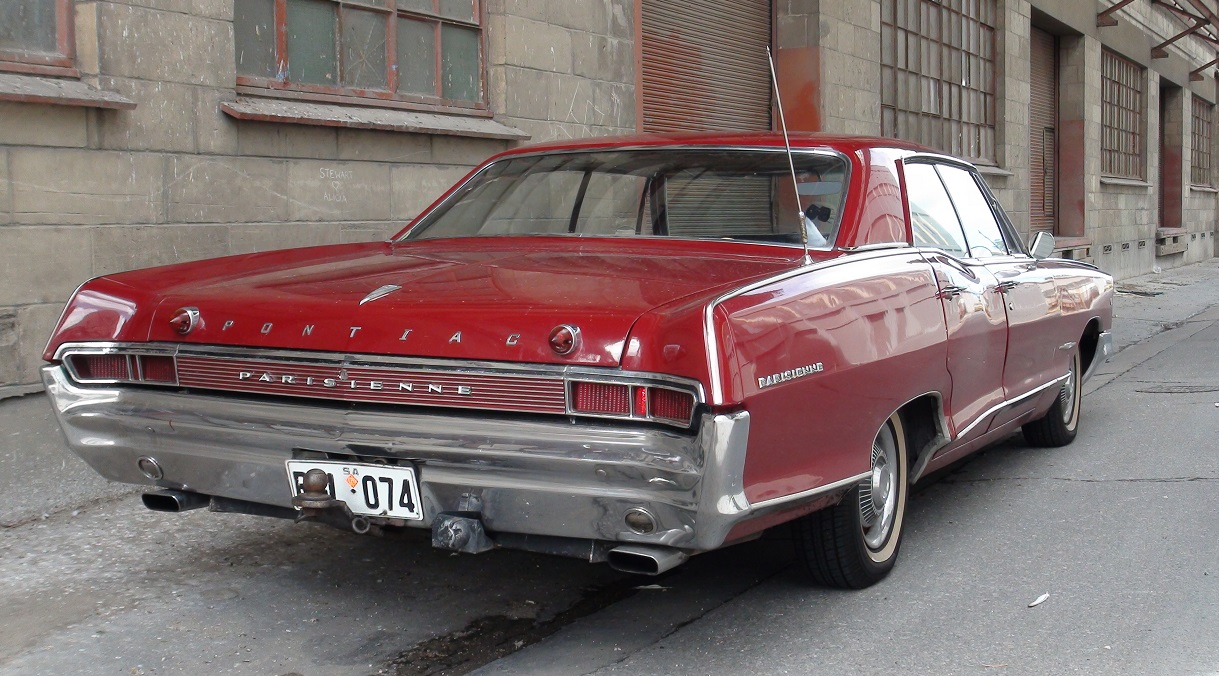
Australian assembled 1965 Pontiac Parisienne, with trunk lid mounted amber turn-signal indicators.

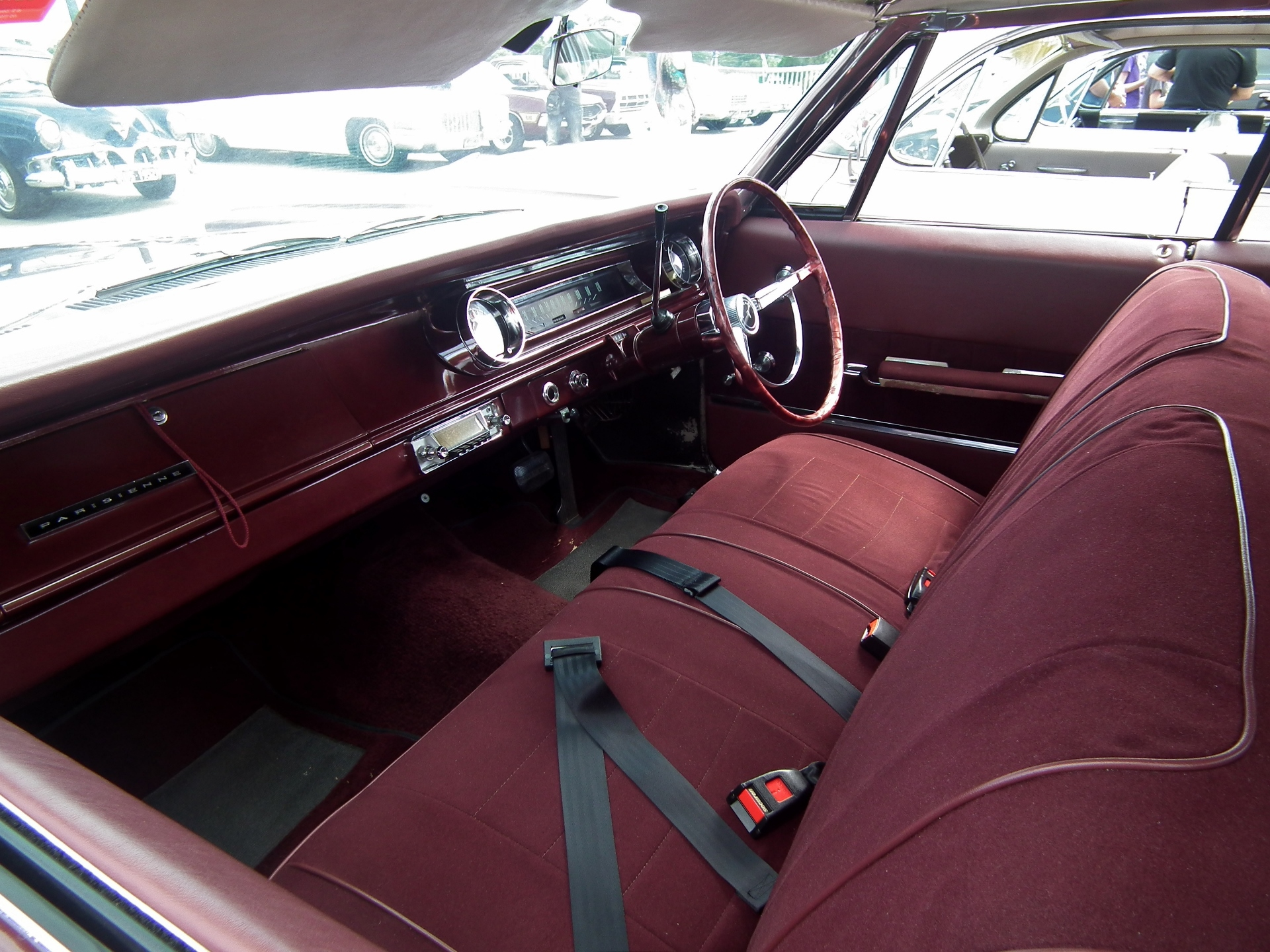
1965 RHD Pontiac Parisienne interior. The 1965 Pontiac uses a RHD version of the 1965 Chevrolet Impala dash.

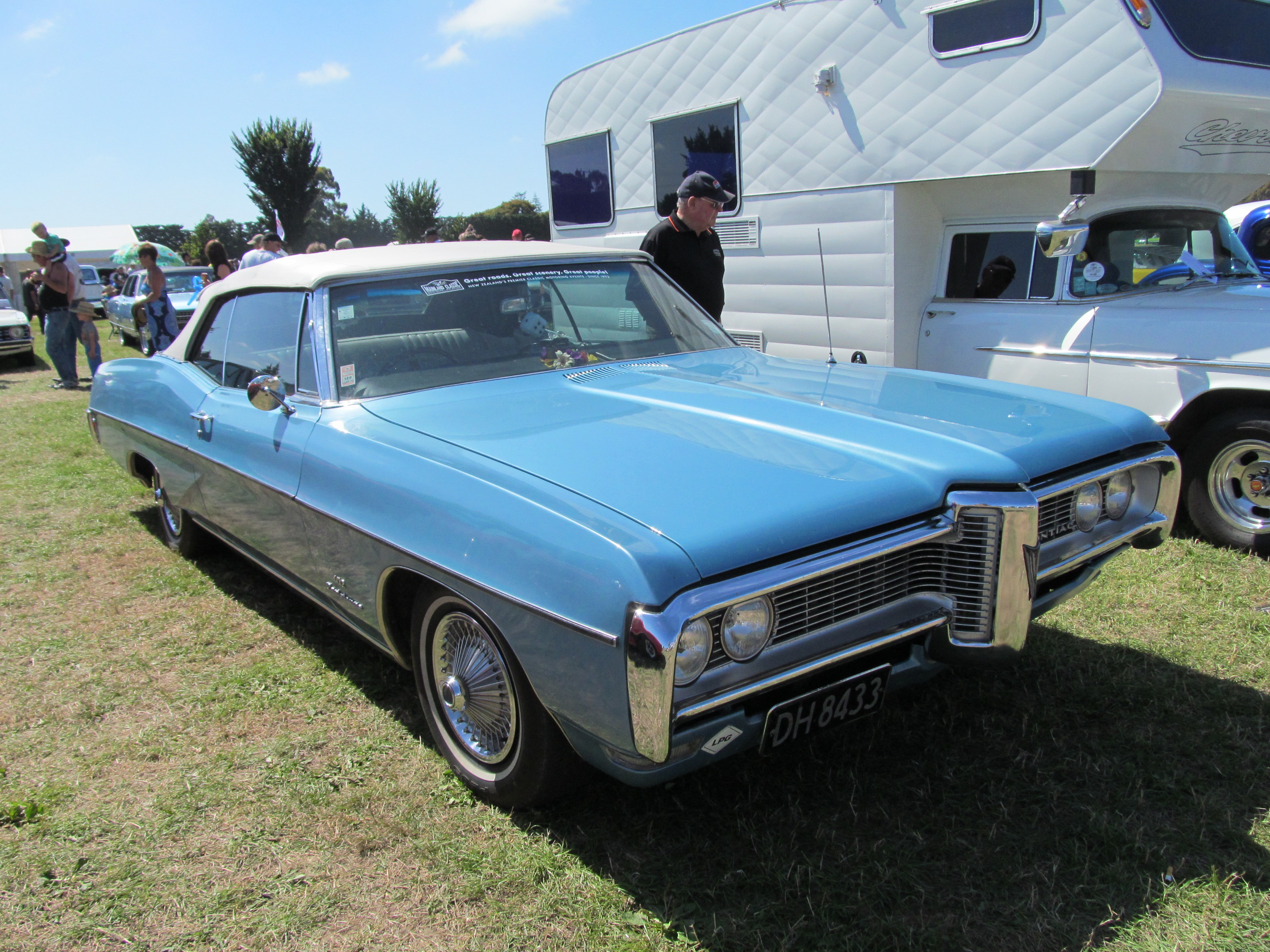
New Zealand assembled 1968 Pontiac Parisienne.

== Successor ==
The Parisienne still sold well when GM decided to drop the line after the 1986 model year with no replacement. A front wheel drive model with the Bonneville name had similar dimensions versus the 1982 mid-size model, classifying the car as a full-size by the EPA; however, the wagon model (known just as "Safari") continued until 1989.

While the Parisienne name was retired in 1986, big Pontiac fans got a completely new smaller full-sized Bonneville for 1987. This car featured front-wheel drive and a V6 as standard, in line with the contemporary Cadillac, Buick and Oldsmobile big models. Rear-wheel drive sedans returned to the Pontiac lineup with the Holden-sourced Pontiac G8 in 2008.

GM did retain the Parisienne name into the late 80's on exports to the Middle East which were re-badged Caprices.
