= Ben Keating =

American racing driver and businessman (born 1971)

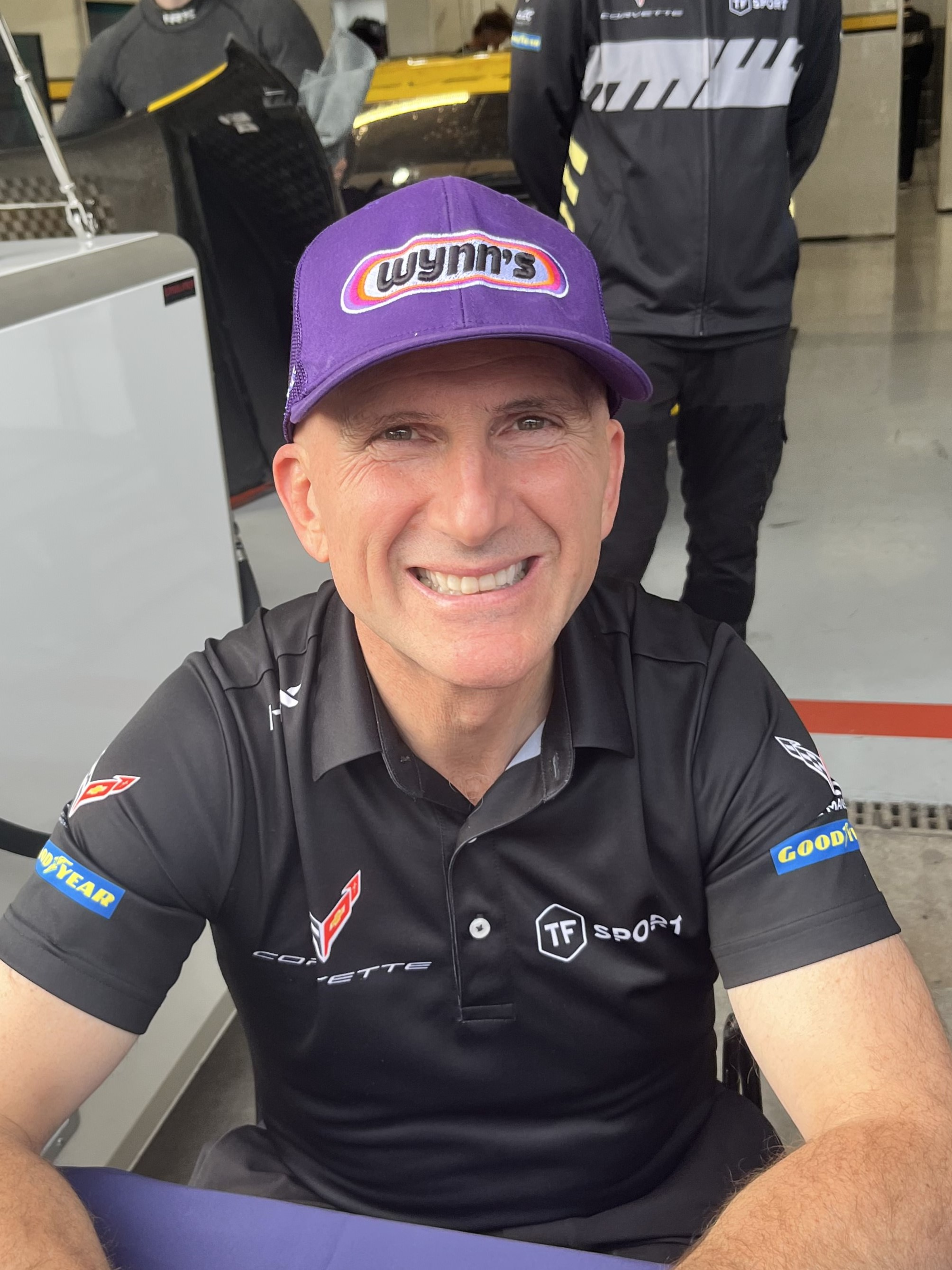
- Keating at the 2025 6 Hours of São Paulo
- Nationality: (United States) American
- Born: Benjamin Edward Keating; August 18, 1971 (age 55) Tomball, Texas, U.S.
- Education: Texas A&M University
- Employer(s): Owner, Keating Auto Group

FIA World Endurance Championship career
- Debut season: 2019–20
- Current team: TF Sport
- Categorisation: FIA Silver (until 2016); FIA Bronze (2017–)
- Car number: 33
- Former teams: Team Project 1, Corvette Racing
- Starts: 36
- Wins: 9
- Podiums: 17
- Poles: 9
- Fastest laps: 0
- Best finish: 1st in 2022 & 2023 (LMGTE Am)

IMSA SportsCar Championship career
- Debut season: 2014
- Current team: Bryan Herta Autosport with PR1/Mathiasen
- Car number: 31
- Starts: 187
- Wins: 20
- Podiums: 47
- Poles: 5
- Best finish: 1st in 2021, 2023

24 Hours of Le Mans career
- Years: 2015–2026
- Best finish: 1st (2022, 2023, 2026)
- Class wins: 3 (2022, 2023, 2026)

Previous series
- 2007–2008 2009–2010 2010–2012 2013 2014– 2019–: Viper Racing League; North American Road Racing Association; Dodge Viper Cup; American Le Mans Series; FIA World Endurance Championship; IMSA SportsCar Championship

Championship titles
- 2008 2009, 2010 2011, 2012 2021 2022, 2023: Viper Racing League; NARRA; Dodge Viper Cup; IMSA SportsCar Championship – LMP2; FIA World Endurance Championship – LMGTE Am

Awards
- 2017, 2018 2021 2022: Bob Akin Award; Jim Trueman Award; WEC Gentleman Driver of the Year

Benjamin Edward Keating (born August 18, 1971) is an American racing driver and businessman. Since his racing debut in 2007, he has competed in many endurance races worldwide, including the 24 Hours of Le Mans, 24 Hours of Daytona, 12 Hours of Sebring, as well as the IMSA SportsCar Championship and FIA World Endurance Championship. He also owns car dealerships across the state of Texas.

Keating has won his class at the 24 Hours of Le Mans three times; 2022 in LMGTE Am with TF Sport in an Aston Martin Vantage AMR, 2023 in LMGTE Am with Corvette Racing in a Chevrolet Corvette C8.R, and 2026 in LMGT3 with TF Sport in a Chevrolet Corvette Z06 GT3.R.

== Business life ==
Keating has been surrounded by the car industry his entire life. Growing up, he washed cars and parked them on the front line at the Ford dealership owned by his father, which provided Keating an inside look into the dynamics of auto dealerships. Keating eventually found himself in an internship at Service Group during his junior and senior years at Texas A&M University.

During his internship in Service Group, Keating trained staff and managers at multiple dealerships. In 1995 when he graduated from A&M with a degree in Engineering, Keating sold cars at Covert Ford in Austin, Texas. Soon after he became the Used Car Sales Manager at Tomball Ford which was owned by his father and later became a minority owner himself.

Keating purchased Port Lavaca Ford in 2002. That was followed by Port Lavaca Dodge (2002) then Port Lavaca Chevrolet (2004). As of 2024, Keating owned 30 dealerships, generating about $3 billion in annual revenue and selling over 50,000 cars annually. In 2023, the Keating Auto Group was ranked 1st as the Largest Privately Held Auto Group in Texas as well as the 9th Top Privately Held Dealership Group in the United States. Automotive News ranked the Keating Auto Group as the 15th Largest Auto Group in the Nation. In 2024, Keating was nominated for Time Magazine Dealer of the Year Award.

At each of his stores, the general manager is also a minority partner of the business.

== Racing ==
Keating began racing in 2007 after receiving a weekend track driving course as a Christmas present from his wife.

=== Viper Racing League and NARRA ===
Keating began racing in 2007 after receiving a weekend track driving course as a Christmas present from his wife. In 2007, he began racing a 2000 Dodge Viper GTS in the Viper Racing League (VRL), a league that began as track days for Viper enthusiasts. Keating received a DNF in his first race, an event at Sebring International Raceway. In 2007 Keating participated in the full VRL series and in 2008, his second full year in the league, Keating won the VRL National Championship. After the 2008 season, the VRL reorganized into the North American Road Racing Association.

In 2009, Keating participated in the NARRA US GT Championship, a 13-round series at seven venues across the Continental United States. Driving a Viper Competition Coupe, Keating claimed the national championship. He would repeat this feat in 2010.

In 2010, Keating also began racing in a new Dodge SRT-sponsored event, the 5-city, 10-race Dodge Viper Cup. Driving the specially designed Viper ACR-X, Keating finished second in the inaugural Viper Cup with race wins at Virginia International Raceway and Pocono Raceway. Keating finished the series with 501 points, 106 points behind first place. During the 2011 Viper Cup, Keating would record four race wins (New Jersey Motorsports Park, Virginia International Raceway, Texas World Speedway and Daytona). Going into the final race of the season, Keating held a 58-point advantage in the Viper Cup standings (a win being worth 60), and claimed the national championship by 20 points despite being forced into 15th place by a late-race collision. In 2012, Keating would dominate the series and repeat as national champion, recording six wins (Road Atlanta (both races), Road America (both races), Monticello Motor Club, and Watkins Glen) as well as three other top-five finishes.

=== Rolex Sports Car Series ===
Keating made his Rolex Sports Car Series debut at the Rolex 24 Hours of Daytona in 2011, racing in the Viper Exchange.com No. 66 Porsche 911 GT3 Cup. Racing for The Racer's Group (TRG), Keating and co-drivers Dominik Farnbacher, Tim George Jr. and Lucas Luhr placed 13th in their class (27th overall), completing 612 laps with a total time of 21:40:37.038.

The following year, Keating participated in a full season of the North American Endurance Championship, a subset of the Grand-AM Rolex Sports Car Series consisting of three races: the Rolex 24 Hours of Daytona, the Six Hours of The Glen, and the Brickyard Grand Prix at Indianapolis Motor Speedway. Keating drove the No. 66 Porsche in all three races. Keating pulled double-duty during the 2012 24 Hours of Daytona, also taking a shift in The Racer's Group's No. 68 Porsche GT3 Cup.

Keating would participate in the Rolex 24 Hours of Daytona again in 2013, driving the No. 66 car along with co-drivers Farnbacher, Kuno Wittmer, and Jorg Bergmeister. They would go on to place 20th in class (31st overall), completing 622 laps with a time of 23:57:15.712.

=== American Le Mans Series ===
In 2013, Keating made the jump into the American Le Mans Series, competing in the series' final season. Keating, with co-drivers Damien Faulkner and Craig Stanton in the No. 66 Porsche, would finish 5th in the GT-challenge (GTC) class in the series' opening event, the 12 Hours of Sebring. Keating would continue to race with Faulkner for most of the series. On September 21, Keating and Faulkner would score their first victory of the season at the Circuit of the Americas in Austin, Texas. In front of his friends and family from around Texas, Keating drove the first 70 minutes of the race, then handed off to Faulkner, who completed the victory with a winning margin of 12.94 seconds. Keating and Faulkner followed their first victory up with another winning effort at Virginia International Raceway. The two late-season victories would prove a boon to Keating's final position in the standings, providing him with 40 of his 84 total points and earning him an 8th-place finish in the GTC class (out of 46 drivers).

=== IMSA WeatherTech SportsCar Championship ===
==== 2014 ====
After the American Le Mans Series merged into the Rolex Sports Car Series after the 2013 season, Keating participated in the 2014 Tudor United SportsCar Championship season. Keating joined with Dutch siblings Jeroen and Sebastiaan Bleekemolen in the No. 33 Dodge Viper GT3-R for Riley Motorsports. Joined by French driver Emmanuel Collard, Keating and the Bleekemolen brothers competed in the opening event, the 24 Hours of Daytona, completing 615 laps over the day-long event, finishing 19th (40th overall). They would go on to record top-five finishes in the next two races, placing third in the Brickyard Grand Prix (Indianapolis Motor Speedway) and fourth in the Road America 500. Keating would record his second win of the season with a win at his home-state event at the Circuit of the Americas. The two wins, combined with his two top-five finishes, propelled Keating into 14th place in the final driver points standings.

==== 2015 ====
Keating started off the 2015 season pulling double-duty at the 2015 24 Hours of Daytona, taking turns in both the No. 93 and No. 33 Vipers. Keating would score his first win of the young season in the No. 93 Viper with previous Daytona co-drivers Dominik Farnbacher (2011–2013) and Kuno Wittmer (2013), along with American Al Carter. The No. 33 Viper would come in ninth in the event. Keating would drive in both cars again in the subsequent race, the 2015 12 Hours of Sebring, guiding the No. 93 car (with Carter and Belgian Marc Goossens) to a top-five finish. The No. 33 Viper (with Jeroen and Sebastiaan Bleekemolen) would again come in ninth after a radiator issue late in the race knocked the car out of the lead. Keating and Bleekemolen followed up with another strong performance and snagged their first class win of the year in the Continental Tire Road Race Showcase at Road America. As a result of their win at Road America, the No. 33 car was placed under some competitive restrictions limiting the performance of the car during the next race, the Oak Tree Grand Prix at VIR. These restrictions limited the No. 33 Viper to a seventh-place finish, preventing Keating from taking a third consecutive podium. Keating and Bleekemolen would come back strong though, and charged back into the winner's circle with a come-from-behind victory at Circuit of the Americas. Keating was hit with a penalty early, but strong driving from him and Jeroen allowed them to overcome that setback and take the victory.

==== 2016 ====
Keating followed up on 2015's winning success with his most successful IMSA WeatherTech SportsCar Championship season yet in 2016. Racing the full season with Bleekemolen for the third-straight year, Keating once again kicked off the schedule with double duty in the season-opening Rolex 24 At Daytona. He and co-drivers Jeff Mosing, Eric Foss, Gar Robinson, and Damien Faulkner put the No. 93 Viper on the GTD-class podium for the second-straight year after the 2015 Daytona victory. The No. 93 gained three positions in the race's final hour for a third-place finish. Keating and the No. 33 team in turn recovered from a Saturday night accident to finish tenth, which made ViperExchange.com the only two-car GTD team in the Rolex 24 to place both of its entries in the top-ten.

Keating scored his first win of the year in Detroit. A popular victory in the hometown of the Viper, Keating stayed in touch with the lead pack throughout his race-opening stint after qualifying sixth, racing his way into the lead as the GTD field cycled through pit stops. Bleekemolen took over and kept the No. 33 upfront to the finish.

The year's second victory followed one race after Lime Rock at Road America, where Keating and Bleekemolen co-drove to the second-year-in-a-row victory. The win moved Keating, Bleekemolen, and ViperExchange.com to third in the GTD class point standings, putting them in contention for a solid championship finish for the first time.

The No. 33 team arrived at Road Atlanta second in points for the season-ending Petit Le Mans. Again co-driving with Miller, Keating and Bleekemolen started the race from the pole and won, in what would be the final race for a Viper in IMSA GTD competition. Keating and Bleekemolen finished the season second in the team and driver GTD standings behind the No. 63 Ferrari of Scuderia Corsa.

The 2016 season also saw Keating compete in the 24 Hours of Le Mans for the second-straight year. After debuting in a GTE-Am class Viper GTS-R in 2015 with Bleekemolen and Miller, Keating switched to the LMP2 division in 2016, co-driving an open-top Nissan Oreca 03 with Bleekemolen and Marc Goossens. Despite a race-long string of issues, Keating finished Le Mans for the first time, driving the Oreca across the finish line for a 15th-place result in class.

==== 2017 ====
Keating competed in the IMSA WeatherTech SportsCar Championship in a Mercedes AMG. He partnered with the Riley Motorsports Team. The car is a naturally aspirated, 6.3-liter V8 Mercedes-AMG GT3 based on the Mercedes-AMG GT road cars. They competed in the IMSA GT Daytona (GTD) class. 2016 In December 2015, Viper Exchange announced they would again be sponsoring two Vipers in the 2016 running of the 24 Hours of Daytona. Keating would once again take shifts in both the No. 93 and No. 33 Vipers as he sought to defend his 2015 victory. Keating would be joined in the No. 33 by Dominik Farnbacher, who helped drive the No. 93 to Daytona victory in 2015, and Le Mans co-drivers Marc Miller and Jeroen Bleekemolen. Keating was joined in the No. 93 car by Trans-Am Series TA2 Champion Gar Robinson.

==== 2018 ====
Keating won his second consecutive IMSA Michelin Endurance Cup GTD title. He finished third in the GTD championship by winning a victory at Canadian Tire Motorsports Park and two third-place runs at Laguna Seca and Sebring.

==== 2019 ====
Keating won his third consecutive IMSA Michelin Endurance Cup. He finished seventh in the GTD season and had a victory at Virginia International Raceway. Also 2019, Keating became the first person to enter a Ford GT in Le Mans privately. The team placed third but was later disqualified due to a capacity issue with the car's fuel cell.

==== 2021 ====
The LMP2 was in the classic WYNN's livery. The team for LMP2 consisted of Ben Keating, Mikkel Jensen, and Scott Huffaker.

At Daytona, he started on the pole and finished in seventh. (Keating raced in two different cars for Rolex 24, LMP2, and Aston Martin) At Sebring he started second and won. After starting in the back at Watkins Glen he came back and finished second. He won The Glen 240 from pole. At Road America, he once again started on the pole, and finished third. He also won at Laguna Seca. At the Petit Le Mans, he started on the pole and crossed the finish line first. However due to post-race penalties, he finished second. Keating and his team won the IMSA Championship and the Michelin North American Endurance Cup for LMP2.

==== 2022 ====
He started 2022 with finishing third overall in the Dpi Class at the Rolex 24 at Daytona. At Sebring, he converted pole to a win with teammates Mikkel Jensen and Scott Huffaker. At Watkins Glen, he won from pole. He also won the Michelin North American Endurance Cup.

==== 2023 ====
In 2023, he started the Rolex 24 at Daytona on pole position and finished in seventh. The next race at Sebring, he once again qualified on pole position and finished in fourth. He collected podiums at Laguna Seca and Watkins Glen before winning at Road America.

=== FIA World Endurance Championship (WEC) ===
==== 2019-20 ====
Keating joined the FIA World Endurance Championship for the 2019–2020 season. He also entered several IMSA races. After speaking with many teams, he decided to join Team Project 1, having confirmed a full-season program alongside longtime partner Jeroen Bleekemolen and Felipe Fraga in the team's No. 57 Porsche 911 RSR. He had beat this team in Le Mans but was disqualified due to an issue with the car's fuel cell.

==== 2021 ====
Keating competed in the WEC in a Corvette C8.R with Corvette Racing. The Corvette ran in the GT-Am class of the WEC. It was a GTE spec car. He started the season at the Spa 6 Hour Race by qualifying on the pole and finished second. At the 24 Hours of Le Mans, he started sixth and finished second. He won at the Bahrain 6 Hour. Keating and his team finished second in the WEC Championship for GT-Am.

==== 2022 ====
Keating was honored by being selected by WEC as the Gentleman Driver of the Year. He was driving with the TF Motorsports team in an Aston Martin. He started the season at the Sebring 1000 miles where he started on pole, and finished second. He won at the 24 Hours of Le Mans with Marco Sorensen and Henrique Chaves. He also won at the 6 Hours of Fuji. Following the 8 Hours of Bahrain, he claimed the driver's championship in LMGTE Am class with Marco Sorensen and Henrique Chaves as first American to win a class title since the resurrection of WEC in 2012.

==== 2023 ====
Keating, Nicky Catsburg, and Nico Varrone raced C8R for Corvette Racing. He collected wins at Sebring 1000 miles, 6 Hours of Portimão, and the 24 Hours of Le Mans. Following the 6 Hours of Monza he clinched the 2023 World Championship.

==== Additional races ====
In addition to his races in 2021, Keating participated in a Viper Days Reunion event at Road America during the August 26- 29th weekend and planned to race in the Intercontinental GT 8 Hour race at Indy in mid-October. Keating's team looks to repeat their win last year at the Indy 8hr in the Pro-Am class.

==== 24 Hours of Le Mans ====
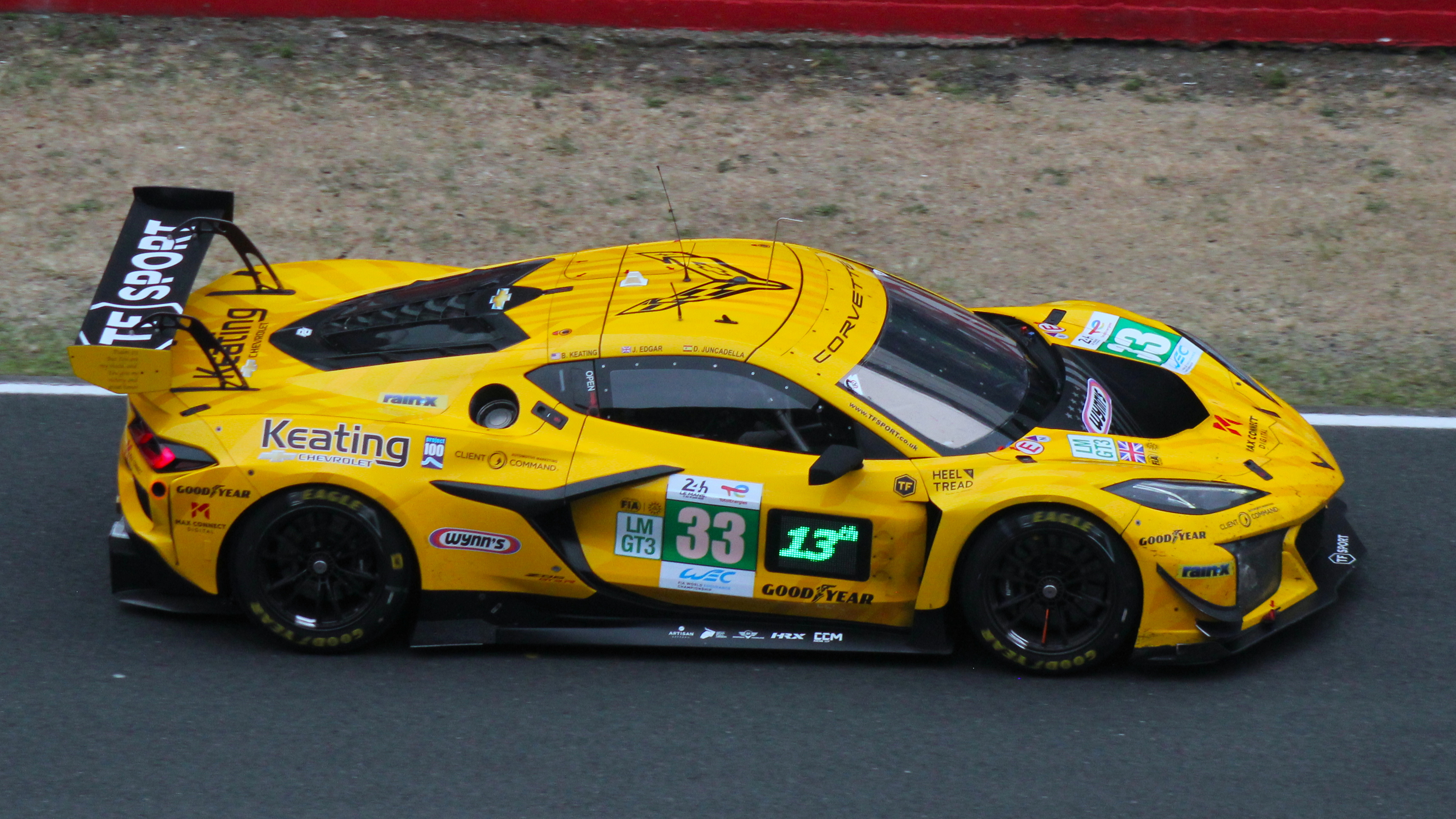
Keating's No. 33 car at the 2025 24 Hours of Le Mans

On April 16, 2015, the Automobile Club de l'Ouest announced that the Viper Exchange.com/Riley Motorsports entry into the 2015 24 Hours of Le Mans had been approved, with American Marc Miller joining Keating and Jeroen Bleekemolen as co-driver. The team will drive the No. 53 Dodge Viper GTS-R in the GTE Am class. The team was first among the reserves for the event, and the entry gives Keating the opportunity to accomplish the feat of winning both the 24 Hours of Daytona and the 24 Hours of Le Mans events in the same year. This would be the first 24 Hours of Le Mans for both Keating and Miller, while Bleekemolen earned his tenth consecutive start in the event. Jeroen finished fourth in class in qualifying, and so the team had good position for the start of the race. Bleekemolen continued the strong start with his opening shift in the car, leading for most of the third hour, and Keating continued to maintain a top-four position during the second shift. Miller took the third shift through much of the night, and the team entered the final shift, again driven by Bleekemolen, in fifth place. However, Bleekemolen began to notice issues with the gearbox. After replacing the gearbox failed to resolve the problems, the No. 53 car was forced to retire from the race at 13:45, having completed 304 laps. Keating continued to race at Le Mans from 2016–2017, 2019–2026.

== Partnership with VLF Automotive ==
=== Origins ===
VLF Automotive is a joint venture between designer Henrik Fisker, former GM Vice Chair Bob Lutz and manufacturer Gilbert Villarreal. Lutz and Villarreal began VL automotive in 2012, and in 2013 unveiled the VL Destino, a luxury automobile based on Fisker's Karma electric car. However, VL did away with the Karma's fully electric powertrain and replaced it with the 6.2L V8 GM engine used in the Chevrolet Corvette ZR1. Eventually Fisker joined the team, which then became VLF automotive. VLF then began work on a new automobile built around the 8.4L V10 of the Dodge Viper, which would become the Force 1 V10.

=== Keating and the Force 1 ===
Fisker and Keating met in 2015 and quickly developed a partnership, combining Fisker's legendary designs with Keating's extensive expertise with performance vehicles, particularly his intimate knowledge of the Dodge Viper. In particular, Keating helped design the active suspension used in the Force 1 V10 using his decade of experience racing Vipers to tune the suspension for both on-the-road and on-the-track needs. As part of the partnership, the first run of the Force 1 V10, totaling 50 cars, were sold entirely through Keating's Viper Exchange dealership.

== Racing record ==
=== Racing career summary ===
Season	Series	Team	Races	Wins	Poles	F/Laps	Podiums	Points	Position
2010	Dodge Viper Cup	N/A	10	2	?	?	4	501	**2nd**
2011	Dodge Viper Cup	N/A	5	?	?	?	?	538	**1st**
2011	American Le Mans Series - GTC	TRG	1	0	0	0	0	20	21st
2011	Grand-Am Rolex Series - GT	TRG	1	0	0	0	0	18	55th
2012	Grand-Am Rolex Series - GT	TRG	3	0	0	0	0	56	36th
2013	American Le Mans Series - GTC	TRG	10	2	0	0	3	84	8th
2013	Grand-Am Rolex Series - GT	TRG	1	0	0	0	0	16	62nd
2013	Pirelli World Challenge - GTS	TRG-AMR	2	0	0	0	0	132	37th
2013	IMSA GT3 Challenge by Yokohama - Platinum Cup	TPC Racing	4	0	0	0	0	21	21st
2014	United SportsCar Championship - GTD	Riley Motorsports	11	2	0	0	3	235	14th
2015	United SportsCar Championship - GTD	Riley Motorsports	10	3	0	0	4	265	6th
2015	24 Hours of Le Mans - LMGTE Am	Riley Motorsports–TI Auto	1	0	0	0	0	N/A	DNF
2015	US GT Championship Series - GTU	N/A	2	0	1	1	0	18	9th
2015	Aston Martin Le Mans Festival - GT4	TRG-AMR	1	0	0	0	0	N/A	7th
2016	IMSA SportsCar Championship - GTD	Riley Motorsports	11	3	0	0	5	303	**2nd**
2016	24 Hours of Le Mans - LMP2	Murphy Prototypes	1	0	0	0	0	N/A	15th
2017	IMSA Sportscar Championship - GTD	Riley Motorsports - Team AMG	10	2	0	0	4	290	5th
2017	IMSA Sportscar Championship - Prototype Challenge	Starworks Motorsport	1	0	0	0	0	26	23rd
2017	24 Hours of Le Mans - LMP2	Keating Motorsport	1	0	0	0	0	N/A	20th
2017	24H Series - A6	Black Falcon	1	0	0	0	1	0	NC†
2018	IMSA SportsCar Championship - GTD	Mercedes-AMG Team Riley Motorsports	11	1	0	0	3	299	**3rd**
2018	24H GT Series - Continents' - A6	Black Falcon	1	0	0	0	0	0	NC†
2018	24 Hours of Le Mans - LMGTE Am	Keating Motorsport	1	0	0	0	1	N/A	**3rd**
2019	IMSA SportsCar Championship - GTD	Mercedes-AMG Team Riley Motorsports	10	1	1	0	1	236	7th
2019	24H GT Series - Continents' - A6	Abu Dhabi Racing Black Falcon	3	2	0	0	2	0	NC†
2019	24 Hours of Le Mans - LMGTE Am	Keating Motorsport	1	0	0	0	0	N/A	DSQ
2019–20	FIA World Endurance Championship - LMGTE Am	Team Project 1	8	1	1	0	3	101.5	6th
2020	24 Hours of Le Mans - LMGTE Am	Team Project 1	1	0	0	0	0	N/A	14th
2020	IMSA SportsCar Championship - LMP2	PR1/Mathiasen Motorsports	1	0	1	0	1	0	NC†
2020	IMSA SportsCar Championship - GTD	Riley Motorsports	3	0	0	0	0	67	32nd
2020	Intercontinental GT Challenge	DXDT Racing	1	0	0	0	0	0	NC
2021	FIA World Endurance Championship - LMGTE Am	TF Sport	6	1	2	0	3	90.5	**2nd**
2021	24 Hours of Le Mans - LMGTE Am	TF Sport	1	0	0	0	1	N/A	**2nd**
2021	Le Mans Cup - GT3	TF Sport	1	0	0	0	0	0	NC†
2021	IMSA SportsCar Championship - GTD	TF Sport	1	0	0	0	0	259	52nd
2021	IMSA SportsCar Championship - LMP2	PR1/Mathiasen Motorsports	8	4	5	0	7	2162	**1st**
2021	Intercontinental GT Challenge	DXDT Racing	1	0	0	0	0	0	NC
2022	FIA World Endurance Championship - LMGTE Am	TF Sport	6	2	3	0	4	141	**1st**
2022	24 Hours of Le Mans - LMGTE Am	TF Sport	1	1	0	0	1	N/A	**1st**
2022	IMSA SportsCar Championship - DPi	JDC-Miller MotorSports	1	0	0	0	1	332	21st
2022	IMSA SportsCar Championship - LMP2	PR1/Mathiasen Motorsports	5	3	3	0	3	1050	11th
2022	GT World Challenge America - Pro/Am	CrowdStrike Racing by Riley Motorsports	1	0	0	0	0	0	NC
2022	Intercontinental GT Challenge	CrowdStrike with Riley Motorsports	1	0	0	0	0	0	NC
2023	FIA World Endurance Championship - LMGTE Am	Corvette Racing	7	3	3	0	5	173	**1st**
2023	24 Hours of Le Mans - LMGTE Am	Corvette Racing	1	1	1	0	1	N/A	**1st**
2023	IMSA SportsCar Championship - LMP2	PR1/Mathiasen Motorsports	7	1	4	0	4	1995	**1st**
2024	IMSA SportsCar Championship - GTP	JDC-Miller MotorSports	1	0	0	0	0	272	28th
2024	IMSA SportsCar Championship - LMP2	United Autosports USA	7	1	2	0	1	1962	5th
2024	FIA World Endurance Championship - LMGT3	Proton Competition							
2025	FIA World Endurance Championship - LMGT3	TF Sport							
2025	IMSA SportsCar Championship - LMP2	PR1/Mathiasen Motorsports							
2025	IMSA SportsCar Championship - GTD Pro	Trackhouse by TF Sport							
2026	IMSA SportsCar Championship - LMP2	Bryan Herta Autosport with PR1/Mathiasen	1	0	0	0	0	278	36th
2026	FIA World Endurance Championship - LMGT3	TF Sport	1	1	0	0	1	50*	**3rd**
2026	GT World Challenge America - Am	Lone Star Racing	1	1	1	0	1	0	NC†

^{†} As Keating was a guest driver, he was ineligible to score points.
^{*} Season still in progress.

==== Complete Rolex Sports Car Series results ====
Year	Event	Class	No	Team	Car	Co-drivers	Laps	Total Time	Position	Class Pos.
2011	24 Hours of Daytona	GT	66	(United States) The Racer's Group (TRG)	Porsche 997 GT3 Cup	(Germany) Dominik Farnbacher (United States) Tim George Jr. (Germany) Lucas Luhr	612	21:40:37.038	27th	13th
2012	24 Hours of Daytona	GT	66	(United States) TRG	Porsche 997 GT3 Cup	(Germany) Dominik Farnbacher (France) Patrick Pilet (Denmark) Allan Simonsen	721	24:01:42.169	17th	7th
2012	24 Hours of Daytona	GT	68	(United States) TRG	Porsche 997 GT3 Cup	(United States) Carlos Gómez (Canada) Chris Cumming (Republic of Ireland) Damien Faulkner (France) Kévin Estre	640	24:01:45.739	37th	24th
2012	Six Hours of The Glen	GT	66	(United States) TRG	Porsche 997 GT3 Cup	(Republic of Ireland) Damien Faulkner	137	4:37:25.155	29th	19th
2012	Brickyard Grand Prix	GT	66	(United States) TRG	Porsche 997 GT3 Cup	(Germany) Jorg Bergmeister	90	3:01:18.879	18th	11th
2013	24 Hours of Daytona	GT	66	(United States) TRG	Porsche 997 GT3 Cup	(Germany) Dominik Farnbacher (Germany) Jorg Bergmeister (Canada) Kuno Wittmer	622	23:57:15.712	31th	20th

==== Complete American Le Mans Series results ====
(key) (Races in bold indicate pole position; races in italics indicate fastest lap)

Year	Team	Class	Make	Engine	1	2	3	4	5	6	7	8	9	10	Pos.	Points	Ref
2011	TRG	GTC	Porsche 911 GT3 Cup	Porsche 3.8 L Flat-6	SEB	LBH	LRP	MOS	MDO	ELK	BAL	LAG	PET; 4		21st	20	
2013	TRG	GTC	Porsche 911 GT3 Cup	Porsche 4.0 L Flat-6	SEB; 5	LBH; 7	LAG; 4	LRP; 3	MOS; 8	ELK; Ret	BAL; Ret	COA; 1	VIR; 1	PET; 6	8th	94	

==== Complete IMSA SportsCar Championship results ====
(key) (Races in bold indicate pole position; races in italics indicate fastest lap)

Year	Entrant	No.	Class	Make	Engine	1	2	3	4	5	6	7	8	9	10	11	12	Rank	Points	Ref
2014	Riley Motorsports	33	GTD	SRT Viper GT3-R	SRT 8.0 V10	DAY; 19	SEB; 24	LGA; 16	DET; 11	WGL; 17	**MOS**; 1	IMS; 3	ELK; 4	VIR; 13	COA; 1	PET; 17		14th	235	
2015	Riley Motorsports	33	GTD	Dodge Viper GT3-R	Dodge 8.3 L V10	DAY; 1	**SEB**; 9	LGA; 11	DET; 10	WGL; 6	LIM; 2	ELK; 1	VIR; 7	COA; 1	PET; 12			6th	265	
2016	Riley Motorsports	33	GTD	Dodge Viper GT3-R	Dodge 8.3 L V10	DAY; 9	SEB; 12	LGA; 6	DET; 1	WGL; 4	MOS; 11	LIM; 3	ELK; 1	VIR; 6	COA; 13	**PET**; **1**		2nd	303	
2017	Riley Motorsports - Team AMG	33	GTD	Mercedes-AMG GT3	Mercedes-AMG M159 6.2 L V8	DAY; 3	SEB; 1	LBH; 2	COA; 1	DET; 14	WGL; 10	MOS; 7	LIM; 15	ELK; 4	VIR	LGA; 8	PET; 4	5th	290	
2018	Mercedes-AMG Team Riley Motorsports	33	GTD	Mercedes-AMG GT3	Mercedes-AMG M159 6.2 L V8	DAY; 4	SEB; 3	MDO; 9	DET; 4	WGL; 5	MOS; 1	LIM; 6	ELK; 5	VIR; 5	LGA; 3	PET; 8		3rd	299	
2019	Mercedes-AMG Team Riley Motorsports	33	GTD	Mercedes-AMG GT3	Mercedes-AMG M159 6.2 L V8	DAY; 6	SEB; 5	MDO; 14	DET	WGL; 15	MOS; 7	LIM; 9	**ELK**; **14**	VIR; 1	LGA; 5	PET; 4		7th	236	
2020	PR1/Mathiasen Motorsports	52	LMP2	Oreca 07	Gibson GK428 4.2 L V8	**DAY**; 2†	SEB	ELK	ATL	PET	LGA	SEB						0	NC	
2020	Riley Motorsports	74	GTD	Mercedes-AMG GT3 Evo	Mercedes-AMG M159 6.2 L V8	DAY; 11	DAY	SEB	ELK	VIR	ATL; 4	MDO	CLT	PET; 12	LGA	SEB		32nd	67	
2021	PR1/Mathiasen Motorsports	52	LMP2	Oreca 07	Gibson GK428 4.2 L V8	**DAY**; **7†**	SEB; 1	WGL; 2	**WGL**; **1**	**ELK**; **3**	**LGA**; **1**	**PET**; **2**						1st	2162	
2021	TF Sport	97	GTD	Aston Martin Vantage AMR GT3	Aston Martin 4.0 L Turbo V8	DAY; 7	SEB	MDO	DET	WGL	WGL	LIM	ELK	LGA	LBH	VIR	PET	52nd	259	
2022	JDC-Miller MotorSports	5	DPi	Cadillac DPi-V.R	Cadillac 5.5 L V8	DAY; 3	SEB	LBH	LGA	MDO	DET	WGL	CTM	ELK	PET			20th	332	
2022	PR1/Mathiasen Motorsports	52	LMP2	Oreca 07	Gibson GK428 4.2 L V8	**DAY**; **4†**	**SEB**; 1	LGA	MDO	**WGL**; 1	ELK	PET; 6						11th	1050	
2023	PR1/Mathiasen Motorsports	52	LMP2	Oreca 07	Gibson GK428 4.2 L V8	**DAY**; 7†	SEB; 4	LGA; 2	WGL; 3	ELK; 1	**IMS**; 4	**PET**; 2						1st	1995	
2024	JDC-Miller MotorSports	85	GTP	Porsche 963	Porsche 9RD 4.6 L Turbo V8	DAY; 6	SEB	LBH	LGA	DET	WGL	ELK	IMS	PET				28th	272	
2024	United Autosports USA	2	LMP2	Oreca 07	Gibson GK428 4.2 L V8	**DAY**; 6	SEB; 10	WGL; 8	MOS; 4	ELK; 1	IMS; 9	**PET**; 10						5th	1962	
2025	Trackhouse by TF Sport	91	GTD Pro	Chevrolet Corvette Z06 GT3.R	Chevrolet LT6 5.5 L V8	DAY; 9	SEB	LGA	DET	WGL	MOS	ELK	VIR	IMS	PET			35th	243	
2025	PR1/Mathiasen Motorsports	52	LMP2	Oreca 07	Gibson GK428 4.2 L V8	DAY; 3	SEB	WGL	MOS	ELK	IMS	PET						45th	332	
2026	Bryan Herta Autosport with PR1/Mathiasen	52	LMP2	Oreca 07	Gibson GK428 4.2 L V8	DAY; 6	SEB	WGL	MOS	ELK	IMS	PET						36th	278	

^{†} Points only counted towards the Michelin Endurance Cup, and not the overall LMP2 Championship

=== Complete FIA World Endurance Championship results ===
(key) (Races in bold indicate pole position; races in italics indicate fastest lap)

Year	Entrant	Class	Chassis	Engine	1	2	3	4	5	6	7	8	Rank	Pts
2019–20	Team Project 1	LMGTE Am	Porsche 911 RSR	Porsche 4.0 L Flat-6	SIL; 10	FUJ; 3	SHA; 2	**BHR**; 1	COA; 11	SPA; 6	LMS; 8	BHR; 6	6th	101.5
2021	TF Sport	LMGTE Am	Aston Martin Vantage AMR	Aston Martin 4.0 L Turbo V8	**SPA**; 2	ALG; 7	**MNZ**; 12	LMS; 2	BHR; 1	BHR; Ret			2nd	90.5
2022	TF Sport	LMGTE Am	Aston Martin Vantage AMR	Aston Martin 4.0 L Turbo V8	**SEB**; 2	**SPA**; 2	LMS; 1	MNZ; Ret	**FUJ**; 1	BHR; 4			1st	141
2023	Corvette Racing	LMGTE Am	Chevrolet Corvette C8.R	Chevrolet 5.5 L V8	SEB; 1	**PRT**; 1	SPA; 2	**LMS**; 1	MNZ; 4	**FUJ**; 2	BHR; 7		1st	173
2024	Proton Competition	LMGT3	Ford Mustang GT3	Ford Coyote 5.4 L V8	QAT	IMO	SPA	LMS	SÃO	COA; NC	FUJ	BHR	35th	0
2025	TF Sport	LMGT3	Chevrolet Corvette Z06 GT3.R	Chevrolet LT6.R 5.5 L V8	QAT; 1	IMO; 7	SPA; 13	LMS; 6	SÃO; 7	COA; Ret	FUJ; 11	BHR; 6	6th	78
2026	TF Sport	LMGT3	Chevrolet Corvette Z06 GT3.R	Chevrolet LT6.R 5.5 L V8	IMO	SPA	LMS; 1	SÃO; 8	COA	FUJ	CAT	MNZ	3rd*	54*

=== 24 Hours of Le Mans results ===
Year	Team	Co-Drivers	Car	Class	Laps	Pos.	Class Pos.
2015	(United States) Riley Motorsports–TI Auto	(Netherlands) Jeroen Bleekemolen (United States) Marc Miller	SRT Viper GTS-R	GTE; Am	304	DNF	DNF
2016	(Republic of Ireland) Murphy Prototypes	(Netherlands) Jeroen Bleekemolen (Belgium) Marc Goossens	Oreca 03R-Nissan	LMP2	323	34th	15th
2017	(United States) Keating Motorsports	(United States) Ricky Taylor (Netherlands) Jeroen Bleekemolen	Riley Mk. 30-Gibson	LMP2	312	47th	20th
2018	(United States) Keating Motorsports	(Netherlands) Jeroen Bleekemolen (Germany) Luca Stolz	Ferrari 488 GTE	GTE; Am	334	28th	**3rd**
2019	(United States) Keating Motorsports	(Netherlands) Jeroen Bleekemolen (Brazil) Felipe Fraga	Ford GT	GTE; Am	334	DSQ	DSQ
2020	(Germany) Team Project 1	(Netherlands) Jeroen Bleekemolen (Brazil) Felipe Fraga	Porsche 911 RSR	GTE; Am	326	40th	14th
2021	(United Kingdom) TF Sport	(Luxembourg) Dylan Pereira (Brazil) Felipe Fraga	Aston Martin Vantage AMR	GTE; Am	339	26th	**2nd**
2022	(United Kingdom) TF Sport	(Portugal) Henrique Chaves (Denmark) Marco Sørensen	Aston Martin Vantage AMR	GTE; Am	343	34th	**1st**
2023	(United States) Corvette Racing	(Netherlands) Nicky Catsburg (Argentina) Nicolás Varrone	Chevrolet Corvette C8.R	GTE; Am	313	26th	**1st**
2024	(United States) United Autosports USA	(Portugal) Filipe Albuquerque (United Kingdom) Ben Hanley	Oreca 07-Gibson	LMP2	272	42nd	13th
2024	(United States) United Autosports USA	(Portugal) Filipe Albuquerque (United Kingdom) Ben Hanley	Oreca 07-Gibson	LMP2 Pro-Am	272	42nd	6th
2025	(United Kingdom) TF Sport	(United Kingdom) Jonny Edgar (Spain) Daniel Juncadella	Chevrolet Corvette Z06 GT3.R	LMGT3	339	39th	7th
2026	(United Kingdom) TF Sport	(United Kingdom) Jonny Edgar (Netherlands) Nicky Catsburg	Chevrolet Corvette Z06 GT3.R	LMGT3	336	33rd	**1st**
