= VLF Force 1 =

Sports car

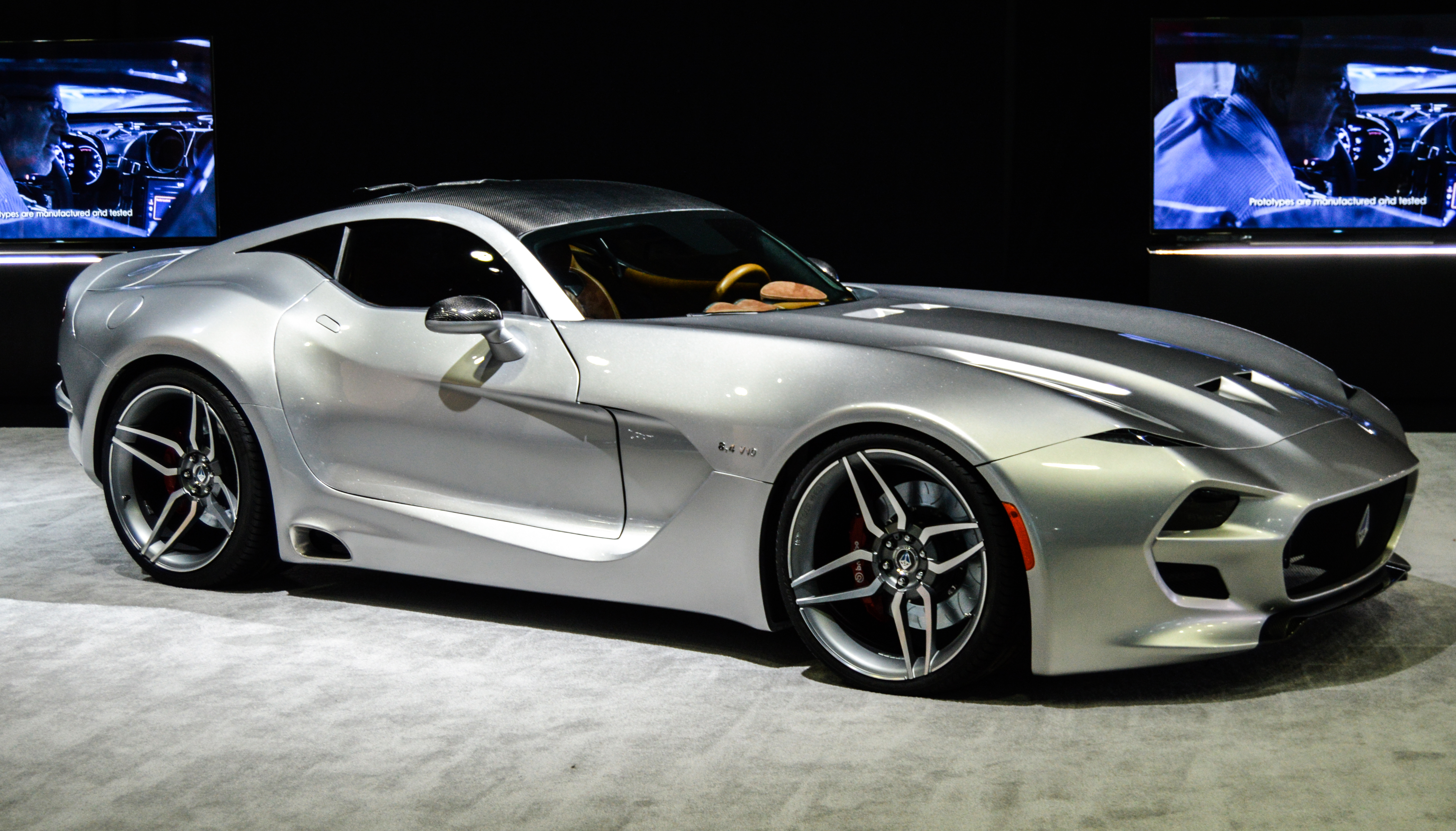

Overview
- Manufacturer: VLF Automotive
- Production: April 2016 (50 Units)
- Assembly: United States: Auburn Hills, Michigan
- Designer: Henrik Fisker

Body and chassis
- Class: Sports car (S)
- Body style: 2-door coupé
- Layout: Front mid-engine, rear-wheel drive
- Related: VLF Destino; Dodge Viper (VX I)

Powertrain
- Engine: 8.4 L Viper V10
- Power output: 745 hp (556 kW); 638 lb⋅ft (865 N⋅m)
- Transmission: 6-speed Tremec TR-6060 manual; 6-speed Ford 6R80 automatic

Dimensions
- Wheelbase: 98.9 in (2,510 mm)
- Length: 4,545 mm (179 in)
- Width: 2,018 mm (79 in)
- Height: 1,243 mm (49 in)
- Curb weight: 1,540 kg (3,395 lb)

The VLF Force 1 is an American sports car produced by VLF Automotive. Based on the Dodge Viper (VX I), the Force 1 was designed by automobile designer Henrik Fisker. VLF Automotive also partnered with American racing driver and Viper enthusiast Ben Keating during the development of the Force 1, leveraging his experience with the engine. The Force 1 V10 was first unveiled at the 2016 Detroit Auto Show, with the production of the first run of 50 vehicles planned to begin in April 2016.

== History ==
VLF Automotive is a joint venture between designer Henrik Fisker, former GM Vice Chairman Bob Lutz and businessman Gilbert Villarreal. Lutz and Villarreal began VL automotive in 2012, and in 2013 unveiled the VLF Destino, a luxury automobile based on Fisker's Karma electric car. VLF did away with the Karma's fully electric powertrain and replaced it with the 6.2 L LS9 V8 engine used in the Chevrolet Corvette ZR1. Eventually Fisker joined the team, and VL automotive became VLF automotive. VLF then began work on a new automobile built around the 8.4 L Viper V10 engine, which would become the Force 1 V10.

In 2015, Fisker met racing driver and Viper enthusiast Ben Keating. Fisker and VLF partnered with Keating during the development of the Force 1. Keating drew on his Viper racing experience to design the Force 1's active suspension, which makes nearly 10,000 adjustments per second. This results in better traction and a significantly improved ride when compared with the Viper.

== Design and specifications ==
=== Engine ===
The Force 1 V10 utilizes an 8.4 liter V10 engine used in the fifth generation Dodge Viper. The standard output for this engine is 640 hp (477 kW) and 600 lbf⋅ft (813 N⋅m) of torque. VLF significantly increased the engine's output for the Force 1, and the engine was now rated at 745 hp (556 kW) and 638 lbf⋅ft (865 N⋅m) of torque (an increase of 14% and 5%, respectively). This results in a top speed of 218 mph (351 km/h) and a 0-60 mph (97 km/h) acceleration time of 3.0 seconds.

The engine of the Force 1 V10 is placed between the cabin and the front axle, with the engine's center of mass located behind the front axle. This is meant to improve the vehicle's handling by modifying weight distribution.

The Force 1 comes standard with a six-speed manual transmission, but an optional six-speed paddle-shift automatic would be available on request.

=== Body ===
The Force 1's exterior was designed by Henrik Fisker, known for his work on the design of the BMW Z8 and Aston Martin DB9, among other automobiles. The Force 1 shares many basic design features with other American sports cars, and in particular the Dodge Viper (with which it shares the basic chassis). It features an elongated hood, a long tapered rear section, and protruding wheels, and has a body made entirely of carbon fiber. The Force 1 has a sharp, angled front side which also sports six functional intake and outlet vents. The rear of the car is more curved and contains a large outlet vent. Force 1 also features ultra-thin lights at both the front and the rear. The front and roof spoilers, as well as the rear diffuser, are made of exposed, polished carbon fiber. The roof spoiler also contains the on-board Wi-Fi hotspot antenna and a third brake light.

=== Interior ===
The interior is designed for two people and is trimmed in leather, suede and Alcantara. Other features include a milled aluminum and leather gear shifter, leather and suede sunglasses holder, and a hidden milled aluminum pen holder. The Force 1 also features a substantial technology suite, including in-dash navigation, smart phone connectivity and charging, and a Wi-Fi hotspot housed in the rear spoiler. It is also fitted with a champagne holder, with a two bottle capacity, located between the two seat backs.

=== Wheels ===
The Force 1 V10 is fitted with 21 in (533 mm) aluminum four-spoke wheels, with a width of 10.5 in (267 mm) in the front and 13 in (330 mm) in back. The Pirelli P Zero high-performance tires are sized at 305/25/ZR21 in the front with 355/25/ZR21 in the rear. The Force 1 V10 is outfitted with Brembo high performance brakes.

== Production ==
After debuting at the 2016 Detroit Auto Show, it was announced that an initial run of 50 cars was planned in 2016. The first two units, including the vehicle displayed at the 2016 Detroit Auto Show, took only 10 weeks to build, and Bob Lutz claimed the initial development only required $10 million in investment. Production took place at VLF's Auburn Hills, Michigan manufacturing facility beginning in April 2016. Deliveries were planned for Q3 of 2016. As part of the partnership with Ben Keating, all 50 units would be exclusively available through Keating's Viper Exchange dealership. Prices for the Force 1 V10 would start at $286,500. VLF had future plans to distribute both the Force 1 V10 and the VL Destino through a small group of domestic dealerships, though no plans to create exclusive dealerships were made. Only five cars were actually produced.
