= VLF Automotive =

American automotive company

- Industry: Automotive
- Founded: 2012; 14 years ago
- Founder: Bob Lutz; Gilbert Villarreal
- Products: VLF Destino; VLF Force 1 V10
- Website: vlfautomotive.com

VLF Automotive was a small American-based automotive company formed in January 2016. It was founded as VL Automotive in 2012 by Bob Lutz and Gilbert Villarreal, then renamed after Henrik Fisker joined the company.

GreenTech Automotive merged with VL Automotive in 2014. GreenTech produced few cars, if any. It declared bankruptcy in February 2018.

== Company history ==
The company was founded by designer and entrepreneur Henrik Fisker, ex-General Motors vice-chairman Bob Lutz and industrialist Gilbert Villarreal. The company's name is taken from the initials of their surnames.

In 2013 they displayed the Destino, its first model, based on the Fisker Karma, at the North American International Auto Show in Detroit.

GreenTech Automotive merged with VL Automotive in 2014. GreenTech produced few cars, if any. It declared bankruptcy in February 2018.

As of May 2025, the company website is no longer operational.

== Products ==
=== VLF Destino ===
The VLF Destino four-door sedan was first shown in January 2013, heavily based on the Fisker Karma, but fitted with a 6.2 L V8 gasoline engine rather than the electric power of the Karma.

Sales of the Destino were scheduled to commence in the second half of 2015, with cars to be built in Auburn Hills in Michigan, but the company only obtained 20 Fisker Karma "gliders" and reported 100 orders by May 2013. At the January 2014 Detroit Autoshow, the company announced that production was delayed due to the ongoing restructuring of Fisker.

=== VLF Force 1 ===
The company announced production of a limited edition 745 HP American sports car Force 1 V10, limited to 50 by third quarter 2016. The car was a Coach Built Dodge Viper. In 2016 they debuted the Force 1, a 745 hp American sports car at the North American International Auto Show.

=== VLF Rocket V8 ===
In 2018, VLF partnered with Galpin Auto Sports to produce the Rocket V8, a coach built Ford Mustang that was to be co built by both VLF and Galpin Auto Sports.

=== HUMVEE C-Series ===
Beginning in 2017, VLF was contracting a version of the HMMWV/Hummer H1 for the non-Americas market with limited run of 100 units per year via contract from AM General. Markets include China, Europe and the Middle East. AM General had announced offering the C-Series as a kit for sale in 2012, but cancelled the project.

== See also ==
- Henrik Fisker
- Bob Lutz
- Fisker Coachbuild (2005–2007)
- Fisker Automotive (2007–2014)
- VIA Motors
