= Dodge Viper (VX I) =

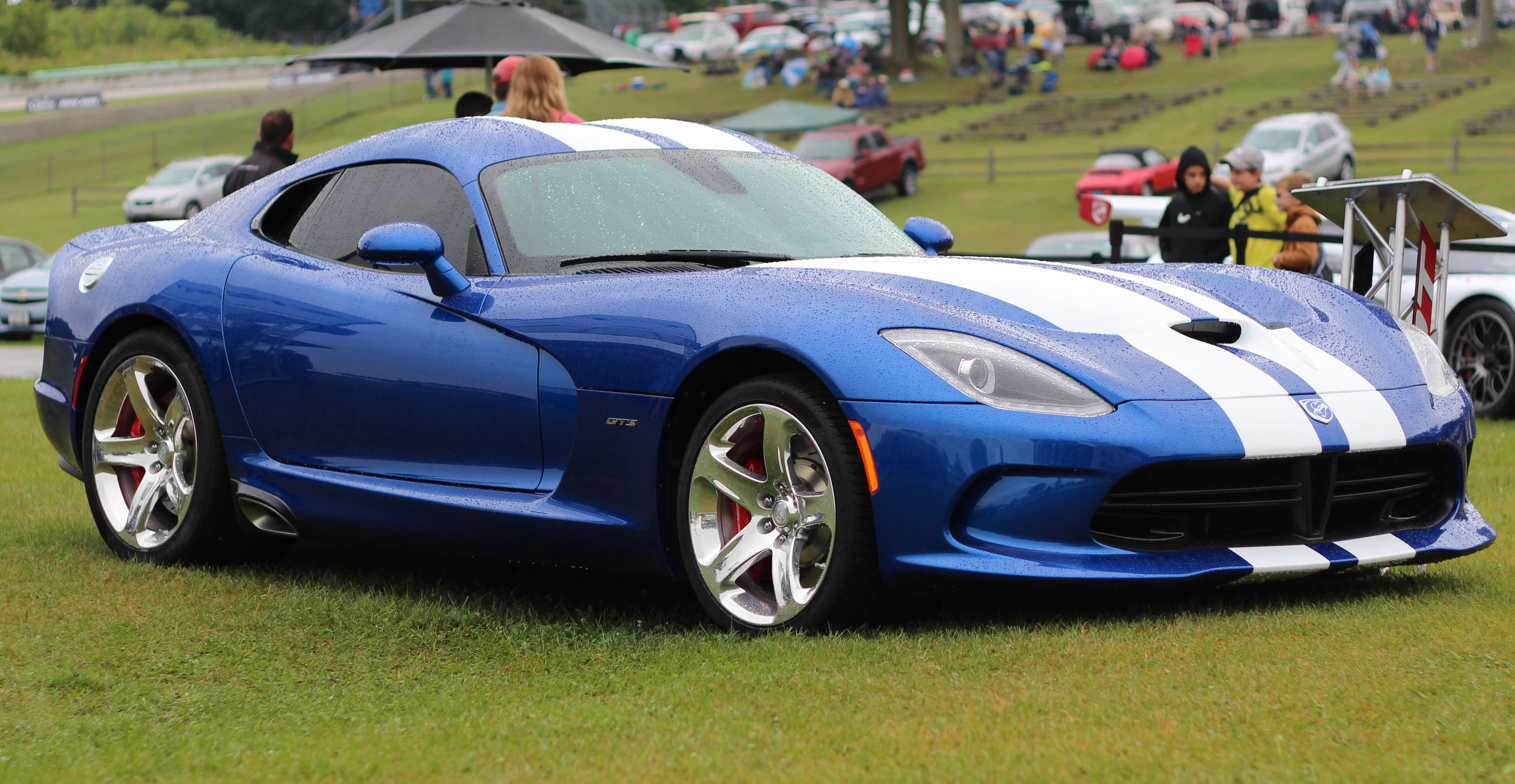

Overview
- Manufacturer: FCA US LLC
- Also called: SRT Viper (2013–2014)
- Production: 2012–2017; 2,427 units
- Model years: 2013–2017
- Assembly: Conner Avenue Assembly, Detroit, Michigan, United States
- Designer: Scott Krugger (2010)

Body and chassis
- Class: Sports car (S)
- Body style: 2-door liftback coupé
- Layout: Front mid-engine, rear-wheel-drive
- Related: VLF Force 1

Powertrain
- Engine: Odd-firing 8.4 L (512 cu in) Viper EWF/EWG V10
- Power output: 645–650 hp (481–485 kW) at 6,200 rpm (640 hp in 2013–2014); 600 lb⋅ft (813 N⋅m) at 5,000 rpm
- Transmission: 6-speed Tremec TR-6060 manual

Dimensions
- Wheelbase: 98.9 in (2,510 mm)
- Length: 175.7 in (4,460 mm)
- Width: 76.4 in (1,940 mm)
- Height: 49.1 in (1,250 mm)
- Curb weight: Base: 3,354 lb (1,521 kg); Base (with SRT Track Package): 3,297 lb (1,495 kg); GTS and ACR: 3,431 lb (1,556 kg); GTS (with SRT Track Package): 3,374 lb (1,530 kg)

Chronology
- Predecessor: Dodge Viper (ZB II)

The Dodge Viper (VX I) (marketed as SRT Viper in 2013 and 2014) is the fifth and final generation of the Viper sports car. Introduced in the 2013 model year, the car was entirely redesigned and included features such as an anti-lock braking system, electronic stability control and traction control that made the car compatible to modern vehicle safety standards. The discontinuation of production of the VX I in August 2017 marked the culmination of the Viper sports car.

== History and development ==
At a dealer conference on September 14, 2010 in Orlando, Florida, the then-Chrysler Group and Fiat CEO Sergio Marchionne was reported to have concluded his remarks by unveiling a rolling 2012 Dodge Viper prototype. There would be cars produced for the 2011 model year. In autumn of 2011, SRT executive Ralph Gilles announced that the next generation of the Viper would debut at the New York Auto Show in April 2012. At the 2013 New York International Auto Show, the all new SRT Viper GTS was unveiled along with plans to enter the car into racing as well.

As part of Chrysler's plan of turning SRT as a separate vehicle brand within Chrysler Group LLC, the SRT Viper became the brand's halo vehicle. In May 2014, the SRT brand was re-consolidated under Dodge, with former SRT CEO Ralph Gilles continuing as senior vice president of product design and also as the CEO and president of Motorsports. The car was renamed back to Dodge Viper in 2015.

== Specifications and performance ==
SRT initially offered two versions of the Viper; the SRT Viper and the GTS. The GTS is the premium model offering more creature comforts over the base model. The most notable exterior difference between the two models is the hood. The base model has six functional hood vents while the GTS model only has two. To commemorate the return of the Viper, SRT offered a 'launch edition' package available on 150 GTS models in 2013. All of the launch edition cars were painted in Viper Blue with twin white stripes and came with a serialized dash plaque placed inside their cabins. The interior of the launch edition cars was trimmed in Black Laguna leather with contrast stitching.

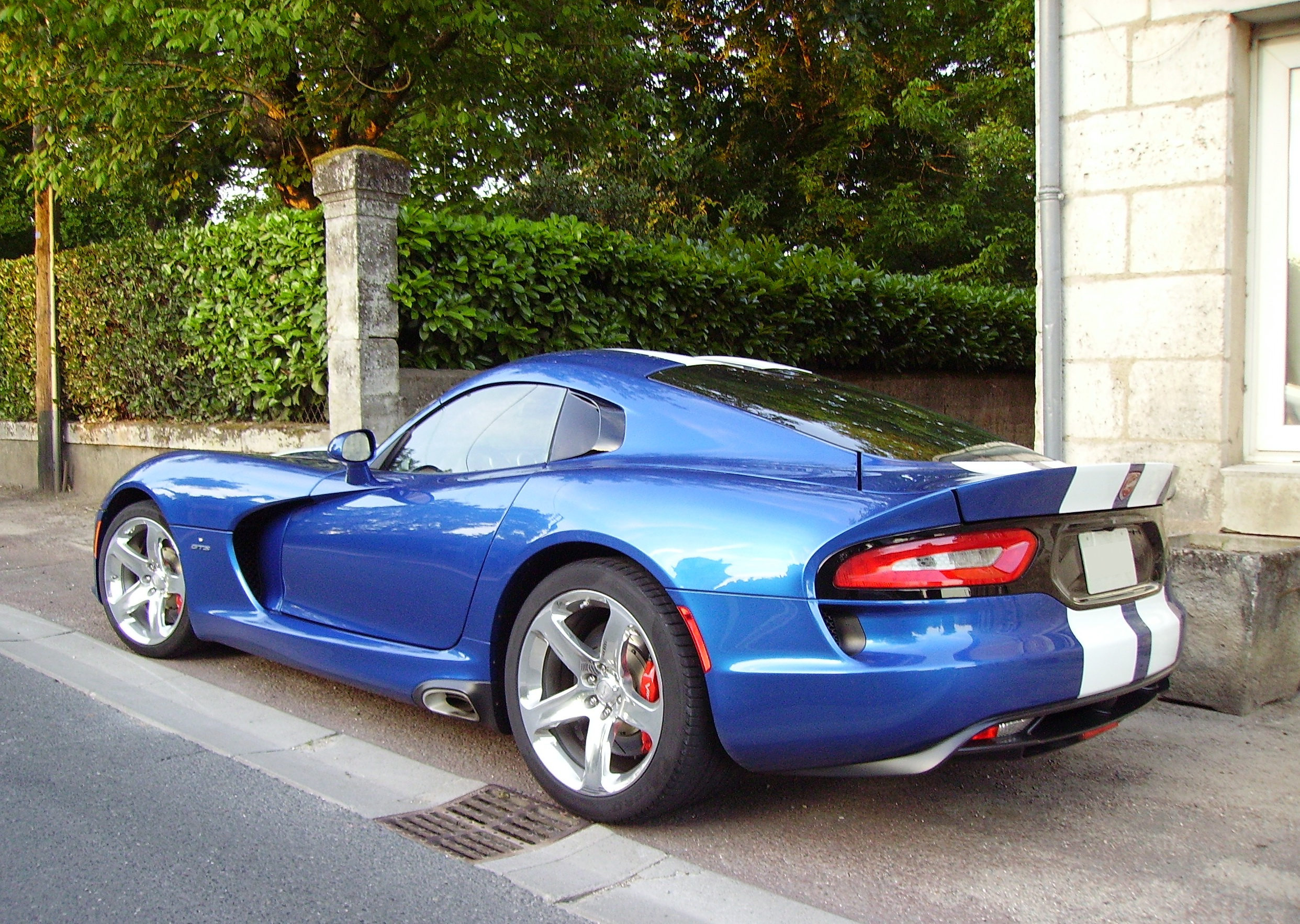
Rear

The SRT Viper GTS includes leather upholstery, accented colors on the seats, doors, center console and stitching; gun metal trim on the cluster bezel, HVAC outlets, window switch bezels, shifter base, park brake bezel and the integrated passenger grab handle on the center console; Sabelt racing seats with Kevlar and fiberglass shell, carbon-fiber hood, roof, decklid and aluminum door panels, split six-spoke forged aluminum "Venom" wheels with polished face and graphite-painted pockets (standard), fully painted Hyper Black or fully painted low-gloss black finished wheels.

The SRT Viper includes cruise control and controls on the steering wheel. It also features an Alpine surround sound system with an 8.4-inch display with an optional navigation system by Garmin, Sirius-XM satellite radio, and HD radio. The gauge cluster features a four-inch reconfigurable TFT display for vehicle information as well as a "Track Mode" with a built-in track timer, "stoplight" countdown timer display, and other features. Power seats, keyless entry, and heated seats are also new options. A built-in HDD for storing music and photos was also included as standard equipment.

The optional SRT Track Package includes Pirelli P Zero Corsa tires, StopTech slotted two-piece brake rotors and lightweight wheels in Hyper Black or matte black finishes.

Dodge introduced a new GT package in 2015 to fill the gap between the base Viper and the GTS model. The GT package included the two-mode, driver-adjustable suspension and five-mode electronic stability control system from the GTS, along with Nappa leather seats with Alcantara accents and contrast stitching.

The Viper (VX I) is powered by an all-aluminium 8,382 cc (8.4 L; 511.5 cu in) V10 engine. The engine initially generated 640 hp (477 kW; 649 PS) at 6,150 rpm and 600 lb⋅ft (813 N⋅m) of torque at 4,950 rpm but in 2015, power was raised by 5 hp for a total of 645 hp (481 kW).

The Viper could accelerate from 0–60 mph (0–97 km/h) in 3.5 seconds and could attain a top speed of 206 mph (332 km/h).

== Models and special editions ==
=== TA ===
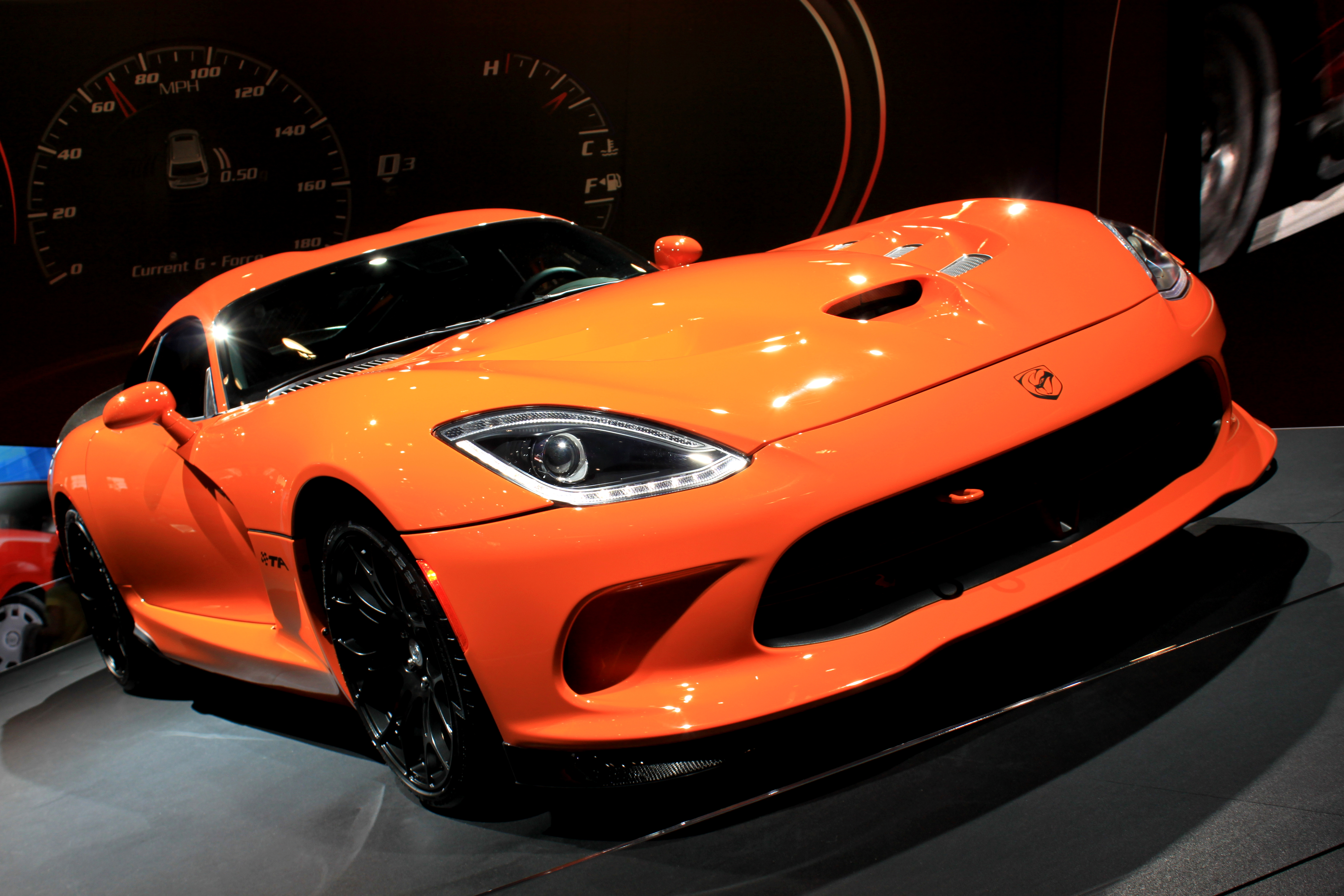
2014 SRT VIPER TA

==== TA 1.0 ====
The Time Attack (TA) model was introduced in 2013 and had two variants, 1.0 and 2.0, each variant different from the other. The 1.0 was sold by SRT and was made as a small enhancement for the Viper GTS.

The engine received no modifications and was rated at 645 hp (481 kW; 654 PS) and 600 lb⋅ft (813 N⋅m), the same as the standard car, but the car's aerodynamic additions reduced the top speed to 193 mph (311 km/h).

The car now had the addition of the Advanced Aerodynamic Package (two-piece front corner splitters and a rear decklid spoiler made from carbon fiber), lightweight Sidewinder II wheels finished in matte-black, Pirelli P Zero Corsa tires, two-mode Bilstein DampTronic suspension adapted from the GTS, but with firmer levels of damping and a smaller spread between modes, shock dampers, increased spring rates and thicker anti-roll bars, carbon fiber (instead of aluminum) underhood X-brace, carbon fiber rear tail light applique from the Exterior Carbon Fiber Accent Package, two-piece Brembo brake rotors with wider brake annulus, black-anodized Brembo brake calipers painted with the Viper logo in TA Orange, TA logos behind both front wheels and a Stryker decal instead of the standard badge on the hood. Black interior with TA Orange accent stitching on the ballistic cloth seats, instrument panel & cowl, center stack, console, hand brake, shifter boot, and door panels. The aerodynamic package adds 200 pounds (91 kg) of downforce at 100 mph (160 km/h).159 examples produced with 33 in Venom Black, 33 in Bright White and 93 in TA Orange.

On March 18, 2013 MotorTrend tested the SRT Viper TA at Mazda Raceway Laguna Seca, setting the production car lap record in 1:33.62, besting the previous lap time holder Chevrolet Corvette ZR1's 1:33.70 lap time.

==== TA 2.0 ====
Along with the Viper's return to the Dodge brand, the TA 2.0 variant was added for the 2015 model year (the TA 1.0 was still available up to and including the last model year, 2017). The TA 2.0 variant included an updated aero package, comprising a bigger rear wing, new front dive planes, and a new carbon-fiber front splitter. The package improves downforce to 400 pounds at 150 mph versus the 2014 Viper TA 1.0's 278 pounds at 150 mph. Other upgrades included an improved suspension setup, new two-piece Brembo rotors, an improved X-brand, and improved shocks, dampers, springs, and stabilizer bars. The interior received fiberglass racing seats fitted with vinyl and contrast orange stitching and three exterior color options would be available; Competition Blue, Venom Black or Y’Orange. Unlike the TA 1.0, the TA 2.0 retained the 206 mph (332 km/h) top speed of the standard car. The car's fuel mileage was improved in the 2.0 version, with 13 mpg in city, and 20 mpg on the highway.

=== ACR ===
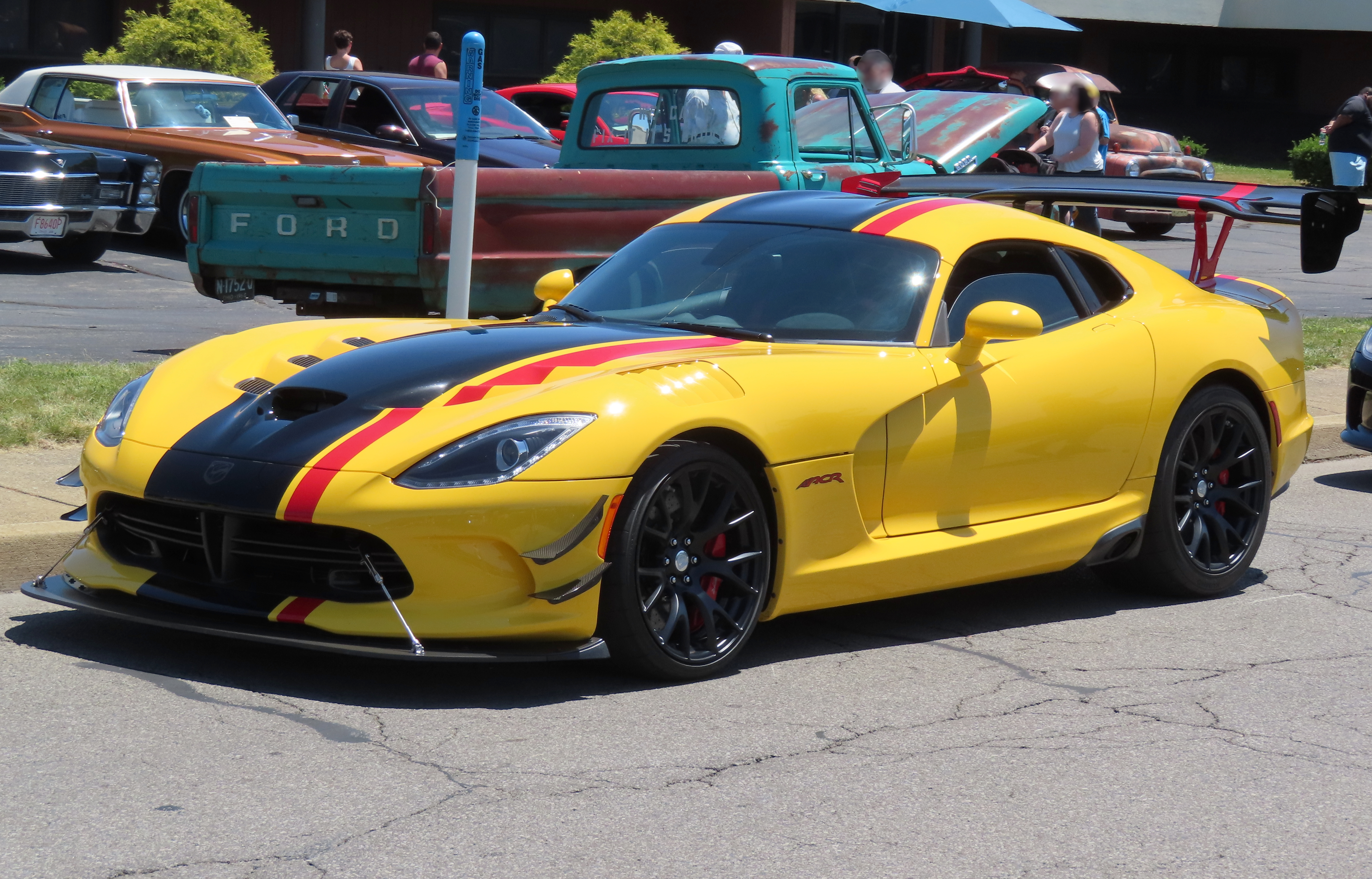
Dodge Viper ACR

At SEMA 2014, Dodge presented a Viper ACR concept car based on the new VX I platform. The car was eventually introduced in 2015 for the 2016 model year. The base price of the 2016 ACR was US$121,395 in the United States and CA$159,995 in Canada.

The 2016 Viper ACR came installed with an all-new aerodynamic body kit made from carbon fiber, that included a new front splitter and a fixed carbon fiber rear wing, altogether producing a total of 1,533 lb (695 kg) of downforce. The 8,382 cc (8.4 L; 511.5 cu in) Viper V10 engine generated the same power output of 645 hp (481 kW; 654 PS) at 6,200 rpm and 600 lb⋅ft (813 N⋅m) of torque at 5,000 rpm as in all other Viper trims. The braking system was supplied by Brembo and comprises 391 mm (15.4 in) discs with 6-piston calipers up front, and 360 mm (14.2 in) discs with 4-piston calipers at the rear. The discs were now carbon ceramic, a first for the Viper. The ACR was equipped with Kumho Ecsta V720 ACR tires, a variant of the V720 specifically manufactured for the ACR. The front tires are P295/25R19Z, slightly smaller than the regular Viper, and P355/30R19Z at the rear. The suspension system is manufactured by Bilstein, and has 10 settings for rebound and compression tuning for the dampers.

Options included the ACR Extreme Aero Package, which helped the car break a total of 13 track lap records. The package included the addition of a removable front splitter extension, a new adjustable dual-element rear wing, four dive planes, six removable diffuser strakes, removable brake ducts, and removable hood louvers, and if removed, will reveal a hood gap. This helped the car produce up to 1,710 lb (776 kg) of downforce. The Extreme Aero package reduced the ACR's top speed to just 177 mph (285 km/h), instead of 206 mph (332 km/h), due to the 0.54 coefficient of drag (vs 0.37 for the standard Viper).

=== GTC ===
The GTC model was introduced in 2015, and had a customization program that offered 8,000 colors and 24,000 hand-painted stripes, 10 wheel choices, 16 interior trims, 6 aero options, and an undisclosed amount of standalone options to choose from. There were a total of 25 million possible build combinations.

Ordering a GTC enrolled a customer in a unique VIP program called Viper Concierge, which according to Dodge, "offers an exclusive point of contact throughout the custom Viper build process." The Concierge process started with the ordering stage, which included Dodge sending customers a paint chip confirming the owner's choice. Shortly thereafter, Dodge sent buyers a 1:18-scale "speed-form" replica in their chosen custom colors, to confirm or deny the build. Once the buyer's color and option selection was locked-in, that car became a one-of-one Viper for that year – no other buyer would be permitted to build a Viper to the same specifications.

== Production ==
Sales of the Viper in 2013 and 2014 were poor. Production was reduced by 1/3 in October 2013 and then halted for two months in April 2014 amid slow sales.

In October 2015, Fiat Chrysler group announced that the Viper would end production in 2017. Initially, Fiat Chrysler cited poor sales as a reason for discontinuing the Viper; however, other sources have stated the car was discontinued because the Viper was unable to comply with FMVSS 226 safety regulations, which requires side-curtain airbags. In July 2017, Fiat Chrysler announced they would be permanently closing the Conner Assembly Plant on August 31, 2017.

Chrysler announced five special edition Vipers for the final model year of production.

In total, 2,427 fifth-generation Vipers were produced from 2013 through 2017.

== Lap records ==
In October 2015, the ACR achieved a 7:01.67s laptime at the Nürburgring Nordschleife with the Extreme Aero Package, which was run by SRT, and lapped by their test driver Dominik Farnbacher. Unfortunately, the lap was unofficial according to SRT.

A crowdfunding attempt started by volunteer Russ Oasis in 2017 on the GoFundMe funding platform began collecting funds to reclaim the lap record on the Nürburgring. Crowdfunding ended up being as high as $198,000. He eventually found himself supported by 377 people, and sponsorship and assistance from Kumho Tire (tire supplier), Prefix Performance (formally known as Arrow Racing Engines) (logistics and parts supplier), ViperExchange (car loaners), and Fox Pro Films (lap filming). SRT test driver, racing driver, and former Nürburgring record holder Dominik Farnbacher returned to the track to help the group retake the record. Racing drivers Luca Stolz, Mario Farnbacher, and Lance David Arnold came in as well. Their target was the second position in street legal vehicles category. The Lamborghini Huracán Performante holding the position at that time had a lap time of 6:52.01. The group went through three attempts, with the lap times of 7:03.45 (set by Dominik Farnbacher), 7:03.23 (set by Mario Farnbacher), and 7:01.30 (set by Lance David Arnold), respectively. Their third record-attempting rip to Nürburg, Germany ended after one of the Viper ACRs was crashed as a result of a tire failure. Despite the failure of surpassing the Huracán Performante, the team was still able to make the Viper ACR the fastest American, rear-wheel drive, manual transmission equipped car to go around the track. This lap time also brought the car to fifth position for street legal vehicles in 2017.

Track	Lap Time	Driver	Model
Mazda Raceway Laguna Seca	1:33.62	Randy Pobst	TA
Mazda Raceway Laguna Seca	1:28.65	Randy Pobst	ACR
Waterford Hills Road Racing Track	1:10.89	Chris Winkler	ACR
Road Atlanta	1:26.54	Chris Winkler	ACR
Nelson Ledges Road Course	1:06.21	Chris Winkler	ACR
R&T Motown Mile	0:51.17	Chris Winkler	ACR
Gingerman Raceway	1:31.91	Chris Winkler	ACR
Pittsburgh International Race Complex	0:58.37	Chris Winkler	ACR
Grattan Raceway	1:22.09	Chris Winkler	ACR
Virginia International Raceway - Grand Course	2:40.02	Chris Winkler	ACR
Willow Springs International Motorsports Park	1:21.24	Chris Winkler	ACR
Buttonwillow Raceway Park	1:47.70	Chris Winkler	ACR
Inde Motorsports Ranch	1:33.75	Chris Winkler	ACR
Chrysler Chelsea Proving Grounds	1:05.53	Chris Winkler	ACR
MotorSport Ranch	1:16.98	Tommy Kendall	ACR
Nürburgring Nordschleife	7:01.30	Lance David Arnold	ACR
