= BMW E1 =

BMW concept vehicles

BMW E1 is the name of two electric/hybrid city car concepts by German automobile manufacturer BMW, revealed at the 1991 then 1993 International Motor Show Germany.

== First generation (Z11; 1991) ==
BMW E1 (Z11)

Overview
- Manufacturer: BMW
- Production: 1991
- Designer: Mark Clarke, Henrik Fisker (1991)

Body and chassis
- Class: City car (A)
- Body style: 3-door hatchback

Powertrain
- Battery: 19 kWh sodium sulphate battery

Dimensions
- Length: 3,460 mm (136 in)
- Width: 1,648 mm (64.9 in)
- Height: ~1,500 mm (59 in)

Chronology
- Successor: BMW E1 (Z15)

The first-generation BMW E1 prototype, the Z11, was revealed in 1991, and was all-electric. Only one example of this car was built.

=== Overview ===
The Z11-gen BMW E1 concept was revealed at the 1991 International Motor Show Germany in Frankfurt, Germany. It was a fully-functional 3-door, 4-seat electric city car. The E1 initially began development in 1990 with Technik, a division of BMW started in 1985, created to develop new technologies for cars. It was designed to test if a production electric car would work, partly due to the U.S. state of California's demand that 2% of new cars sold in the state be zero emission. This is the same reason for the creation of the General Motors EV1.

=== Specifications ===
The Z11 E1 concept was powered by a 19 kWh sodium sulphate battery, which in turn powered a direct-drive motor on the rear axle, giving the car a total output of 45 bhp and 111 lb ft. of torque. The E1 had a range of 155 miles (249 km) and two-hour rapid charging. The structure of the car was made from aluminum while the body was made from recycled plastic and was finished in a bright red paint. The car used custom-built alloy wheels, which were 14 in (360 mm) in the front and 16 in (410 mm) in the back.

=== Replacement ===
The only Z11-gen E1 concept was destroyed in a fire that occurred while it was charging, and was replaced by a new concept for 1993.

== Second generation (Z15; 1993) ==
BMW E1 (Z15)
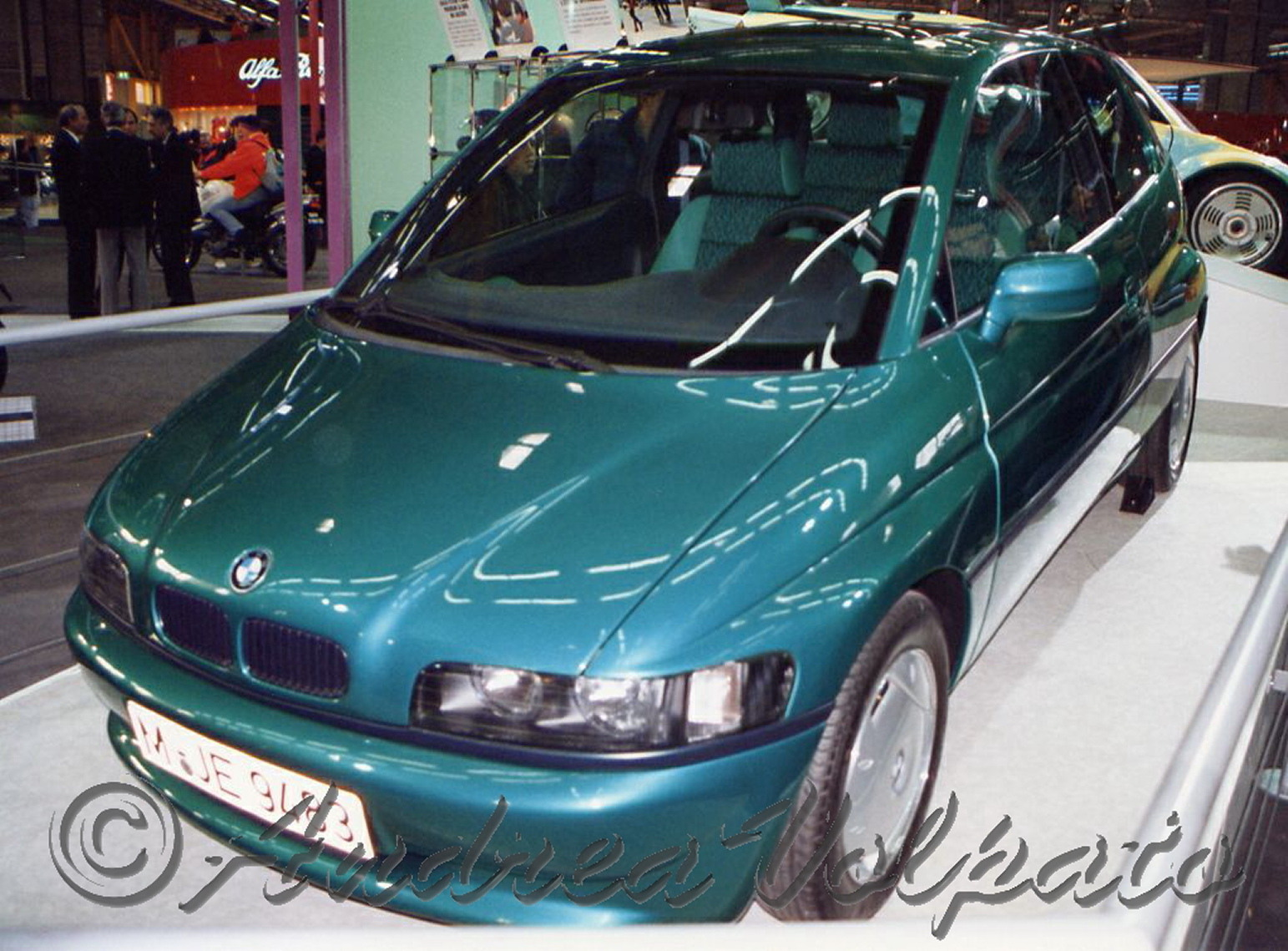
- 1993 BMW E1 at Motorshow di Bologna (front)

Overview
- Manufacturer: BMW
- Also called: BMW E2
- Production: 1993 (2 built; one EV and one hybrid)
- Designer: Mark Clarke (1993)

Body and chassis
- Class: City car (A)
- Body style: 3-door hatchback

Powertrain
- Engine: 4-cylinder engine
- Transmission: 5-speed manual (hybrid variant) automatic
- Battery: 19.2 kWh Sodium nickel chloride battery

Chronology
- Predecessor: BMW E1 (Z11)
- Successor: BMW i3 (spiritual)

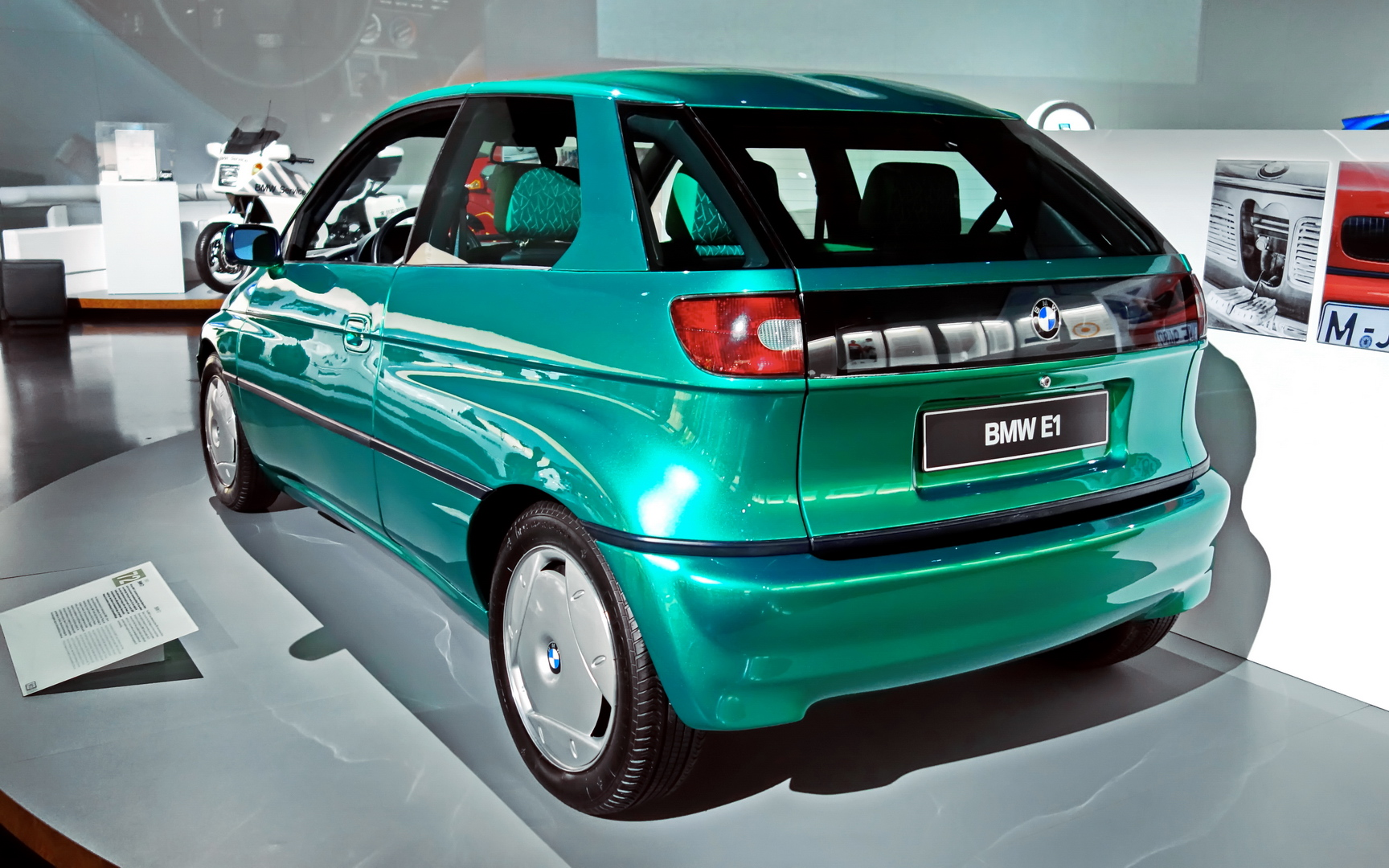
1993 BMW E1 at the BMW Museum (rear)

The second-generation BMW E1 prototype, the Z15, was revealed in 1993 at International Motor Show Germany on September 9, 1993. Two examples of the car were built; an all-electric version and a hybrid version. The Z15, like the previous Z11, was also a 3-door city car that seats four passengers.

=== Specifications ===
The electric version is powered by a 19.2 kWh sodium nickel chloride battery and has a top speed of 80 mph (130 km/h). It is finished in a green metallic paint and features a green interior.

The hybrid version also uses the 4-cylinder internal combustion engine used in the BMW K1100 motorcycle and a 5-speed manual transmission, and has an output of 82 hp. This variant is painted red.

Both examples of the Z15-gen E1 feature a similar lightweight body to that of the Z11, which is made of aluminum and plastic.

== Legacy ==
Although the E1 was never produced, BMW introduced the ICE-powered 1993 3 Series Compact, featuring similar styling to the Z11, two years after the Z11 E1 concept's revealing. Furthermore, BMW did eventually introduce an electric city car, the i3, in 2013, 20 years after the Z15 concept. The Z15 concept remains at the BMW Museum in Munich.
