= Federal Motor Vehicle Safety Standard 226 =

Regulates automotive ejection mitigation in the U.S.

Federal Motor Vehicle Safety Standard 226 (FMVSS 226) regulates automotive ejection mitigation in the United States. Like all other Federal Motor Vehicle Safety Standards, FMVSS 226 is administered by the United States Department of Transportation's National Highway Traffic Safety Administration.

This standard establishes requirements for ejection mitigation systems to reduce the likelihood of complete and partial ejections of vehicle occupants through side windows during rollovers or side impact events. The standard applies to the side windows next to the first three rows of seats, and to a portion of the cargo area behind the first or second rows, in motor vehicles with a gross vehicle weight rating (GVWR) of 10,000 lb (4,500 kg) or less except walk-in vans, modified roof vehicles and convertibles.

Many automotive insiders believe this standard led to the demise of the Dodge Viper.

== Phase-in schedule ==
	Primary phase-in schedule		
Phase-in year	Produced after August 31	Produced before September 1	% of manufacturer's vehicles certified to S4.2
1	2013	2014	25
2	2014	2015	50
3	2015	2016	75
4	2016	2017	100

== See also ==
- Airbag
- FMVSS
