= Viper Exchange Racing =

- Owner: Ben Keating
- Base: Tomball, Texas
- Series: Tudor United SportsCar Championship
- Race drivers: Ben Keating; Jeroen Bleekemolen; Al Carter; Marc Goossens; Cameron Lawrence
- Manufacturer: Dodge

Viper Exchange Racing is an American auto racing team. The team, in partnership with Riley Motorsport and TI Automotive, runs two cars in the IMSA Tudor United SportsCar Championship, both Dodge Vipers racing in the GTD class . The No. 33 Viper has scored two victories since the beginning of the 2014 season along with two further top-five finishes. The No. 93 Viper, added in 2015, has added two victories and another top-five finish during the current season. In 2015, Viper Exchange Racing was granted an entry in the 24 Hours of Le Mans, and the No. 53 SRT Viper GTS-R was the only Viper to run in the event.

== Tudor United SportsCar Championship ==
=== No. 33 Car ===
==== 2014 ====
In 2014, the American Le Mans Series and Rolex Sports Car Series merged to form the Tudor United SportsCar Championship. Viper Exchange Racing entered into this new series with the No.33 team, with team owner Ben Keating joining with Dutch siblings Jeroen and Sebastiaan Bleekemolen in the Dodge Viper GT3-R. Joined by French driver Emmanuel Collard, Keating and the Bleekemolen brothers competed in the opening event, the 24 Hours of Daytona, completing 615 laps over the day long event, finishing 19th (40th overall). During the subsequent event, the Twelve Hours of Sebring, Keating was driving the No. 33 Viper on the 13th lap when the Viper's driveshaft disconnect from the rear axle, severing a fuel line and starting a fire. After noticing the fire, Keating was able to stop and exit the vehicle without injury, although the team was forced to retire from the race. The No. 33 car was up and running again under 2 months later for the event at Laguna Seca, as Keating and Jeroen Bleekemolen completed the 2 hour race. Keating and Jeroen recorded their first win of the series three races later at the SportsCar Grand Prix. They would go on to record Top Five finishes in the next two races, placing third in the Brickyard Grand Prix (Indianapolis Motor Speedway) and fourth in the Road America 500. The No. 33 team would record their second win of the season with a win at the Circuit of the Americas. After the final race of the season at Road Atlanta, the No. 33 team would finish 11th in the final points standings, with 249 total points.

2014 Tudor United SportsCar Championship results, No 33. Car
Event	Class	No	Team	Car	Co-drivers	Laps	Position	Class Pos.
Daytona	GTD	33	(United States) Riley Motorsports	SRT Viper GT3-R	(United States) Ben Keating (Monaco) Jeroen Bleekemolen (Netherlands) Sebastiaan Bleekemolen (France) Emmanuel Collard	615	40	19
Sebring	GTD	33	(United States) Riley Motorsports	SRT Viper GT3-R	(United States) Ben Keating (Monaco) Jeroen Bleekemolen (Netherlands) Sebastiaan Bleekemolen	13	62	24
Monterey	GTD	33	(United States) Riley Motorsports	SRT Viper GT3-R	(United States) Ben Keating (Monaco) Jeroen Bleekemolen	76	23	16
Belle Isle	GTD	33	(United States) Riley Motorsports	SRT Viper GT3-R	(United States) Ben Keating (Monaco) Jeroen Bleekemolen	55	17	10
Watkins Glen	GTD	33	(United States) Riley Motorsports	SRT Viper GT3-R	(United States) Ben Keating (Monaco) Jeroen Bleekemolen	91	49	17
Mosport	GTD	33	(United States) Riley Motorsports	SRT Viper GT3-R	(United States) Ben Keating (Monaco) Jeroen Bleekemolen	121	17	1
Indy	GTD	33	(United States) Riley Motorsports	SRT Viper GT3-R	(United States) Ben Keating (Monaco) Jeroen Bleekemolen	101	27	3
Road America	GTD	33	(United States) Riley Motorsports	SRT Viper GT3-R	(United States) Ben Keating (Monaco) Jeroen Bleekemolen	59	29	4
VIR	GTD	33	(United States) Riley Motorsports	SRT Viper GT3-R	(United States) Ben Keating (United States) Tony Ave	80	21	13
COTA	GTD	33	(United States) Riley Motorsports	SRT Viper GT3-R	(United States) Ben Keating (Monaco) Jeroen Bleekemolen	73	28	1
Road Atlanta	GTD	33	(United States) Riley Motorsports	SRT Viper GT3-R	(United States) Ben Keating (Monaco) Jeroen Bleekemolen (Netherlands) Sebastiaan Bleekemolen	166	45	17

==== 2015 ====
Viper Exchange Racing continued to sponsor the No. 33 Viper during the 2015 Tudor United SportsCar Championship season. The car was once again co-driven primarily by Ben Keating and Jeroen Bleekemolen. During the season's inaugural race, the 2015 24 Hours of Daytona, Keating and Bleekemolen were joined by Al Carter and Marc Goossens in the No.33 car. Both Keating and Carter would also take a shift in the other Viper Exchange car, the No. 93 Viper. The No. 33 and No. 93 Vipers both maintained positions near the front of the pack in the early goings of the race. However the No. 33 car began to experience electrical issues, and fell out of contention for the lead. The No. 33 Viper was eventually forced to retire after 674 laps (during the race's final hour), finishing 9th in class. The No. 33 next competed in the 2015 Twelve Hours of Sebring, with Jeroen's brother Sebastiaan joining Jeroen and Keating as co-driver. The team seemed poised for a win, leading with under 10 minutes to go, when a radiator issue forced the No. 33 to pit, leading to a 9th-place finish for the team. The misfortune for the No. 33 car continued during the subsequent events, as a storm drain grate that was jutting out of the track did massive damage to the right side of the Viper during the first few laps of the Monterey Grand Prix, and then the No. 33 car was forced to pit for significant repairs early at Belle Isle after damage to the oil tank. The team would experience another early issue at the 2015 Six Hours of The Glen, but were able to recover and finish the race in the 6th place overall. Finally free of technical issues, the No. 33 team rebounded with a second-place finish at the 2015 Northeast Grand Prix, finishing just three and a half seconds behind the leader. Keating and Bleekemolen followed up with another strong performance and snagged their first class win of the year in the Continental Tire Road Race Showcase at Road America. With that win, the Viper Exchange Racing became the only two-car team with wins for both of its cars (the No. 93 recorded wins at Daytona and Watkins Glen). As a result of their win at Road America, the No. 33 car was placed under some competitive restrictions limiting the performance of the car during the next race, the Oak Tree Grand Prix at VIR. These restrictions limited the No. 33 Viper to a 7th-place finish, breaking the team's string of consecutive podium finishes. The No. 33 team would come back strong though, and charged back into the winner's circle with a come-from-behind victory at Circuit of the Americas. For the season's final race, the 2015 Petit Le Mans at Road Atlanta, Sebastiaan Bleekemolen joined Keating and brother Jeroen in the No. 33 Viper. Unfortunately, an early spin-out on the rain-soaked track resulted in a lap deficit the team could not overcome, and the No. 33 car finished 12th in class.

2015 Tudor United SportsCar Championship results, No. 33 Car
Event	Class	No	Team	Car	Co-drivers	Laps	Position	Class Pos.
Daytona	GTD	33	(United States) Riley Motorsports	SRT Viper GT3-R	(United States) Ben Keating (Monaco) Jeroen Bleekemolen (United States) Al Carter (Belgium) Marc Goossens	674	21	9
Sebring	GTD	33	(United States) Riley Motorsports	SRT Viper GT3-R	(United States) Ben Keating (Monaco) Jeroen Bleekemolen (Netherlands) Sebastiaan Bleekemolen	314	26	9
Monterey	GTD	33	(United States) Riley Motorsports	SRT Viper GT3-R	(United States) Ben Keating (Monaco) Jeroen Bleekemolen	97	32	11
Belle Isle	GTD	33	(United States) Riley Motorsports	SRT Viper GT3-R	(United States) Ben Keating (Monaco) Jeroen Bleekemolen	22	23	10
Watkins Glen	GTD	33	(United States) Riley Motorsports	SRT Viper GT3-R	(United States) Ben Keating (Monaco) Jeroen Bleekemolen	152	21	6
Lime Rock	GTD	33	(United States) Riley Motorsports	SRT Viper GT3-R	(United States) Ben Keating (Monaco) Jeroen Bleekemolen	162	8	2
Road America	GTD	33	(United States) Riley Motorsports	SRT Viper GT3-R	(United States) Ben Keating (Monaco) Jeroen Bleekemolen	70	22	1
VIR	GTD	33	(United States) Riley Motorsports	SRT Viper GT3-R	(United States) Ben Keating (Monaco) Jeroen Bleekemolen	87	15	7
COTA	GTD	33	(United States) Riley Motorsports	SRT Viper GT3-R	(United States) Ben Keating (Monaco) Jeroen Bleekemolen	69	22	1
Road Atlanta	GTD	33	(United States) Riley Motorsports	SRT Viper GT3-R	(United States) Ben Keating (Monaco) Jeroen Bleekemolen (Netherlands) Sebastiaan Bleekemolen	185	28	12

=== No. 93 Car ===
==== 2015 ====
The No. 93 Viper was originally assigned for a Viper run by Dodge's factory SRT Team. However, Dodge pulled support for the team after the 2014 season, despite the team winning the GTLM class that year. Viper Exchange took over the No. 93 Car going into the 2015 season, entering the car into the North American Endurance Cup, a four-race subset of the larger Tudor United SportsCar Championship. The No. 93 team, including co-drivers Al Carter, Ben Keating, Marc Goossens, Dominik Farnbacher, Cameron Lawrence and Kuno Wittmer, has had great success so far in the 2015 season, including winning the season opening event, the 2015 24 Hours of Daytona. The team then tacked on a top-five finish at the Twelve Hours of Sebring, and then another win at the Six Hours of The Glen, giving the No. 93 team a seven-point lead going into the final race of the NAEC season at Road Atlanta. The No. 93 car also participated in the 2015 Monterey Grand Prix, which is not part of the NAEC season, so that driver Marc Miller could gain experience in a Viper prior to the upcoming 2015 24 Hours of Le Mans. The No. 93 team entered the Petite Grand Prix with a strong lead in the NAEC standings, and only needed a few points to supply them with the season victory. After Cameron Lawrence supplied the team with pole position for the event, Marc Goossens drove the car to a first-place finish in the first segment of the race, which gave the team enough points to guarantee them the NAEC victory. The team would finish the race 3rd in class, giving them a top 5 finish in all the NAEC events. The team finished with 45 points, 10 points ahead of their nearest competition.

2015 Tudor United SportsCar Championship results, No. 93 Car
Event	Class	No	Team	Car	Co-drivers	Laps	Position	Class Pos.
Daytona	GTD	93	(United States) Riley Motorsports	SRT Viper GT3-R	(United States) Ben Keating (Germany) Dominik Farnbacher (United States) Al Carter (Canada) Kuno Wittmer (United States) Cameron Lawrence	704	11	1
Sebring	GTD	93	(United States) Riley Motorsports	SRT Viper GT3-R	(United States) Ben Keating (United States) Al Carter (Belgium) Marc Goossens	317	19	4
Monterey	GTD	93	(United States) Riley Motorsports	SRT Viper GT3-R	(United States) Marc Miller (United States) Jeff Mosing	102	29	8
Watkins Glen	GTD	93	(United States) Riley Motorsports	SRT Viper GT3-R	(United States) Al Carter (United States) Cameron Lawrence (Belgium) Marc Goossens	152	16	1
Road Atlanta	GTD	93	(United States) Riley Motorsports	SRT Viper GT3-R	(United States) Al Carter (United States) Cameron Lawrence (Belgium) Marc Goossens	192	19	3

== 24 Hours of Le Mans ==
=== 2015 24 Hours of Le Mans ===
On April 16, 2015, the Automobile Club de l'Ouest announced that the Viper Exchange.com/Riley Motorsports entry into the 2015 24 Hours of Le Mans had been approved, with American Marc Miller joining Ben Keating and Jeroen Bleekemolen as co-driver. The team drove the No. 53 Dodge Viper GTS-R in the GT-am class. The team was first among the reserves for the event, and the entry gives Keating the opportunity to accomplish the feat of winning both the 24 Hours of Daytona and the 24 Hours of Le Mans events in the same year. This will be the first 24 Hours of Le Mans for both Keating and Miller, while Jeroen will be earning his 10th consecutive start in the event. Jeroen finished fourth in class in qualifying, and so the team had good position for the start of the race. Bleekemolen continued the strong start with his opening shift in the car, leading for most of the third hour, and Keating continued to maintain a top-four position during the second shift. Miller took the third shift through much of the night, and the team entered the final shift, again driven by Bleekemolen, in fifth place. However, Bleekemolen began to notice issues with the gearbox, and after replacing the gearbox failed to resolve the problems, the No. 53 car was forced to retire from the race at 1:45 PM, having completed 304 laps.

2015 24 Hours of Le Mans results
Year	Team	Co-Drivers	Car	Class	Laps	Pos.	Class Pos.
2015	(United States) Riley Motorsports-TI Auto	(Netherlands) Jeroen Bleekemolen (United States) Ben Keating (United States) Marc Miller	SRT Viper GTS-R	GTE; Am	304	DNF	DNF
