= OC Auto Show =

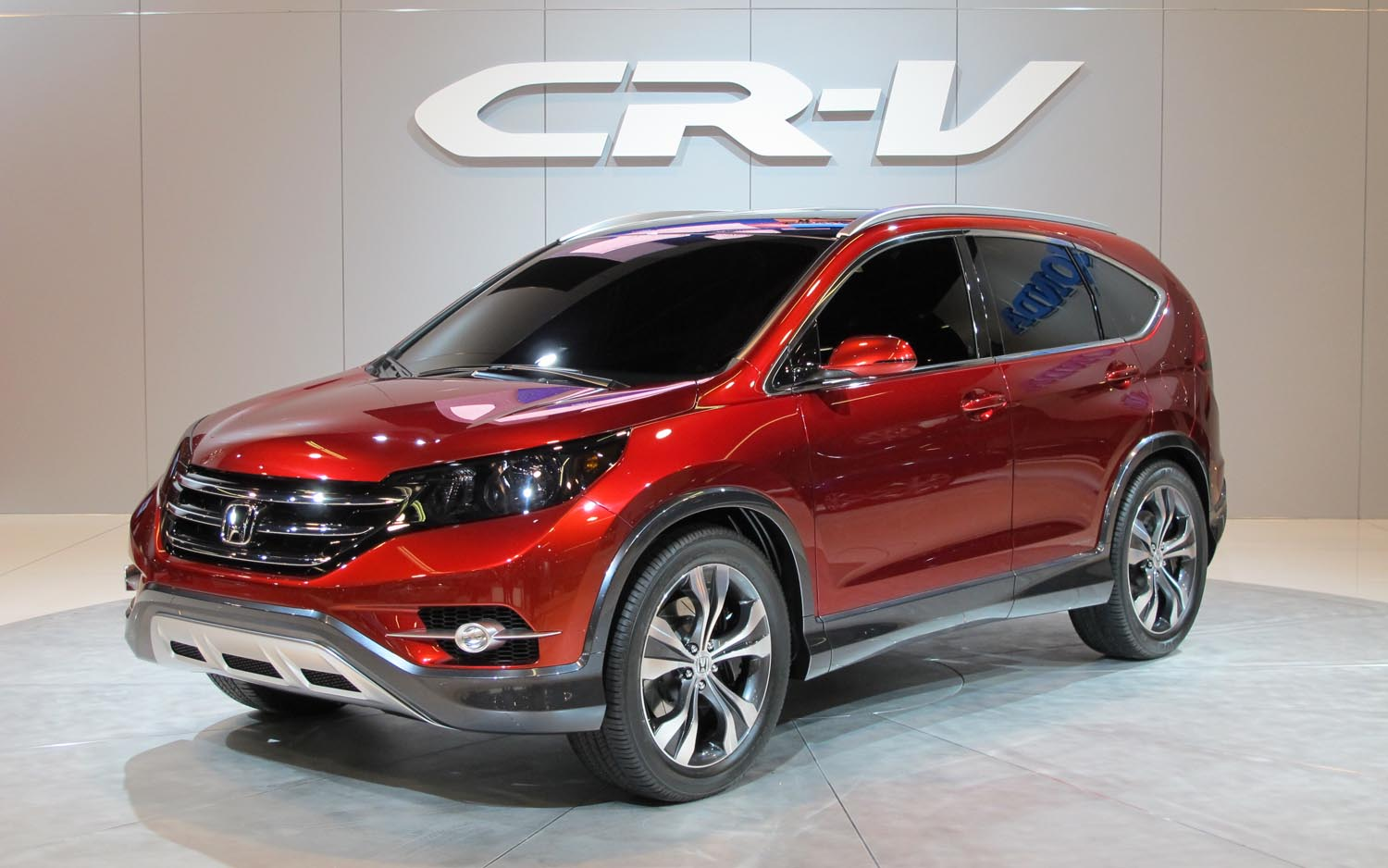
- Honda CR-V Concept at Orange County International Auto Show
- Status: Active
- Venue: Anaheim Convention Center
- Location: Anaheim, California
- Country: United States
- Inaugurated: 1996–2019, 2021–
- Website: autoshowoc.com

The OC Auto Show is an annual event in Anaheim, California, that has been held since 1996. The show runs at the Anaheim Convention Center. In 2006 the former California International Auto Show has announced its name will change to the "Orange County International Auto Show". The show has since been renamed the OC Auto Show. The show is presented by the Orange County Automobile Dealers Association.

This show went on hiatus in 2020.

== 2013 ==
- Mercedes Benz S-Class Sedan
- BMW i3 Coupe
- Nissan Rogue SUV
- Chevrolet Tahoe SUV
- GMC Yukon SUV
- Chevrolet Corvette Stingray

== 2012 ==
- Acura NSX 'The Avengers' Concept
- Honda Accord Sedan
- Honda Accord Coupe

== 2011 ==
- Acura TSX Special Edition
- Honda CR-V Concept

== 2010 ==
- Ford Explorer

== 2009 ==
- Acura ZDX

== 2006 ==
- Nissan Altima Hybrid
- Suzuki "Hip Hop" Grand Vitara Concept

== 2005 ==
- GMC Yukon
- GMC Yukon Denali
- Suzuki Grand Vitara 5-door
- Suzuki "Blizzard" Grand Vitara Concept
- Suzuki "Sea" Forenza Wagon Concept
- Saturn VUE Red Line

== 2004 ==
- Hummer H1 Alpha Convertible
- Hummer H3
- Pontiac Grand Prix
- Saleen S281

== 1998 ==
- Buick Century (facelift)
- Buick Regal (facelift)
- Cadillac Escalade
- Chevrolet Tracker
- Chevrolet Tracker Convertible
- Dodge Grand Caravan ES
- Ford Explorer XSL
- Lincoln LS
- Mercury Mountaineer
- Mercury Villager
- Oldsmobile Silhouette Premiere Edition
- Saturn SL (facelift)
- Saturn SL2 (facelift)
