= Henrik Fisker =

Danish automobile designer

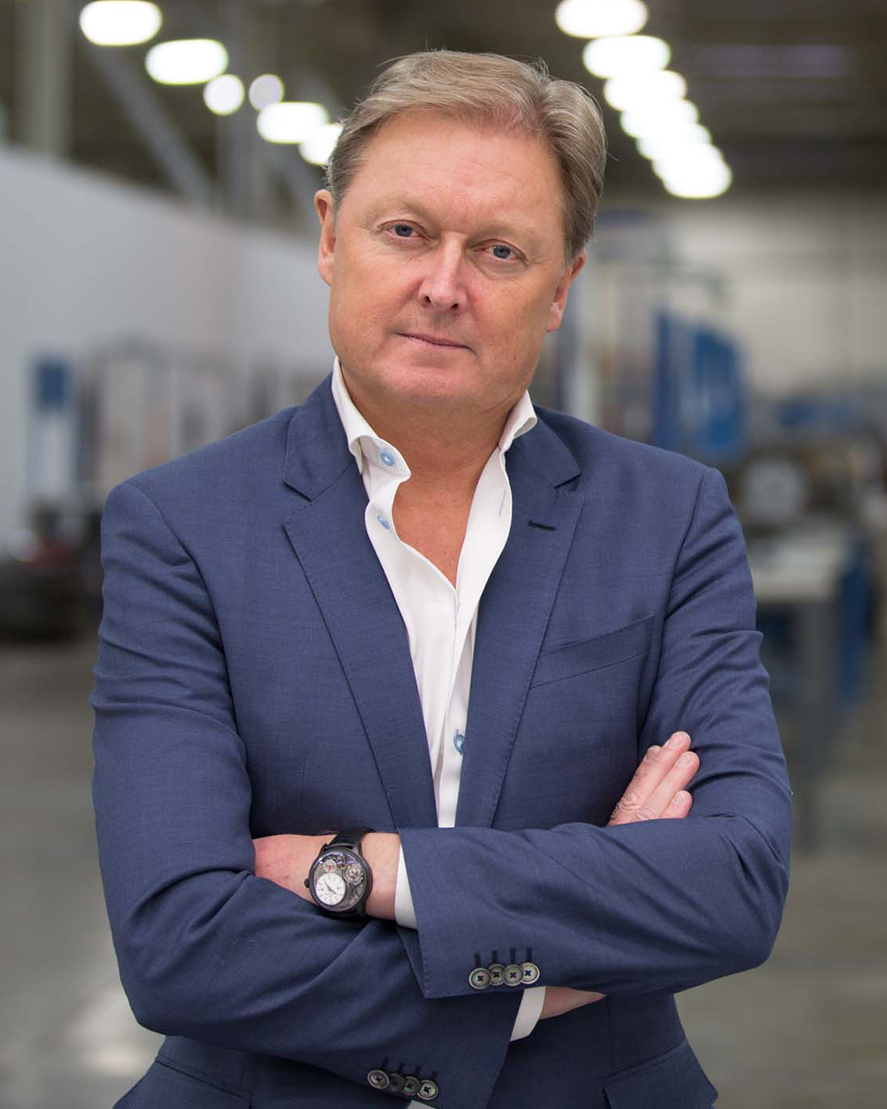
- Fisker in 2016
- Born: 10 August 1963 (age 63); Allerød, Denmark
- Education: ArtCenter College of Design
- Occupations: Car designer and businessman
- Years active: 1989–present
- Known for: Luxury car design
- Spouses: Patricia Fisker (m. 1989–2011); Geeta Gupta (m. 2012)
- Children: 2

Henrik Fisker (born 10 August 1963) is a Danish automotive designer and entrepreneur based in Los Angeles, California, US. He is best known as the founder of Fisker Automotive and Fisker Inc, and as a designer of luxury cars. After working at BMW, Ford, and Aston Martin, Fisker founded Fisker Automotive in 2007. The company failed to meet production deadlines despite significant federal and private investment. Fisker resigned in 2013. The New York Times described the company as the "Solyndra of the electric car industry" and a "debacle". He then became the CEO of Fisker Inc., which he co-founded with his wife in 2016; the company filed for bankruptcy in 2024.

== Early life and education ==
Fisker was born in Allerød, Denmark. As a young boy he became interested in cars after seeing a Maserati Bora on the highway, and soon started sketching designs in notebooks. He graduated with a degree in transportation design from the Art Center College of Design in Vevey, Switzerland, in 1989.

== Career ==
=== Early career ===
==== BMW ====
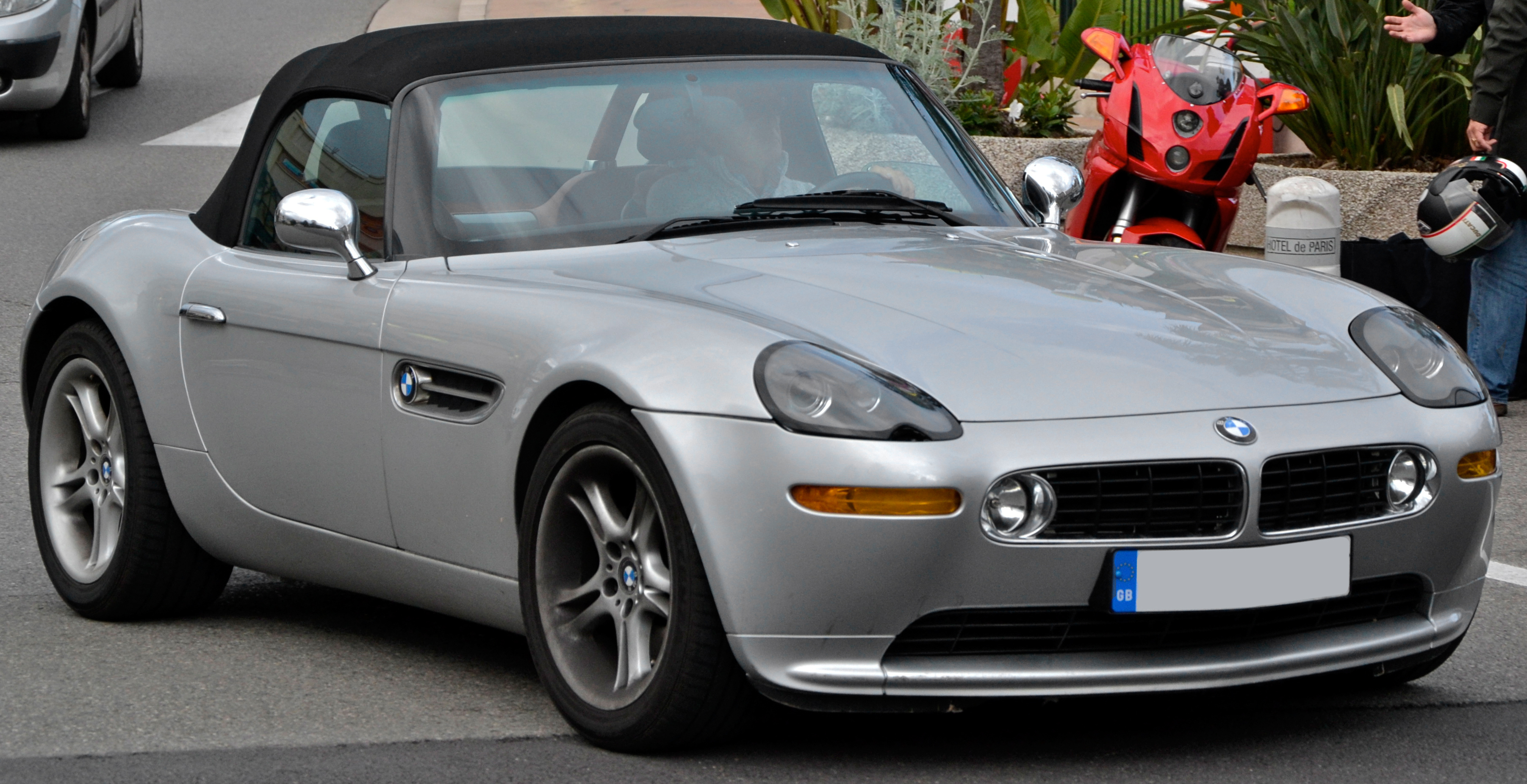
BMW Z8

In 1989, Fisker began working at BMW Technik, the company's advanced design studio in Munich. His first project he collaborated was the E1 electric concept car, designed by Mark Clarke. From 1992 to 1997, he refined the Z07 concept car, which would become the BMW Z8 roadster, produced from 1999 to 2003. The car combined design elements from the company's past with a modern look, paying homage to the BMW 507 (produced from 1956 to 1959). Fisker also worked on the design of BMW's first SUV, a mid-size luxury crossover introduced in 1999, the X5.

From 1999 to 2001, Fisker was the president and chief executive officer of Designworks, a BMW industrial design studio headquartered in Newbury Park, California.

==== Ford, Aston Martin, and others ====
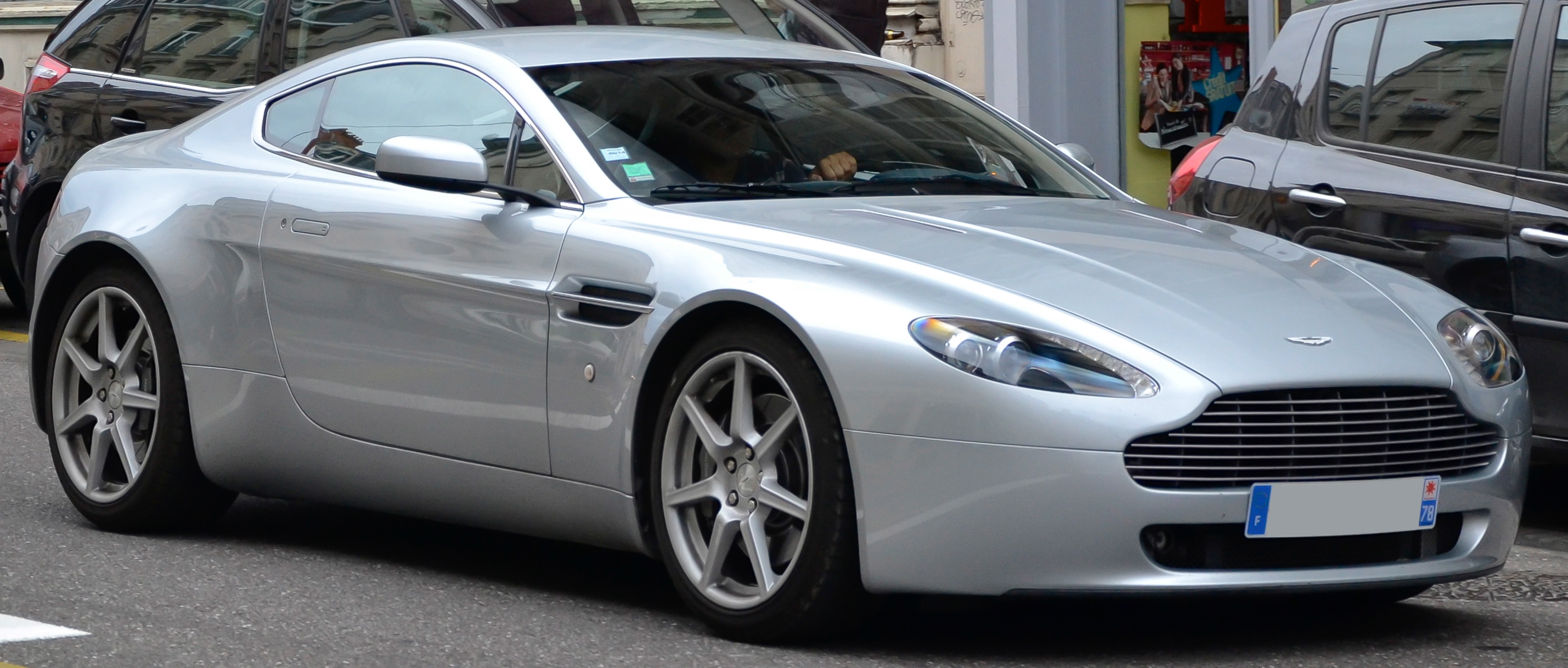
Aston Martin V8 Vantage

Fisker left BMW for the Ford Motor Company in 2001, where he served as design director at Aston Martin. He was in charge of the production design of the Aston Martin DB9 (in production from 2004 to 2016), bringing in elements from the history of Aston Martin cars. The DB9 was available as both a coupe and a convertible. Fisker also designed the Aston Martin V8 Vantage (in production from 2005 to 2018). It was named the coolest car of the year and the best sounding car of the year by Top Gear in 2005. The Vantage is the best selling Aston Martin of all time. The extent of Fisker's involvement in designing both the DB9 and V8 Vantage has been disputed, however, with former director of design at Aston Martin Ian Callum saying the two cars were largely designed under his watch before Fisker joined the company.

From September 2001 to August 2003, Fisker was creative director of Ingeni, Ford's London-based design and creativity center. In August 2003, he became the director of Ford's Global Advanced Design Studio in Irvine, California, where the Ford Shelby GR-1 was designed. In 2005, Fisker left Aston Martin and the Ford Motor Company.

In 2007, Tesla Motors hired Fisker to perform initial design work on the Tesla Model S electric sedan, which was introduced in 2012. That year, he also designed the body of the Artega GT two-door sports car, Artega Automobile's first model, which was produced between 2009 and 2012. It spawned the 2011 Artega SE, an electric sports car with an identical body.

=== Independent companies ===
==== Fisker Coachbuild ====
In 2005, Fisker partnered with Bernhard Koehler to start a custom car firm, Fisker Coachbuild, based in Orange County, California. The company's first car was the Fisker Tramonto, a roadster based on the Mercedes-Benz SL 55 AMG. The company's second car was the Fisker Latigo CS, with a re-bodied BMW 645Ci coupe. 17 units of Tramonto were ever built in collaboration with coachbuilder Stola.

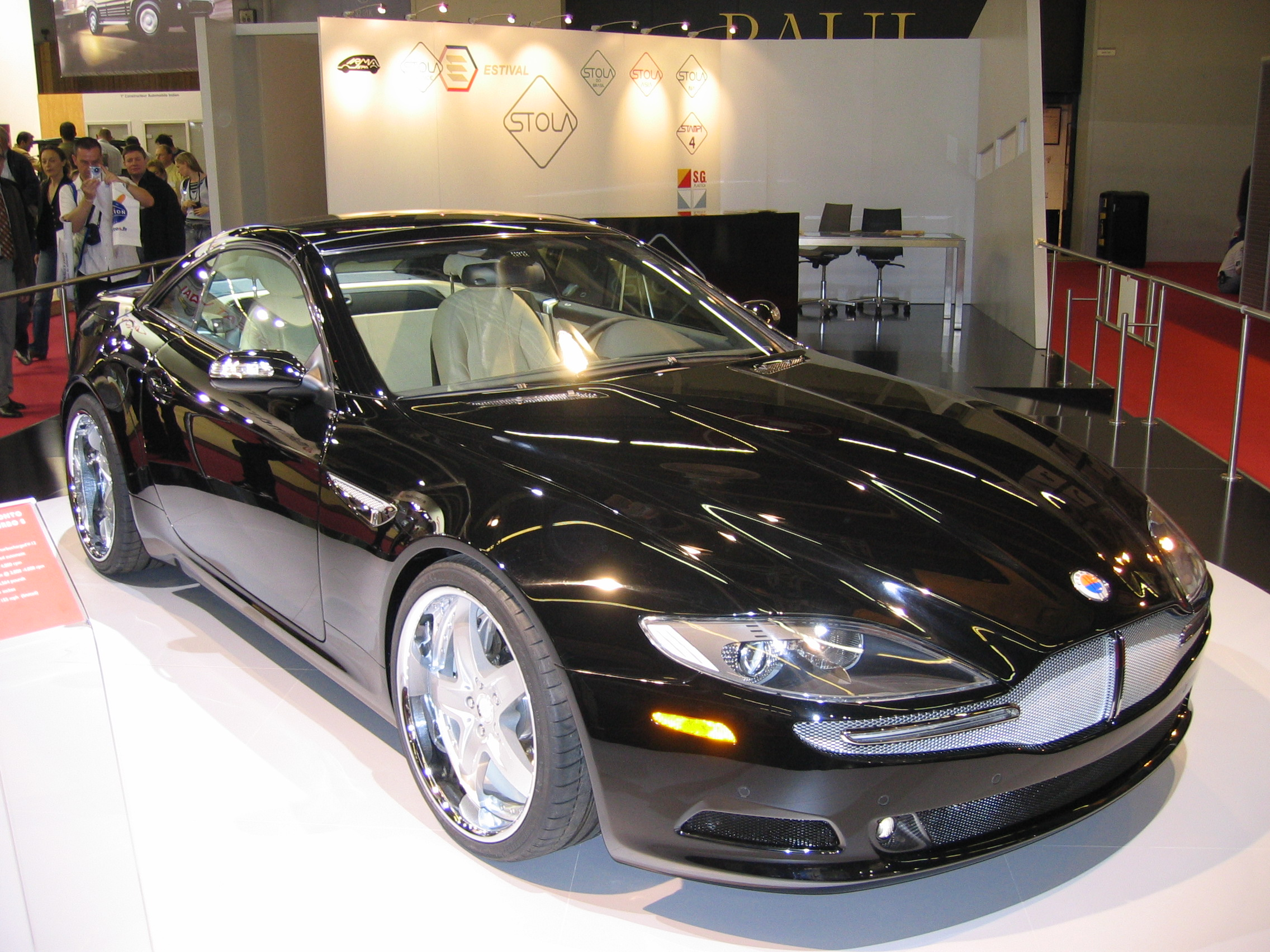
A Fisker Tramonto at the 2006 Paris Motor Show

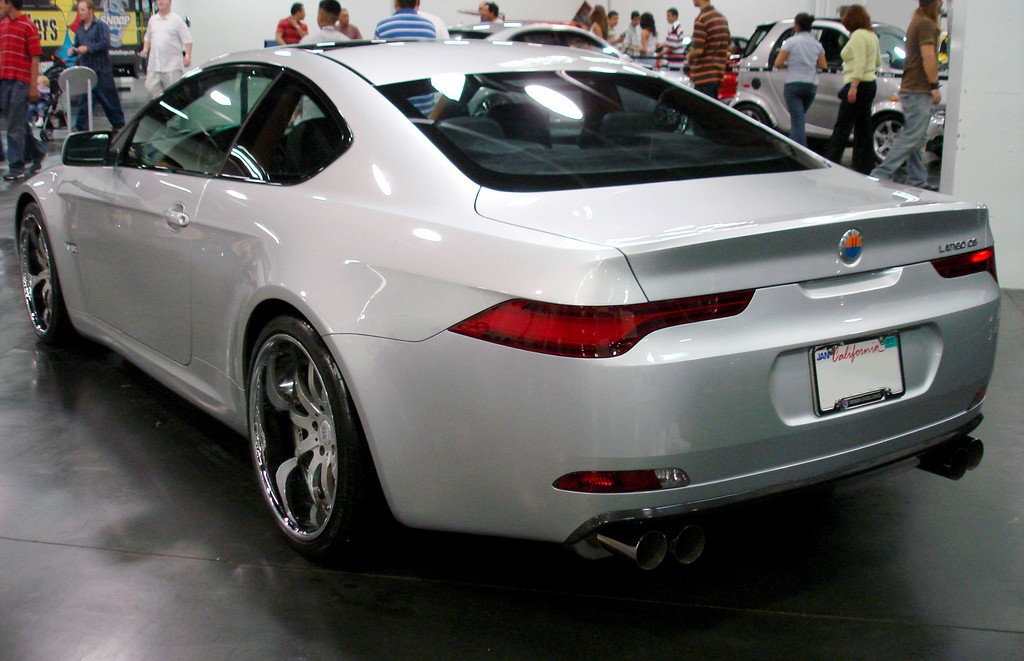
A Fisker Latigo C6 at the 2006 Orange County Auto Show

==== Fisker Automotive ====
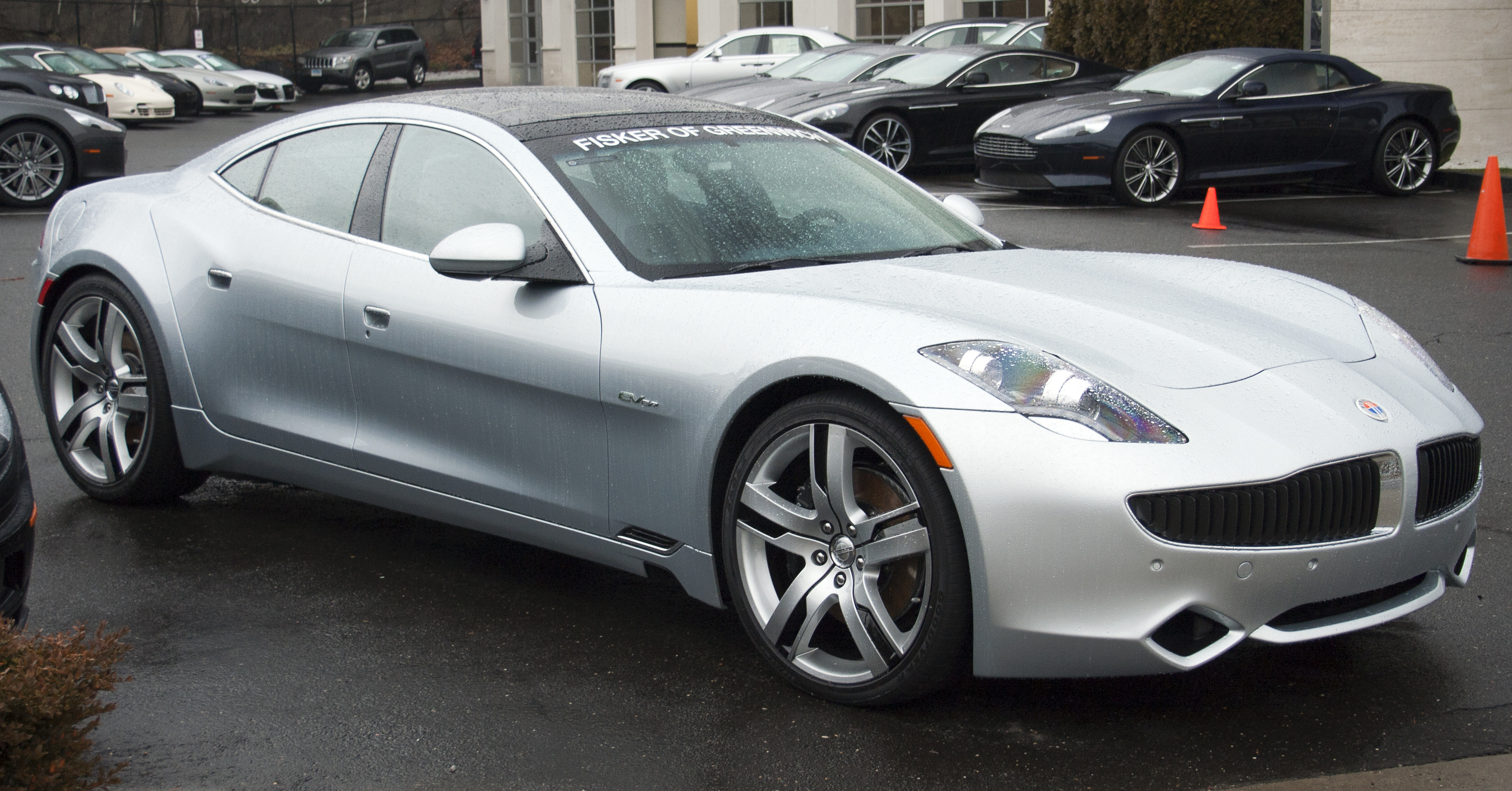
A 2012 Fisker Karma

In August 2007, Fisker and Quantum Technologies launched Fisker Automotive in Anaheim, California.

The first car to be designed by Fisker Automotive was the Fisker Karma, a hybrid sports sedan. The Karma was the only car by Fisker to ever be produced. In 2009, Fisker displayed the company's second model, the Karma Sunset, a two-door retractable-hardtop convertible based on the regular Karma. The Fisker Surf, displayed in 2011, was designed as a four-door plug-in hybrid hatchback. Neither the Sunset or the Surf entered production.

In 2008, Fisker raised over $90 million from investors including venture capital firm Kleiner Perkins Caufield & Byers and actor Leonardo DiCaprio. In total, the company raised over $1 billion from private investors. In September 2009, Fisker Automotive was awarded a $528 million loan guarantee by the United States Department of Energy (DOE). The automaker was one of four recipients of the Advanced Technology Vehicles Manufacturing Loan Program, to encourage the domestic manufacture of electric cars. The funds were to be used to develop the Karma, as well as an affordable family-size plug-in hybrid car. The loan facility was frozen at $192 million in February 2012, after the DOE claimed that Fisker missed its milestones. According to the DOE, the government recouped a total of approximately $53 million ($28 million from the company plus $25 million from the sale of the loan to Hybrid Technology, months before assets of Fisker Automotive were sold to Wanxiang for $149.2 million). The New York Times described the company as the "Solyndra of the electric car industry" and a "debacle".

Fisker resigned as chairman from Fisker Automotive in March 2013, after the company failed to meet a series of production deadlines. Later that year, the company declared voluntary bankruptcy. Assets of Fisker Automotive were sold at a bankruptcy auction in 2014 to Chinese automotive parts firm Wanxiang for $149.2 million. In September 2015, Fisker Automotive was renamed Karma Automotive. The Fisker Karma was renamed the Karma Revero in 2016. Fisker is not affiliated with Karma Automotive or its parent company Wanxiang.

==== HF Design ====
In 2013, Fisker formed HF Design & Technology, a Los Angeles-based design house.

In November 2014, Fisker designed the Galpin-Fisker Mustang Rocket, a coachbuilt custom-bodied Mustang. The car was a collaboration between HF Design and Galpin Auto Sports. In 2017, it was renamed the VLF Rocket V8.

==== VLF Automotive ====
In January 2016, Fisker formed VLF Automotive with manufacturer and former Boeing executive Gilbert Villarreal, and auto engineer and former General Motors executive Bob Lutz, to manufacture small-run handcrafted luxury cars. Based in Auburn Hills, Michigan, VLF is the successor to VL Automotive, which was launched in 2013 and led by Villarreal and Lutz. VLF designed the Force 1 V10 car in 2016. Production began at VLF's Auburn Hills manufacturing facility in August 2016, with approximately 50 of the two-seaters scheduled to be manufactured. Only five cars were actually produced.

==== Fisker Inc. ====
In 2016, Fisker launched Fisker Inc. The company's only vehicle is the Fisker Ocean, which began production in 2022. The first deliveries of the launch edition, the Ocean One, occurred in May 2023. As of 2022, the Ocean had 63,000 preorders. Only 10,000 were built, with fewer than half delivered.

On 8 July 2020, Fisker announced the completion of a US$50 million Series C financing round funded by Moore Strategic Ventures, the private investment arm of Louis Bacon. On 13 July 2020, Fisker announced that Fisker Inc. would offer an initial public offering on the New York Stock Exchange through a merger with special-purpose acquisition company Spartan Energy Acquisition Corp., which is backed by private equity firm Apollo Global Management. On 30 October 2020, Fisker Inc. officially closed its merger with Spartan Energy Acquisition Corp. The company is publicly listed and traded on the New York Stock Exchange under the ticker (NYSE:FSR). On 28 June 2021, Fisker stock was added to the Russell 3000 Index.

On 17 June 2024, Fisker Inc. filed for Chapter 11 bankruptcy protection in Delaware, listing liabilities at between $100 million to $500 million and assets between $500 million and $1 billion. The company stated that possible deal talks with a big automaker collapsed, which led it to its bankruptcy. Fisker claims that it is planning to repay its creditors during the bankruptcy proceedings.

== Controversies ==
=== Tesla Motors v. Fisker Coachbuild (2008) ===
On 14 April 2008, Tesla Motors filed a lawsuit against Fisker Coachbuild, Fisker and Koehler, contending that they had fraudulently agreed to a design contract in 2007 only to gain access to confidential information, before announcing a competing vehicle, the Fisker Karma. Both the Tesla and Fisker vehicles in question were designed as serial hybrid cars, with a gas engine powering a generator that charges a battery to power the electric motor, and both were initially planned for delivery in 2010. The lawsuit sought to prevent Fisker from using Tesla design documents, along with a return of the money from the Tesla contract, plus punitive damages. Fisker filed for arbitration in May 2008. An arbitrator ruled in their favour in November 2008, finding "overwhelming" evidence showing that Fisker did not do anything wrong. Subsequently, Tesla was ordered to pay US$1.14 million in legal fees and costs to Fisker.

=== Fisker Automotive congressional hearing (2013) ===
Following his resignation from Fisker Automotive in March 2013, Fisker voluntarily testified on 24 April 2013, at a congressional hearing led by the House Oversight and Government Reform Committee on the Department of Energy's $192 million disbursement to Fisker Automotive through the Advanced Technology Vehicles Manufacturing Loan Program. Fisker Automotive had failed earlier that week to meet the deadline for repayment on the loan, which was originally approved as a $529 million loan guarantee.

=== Fisker v. Aston Martin (2015–16) ===
On 4 January 2016, Fisker filed a suit against Aston Martin and three of its executives for US$100 million in damages for civil extortion, claiming that his former employer was trying to prevent him from unveiling his new luxury sports car hybrid, the VLF Force 1 V10, at the 2016 North American International Auto Show. The complaint claimed that after Fisker released a single pen-on-paper sketch of the Force 1 in December 2015, he received a letter from Aston Martin claiming the design was too similar to their DB10 and demanding that he either change the design or not display the car at the auto show. Aston Martin had previously sued Fisker in 2015 over his car design for the Thunderbolt. That case was settled after Fisker agreed not to move forward with the vehicle. Following the January 2016 auto show debut of the Force 1, it was clear that the vehicle was not similar to the DB10. Aston Martin subsequently stopped threatening to interfere with the development of the Force 1, and the matter was resolved in April 2016.

== Personal life ==
Fisker is married to Geeta Gupta-Fisker, who was the co-founder and CFO of Fisker Inc.

== See also ==
- Fisker Automotive
- VLF Automotive
- Fisker Inc.
