= VLF Destino =

Overview
- Manufacturer: VLF Automotive
- Also called: VL Destino; WM Destino
- Production: 2016
- Assembly: Auburn Hills, Michigan
- Designer: Henrik Fisker

Body and chassis
- Class: Full-size luxury car
- Body style: 4-door sedan
- Layout: Front mid-engine, rear wheel drive
- Platform: GM E-Flex Platform
- Related: Fisker Karma; Karma Revero; Chevrolet Volt Concept

Powertrain
- Engine: 6.2 L supercharged GM LS9 V8
- Transmission: 6-speed automatic

Dimensions
- Wheelbase: 3,159.8 mm (124.4 in)
- Length: 4,988.6 mm (196.4 in)
- Width: 2,133.6 mm (84 in)
- Height: 1,331.0 mm (52.4 in)
- Curb weight: 1,905 kg (4,200 lb)

The VLF Destino was a proposed automobile from American car company VLF Automotive. The Destino was a large four-door sedan and was first shown to the public at the North American International Auto Show in January 2013 as the VL Destino, and subsequently the WM Destino, before being named VLF Destino in January 2016. Sales were expected to commence in 2014, but the expected start of sales was later pushed back to 2016.

== History ==
The Destino was based on the Fisker Karma, which ceased production in 2012. VL had obtained 20 Karma "gliders" from Fisker Automotive, and reported 100 orders by May 2013. Sales of the Destino were originally scheduled to commence in the second half of 2013, but the start was pushed back to 2014, due to the ongoing restructuring of Fisker.

The Destino retained the Karma interior and most exterior panels, but removed the Karma's electric motor and battery system, and installed a General Motors LS9 6.2-litre V-8 gasoline engine producing 638 hp (476 kW; 647 PS) and 604 lbf·ft (819 N·m) of torque fitted with a 6-speed automatic transmission.

It was planned in 2013 that the cars would be built in Auburn Hills in Michigan.

The manufacturer proposed a sale price of US$200,000 in 2014.

In May 2014 VL merged with WM GreenTech Automotive, which resulted in the car being renamed WM Destino by its new owners.

In January 2016, the car was renamed as the VLF Destino V8, to mark the creation of the new company VLF Automotive.

== Technical ==
Unlike the discontinued hybrid Fisker Karma, the Destino was powered by a traditional gasoline engine from GM manufactured to power Chevrolets and Cadillacs. The 6.2-litre (6162 cc) V8 supercharged LS9 engine was front mid-mounted and powered the rear wheels. Producing 638 hp at 6,500 rpm and torque of 604 lb-ft (819 Nm) at 3,800 rpm, the Destino was claimed to accelerate 0-60 mph in 3.9 seconds and reach a maximum speed of 200 mph.
