= TI Fluid Systems =

British multinational company

TI Fluid Systems plc
- Type: Private
- Traded as: LSE: TIFS
- Industry: Automotive Engineering
- Founded: 2000
- Headquarters: Auburn Hills, Michigan
- Key people: Manfred Wennemer (Chairman); Hans Dieltjens, (CEO and President)
- Products: Automotive fluid systems
- Revenue: ▼€3,360.3 million (2024)
- Operating income: ▼€173.0 million (2024)
- Net income: ▼€32.5 million (2024)
- Number of employees: 25,600 (2023)
- Parent: Apollo Global Management
- Website: www.tifluidsystems.com

TI Fluid Systems plc is a British-American multinational company which develops, manufactures and supplies automotive fluid storage, carrying and delivery systems. The company serves the automotive aftermarket through Bundy, Walbro and Marwal brands.

Headquartered in Auburn Hills, Michigan, United States, it was listed on the London Stock Exchange until it was acquired by Toronto-based ABC Technologies, a company controlled by Apollo Global Management, in April 2025.

== History ==
The company traces its history back to the Bundy Corporation, which was founded in 1922 and supplied petroleum fuel lines to the Ford Model T. It was acquired by TI Group plc in 1988. After Smiths Group acquired TI Group in 2000, Smiths Group transferred its newly acquired automotive business into a corporate entity in 2001 thereby creating TI Automotive.

In 2007, the company was acquired by a consortium of private equity investors. The company was forced to go through a debt-to-equity swap in 2009 following the global economic downturn.

William "Bill" L. Kozyra was named chairman, chief executive officer and president of TI Automotive in May 2008.

In January 2015, the company was acquired by Bain Capital for $2.4 billion.

In October 2017, the company floated on the London Stock Exchange under its new name of TI Fluid Systems. The company floated 25 percent of its shares.

In September 2023, it was announced TI Fluid Systems has acquired the Halásztelek-headquartered plastic injection moulding company, Cascade Engineering Europe Kft. for $27.7 million.

In December 2024, the directors agreed a takeover offer from ABC Technologies of Canada, a company controlled by Apollo Global Management. The £1.83bn deal includes plans to cut up to 2,700 jobs worldwide, around 10% of TI Fluid Systems’ workforce, with staff at its Oxford headquarters being reduced by a third. The court approved the transaction on 8 April 2025, so allowing it to be completed.

== Structure ==
The company has two divisions: fuel tank systems and fluid carrying systems (such as brakes, battery cooling and climate control).
