= Al Carter =

American sportswriter (born 1952)

Albert Houston Carter Jr. (born May 20, 1952) is a former reporter and sports columnist for the Houston Chronicle, The Dallas Morning News and other major daily newspapers in Texas and Oklahoma. His writing career spanned three decades. He was the recipient of numerous national and regional writing awards, including Oklahoma Sportswriter of the Year (1980) and Texas Sportswriter of the Year (1985). He has made frequent appearances on TV and radio sports shows and has had numerous articles published in sports magazines and books.

He carried the lead byline for two of the greatest disappointments in Houston sports history: the upset loss by the University of Houston basketball team to North Carolina State in the championship game of the 1983 Final Four, which he covered for the Chronicle; and the 1993 American Football Conference playoff loss by the Houston Oilers to the Buffalo Bills, which he covered for the Houston Post. Down by 32 points in the second half, Buffalo completed the greatest comeback in NFL history and won in overtime.

From 2003 to 2008, Carter served as deputy sports editor for the San Antonio Express-News. In 2008, with most major newspapers, including the Express-News, undergoing dramatic downsizing and coverage reductions, he retired from journalism and returned to his hometown of Houston. He later taught American History at his alma mater, South Houston High School.

== Early life ==
In 1970, Carter graduated from South Houston High School, where he had worked on the school paper. He attended San Jacinto College in Pasadena, Texas, for two years, graduating with an associate of arts degree in 1972. He was later named a distinguished alumnus of the school. His award-winning work for the San Jacinto College paper earned him a spot on the staff of The Daily Texan at the University of Texas. His Daily Texan colleagues included several young writers destined for long careers in sports journalism, among them Kirk Bohls, Richard Justice, Danny Robbins, Buck Harvey and Alan Truex. Carter graduated with a bachelor's degree in journalism from UT in 1974.

== Career ==
Carter began his daily newspaper career with the Savannah Morning News in 1974, but left after a few months to return to Texas. He wrote for the Corpus Christi Caller-Times from 1975 to 1979, covering mostly high-school athletics. In 1976, he won the Texas Headliners Award for an account of a record-shattering minor-league baseball game. In 1979, he moved to The Daily Oklahoman as a college reporter and columnist. He covered Jimmy Johnson's first few months as football coach at Oklahoma State University, but was moved to the University of Oklahoma beat shortly before the start of the 1979 season.

After three years, Carter returned to his hometown and joined the sports staff of the Houston Chronicle, originally as the beat writer for Southwest Conference athletics. In 1983, Carter was the first to report Clyde Drexler's decision to leave the University of Houston and enter the National Basketball Association draft as a junior.

Carter's work at the Chronicle also began a long connection with Texas A&M athletics. As a college writer for three newspapers, Carter covered A&M sports for most of the 21-year span in which Jackie Sherrill and then R.C. Slocum served as the school's head football coach. Carter was honored by the Associated Press Sports Editors in 1986 for his in-depth coverage of the circumstances that led to the resignation of University of Texas football coach Fred Akers. In 1988, with A&M facing the threat of additional NCAA sanctions because of football rules violations under Sherrill, Carter was among the most vocal critics of the Aggies' coach. In his Chronicle column, Carter called for Sherrill's resignation. A few weeks later, A&M officials forced Sherrill to quit.

In 1990, Carter accepted an offer to jump to the Chronicle's rival, the Houston Post. At the Post, Carter covered college athletics for one year before taking over as beat reporter on the Houston Oilers for two years. In 1993, with the Post fighting a losing battle to compete with the Chronicle, Carter left the newspaper for a high-school teaching position. In 1995, the Chronicle bought the Post's assets and folded the paper.

In 1994, with the Big 12 Conference about to begin operations, Carter accepted an offer to cover Texas A&M for The Dallas Morning News. In 2002, he was the first to report the firing of Slocum, who in his 14 seasons had won more games than any football coach in A&M history. Eager to move into an editor's role, he joined the Express-News in 2003 as deputy sports editor.
