= Karma Automotive =

Southern California based producer of luxury electric vehicles

Karma Automotive LLC
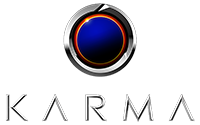
- Company type: Private
- Industry: Automotive
- Predecessor: Fisker Automotive
- Founded: 2014
- Headquarters: Irvine, California
- Key people: Marques McCammon (President)
- Products: Karma Revero; Karma Revero GT; Karma GS-6; Karma Gyesera; Karma Kaveya; Karma Amaris; Karma Ivara; Karma Invictus
- Number of employees: 625 (2016)
- Website: karmaautomotive.com karmanewsroom.com

Karma Automotive is a privately owned American luxury electric vehicle company founded in 2014. Headquartered in Irvine, California with an assembly plant located in Moreno Valley, Karma sells vehicles via its dealer network of locations in North America, Europe, South America, and the Middle East.

== History ==
In February 2014, Chinese auto-parts supplier Wanxiang Group purchased assets of Fisker Automotive for $149.2 million in a bankruptcy auction. These assets included designs, a plug-in hybrid powertrain, and the former Wilmington Assembly factory in Wilmington, Delaware. Fisker Automotive was founded in 2007 by Henrik Fisker and his business partner Bernhard Koehler. Its Fisker Karma plug-in hybrid sports sedan debuted in 2011, and about 2,000 of the vehicles were sold. After Fisker's battery supplier A123 Systems filed for bankruptcy after two battery recalls, Fisker Automotive could not continue its business operations, and the company declared bankruptcy in February 2014, which led to the Wanxiang acquisition. The purchase excluded the Fisker brand and trademarks owned by Henrik Fisker. Wanxiang also purchased A123 Systems following its bankruptcy declaration.

From these acquisitions Wanxiang Group formed its new company Karma Automotive.

In early 2016, Karma Automotive enlisted a straw buyer in an attempt to reverse engineer technology from a parts supplier and former employee.

In October 2016, the Wilmington, Delaware factory was put up for sale by Wanxiang Group. The site was purchased by Harvey, Hanna & Associates in 2017 and was completely demolished by end of 2019. On May 19, 2020, Amazon announced it would build a fulfillment center on the site of the former Wilmington Assembly plant. The 3,700,000 sq ft (340,000 m^{2}) fulfillment center, which is Amazon's third in the state, opened in 2021.

The company began building the Revero in 2016 at its factory in Moreno Valley, California, with production set to begin in late 2016. The Revero debuted on September 8, 2016. Karma planned to manufacture 3,000 of the vehicles. Karma hopes to build close to 150 cars in 2018, and in the 200 to 300 range of cars in 2019 and beyond. On April 11, 2019, Karma Automotive issued a recall and stop-sale order on all Revero vehicles, due to a flaw in the roll over sensors which would disable the side-curtain airbags.

In 2019, the company opened the Karma's Innovation and Customization Center. In conjunction with the opening, Karma announced a design and manufacturing partnership with electric vehicle company AYRO to build 20,000 electric delivery vehicles by 2023. Karma's Innovation and Customization Center has the ability to build the frames, chassis and bodies, integrate the powertrain and finish the cars in its robotic paint shop.

In November 2019, Karma Automotive laid off 200 employees at its Irvine, California headquarters due to financial difficulty. In February 2020, the company laid off an additional 60 employees.

In July 2020, the company raised US$100 million from outside investors. Karma announced its intentions to license its electric vehicle platform to other automakers in order to generate more revenue.

In November 2020, Karma sued Lordstown Motors in a technology dispute.

== Leadership ==
- Tom Corcoran (2014–2017)
- Liang Zhou (2017–2023)
- Marques McCammon (2023–present)

== Models ==
=== Production models ===
==== Revero ====
The Revero is a luxury plug-in hybrid electric vehicle (PHEV). The sedan model was awarded Luxury Green Car of the Year by Green Car Journal in 2018. The model's total cruising range is approximately 300 miles with combined electric and combustion engine power, while electric power alone provides an estimated 50 miles (80 km).

==== Revero GT ====
The Revero GT is a luxury plug-in hybrid electric vehicle (PHEV). The model was awarded the 2020 Luxury Green Car of the Year Award from Green Car Journal in 2020. The GT model is differentiated from the standard Revero model by a launch control feature and increased acceleration (0 to 60 mph in approximately 4.5 seconds). The model's total cruising range is approximately 360 miles (580 km) with combined electric and combustion engine power, and approximately 80 miles (130 km) with only electric power. Karma plans to remake the Revero GT as its halo vehicle, upgrading the model with an all-wheel-drive powertrain said to offer in excess of 1,100 hp.

==== GS Series ====
The GS Series is a new vehicle line introduced in 2021. The series includes the company's first battery-electric sedan. In addition, the company announced plans to reduce the prices of the GS line.

===== GS-6 =====
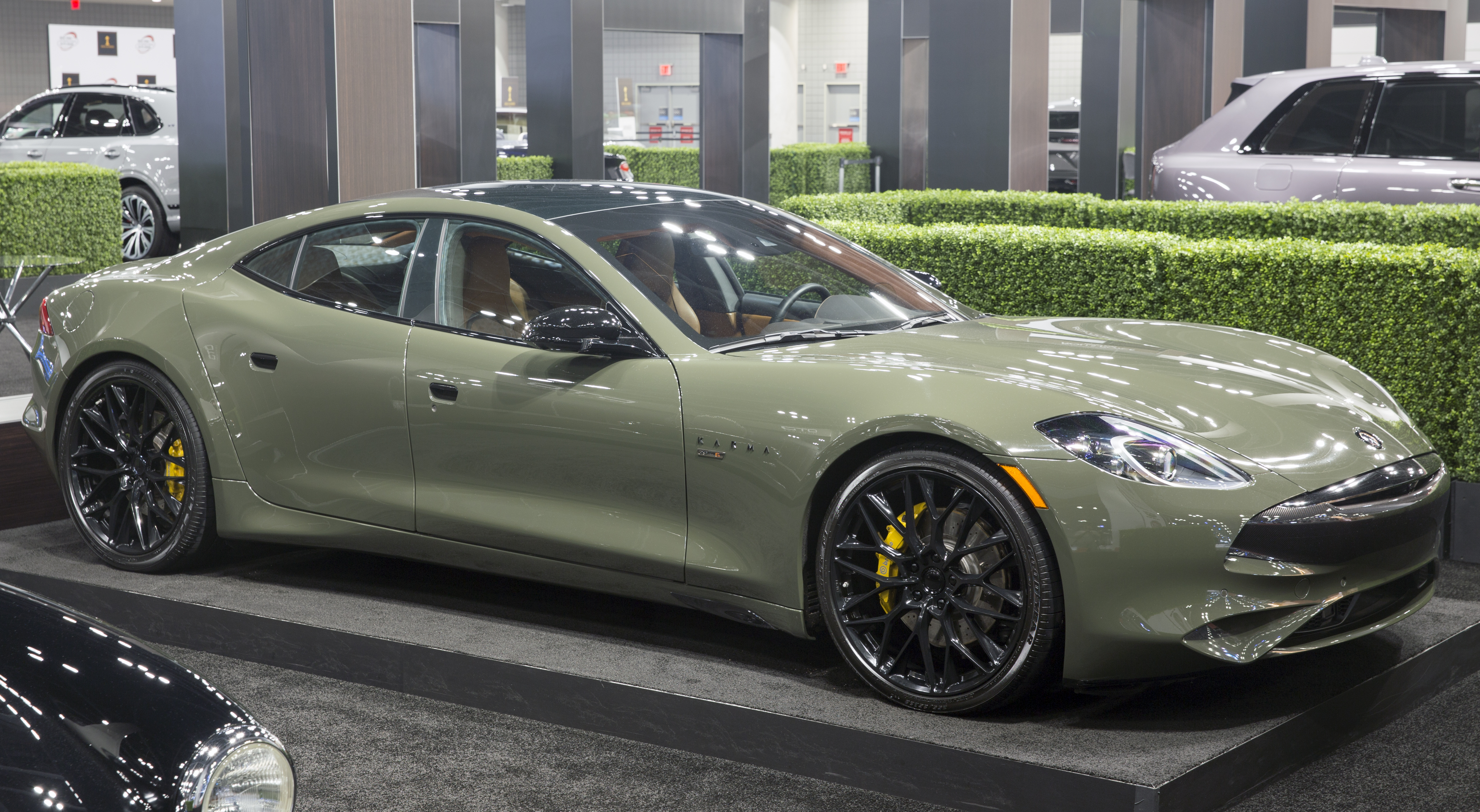
Karma GS-6

The GS-6 is a range-extended, plug-in hybrid vehicle capable of traveling up to 330 miles (530 km) with combined electric and combustion engine power. The GS-6 has a 400-kw, two-motor propulsion system that outputs 536 hp and 550 lb-ft of torque.

===== GSe-6 =====
The GSe-6 is an all-electric vehicle, holding an 85-kWh battery pack that provides up to 230 miles (370 km) of range. A version with a 105-kWh pack & more than 300 miles (480 km) of range is in development. The GS-6 has a 400-kw, two-motor propulsion system that outputs 536 hp and 550 lb-ft of torque.This vehicle's development was canceled in 2023.

Amaris

The Karma Amaris is a high-performance 2-door luxury coupé range-extended, plug-in hybrid vehicle capable of traveling up to 400 miles. Production is expected to begin in late 2026 for the 2027 model year. The Amaris uses a 41.5 kWh battery paired with a turbocharged 4-cylinder range-extender engine, providing over 100 miles of electric-only range, while the combined range exceeds 400 miles. Packing 708 hp and 676 lb-ft of torque, the Amaris will launch 0-60 mph in 3.5 seconds with an electronically capped top speed 165 mph. It features a "Comet Line" design language with a low-slung, aggressive stance, swan doors, and a carbon fiber/aluminum body. The interior is a 2-seater configuration focused on luxury, utilizing sustainable materials, digital displays, and a full glass roof.

=== Concept cars ===
==== Karma GT by Pininfarina ====
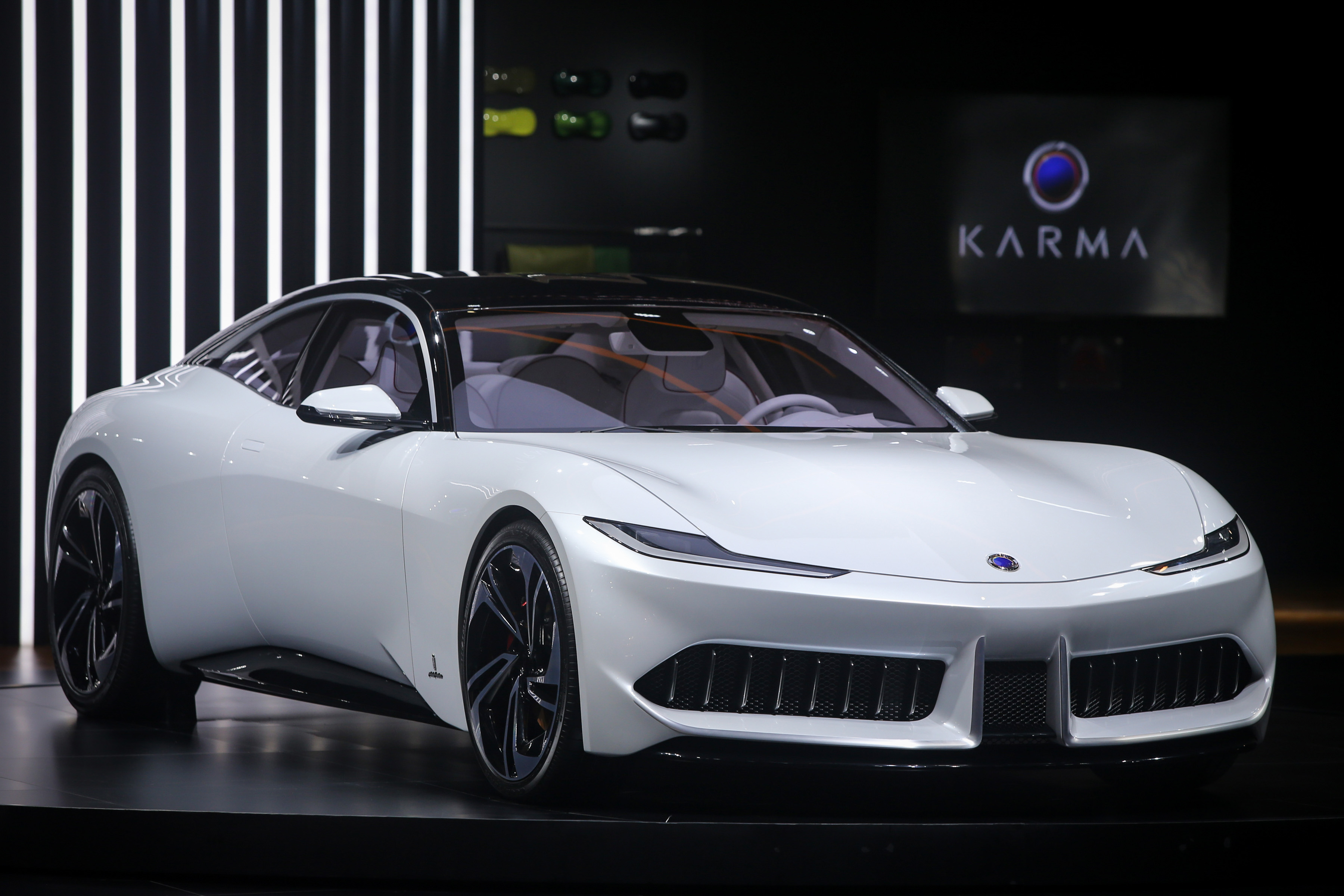
Karma GT by Pininfarina

The Karma GT by Pininfarina is a range-extender luxury electric hybrid coupe, based on the 2020 Revero chassis with a body by Pininfarina. It was introduced at the 2019 Shanghai Auto Show.

==== SC1 Vision Concept ====
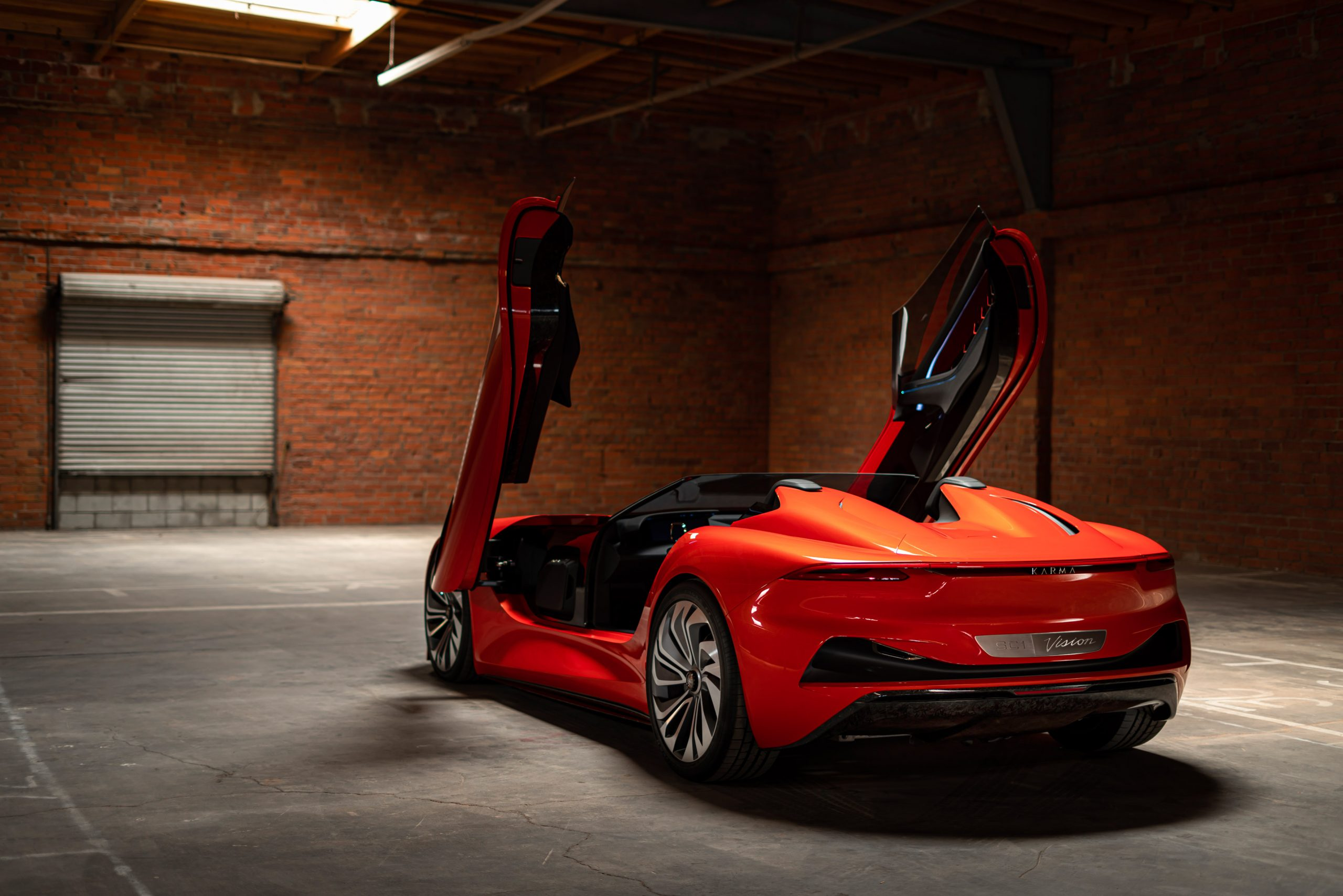
Karma Automotive SC1

The Karma SC1 Vision Concept is a roofless scissor-doored working fully electric sports car concept. It was introduced at the 2019 Shanghai Auto Show.

==== SC2 Concept ====
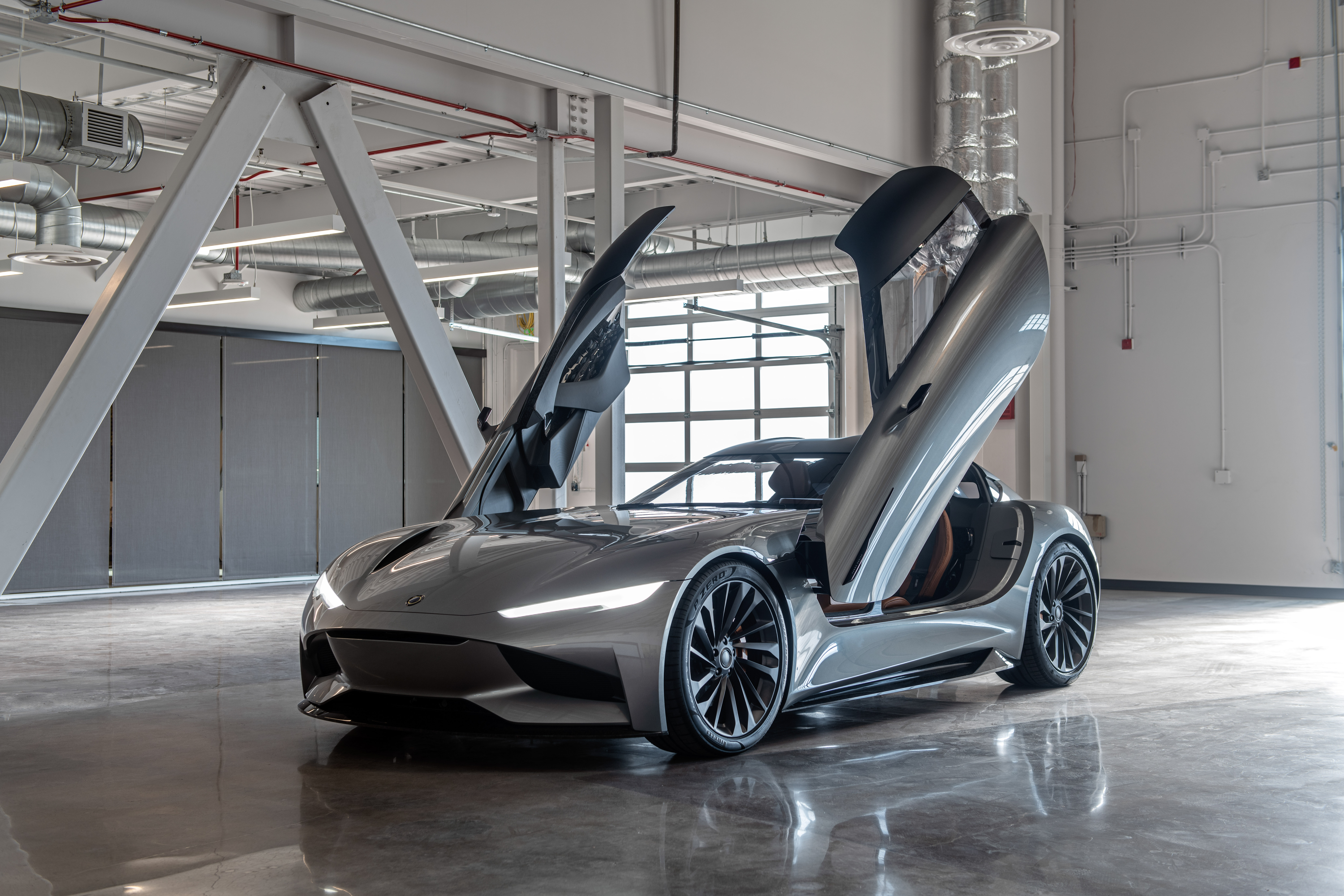
Karma Automotive SC2

The Karma SC2 Concept is a scissor-doored working fully electric sports car concept. It was unveiled on the eve of the 2019 Los Angeles Auto Show. It was named 2020's Concept Car of the Year by Robb Report in their "Best of Best" issue.

== See also ==
- Fisker Coachbuild (2005–2007)
- Fisker Automotive (2007–2014)
- Fisker Inc. (2016–2024)
- VLF Automotive
