= Copy Exactly! =

Factory strategy model

Copy Exactly! is a factory strategy model developed by the computer chip manufacturer, Intel, to build new manufacturing facilities with high capacity practices already in place. The Copy Exactly! model allows factories that successfully design and manufacture chips to be replicated in locations globally. Intel styled the phrase as Copy EXACTLY!, with the capital letters, underline, and exclamation point emphasizing the paradigm shift.

== Information ==
The Copy Exactly! methodology focuses on matching the manufacturing site to the development site. Matching occurs at all levels for physical inputs and statistically-matched responses (outputs). This process enables continuous matching over time by using coordinated changes, audits, process control systems, and joint fab management structures. Physical inputs such as equipment configuration, chemical purity, facilities, and equipment hookups derive from the same specifications. In-line processes or equipment monitors that predict product performance, yield, or reliability must match at all levels. Originally, the Copy Exactly! procedure was for tool sets and process, but Intel has since encompassed the entire fabrication plant into the strategy model in recent years.

== Similar uses ==
A123 Systems, a US company that makes lithium-ion batteries, has recently repatriated its manufacturing operations after years of producing in South Korea and China. To facilitate the move, the company also used a "copy exactly" strategy. South Korean operations were replicated on a larger scale in the United States with the help of a team of South Korean engineers who were familiar with the production process.

== See also ==
- Tacit knowledge
