= Eva Håkansson =

Swedish mechanical engineer

- Born: 1981
- Education: Mälardalen University; University of Denver (Ph.D.)
- Occupation: Lecturer
- Known for: Electric motorcycling
- Spouse: Bill Dube
- Website: evahakanssonracing.com

Eva Håkansson is a Swedish mechanical engineer and lecturer at the University of Auckland. In 2014 she became the world's fastest woman on an electric motorbike.

== Early life and education ==
Håkansson grew up in Sweden. She studied Business Administration and Environmental Science at Mälardalen University College. Her father, Sven Håkansson, used to build motorcycles and her mother was the family mechanic. In 2007 she converted a motorcycle into an electronic bike with her father and the ElectroCat became the first registered e-bike in Sweden. In 2007, whilst writing a book about motorcycles and electric vehicles, she called Bill Dube to ask for the permissions to use a photograph of his electric bike. She became part of the team that created the KillaCycle, and married the creator Bill Dubé eighteen months later. In 2010 she delivered a TEDx talk at the University of Denver, where she discussed environmentally friendly ways to race quickly. She completed a PhD in corrosion at the University of Denver in 2016.

== Research and career ==
In 2014 Håkansson broke the land speed record at the Bonneville Motorcycle Speed Trials in the custom-built KillaJoule. KillaJoule was the fastest electric motorcycle in the world. She was one of the faces of the Johnnie Walker campaign in 2015 alongside Jenson Button and Jude Law. In 2016, Håkansson broke the land speed record at the Bonneville Motorcycle Speed Trials, achieving 248 mph (399 km/h).

Håkansson teaches engineering design at the University of Auckland. In 2017 she reached 255.122 mph (410.579 km/h) in the Bonneville Motorcycle Speed Trials. She is now working on the Green Envy motorcycle. Green Envy uses computer-aided design and a 1,000 horsepower motor. She has been building the motorcycle in New Zealand, and plans to debut it in 2019.
