= Tony Posawatz =

American automotive engineer (born 1960)

Anthony L. Posawatz
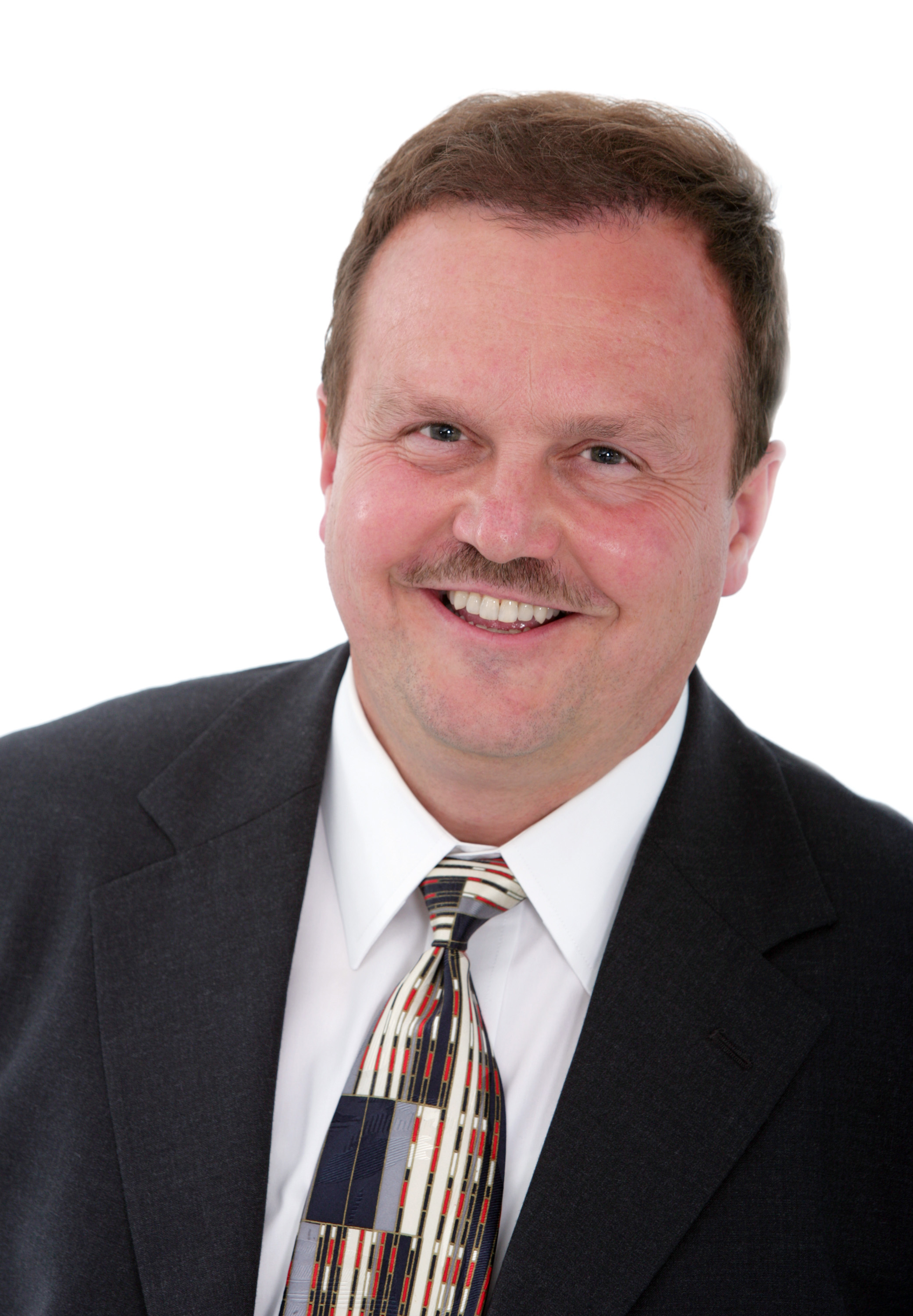
- Born: 1960 (age 65–66)
- Education: Tuck School of Business, (MBA)
- Occupations: Fisker Automotive, (CEO)
- Known for: Cadillac Escalade; Chevrolet Avalanche; Chevrolet Volt

Tony Posawatz (born 1960) is an American automotive engineer, best known for his work on the Chevrolet Volt, and in 2012 becoming chief executive of Fisker Automotive. He is a State of Michigan licensed Professional Engineer (P.E.).

== Education ==
Posawatz graduated from Wayne State University in 1982 with a Bachelor of Science degree in Mechanical Engineering, attending as a General Motors Scholar & Engineering Intern. In 1986, he obtained an MBA from the Tuck School of Business at Dartmouth College, supported by a General Motors Graduate Fellowship.

== Career ==
Posawatz joined General Motors in 1980. He rose through the ranks from assembly-plant foreman to the executive level as vehicle line director for several GM products, concluding as Vehicle Line Director for the Chevrolet Volt from 2006 to 2012. Prior to his work on electric vehicles he was Planning Director for the Full-size Truck, responsible for development of the Cadillac Escalade and Chevrolet Avalanche. He retired from GM in July 2012.

Posawatz was previously Chairman of the Board of the Electric Drive Transportation Association (EDTA).

In August 2012, he was appointed chief executive of California-based Fisker Automotive, replacing ex-Chrysler Tom LaSorda after only five months in post. Posawatz left Fisker in August 2013 and became CEO of an automotive and technology innovation consulting company Invictus iCar LLC.

In July 2023, Tony Posawatz was named the CEO of Fermata Energy, a Vehicle-to-Everything (V2X) bidirectional charging startup.

== Personal ==
Posawatz is married to an engineer and has two sons.
