= Fisker Atlantic =

Overview
- Manufacturer: Fisker Automotive
- Also called: Project Nina
- Production: 2012 (concept car); 2017 (proposed)
- Assembly: Wilmington Assembly in Wilmington, Delaware
- Designer: Henrik Fisker

Body and chassis
- Class: Compact executive car (D)
- Body style: 4-door sedan
- Layout: front-engine, rear-wheel-drive (four-wheel-drive optional)
- Related: Fisker Karma

Powertrain
- Engine: 2.0-liter turbocharged 4-cylinder BMW

The Fisker Atlantic was a plug-in hybrid concept car first shown to the public at the New York International Auto Show in April 2012. Produced by the American car manufacturer Fisker Automotive, it was to be a smaller addition to the range to sit below the Fisker Karma.

The Atlantic was scheduled to become Fisker Automotive's second production car, after plans to produce the Fisker Surf and Sunset variants of its full-size Karma were shelved earlier in 2012. Production was initially scheduled to begin by the end of 2012 at Wilmington Assembly, a former General Motors plant in Wilmington, Delaware. By October 2012, the carmaker decided to postpone production for late 2014 or 2015 due to financial constraints, but following Fisker's bankruptcy and subsequent purchase by Wanxiang, possible production of the Atlantic was postponed to the end of 2017.

Originally called "Project Nina", the Atlantic shares the range-extender system from the larger Karma, which employs a petrol engine that can be turned on to generate electricity to recharge the batteries and power the electric drive motors. A four-cylinder BMW petrol engine serves this role in the Atlantic. The Atlantic is rear-wheel drive, with the option of four-wheel drive.

Similar in design to the Karma, the Atlantic is a 4-door, 4-seat sedan with C-pillar door handles and it is a D-segment sedan. Although the details are not finalized, Fisker has compared the vehicle to the Audi A5 and BMW 335i in terms of size and price range. The expected all-electric range is 30 mi (48 km).

== See also ==
- Fisker Karma
- Plug-in electric vehicle
