= Fisker Automotive =

Defunct American motor vehicle manufacturer (2007–2014)

- Type: Private corporation
- Industry: Automotive; Luxury plug-in hybrid cars
- Founded: August 2007; 19 years ago (as Fisker Automotive); Anaheim, California, U.S.
- Founders: Henrik Fisker; Bernhard Koehler
- Defunct: 2014
- Fate: Declared bankruptcy in November 2013; assets bought by Wanxiang in February 2014 as foundation of Karma Automotive; Henrik Fisker subsequently founded Fisker Inc in 2016.
- Successor: Karma Automotive; Fisker Inc.
- Headquarters: Anaheim, California, U.S.
- Key people: Tony Posawatz (CEO); Bernhard Koehler (COO)
- Products: Karma
- Number of employees: 53 (March 2013)

Fisker Automotive was an American automobile company. It produced the Fisker Karma, which was one of the world's first production luxury plug-in hybrid electric vehicles. The company was founded in 2007 by Henrik Fisker, a Danish automobile designer.

The company received significant private and public investment, including a $529 million loan from the federal government. The company raised over $1 billion from private investors such as the Kleiner Perkins venture capital firm.

However, it repeatedly missed production deadlines, and production of the Fisker Karma was suspended in November 2012 with about 2,450 Karmas built since 2011 and just over 2,000 cars sold worldwide. The New York Times described the company as the "Solyndra of the electric car industry" and a "debacle". The company's federal loan was suspended in 2011; the government recovered some of the invested funds, but nevertheless took a $139 million loss.

In February 2014, Fisker Automotive's Karma vehicle design, tooling, and a manufacturing facility in Delaware were purchased by Chinese auto parts conglomerate Wanxiang Group. In 2016, Wanxiang renamed the holding company for the assets of Fisker Automotive to Karma Automotive.

== History ==
Henrik Fisker co-founded Fisker Automotive in 2007 with Fisker Coachbuild partner Bernhard Koehler and Quantum Technologies after securing U$5.2 million investment from Gianfranco Pizzuto, an Italian businessman, and Palo Alto Investors. Kleiner Perkins Caufield & Byers, a venture capital firm, was one of the early investors. Fisker was involved in the design of many premium cars such as the Aston Martin DB9 and V8 Vantage, Artega GT, and BMW Z8. He also served as design director and sat on the board at Aston Martin.

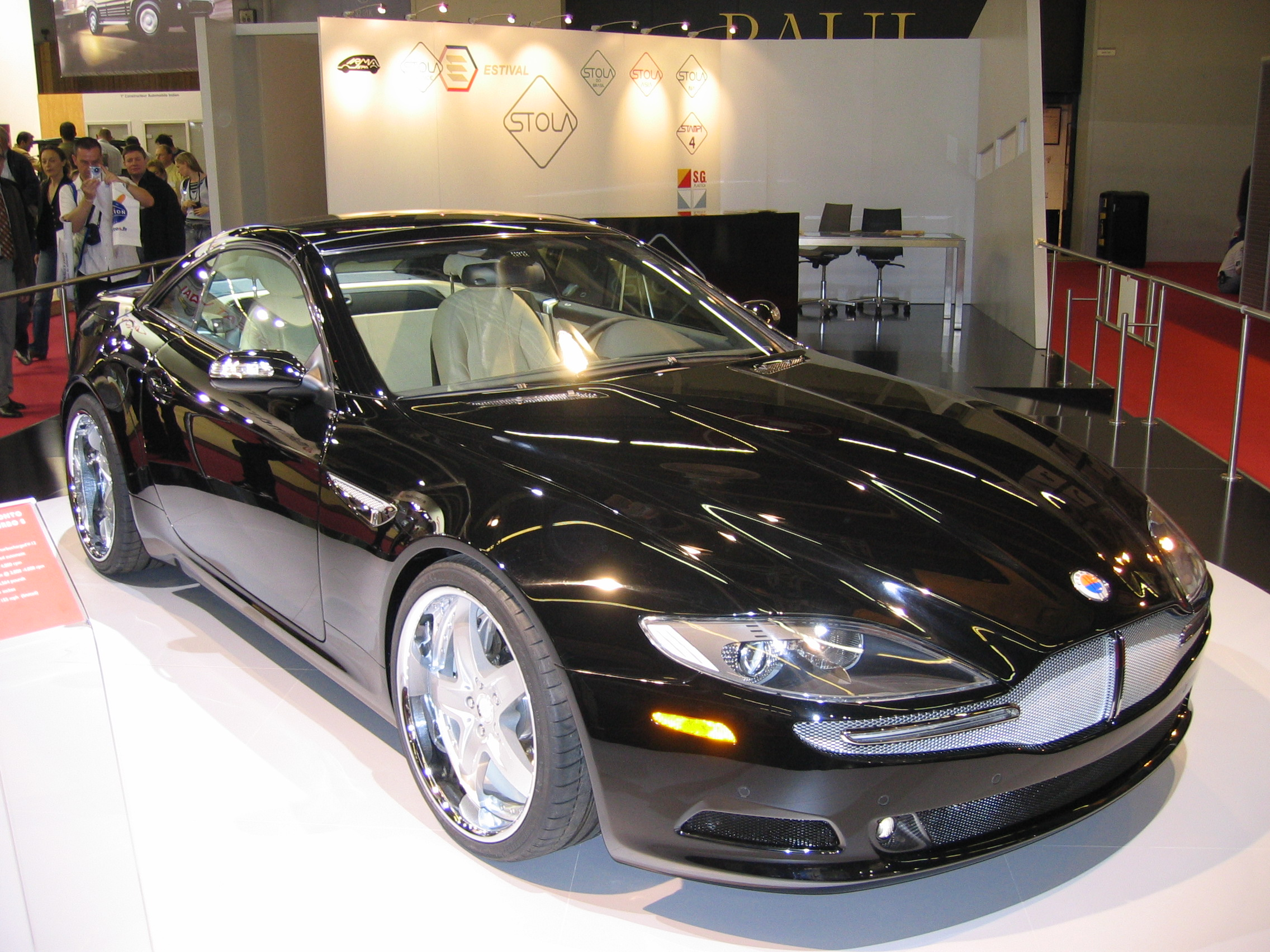
Fisker Tramonto at the 2006 Paris Motor Show

Before Fisker Automotive, Fisker and Koehler left Aston Martin in 2005 to establish Fisker Coachbuild, in an attempt to revive the art of coach-building automobiles to customer specifications. The Fisker Tramonto and Latigo used chassis and power trains from Mercedes-Benz SL and BMW 6 Series automobiles. Several were purchased, but the business soon gave way to Fisker Automotive, a true automobile manufacturer.

On April 14, 2008, Tesla Motors filed a lawsuit against Fisker Automotive, alleging they stole Tesla's technology and were using it to develop their own hybrid car, the Fisker Karma, which was announced at the North American International Auto Show in January 2008. Tesla's suit claimed that the design work done for the Model S by Fisker Coachbuild was substandard, and that Fisker diverted its best ideas to the Karma. In early 2009, the suit was settled in Fisker's favor and Tesla was ordered to pay Fisker more than US$1.1 million in legal fees.

In 2009, Fisker mentioned plans for another plug-in hybrid, a "high-volume vehicle for a lower price", subject to getting a U.S. Department of Energy loan to build about 100,000 vehicles annually in the United States.

Fisker's problems started with a recall of its battery by supplier A123 systems in December 2011, followed by a second recall in March 2012, and eventually A123 Systems' bankruptcy in August 2012. In addition to production stopping for over five months, with no date announced to recommence, the planned production of the second model, the Fisker Atlantic, was postponed, together with the cessation of development of the new model.

In February 2012, Tom LaSorda was named the new CEO, and Henrik Fisker became executive chairman, but six months later on August 14, La Sorda was replaced by Tony Posawatz, previously General Motors Vehicle Line Director for the Chevrolet Volt.

The company suffered a setback on October 29, 2012, when Hurricane Sandy flooded and destroyed its entire European shipment of 338 Karmas at Port Newark, New Jersey. Sixteen of the cars burned, because six to eight feet of seawater caused a short circuit in a vehicle control unit in one Karma, and high winds spread the resulting fire to 15 others. The company said that its lithium-ion battery was not at fault. Insurer XL Insurance America initially denied the roughly US$30 million loss claim and was subsequently sued by Fisker in New York State Supreme Court. The case was settled with an undisclosed out-of-court agreement.

Henrik Fisker resigned in March 2013, after "disagreements with management", in particular "disagreements over business strategy". Shortly after the departure of Henrik Fisker from Fisker Automotive, on April 5, 2013, Fisker laid off 75% of its workforce, retaining only a core group of 40 workers as it continued to negotiate with prospective investors.

On October 11, 2013, Hybrid Technology LLC agreed to buy Fisker's defaulted government loan at a heavy discount. On November 22, 2013, Fisker filed its Chapter 11 bankruptcy case. Concurrently, on November 23, 2013, Fisker agreed, subject to bankruptcy court approval, to be acquired by Hybrid, owned by Hong Kong billionaire, Richard Li. At the last moment, though, Chinese parts supplier Wanxiang Group submitted a competing bid of US$24.75 million, supported by the Official Creditors' Committee in the case. Wanxiang had earlier lost out to Hybrid in bidding for purchase of the government's loan to Fisker. Wanxiang owns A123 Systems LLC, Fisker's former battery supplier, and Fisker argued that Wanxiang's conduct was partly responsible for Fisker's business failure. As part of its bid, Wanxiang proposed restarting production of the Karma.

Wanxiang received court approval on February 18, 2014, to buy the assets of Fisker after a three-day auction against Hybrid with a bid of $149.2 million, with bidding starting at $55 million, significantly more than the previous $24.75 million bid, and significantly higher than the $25 million Hybrid Technology LLC paid the Department of Energy for a $164 million loan note. On top of the $25 million, the DOE also recouped $28 million from Fisker for a total of $53 million recovered of its $192 million loan.

Following Fisker Automotive's structured bankruptcy auction in February 2014, Henrik Fisker retained the Fisker logo and trademarks. Wanxiang Group then transformed the assets of Fisker Automotive into a new company named Karma Automotive, thus launching the Karma Revero plug-in hybrid car based on the Fisker Karma. Henrik Fisker would later start another electric vehicle company named Fisker Inc. in 2016 with the Fisker logo and trademarks.

== Leadership ==
- Henrik Fisker (2007–2012)
- Tom LaSorda (2012)
- Tony Posawatz (2012–2013)

== Production models ==
=== Fisker Karma ===
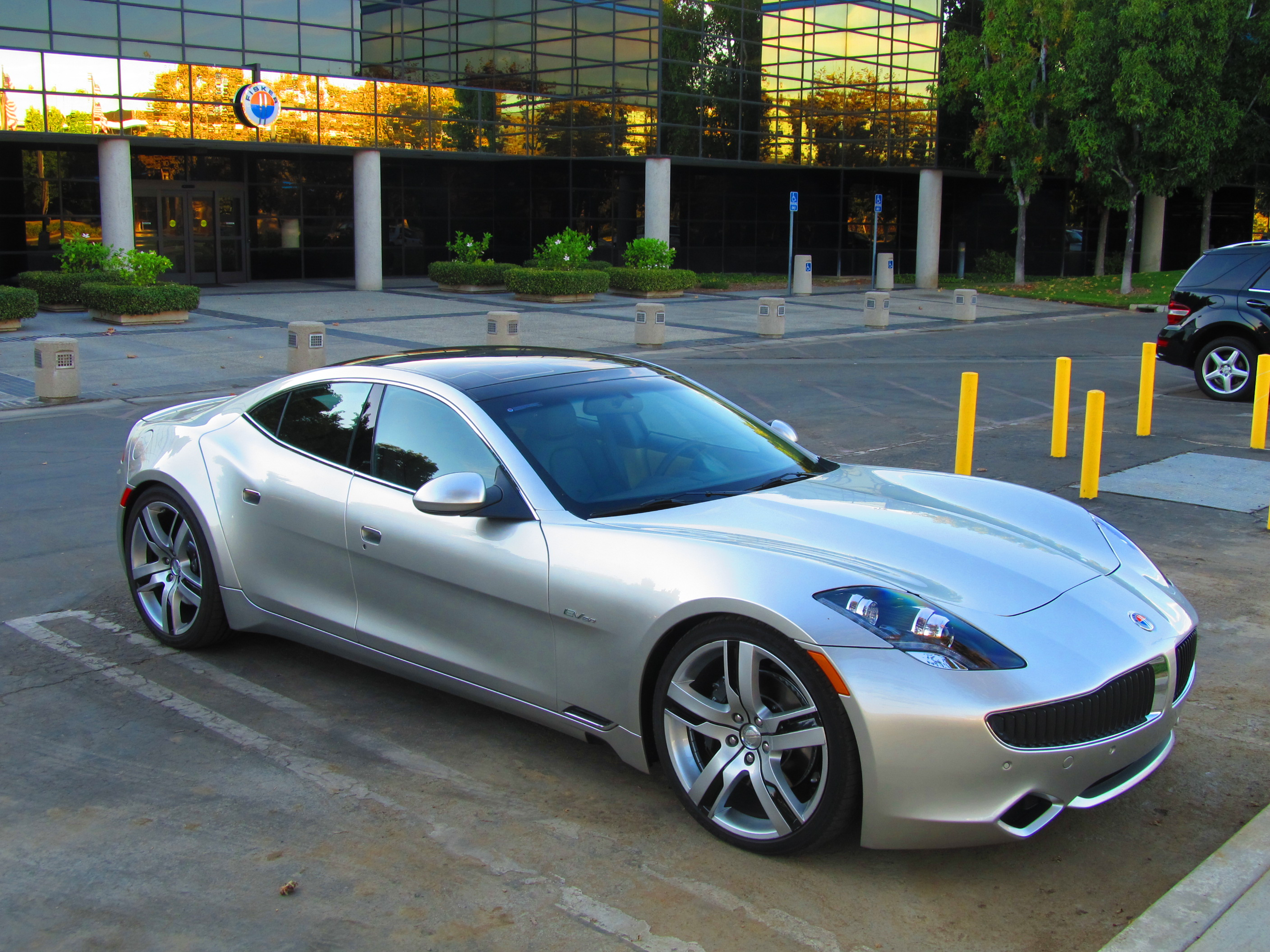
Fisker Karma outside the Fisker headquarters in Anaheim, California

The Karma was a plug-in hybrid luxury sports sedan produced by Fisker Automotive and manufactured at Valmet Automotive in Finland. After missing its initial late 2009 launch, and after the launch was rescheduled several times, the first deliveries took place in the U.S. in late July 2011 and deliveries to retail customers began in November 2011.

The 20.1 kWh (72.36 MJ) lithium ion rechargeable battery in each car came from A123 Systems in Watertown, Massachusetts. The aluminum frame was engineered by Fisker and was supplied by Norsk Hydro from Norway. The cabin interior was designed by Fisker Automotive, but was made in the United States by Magna International of Canada. The EVer powertrain system, technically a series hybrid, delivered over 400 horsepower, and was inspired by Quantum Technologies, a cofounder of and early investor in Fisker. A version of the Karma was relaunched as the Karma Revero in 2016 by Karma Automotive.

== Concept models ==
=== Fisker Sunset ===
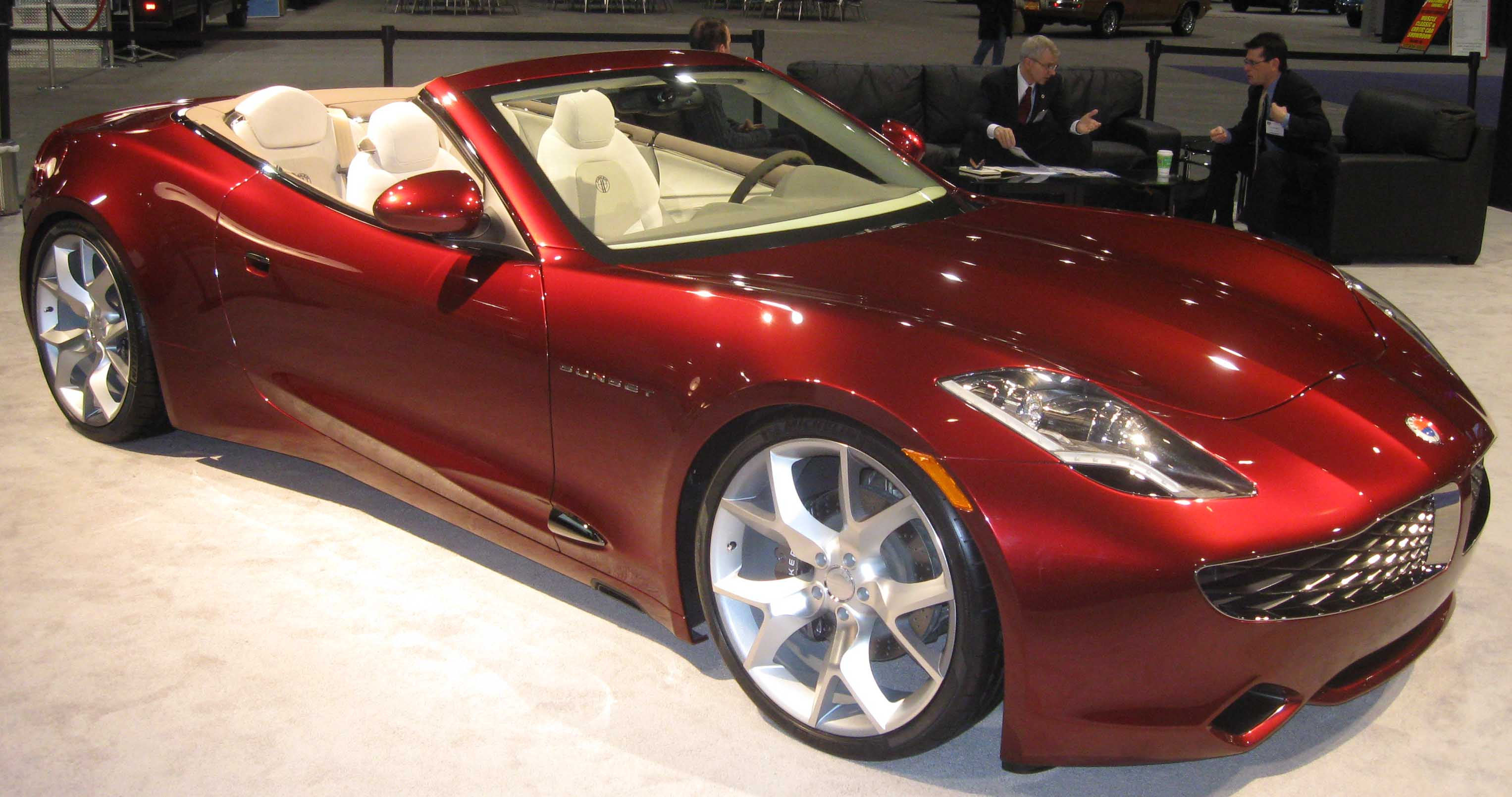
Fisker Sunset

At the 2009 Detroit Auto Show, Fisker showed a short wheelbase hardtop convertible version of the Karma called the Sunset, with the intent of series production.

=== Fisker Surf ===
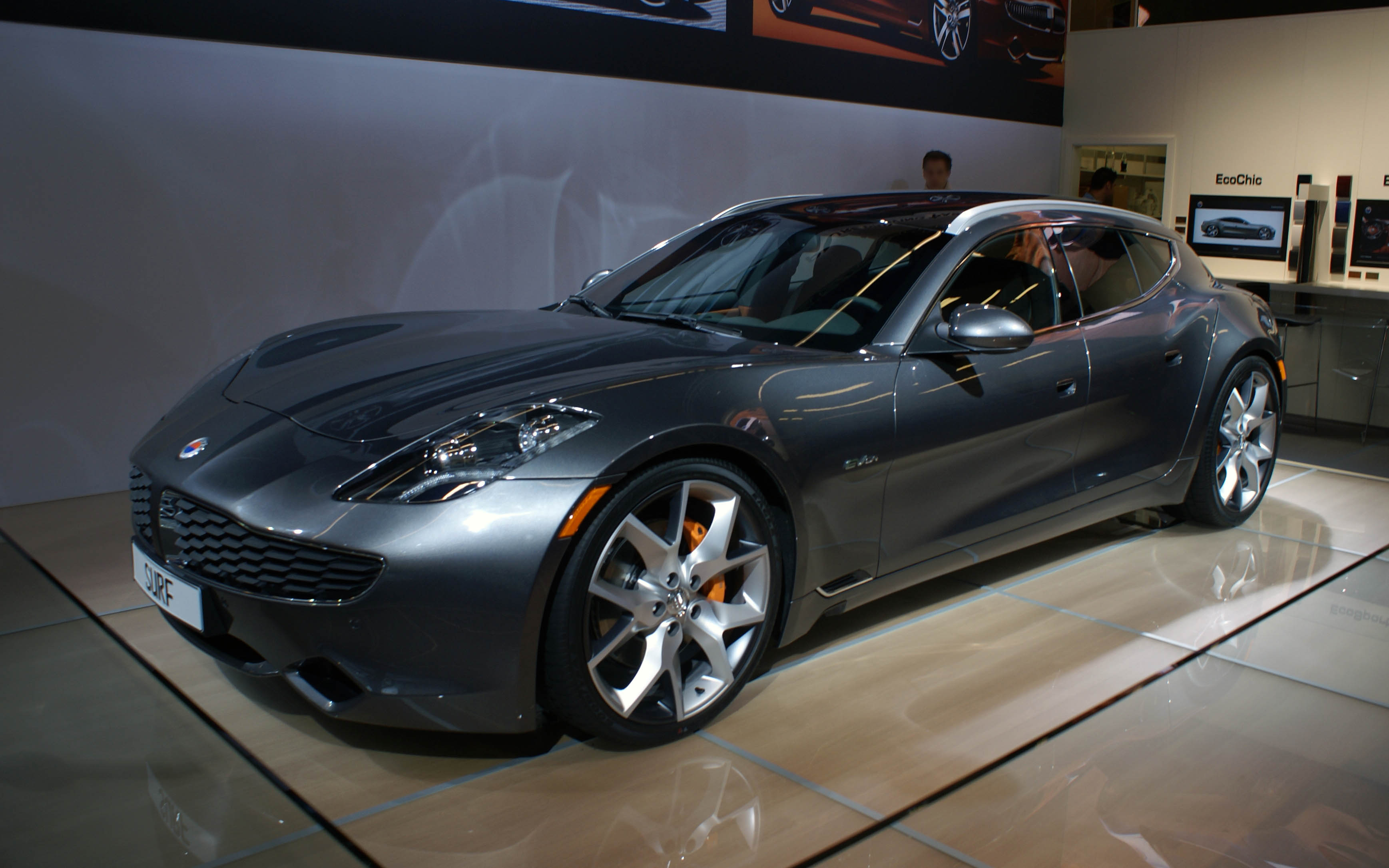
Fisker Surf

At the 2011 Frankfurt Auto Show, Fisker showed the Surf, a concept model based on the Karma with a station wagon bodystyle. According to Fisker this bodystyle had been planned from the beginning of design work on the Karma. Fisker described the Surf as a "merger of a sports car with a station wagon" and said he was inspired by cars such as the Jensen Interceptor and Lamborghini Espada. In August 2012 Fisker announced that the Sunset and the Surf were both on hold, as the company had decided to focus on the planned mid-sized Atlantic sedan.

=== Fisker Atlantic ===
The Atlantic was intended to be Fisker's entry into the midsize sedan segment, similar in size to cars such as the Audi A5. Originally under development as "Project Nina", Fisker had reached a deal with BMW for them to supply turbocharged 2.0 liter four cylinder engines for the Atlantic, with the car using a similar plug in hybrid system as the Karma.

== Sales ==
By February 2012, Fisker had established 45 dealerships in the US and three in Canada. By March 2012, the company had built over 2,450 vehicles, with over 2000 cars delivered to customers by the end of 2012. Fisker Automotive distributed vehicles through a traditional dealer network and partnered with five importers: GP Supercars (Merano, Italy), Nellemann (Copenhagen, Denmark); the Emil Frey Group (Zurich, Switzerland); BD Otomotive (Istanbul, Turkey) and Al-Futtaim Group (Middle East and North Africa).

== Manufacturing ==
Fisker Automotive used to retain core competencies, such as design, engineering and marketing, in house, but outsourced manufacturing of its first vehicle Fisker Karma. Fisker's outsourcing methods allowed the company a 2–3 year period of development instead of the typical 5 years and at a cost of US$333 million instead of $1 billion, and claimed that it could make a profit from selling just 15,000 cars. Fisker used to save significant development costs by using pre-engineered components developed by other car companies whenever possible, such as the door handle mechanism which was a General Motors part; Fisker Automotive just paid a royalty to GM for each door handle in the Karma, which was much cheaper than designing its own door handles. However, the A123 battery failure and its resulting recall, and the eventual bankruptcy of the battery supplier, led to significant problems and added cost to the manufacture of the Karma model, finally resulting in Fisker's bankruptcy.

In 2008, Fisker estimated 15,000 cars per year would be assembled by Valmet Automotive in Uusikaupunki, Finland. Manufacturing eventually commenced in 2011 but by the third quarter of 2012 production ceased.

Then-Vice President of the United States Joe Biden (later President) attended the October 27, 2009, announcement that Fisker Automotive would take control of the Boxwood Road Plant (previously owned and operated by General Motors as Wilmington Assembly) in Wilmington, Delaware, with production scheduled to begin in late 2012. This never happened and the plant was ultimately torn down.

== Funding ==
Fisker Automotive's investors have included Leonardo DiCaprio, Palo Alto Investors, Kleiner Perkins Caufield & Byers, Qatar Holdings, LLC, A123 Systems, and Ace Investments.

In April 2012, Fisker announced it had received $392 million in a round of financing, which was in addition to $850 million in private investment it had received in previous rounds. In Fisker's bankruptcy case, Hybrid Technology LLC ranked ahead of all the equity investors as a senior creditor since they purchased the Department of Energy loan note to Fisker Automotive in November 2013. In total, the company raised well over $1 billion from private investors.

Fisker had received a US$528.7 million conditional loan in September 2009 from the Department of Energy's US$25 billion Advanced Technologies Vehicle Manufacturing Loan Program (ATVM). Of the total loan amount approved, a total of US$192 million was drawn by Fisker Automotive for engineering work with primarily US suppliers to complete the Fisker Karma and Fisker's Project Nina, later revealed as the Fisker Atlantic.

The Department of Energy froze Fisker's credit line in August 2012 after US$192 million had been drawn, and after differences between the DOE and Fisker on the milestones set as conditions for the loan. The loan received additional scrutiny for being awarded for the manufacture of luxury vehicles that are too expensive for much of the general public. Fisker investor Ray Lane responded that the issues were being blown out of proportion due to election-year politics.

== See also ==
- List of hybrid vehicles
- List of modern production plug-in electric vehicles
- Fisker Coachbuild (2005–2007)
- Karma Automotive (2014–present)
- Fisker Inc. (2016–2024)
- VLF Automotive
- Tesla, Inc.
