= Fisker Karma =

American-Finnish hybrid electric sports sedan (2011–2012)

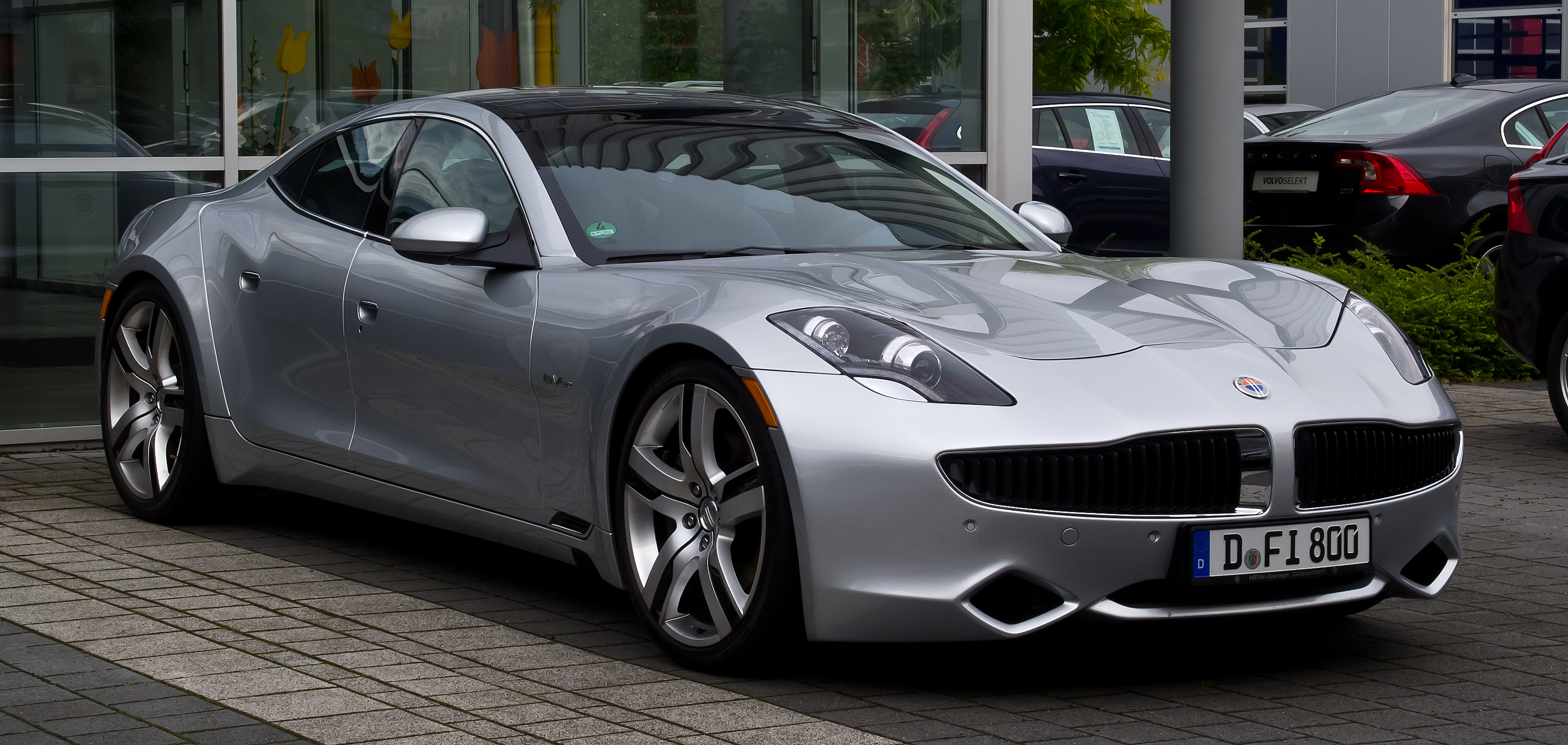

Overview
- Manufacturer: Fisker Automotive
- Production: 2011–2012
- Assembly: Finland: Uusikaupunki (Valmet Automotive)
- Designer: Henrik Fisker

Body and chassis
- Class: Full-size luxury car
- Body style: 4-door sedan
- Layout: Front-engine, rear-wheel drive
- Platform: GM E-Flex Platform
- Related: VLF Destino; Karma Revero; Chevrolet Volt Concept

Powertrain
- Engine: 2.0 L (121.9 cu in) turbocharged Ecotec VVT DI LNF I4
- Electric motor: two 120 kW (161 hp) motors, 479 N·m torque each
- Transmission: 1-speed
- Hybrid drivetrain: Plug-in series hybrid. The two electric motors drive the rear wheels through a limited-slip differential
- Battery: 20.1 kWh (72.4 MJ) lithium-ion battery
- Range: 230 mi (370 km)
- Electric range: 32 mi (51 km) (EPA); 83 km (52 mi) (TÜV)
- Plug-in charging: 3.3 kW (220 V 15 A as for UK) on-board charger on IEC Type 1 inlet (SAE-J1772-2009)

Dimensions
- Wheelbase: 124.4 in (3,160 mm)
- Length: 195.67 in (4,970 mm)
- Width: 78.11 in (1,984 mm)
- Height: 51.57 in (1,310 mm)
- Curb weight: 5,300 lb (2,400 kg)

Chronology
- Successor: Karma Revero

The Fisker Karma is a luxury plug-in range-extended electric sports sedan produced by Fisker Automotive between 2011 and 2012. The cars were manufactured by Valmet Automotive in Finland.

The United States Environmental Protection Agency (EPA) rated the Karma's combined city/highway fuel economy at 52 mpg_{‑US} (4.5 L/100 km; 62 mpg_{‑imp}) equivalent (MPG-e) in all-electric mode, and at 20 mpg_{‑US} (12 L/100 km; 24 mpg_{‑imp}) in gasoline-only mode. EPA's official all-electric range is 32 mi (51 km). Due to the very small cabin interior volume, the EPA rated the Fisker Karma as a subcompact car.

The first deliveries took place in the U.S. in late July 2011, and deliveries to retail customers began in November 2011. Pricing in the U.S. started at US$102,000 for the base model (EcoStandard), US$110,000 for the intermediate EcoSport model and US$116,000 for the top model (the "Animal Free" EcoChic). Around 1,800 units were delivered in North America and Europe through December 2012. The U.S. was the leading market, with about 1,600 units sold.

Production was suspended in November 2012 when the sole battery supplier to Fisker Automotive, A123 Systems, filed for bankruptcy following two battery recalls. Fisker Automotive was unable to carry on production of the Fisker Karma in the absence of its sole battery supplier, with about 2,450 Karmas built since 2011.

After furloughing its US workers in late March 2013, Fisker Automotive filed for bankruptcy in November 2013, after the United States Department of Energy auctioned its debt and sold it to Hybrid Technology LLC for US$25 million.

Following the sale of some of the assets of the company, the designs, rights to a plug-hybrid powertrain and a manufacturing facility in Delaware to the Chinese company Wanxiang, the new owners re-commenced production in September 2016 under the brand name Karma Automotive.

After several announcements by the Wanxiang Group to reintroduce an upgraded version of the Fisker Karma, the car was renamed the Karma Revero and Karma Automotive started taking orders in September 2016.

== History ==
The Fisker Karma was revealed at the 2008 North American International Auto Show in Detroit. It was the first car from Fisker Automotive, a then new auto maker based in Anaheim, California, founded on September 5, 2007.

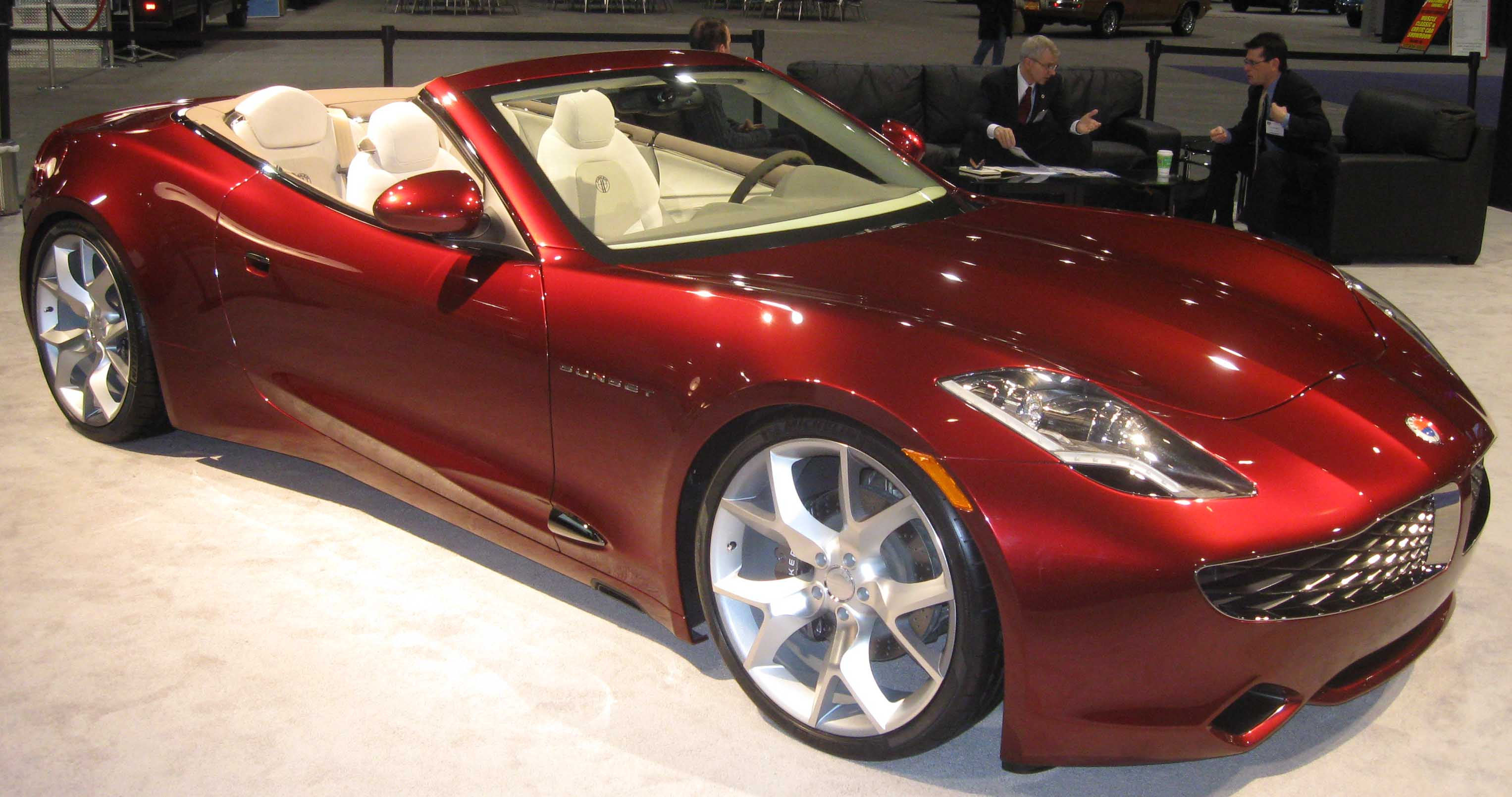
Fisker Sunset concept

Production began in July 2011, and the first two deliveries took place in the United States on July 26, 2011. In October 2011 the first Karma delivered in the UK was auctioned to benefit Pratham UK and raised a bid of £140,000 (around US$220,000). At the 2009 Detroit Auto Show, Fisker showed a short wheelbase convertible version called Fisker Sunset, with the intent of series production. At the 2011 Frankfurt Motor Show, Fisker showed a Sports Wagon version of the Karma called the Fisker Surf. Aside from the modified rear end, the Surf also received a three-dimensional honeycomb grille. According to Fisker, this bodystyle had been planned from the beginning of design work on the Karma. In August 2012 Fisker announced that the Sunset and the Surf were both on hold, as the company had decided to focus on the planned mid-sized Atlantic sedan.

Following the sale to Chinese company Wanxiang of assets, designs, rights to a plug-hybrid powertrain, and a manufacturing facility in Delaware, the new owners in September 2016 commenced production under the name Karma Automotive. After several announcements by Wanxiang Group that they would reintroduce an upgraded version of the Fisker Karma, it was renamed the Karma Revero and launched with booking scheduled then too.

== Specifications ==
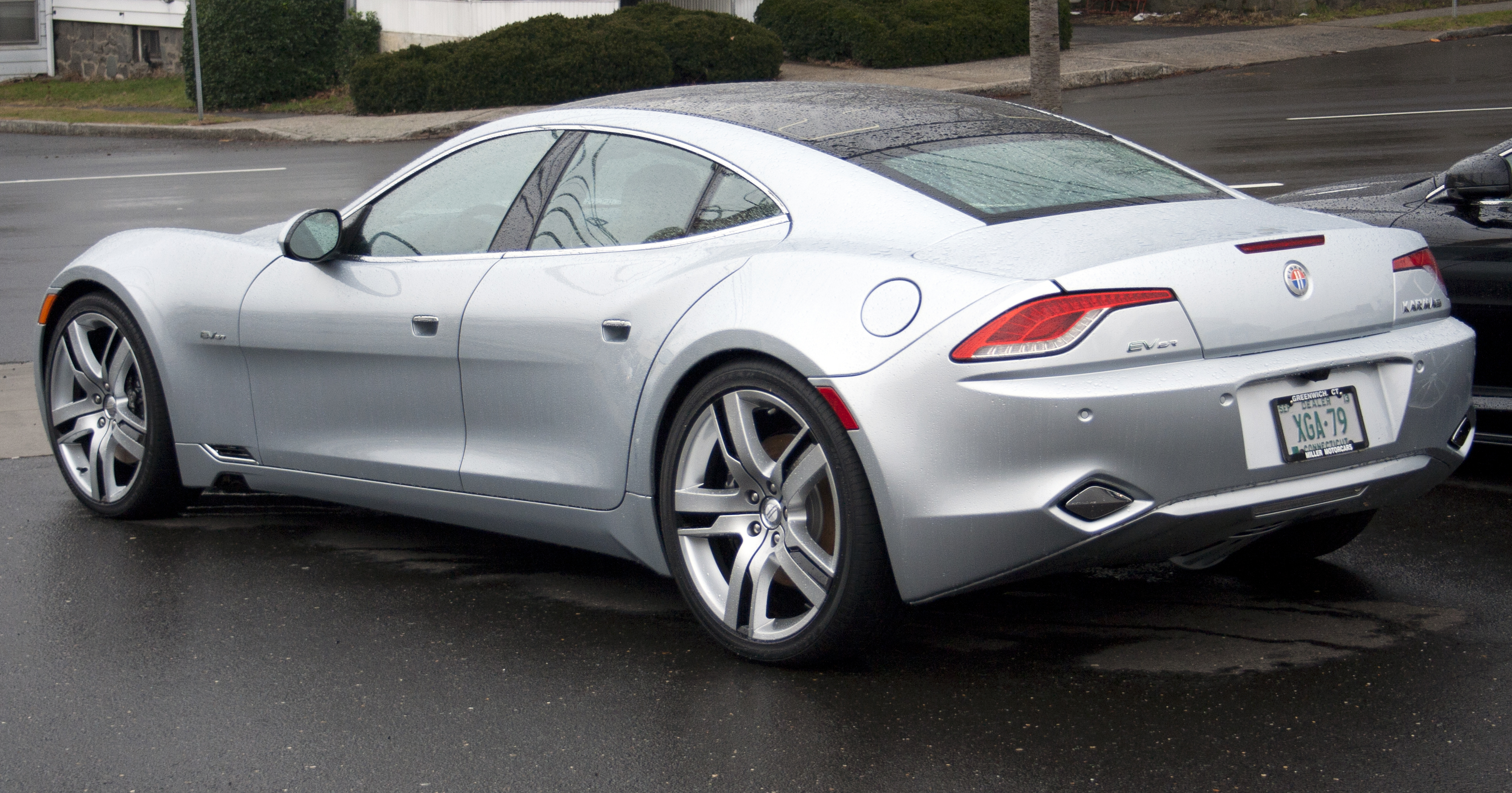
Fisker EVer Karma (US)

The Karma is a range-extended electric vehicle or series hybrid driven by a pair of 120 kW (161 hp) electric motors that receive power from a 20.1 kWh lithium ion battery supplied by A123 Systems and/or an engine powered generator. The battery pack runs down the center of the car, between the pairs of left-hand and right-hand seats, preventing a rear bench and seating four rather than five passengers. Once the battery is depleted, or when the driver activates the "Sport" paddle on the steering wheel, the front-mounted 260 hp, 2.0-liter Ecotec four-cylinder direct-injection turbocharged gasoline engine powers a generator that sends electricity directly to the drive motors. The engine is sourced from General Motors. The battery can also be charged from the grid, making the vehicle a type of plug-in hybrid electric vehicle (PHEV).

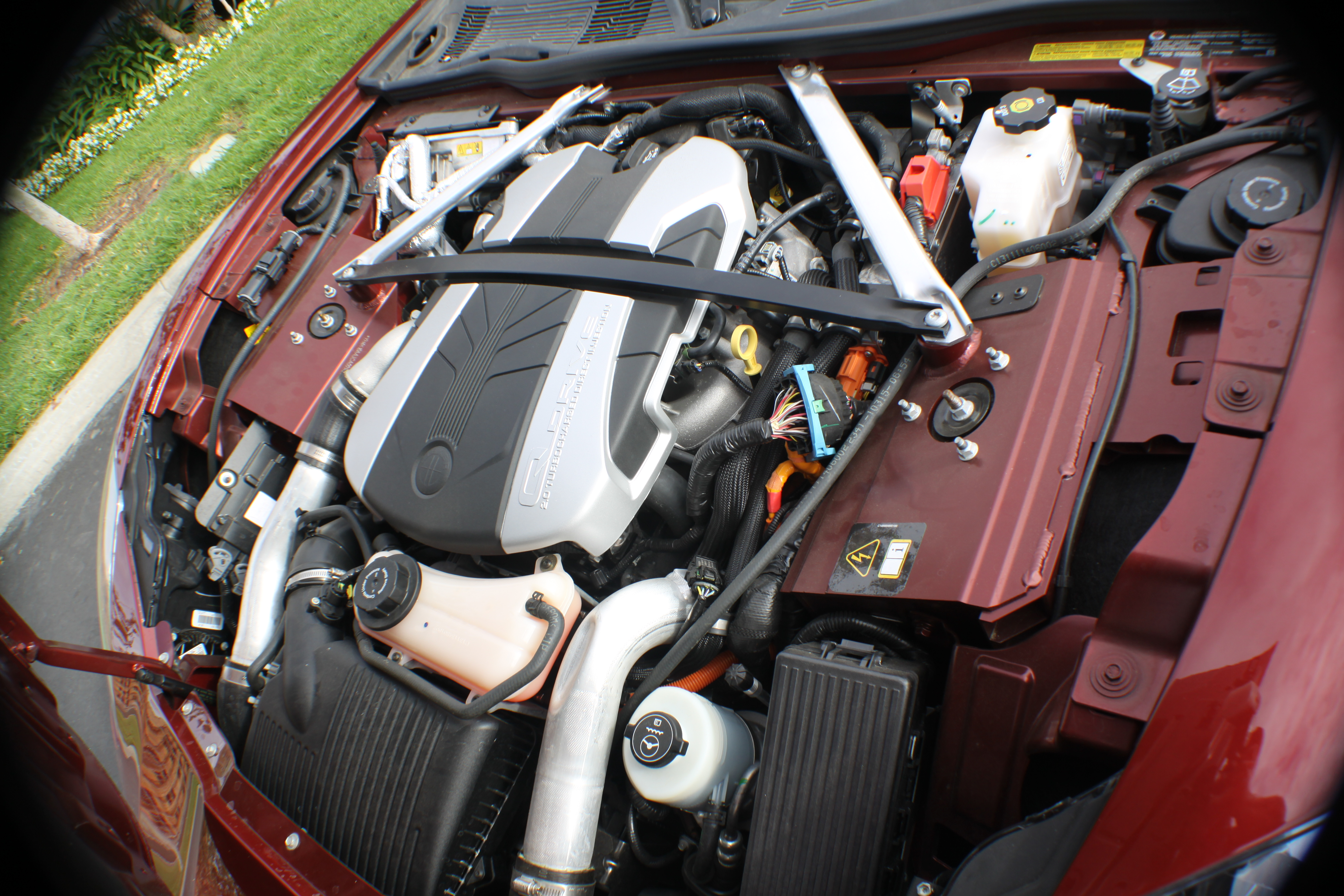
Fisker Karma hybrid engine, 2012

The Karma's engine is mated with a generator to provide an electrical connection to the motors and also recharge the batteries, and as such the electric motors are the only mechanical driving force connected to the wheels. However, in all-electric mode, the Karma is around half as efficient as the Chevrolet Volt. The Karma's curb weight is 5,300 lb (2,400 kg).

The Karma includes as standard a solar paneled roof manufactured by Asola Advanced and Automotive Solar Systems GmbH, a Quantum Technologies affiliate, to aid the cabin climate control system. The solar roof is capable of generating a half kilowatt-hour a day and was estimated to provide up to 4 to 5 miles (6.4–8.0 km) of additional range a week assuming continuously sunny days; however, the solar panels as delivered only recharge the 12-volt lead-acid accessory battery.

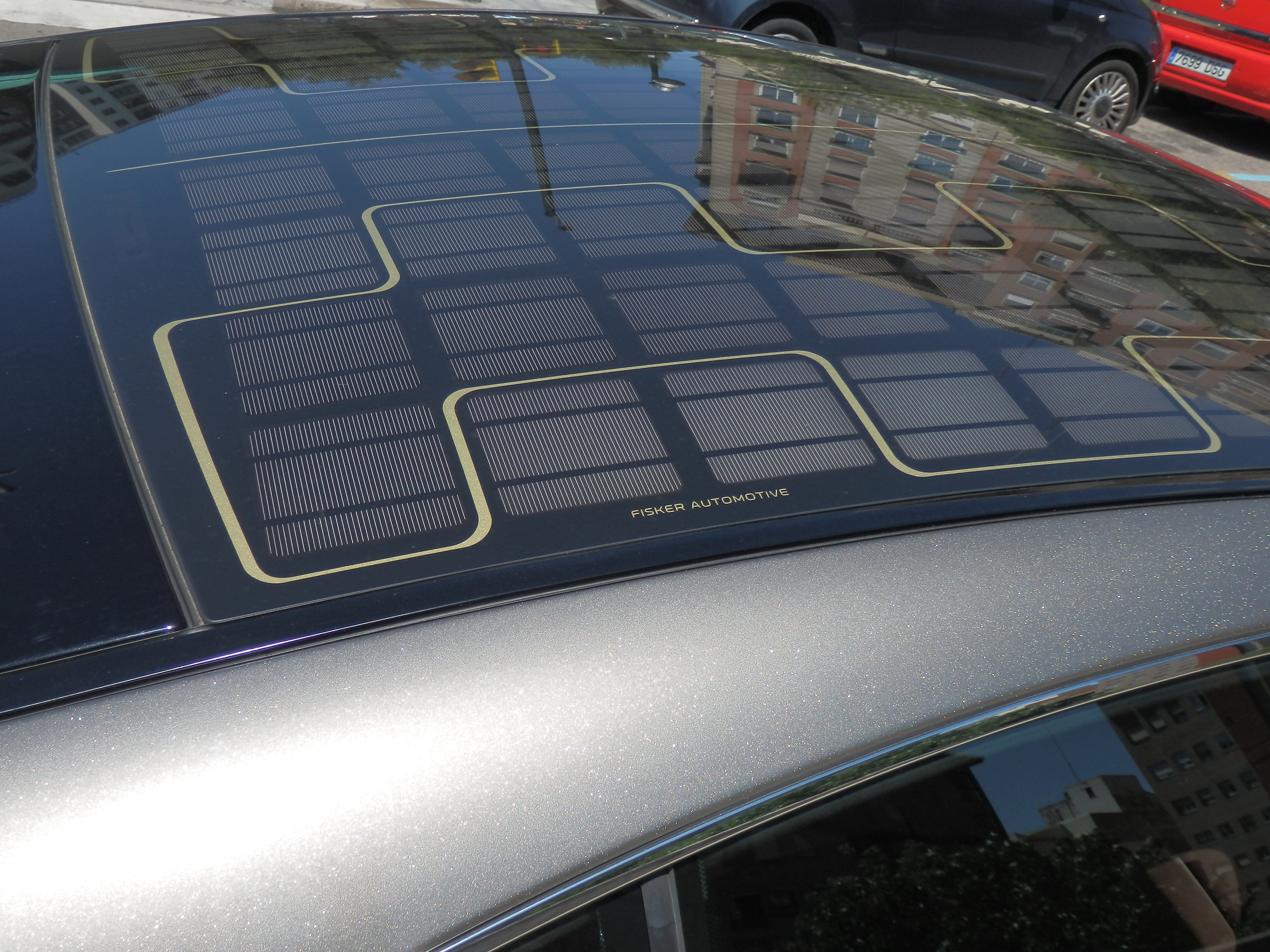
Fisker Karma solar panelled roof

The base model of the Karma features an "eco-friendly interior", including salvaged/reclaimed lumber. Optional leather seating is available, but it will use much more of the cow hide than would customarily be found on luxury models; hides with scratches and other marks (which should not affect functionality) will be used. The EcoChic version featured a natural fabric interior with an ultrasuede dash, as part of Fisker's ecological "animal-free" offering and with real leaf fossils embedded in door and central console glass inserts.

The Karma has a warning sound system designed to alert pedestrians of its presence. The warning sound is emitted automatically and activated only when the car is traveling in all-electric mode at less than 25 mph (40 km/h).

=== Performance ===
The Karma's two electric motors produce 201 bhp (204 PS) each for a quoted total of 403 hp (301 kW; 409 PS) and 1,300 N⋅m (959 lb⋅ft) of torque. The Karma features a 125 mph (201 km/h) top speed and is capable of reaching 60 mph (97 km/h) from a standstill in 5.9 seconds in Sport Mode according to Fisker.

== Fuel economy and range ==
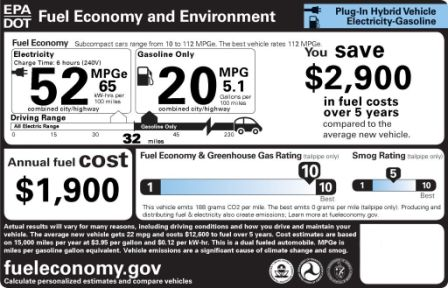
Monroney label showing EPA's fuel economy and environmental comparison label for the 2012 Fisker Karma

The Environmental Protection Agency (EPA) official all-electric range for the Fisker Karma is 32 mi (51 km) under the agency's five-cycle tests using varying driving conditions and climate controls. EPA's estimated energy consumption is 65 kWh per 100 miles (1462 kJ/km). The total range with a full tank of gasoline and a fully charged battery is 230 miles (370 km). EPA's official rating for combined city/highway fuel economy in all-electric mode is 52 miles per gallon gasoline equivalent (MPG-e) (4.5 L gasoline equivalent/100 km; 62 mpg-imp gasoline equivalent). The EPA rating in gasoline-only mode is 20 mpg_{‑US} (12 L/100 km; 24 mpg_{‑imp}).

The German Technical Inspection Association (TÜV) found through independent tests that the Fisker Karma has an all-electric range of 83 km (52 mi) in stealth (all-electric) mode. TÜV found that in charge-sustaining sport mode the Karma achieves a fuel economy of 26 mpg (9.2 L/100 km). The combined fuel economy was rated at 112 MPG-e (2.1 l/100 km equivalent) and the emissions level is 51 g/km CO_{2}.

== Production and delivery ==
Fisker Automotive and Valmet Automotive reached agreement in 2008 to manufacture the Karma in Uusikaupunki, Finland, with the final assembly contract signed by both parties on November 13, 2008.

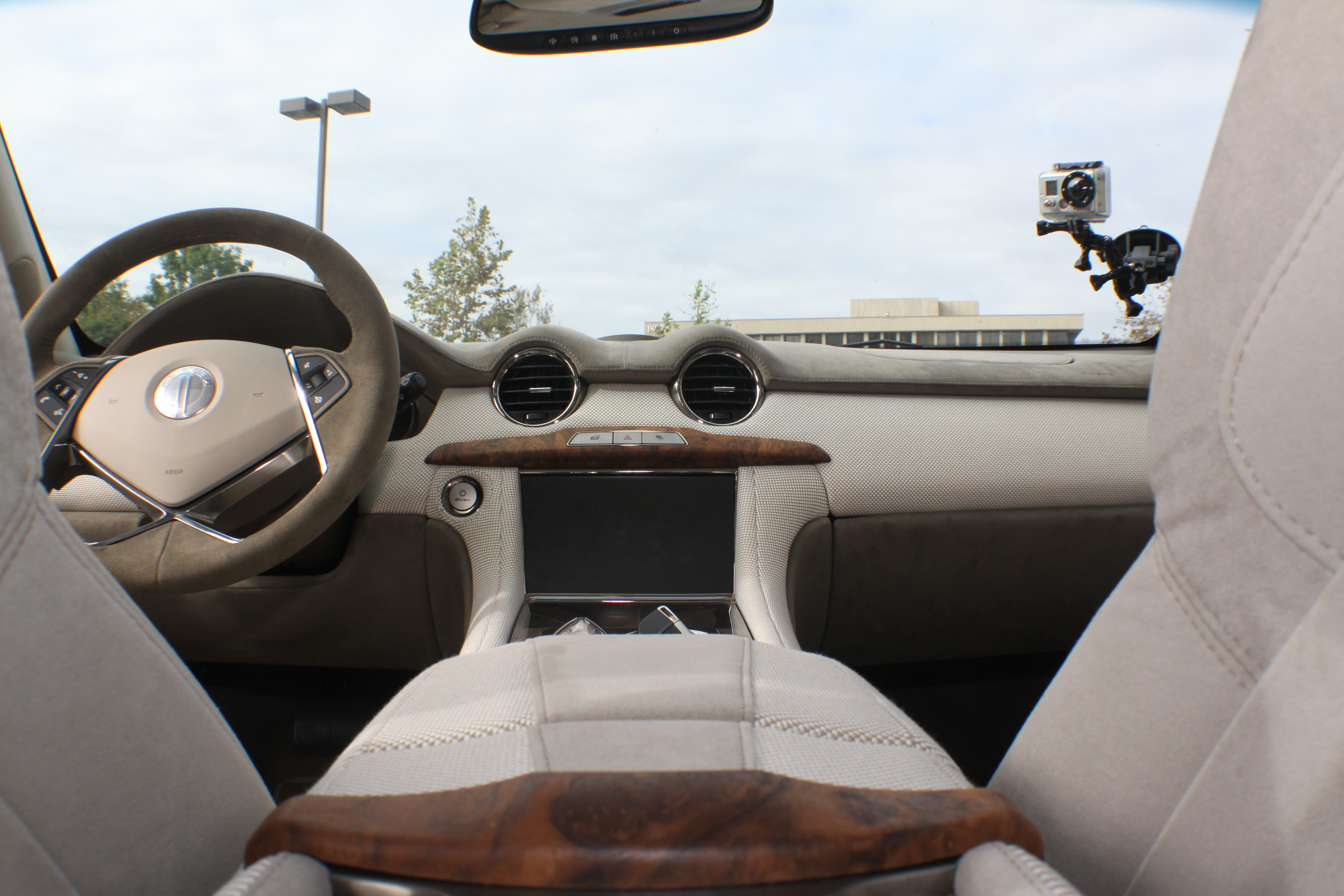
Interior

In 2008 Fisker Automotive began accepting pre-orders in the United States, and Europe and initially scheduled sales of its Karma PHEV by the fourth quarter of 2009 in the United States, and starting in 2010 in Europe. In 2009 Henrik Fisker reported 1,300 orders for the Karma. Henrik Fisker showed the first production model Karma at the 2010 Paris Motor Show. In July 2011, Fisker stated that it had received 3,000 pre-orders and that the plug-in hybrid was sold out until early 2012.

After rescheduling the Karma market launch to September 2010, and missing its target to build 70 to 100 test cars in 2010, production began in July 2011, and the two first deliveries took place in the United States during the same month. The Valmet plant in Finland began production with five cars a week. By December 2011 the production rate was 25 units a day. Production was suspended in November 2012 due to financial difficulties, with about 2,450 Karmas built since 2011. As a result of flash floods caused by Hurricane Sandy in October 2012, 16 Karmas caught fire and another 330 units were lost when an entire shipment from Europe was flooded while being parked at Port Newark–Elizabeth Marine Terminal.

Deliveries to retail customers in the U.S. began in November 2011. In the United States the first vehicles were sold for US$95,900 for the basic model, and US$109,850 for the top model. In December 2011 prices were raised to US$102,000 for the base EcoStandard model, and US$116,000 for the top model, the EcoChic.

=== Retail sales ===
Over 2,000 Karmas were delivered to customers in North America and Europe through December 2012, of which, around 200 were delivered in 2011 and approximately 1,800 in 2012. About 1,600 units were sold in the United States through December 2013. A total of 533 units were sold in Europe through December 2014. The Netherlands was the top selling European market for the Karma, with 166 units sold through June 2013. A total of 55 Karmas were sold in Switzerland through June 2013, 52 in Belgium through November 2012, and 44 in France through December 2014.

== Reception and controversies ==
=== Government investment ===
In 2010, the United States Department of Energy awarded Fisker a US$529 million green-energy loan, primarily to assist the company in transitioning the Karma, which is assembled in Finland, into the American markets. Fisker collected nearly US$200 million until February 2012, when the government froze the loan, because the company was failing to meet the government's milestones. Three months later, in May, Fisker spokesman Roger Ormisher told ABC News that negotiations with the DOE were ongoing, and "We're hoping for a conclusion fairly soon."

=== Top Gear ===
The Karma was praised on the British television series Top Gear for its looks and hybrid technology while being road-tested by presenter James May and special guest, AC/DC front-man Brian Johnson. Johnson noted that it is probably one of the first production cars that actually looks like the concept version that is sketched beforehand, saying, "It's a cracking looking jam-jar". May noticed similarities in the hybrid-powertrain to his own idea that was used in a segment for Top Gear a few years earlier (The Hammerhead Eagle i-Thrust), though he admits that his idea was very crudely executed. He joked that Fisker would be hearing soon from his lawyers. After his test of the Karma EcoChic, James May awarded it his Top Gear "Car of the Year Award" for 2011.

== Recalls ==
In December 2011, Fisker recalled the first 239 Karmas built from July through November 3, 2011, and delivered to the US, due to a risk of battery fire caused by coolant leak. Of the 239 cars, fewer than fifty had been delivered to customers, the rest were in dealerships, and at that time no car had been involved in a fire. In the report filed by Fisker Automotive with the National Highway Traffic Safety Administration (NHTSA), the carmaker said some hose clamps were not properly positioned, which could allow a coolant leak. "If coolant enters the battery compartment an electrical short could possibly occur, causing a thermal event within the battery, including a possible fire in the [worst] case." The problem was discovered on December 16 at the Valmet Automotive assembly plant in Finland when workers noticed coolant dripping.

On January 2, 2012, Fisker announced that most customer cars and cars stocked in dealerships affected by the recall involving A123 Systems-supplied battery packs are back in service. The vehicles have either had brand new battery packs installed or the confirmed repair to the hose clamp assembly undertaken. The remaining customers have been contacted and appointments were made for their replacement battery installation.

On August 18, 2012, Fisker announced it is recalling about 2,400 Karma plug-in hybrids to repair a faulty cooling fan unit.

=== Consumer Reports test drive ===
On March 7, 2012, a Fisker Karma purchased for US$107,850 by Consumer Reports magazine was taken out for a test drive at the 327-acre (132 ha) CR test track facility in Connecticut. The Karma had fewer than 200 miles (320 km) on its odometer. While performing a routine speedometer calibration check prior to actual road testing, the car broke down and could not be restarted. "We buy about 80 cars a year and this is the first time in memory that we have had a car that is undriveable before it has finished our check-in process." The fault was traced to a defective battery caused by a misaligned welding robot at the A123 factory. The battery was replaced in a week. A123 is replacing affected batteries in the Karma and four other customers to a cost of $55 million. Warranty for the Karma will be extended to 60 months and 60,000 miles in North America.

=== Fire incidents ===
A Fisker Karma was involved in a home fire that also burned two other cars in Fort Bend County, Texas in May 2012. The chief fire investigator said the Karma was the origin of the fire that spread to the house, but the exact cause is still unknown. The plug-in electric car was not plugged in at the time the fire started and it was reported that the Karma's battery was intact. The carmaker released a public statement saying that there was uncertainty and conflicting reports surrounding the event. Fisker Automotive also stated that the battery pack "does not appear to have been a contributing factor in this incident." The NHTSA is conducting a field inquiry of the incident, and is working with insurance adjusters and Fisker to determine the fire's cause.

A second fire incident took place in August 2012 when a Karma caught fire while stopped at a parking lot in Woodside, California. According to Fisker engineers, the area of origin for the fire was determined to be outside the engine compartment, as the fire was located at the driver's side front corner of the car. The evidence suggested that the ignition source was not the lithium-ion battery pack, new technology components or unique exhaust routing. The investigation conducted by Fisker engineers and an independent fire expert concluded that the cause of the fire was a low temperature cooling fan located at the left front of the Karma, forward of the wheel. An internal fault caused the fan to fail, overheat and started a slow-burning fire. Fisker announced a recall to repair the faulty cooling fan unit.

In separate incidents during the storm and flooding caused by Hurricane Sandy on the night of October 29, 2012, 16 Karmas and one Toyota Prius Plug-in Hybrid caught fire while parked at Port Newark-Elizabeth Marine Terminal. The vehicles were partially submerged by flash floods caused by the hurricane. Initially, a Fisker Automotive spokesman said the company "can't be certain exactly what happened at the port" but "we think being submerged in 13 feet of saltwater had something to do with it". The carmaker clarified that the Karmas were not charging at the time of the fire and there were no injuries. In the case of the Toyota's incident, a Prius PHV burned and two other Prius, a conventional hybrid and a plug-in, just smoldered. A Toyota spokeswoman said the fire "likely started because saltwater got into the electrical system". She also clarified that the incident affected only three cars out of the 4,000 Toyotas that were at the terminal during the storm, including more than 2,128 plug-in or hybrid models. After an investigation by Fisker engineers, witnessed by NHTSA representatives, the company said that the origin of the fire was "residual salt damage inside a Vehicle Control Unit submerged in seawater for several hours. Corrosion from the salt caused a short circuit in the unit, which led to a fire when the Karma's 12-Volt battery fed power into the circuit". The company explained that Sandy's heavy winds spread that fire to other Karmas parked nearby, and also ruled out the vehicles' lithium-ion battery packs as a cause of, or even a contributing factor to, the blaze. Fisker reported a loss of around 330 additional Karmas when an entire shipment from Europe was flooded in the port terminal, the estimated value of the flood loss is in excess of US$30 million.

=== Tesla lawsuit ===
On April 14, 2008, Tesla Motors filed a lawsuit against Fisker Automotive, alleging that Henrik Fisker stole Tesla's Model S hybrid technology and was using it to develop the Karma. Tesla's suit claimed that the design work done for the Model S sedan by Fisker Coachbuild was substandard, and that Fisker Automotive diverted its best ideas to the Karma. On November 4, 2008 CNET News reported that Tesla Motors would discontinue its suit after an interim ruling in favor of Fisker et al. A news release on the Fisker Automotive website stated that Tesla was ordered to pay US$1,144,285 in costs.

== Related models ==
=== Karma Revero ===
The Karma Revero is the revamped, and updated version of the Fisker Karma, from Wanxiang's Karma Automotive, the rebranded successor to Fisker Automotive.

=== VLF Destino ===
The VLF Destino is a prototype internal combustion engine car based on the Fisker Karma, from VLF Automotive, proposed for production.

== Awards and recognition ==
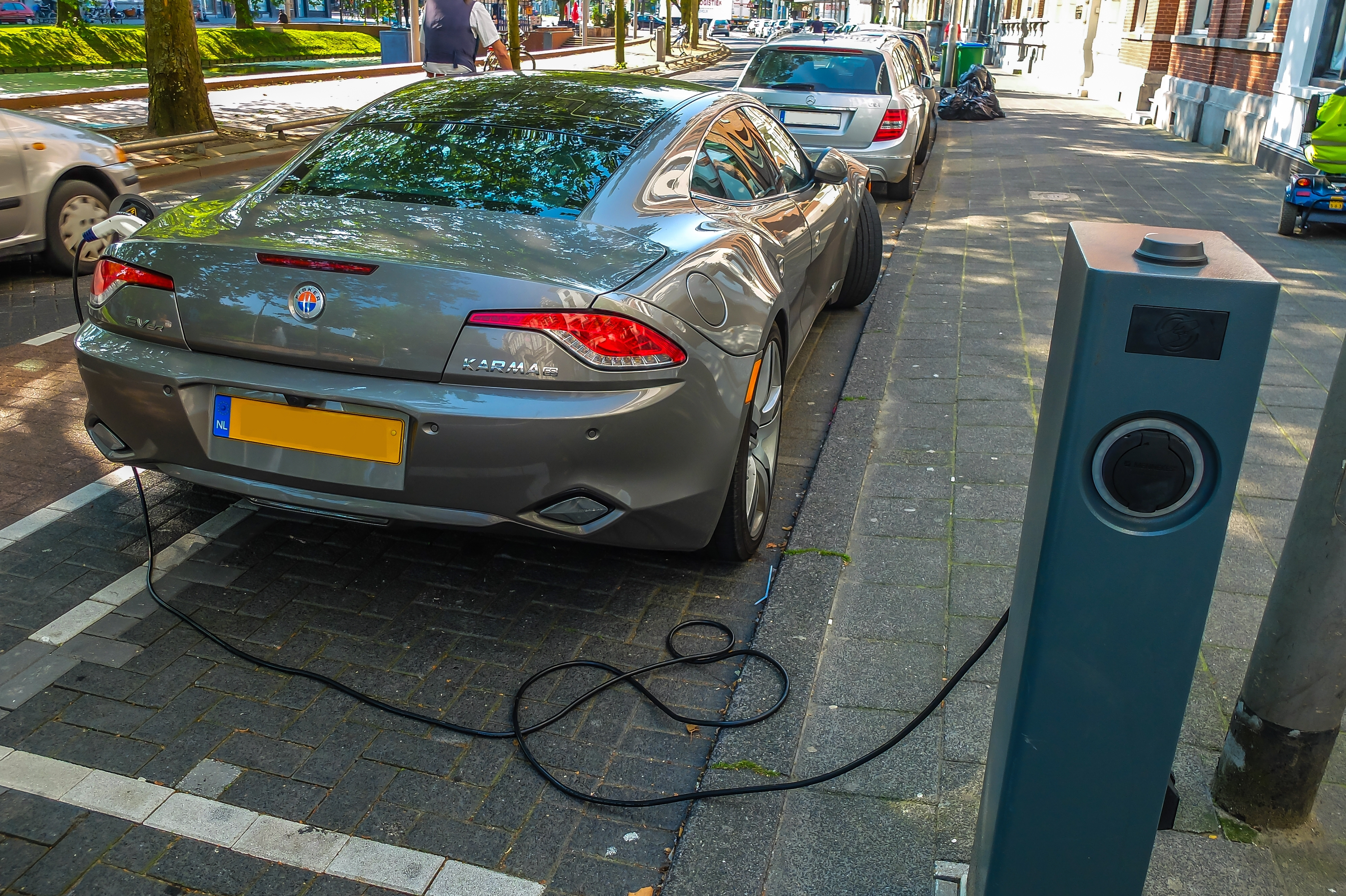
Fisker Karma charging in Rotterdam, 2013

2009 marked the first time that an electric vehicle was named a North American Production Preview Vehicle of the Year by the North American Concept Vehicle of the Year Awards. The award went to Fisker Automotive for the Fisker Karma Sunset.

The Fisker Karma was listed among the "Green Design 100" of 2009 by Time magazine. Also, Time listed the Karma among "The 50 Best Inventions" of 2011. In November 2011 the Fisker Karma won Automobile Magazine's 2012 Design of the Year Award.

In December 2011, Karma was chosen as "Luxury Car of The Year" by Top Gear Magazine, and "Car of The Year" by James May of TopGear.

In 2012, the German car magazine Auto Bild awarded the Fisker the "Golden Steering Wheel Award" as "Classic Car of the Future.

== In popular culture ==
Producers of the TV show Two and a Half Men chose the Karma as the vehicle for the character Walden Schmidt, a young and successful tech entrepreneur. The car was chosen to represent both Schmidt's wealth as well as his eccentricity.

== See also ==
- Fisker Atlantic
- Government incentives for plug-in electric vehicles
- List of modern production plug-in electric vehicles
- Plug-in electric vehicle
