= KillaCycle =

Electrically powered motorcycle

The KillaCycle is an electrically powered motorcycle purpose-built for drag racing. It was built and is managed by a small motorworks team owned and run by Bill Dubé. For ten years until December 2010 it was the fastest electric motorcycle in the world.

== Technical specifications ==
- Weight: 281 kilograms (619 lb)
- Battery pack: Lithium iron phosphate battery pack, made of 990 A123 Systems M1 cells, combined voltage of 374 V, weighing 79.4 kg. Energy content 27 megajoules (the energy of 572 ml of gasoline), rechargeable in 10 minutes.
- Motors: Two Model L-91 6.7-inch DC motors, 2,000 ampere each, switchable between series and parallel connection, giving 2,000 foot-pounds of torque on the back wheel.

== Performance figures ==
- Power: 260 kilowatts (350 horsepower)
- 0–60 mph: 0.97 seconds, which is more than 2.5 times the acceleration of Earth's gravity.
- ¼ mile: 7.89 seconds @ 270.36 km/h (167.99 mph)
- Top speed: 274 km/h (170 mph)
- The bike uses 2.12 megajoules (0.59 kWh), or roughly 7 U.S. cents' worth of electricity on a run down a quarter-mile drag strip, which is the same amount of energy stored in 65 ml of gasoline.
