= Thomas W. LaSorda =

Canadian-American automobile executive (born 1954)

Thomas William LaSorda (born July 24, 1954 in Windsor, Ontario) is a Canadian-American automobile industry executive who was CEO and President of the Chrysler Group. In December 2011, he joined the board of Fisker Automotive and assumed the role of CEO until his resignation in August 2012.

== Personal life ==
Tom LaSorda is the third generation of his family to work for Chrysler, being the son of a CAW union local president. He graduated from the University of Windsor in 1977 with a dual degree (Bachelor of Arts and a Bachelor of Commerce), and earned an MBA in 1980. He is married with two daughters, and lives in Birmingham, Michigan.

== Career ==
In 1977, he joined General Motors, working chiefly in manufacturing. He helped to launch the GM-Suzuki joint venture plant, CAMI Automotive, in Ingersoll, Ontario, and he also was president of Opel's Eisenach plant in eastern Germany.

=== Chrysler ===
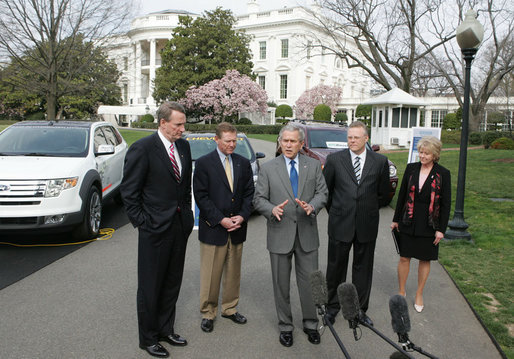
LaSorda with President George W. Bush, Rick Wagoner, Alan Mulally, and Mary Peters in 2007

In 2000, he joined the Chrysler Group as a senior vice president. He was first appointed to the board of Daimler in 2004 when he became chief operating officer. He was the architect of Chrysler's Toledo Supplier Park in Ohio, which integrated suppliers in a close relationship with Chrysler to produce the Jeep Wrangler.

On January 1, 2006, LaSorda succeeded Dieter Zetsche, a German from the parent company DaimlerChrysler (now Daimler AG), as Chrysler's CEO, as Zetsche was promoted to chief executive of DaimlerChrysler Group as a reward for the turnaround of Chrysler. That same year, LaSorda became a U.S. citizen, while retaining his Canadian citizenship.

On August 5, 2007, the demerger of Daimler and Chrysler occurred, with the latter being 80% purchased by Cerberus Capital Management. In the resulting management shuffle, LaSorda agreed to assume the position as president and vice chairman of Chrysler LLC, with Bob Nardelli succeeding him as chairman and chief executive officer. Despite the appointment of a second vice chairman, Jim Press, LaSorda stayed on.

His titles at Chrysler LLC officially stated that he was in charge of manufacturing, procurement, and supply, employee relations, global business development, and alliances since August 2007. Despite his expertise in manufacturing, however, LaSorda's new role in the company was largely to find a new partner or buyer for Chrysler, leading to speculation that Cerberus Capital was less interested in rebuilding the auto manufacturer than it was to turning profit though a leveraged buyout.

Of the many auto companies that LaSorda contacted, only Fiat agreed to a partnership. LaSorda counts the late Fiat/Chrysler CEO Sergio Marchionne, also Canadian-raised and -educated, as a close friend.

While Fiat asked LaSorda to stay on, he instead opted to step down as president and vice chairman and retired effective May 1, 2009, as Chrysler LLC filed for bankruptcy. LaSorda and Manoj Bhargava launched Stage 2 Innovations in May 2011. Chris Brower, Kevin O'Connell, and Rick Manner were later named Managing Directors of the Fund. Stage 2 Innovations is a venture capital firm located in Farmington Hills, Michigan.
