= A123 Systems =

Electrochemical battery company

A123 Systems, LLC.
- Type: Private
- Traded as: Nasdaq: AONE
- Founded: 2001; 25 years ago
- Founder: Yet-Ming Chiang, Bart Riley and Ric Fulop
- Headquarters: Hangzhou, Zhejiang, China
- Products: Electric vehicle batteries, batteries for various commercial products
- Number of employees: 2000+
- Parent: Wanxiang Group
- Website: www.a123systems.com

A123 Systems, LLC is a developer and manufacturer of lithium iron phosphate batteries and energy storage systems. It is a subsidiary of the Chinese Wanxiang Group Holdings.

The company was founded in 2001 by Yet-Ming Chiang, Bart Riley, and Ric Fulop. By 2009, it had about 2,500 employees globally and was headquartered in Waltham, Massachusetts. Its original product technology was based upon materials initially developed at the Massachusetts Institute of Technology.

== History ==
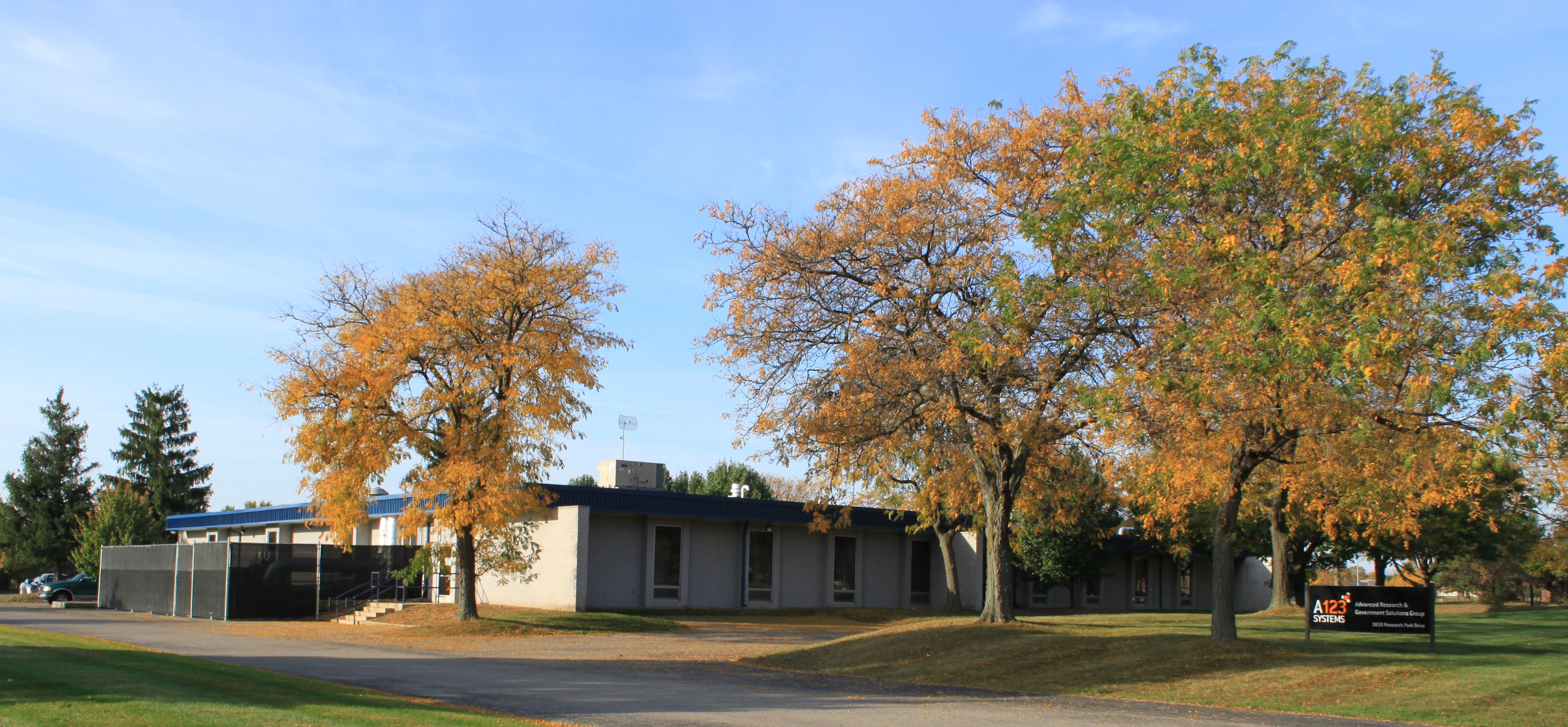
Advanced Research and Government Solutions Group, Ann Arbor, Michigan

In November 2005, the company announced a new, faster-recharging lithium-ion battery system based on doped nanophosphate materials licensed from the Massachusetts Institute of Technology.

In December 2006, the United States Advanced Battery Consortium (USABC) in collaboration with the U.S. Department of Energy (DOE) awarded the company a US$15 million development contract to optimize A123 Systems' proprietary doped nano-phosphate battery technology for hybrid electric vehicle applications with a focus on power, abuse tolerance, durability and cost. USABC is an organization composed of Chrysler LLC, Ford Motor Company, and General Motors Corporation.

BAE Systems announced that, from 2008, it would offer A123 Systems' lithium-ion battery technology as part of its HybriDrive Propulsion System used in the 2008 version of the Daimler Orion VII hybrid electric buses. As of September 7, 2009, more than 3,000 of the buses were in service.

In May 2008, the United States Advanced Battery Consortium (USABC) in collaboration with the U.S. Department of Energy (DOE) awarded the company a US$12.5 million grant to develop its lithium-ion battery technology for plug-in hybrid electric vehicles.

On March 5, 2008, General Electric, A123, and Think Global announced that the three firms had entered a partnership to enable global electrification of transportation. GE invested US$20 million in the company to help it roll out batteries for Think. The company and Think at the same time signed a commercial supply agreement. The partnership was announced at the 78th annual international Motor Show in Geneva. After over $10 million in investment in the Think Global Think City, A123 ceased production of its L20 battery pack for Think after a single day of production in December 2008.

In January 2009, A123 systems applied to the U.S. Department of Energy's Advanced Technology Vehicles Manufacturing Loan Program (ATVMLP) for US$1.84 billion in direct loans to support the construction of new lithium-ion battery manufacturing facilities in the United States, locating the first plant in southeast Michigan near Detroit. The application was still pending as of early 2012, the company estimated that it might be allowed to borrow up to US$233 million from the program.

In April 2009, Chrysler Corp. announced a contract with A123 to supply batteries for their ENVI EV vehicles.

In August 2009, the company received a US$249 million grant from the U.S. Department of Energy's Advanced Technology Vehicles Manufacturing Loan Program (ATVMLP) to build production facilities in Romulus and Livonia, Mich. after it received a US$125 million in tax credits and incentives from the Michigan Economic Development Corporation in spring and a US$10 million grant from the state in fall 2008.

In September 2009, the company raised US$380 million after going public on the NASDAQ stock exchange.

In 2009, the company was included on the Guardian's "Global Cleantech 100" list. Later, A123 was selected to Technology Review Magazine's list of the 50 Most Innovative Companies 2011.

Chrysler's ENVI division was disbanded by Nov 2009.

In December 2009, the company formed a joint venture with Shanghai Automotive Industry Corporation (SAIC), the largest automaker in China. This was the first joint venture between a Chinese automaker and a non-Chinese battery supplier. The new venture is called Advanced Traction Battery Systems (ATBS).

In August 2010, A123's co-founder Professor Yet-Ming Chiang spun off a new company from A123 named 24M Technologies, which makes technology that combines concepts in current lithium-ion batteries with flow batteries, where tanks of liquid electrolytes combine to create an electric current.

In 2010, A123 received a US$249 million grant from the U.S. Department of Energy for building battery production facilities. Approximately $129 million of the grant was used to build a 550 MWh battery plant in Livonia and another in Romulus. An untapped $120 million grant was abandoned by A123 by May 2012.

From its founding in 2002 through 2011 A123 raised over $1B in private equity, public finance and government funding.

In September 2010, the company opened the largest lithium-ion battery manufacturing facility in North America in Livonia, Michigan. When fully operational, the factory is expected to be capable of producing battery packs for the equivalent of up to 30,000 electric cars per year.

In March 2011, the company received its third contract from the United States Advanced Battery Consortium (USABC) in collaboration with the U.S. Department of Energy (DOE): a US$8 million advanced battery development contract to continue developing its Nanophosphate® lithium ion battery systems to meet USABC's target application for a Power-Assist Hybrid Electric Vehicle (PAHEV) Low-Energy Energy Storage System (LEESS).

The company laid off 125 workers in December 2011 as forecasted demand for its batteries did not materialize. The company had 60 customers with a combined projected demand for the equivalent of 100,000 plug in hybrid battery packs and factory capacity for up to 30,000 such packs and facilities capable of expansion to meet the demand. Fisker projected 15,000 unit demand in its first production year but only ordered 1500. GM, SAIC, and BMW all fell significantly below projected demand as the EV market developed much slower than anticipated. Simultaneously the US government pulled back on loans to developing clients forcing a series of bankruptcies in the emerging marketplace. Fisker, A123's top client, had its Government loan pulled and it received only $196M of the originally committed $500M loan. A123 had to issue a battery recall for all batteries in a car developed by Fisker due to a product defect. A123 Systems had more than 3000 employees as of December 2012.

=== Investments ===
In 2010 the company invested in Fisker Automotive's Karma with Ace Investments and Kleiner, Perkins, Caufield & Byers.

The company formed a joint venture with SAIC Motor to manufacture its batteries in China in early 2010.

In February 2018, A123 announced an investment in Ionic Materials' solid-state battery technology. Ionic is developing a unique polymer electrolyte that claims new levels of safety and performance in advanced batteries.

=== Product recall ===
In early 2012, the company announced the replacement of defective battery packs and modules supplied to about five customers, including Fisker Automotive. The defect caused a Fisker Karma to shut down in a Consumer Reports test. It estimated the recall would cost about US$55 million. Fisker reduced its purchase order of batteries from the company to lower its inventory. Cylindrical cells made in China that are used by BMW and others were declared as not affected.

=== Wanxiang acquisition and bankruptcy ===
In August 2012, Chinese automotive components manufacturer Wanxiang Group agreed to invest up to $465 million to acquire as much as 80% of A123 Systems; but the acquisition was not completed before A123 filed for bankruptcy.

In early October 2012, the A123 Systems' stock was trading for 27 cents per share, down from a 52-week high of $4.44 per share about a year beforehand.

On October 16, 2012, A123 filed for bankruptcy protection under Chapter 11. The filing listed assets of $459.8 million and liabilities of $376 million. An earlier statement, released by A123 Systems in early October, said that it had entered an asset purchase agreement with Johnson Controls, a supplier to A123, for $125 million, with the stipulation that the company's bid must be approved by a US bankruptcy court and could be topped by a rival bidder. Johnson did not win the bankruptcy auction and withdrew its bid in early December. On January 28, 2013, Wanxiang America purchased the preponderance of A123's assets out of bankruptcy for $256.6M and created A123Systems, LLC. The government business was sold to US firm Navitas Systems for $2.25m.

=== Lithium Werks sale ===
In March 2018, the US battery manufacturer Lithium Werks announced it took over the Chinese factory of A123 Systems in Changzhou, plus the workforce and clients base in China, Europe and the United States. After the merger the Texas-based company owns factories in China and offices in the US, the Netherlands, Northern Ireland, the UK and Norway. Lithiumwerks continued the production of the 'nanophosphate' battery range, renaming the cells from 'A123' to 'Lithiumwerks' by the end of 2019.

Following the sale of their factory, A123 said it wanted to concentrate on the automobile market.

== Products ==
=== Transportation ===
Passenger vehicles

- Fisker Karma, a plug-in hybrid
- Taxis in Tokyo, Japan. Better Place is running a demonstration project with three electric taxis powered by A123 Systems batteries.
- The Roewe 750 hybrid, the Roewe 550 plug-in hybrid and a yet-to-be-announced Roewe-brand all-electric vehicle from Shanghai Automotive Industry Corporation (SAIC), the largest automaker in China
- Chevrolet Spark EV, a city electric car to be produced by General Motors and scheduled to be sold in low volumes at select U.S. (including California) and global markets beginning in 2013.
- In May 2011, A123 introduced a lithium-ion 12 V engine starter battery designed as a lighter-weight, longer-lasting and more environmentally friendly drop-in replacement for lead acid batteries. A123's Nanophosphate® Engine Start Battery was selected to R&D Magazine's 2011 R&D 100, which salutes the 100 most technologically significant products introduced into the marketplace over the past year.

Commercial truck, bus, and off-highway

- Navistar International EStar: Electric Vehicle (EV) delivery vehicle
- Daimler Buses North America (Orion VII). The number one selling hybrid electric bus in the world. Operating in New York, San Francisco, Toronto, Dallas and other major cities.
- Eaton: Plug-in hybrid Trouble Truck based on Ford F550
- Smith Electric Vehicles Newton, an all-electric zero-emission delivery truck
- ALTe, a maker of range-extended hybrid electric powertrain systems targeting the light-duty truck market

Racing

- 2009 McLaren Mercedes Formula 1 KERS race car
- Killacycle, formerly the world's quickest electric vehicle, capable of accelerating from 0–100 kilometres per hour (0–62 mph) in less than 1 second.
- Ohio State University's Buckeye Bullet, an electric landspeed racer powered by A123's batteries, broke the international electric vehicle speed record in August 2010, reaching 307.666 miles per hour (495 km/h).
- In May 2011, A123 signed an agreement with Mavizen, a leader in electric motorcycle racing technology, by which Mavizen will make A123's battery technology available for TTXGP racing and other two-wheel motorsports.
- An ultra-light electric vehicle powered by 880 A123 Li-PO4 batteries, Brigham Young University's Electric Blue Streamliner set a land speed record for the 'E1' vehicle class (cars less than 1,100 pounds (499 kg)), averaging 204.9 miles per hour (330 km/h) in two runs in September 2014.

=== Electric grid ===
- In November 2008, A123 entered into the electric grid market by delivering its first battery energy storage system to AES Corporation for use at several AES substations in Southern California.
- In November 2009, A123 announced the commercial operation of a 12MW operating reserve project at the AES Gener Los Andes substation in the Atacama Desert in Chile.
- In December 2010, AES Corporation secured a loan from the United States Department of Energy to fund a 20MW frequency regulation energy storage system using A123's battery technology at the AES Westover power plant in Johnson City, New York.
- In February 2011, A123 announced its second project in Chile with AES Gener—a 20MW operating reserve energy storage system to be installed at a new 500MW power plant in Northern Chile called Angamos.
- In July 2011, A123 announced a contract to supply a 500 kW advanced energy storage system to Dongfang Electric, the third largest manufacturer of wind turbines in China and the country's largest exporter of power equipment, as a demonstration project to help evaluate how advanced energy storage can address the challenges associated with the rapid growth of wind power in China, where only about 72% of the country's wind turbines are connected to the power grid, according to the China Power Union.
- In October 2011, AES Corporation unveiled a 32 MW energy storage systems featuring A123's battery technology at the Laurel Mountain Wind Farm in West Virginia to be used for renewable integration and frequency regulation. As of its commissioning date it was the largest lithium-ion battery energy storage system of its kind then in operation. This site was successfully commissioned in December 2011.
- In March 2014, Japan's NEC announced its purchase of A123's grid energy storage business for $100 million.

=== Small applications ===
Black & Decker and DeWalt power tool lines were early adopters of A123 cells.

=== Cells ===
A123 had LiFePO_{4} Cells in the form 18650, 26650 and Pouch Cells with 14 and 20 Ah. The company EVLithium reports that A123 has additional Pouch cells: A123 38AH NMC Lithium ion Pouch Battery and A123 LiFePO_{4} Battery 50AH

== See also ==
- Navistar
