= Karma Revero =

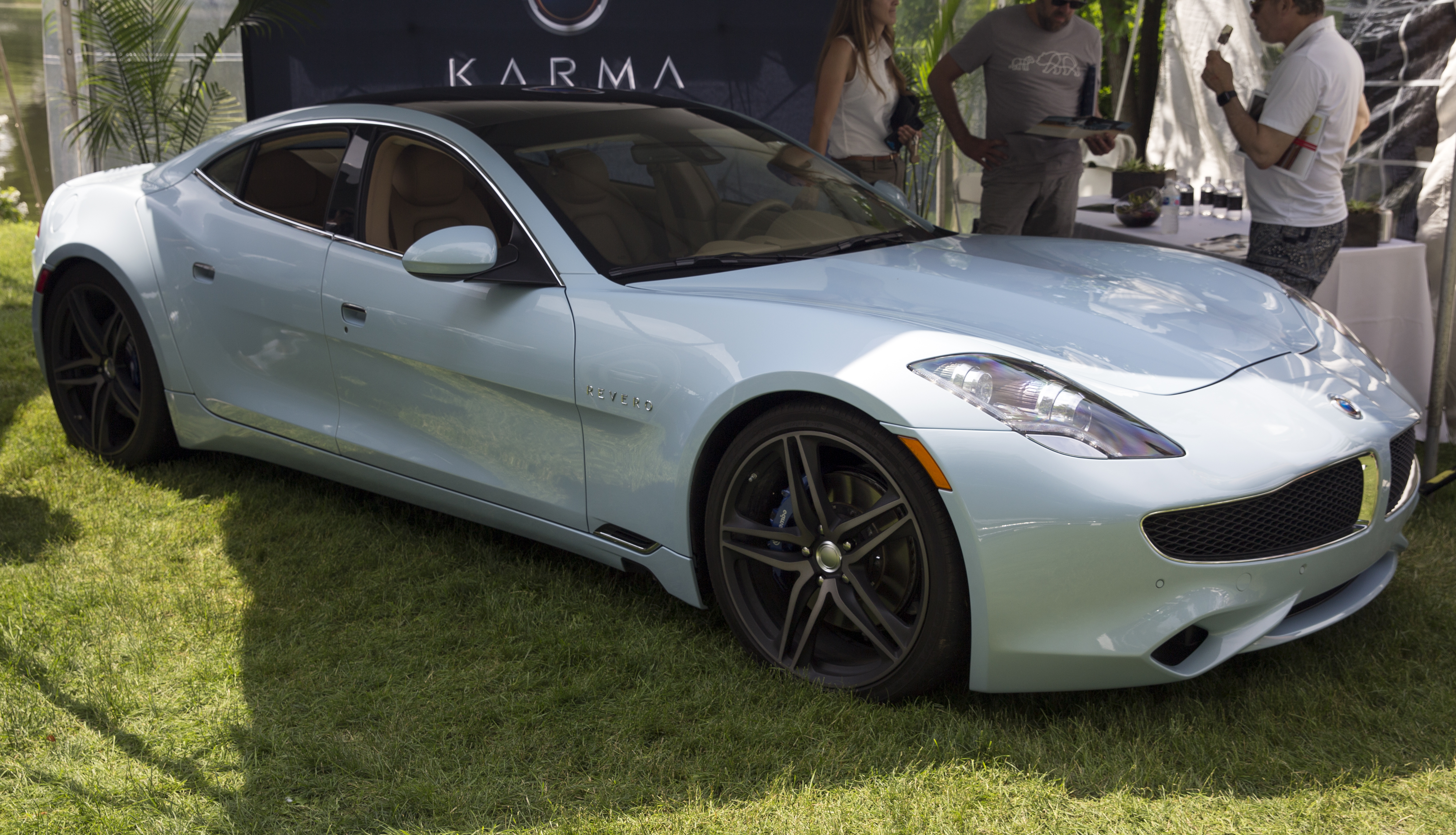
- Karma Revero at the 2018 Greenwich Concours d'Elégance

Overview
- Manufacturer: Karma Automotive
- Production: 2016–2019, 2025 (Revero); 2020 (Revero GT/GTS); 2021–2022 (GS-6)
- Model years: 2017–2022, 2025
- Assembly: United States: Moreno Valley, California (Karma Innovation & Customization Center (KICC)
- Designer: Henrik Fisker

Body and chassis
- Class: Hybrid executive sedan (E)
- Body style: 4-door saloon
- Layout: Front-engine + rear-motor, rear-wheel-drive (Revero); Front-engine + rear-motor, rear-wheel-drive (Revero GT/GTS/GS-6; 2020–present)
- Platform: GM E-Flex Platform
- Related: VLF Destino, Fisker Karma, Chevrolet Volt Concept

Powertrain
- Engine: 2.0 L GM Ecotec LNF Turbo I4 (EREV; 2017-2019); 1.5 L BMW TwinPower I3 turbocharged B38K15T0 (PHEV; 2020–present)
- Electric motor: 175 kilowatts (238 PS; 235 hp) 2x permanent-magnet synchronous AC motors
- Power output: 301 kilowatts (409 PS; 404 hp) (Revero EREV/GT); 400 kilowatts (540 PS; 540 hp) (Revero GTS)
- Transmission: 1-speed EVT
- Hybrid drivetrain: Series hybrid/PHEV
- Battery: 21.4 kWh (77 MJ) lithium-ion battery (Revero GT); 28 kWh (100 MJ) lithium-ion battery (Revero GTS/GS-6)
- Range: 298 mi (480 km) (Revero GT); 360 mi (580 km) (Revero GTS/GS-6)
- Electric range: 80 km

Dimensions
- Wheelbase: 3,159.8 mm (124.4 in)
- Length: 4,988.6 mm (196.4 in)
- Width: 2,133.6 mm (84 in)
- Height: 1,331.0 mm (52.4 in)
- Kerb weight: 2,452 kg

Chronology
- Predecessor: Fisker Karma
- Successor: Karma Gyesera Grand Coupe

The Karma Revero is a luxury plug-in hybrid sports sedan manufactured in the United States by Chinese-owned Karma Automotive. It is a revamped version of the Fisker Karma. The first of the new production, for model year 2017, was released in September 2016.

== Background ==
The Revero predecessor was introduced by Fisker Automotive as the Karma in 2012. It was the only model produced by Fisker before it went out of business in 2013. The tooling for the Fisker Karma was bought by Wanxiang in 2014. The tooling was moved from the factory in Finland to a new factory in Moreno Valley, California, USA. A total of 2,667 Fisker Karma were built before production was stopped. Karma's current headquarters reside in Irvine, California.

== History ==
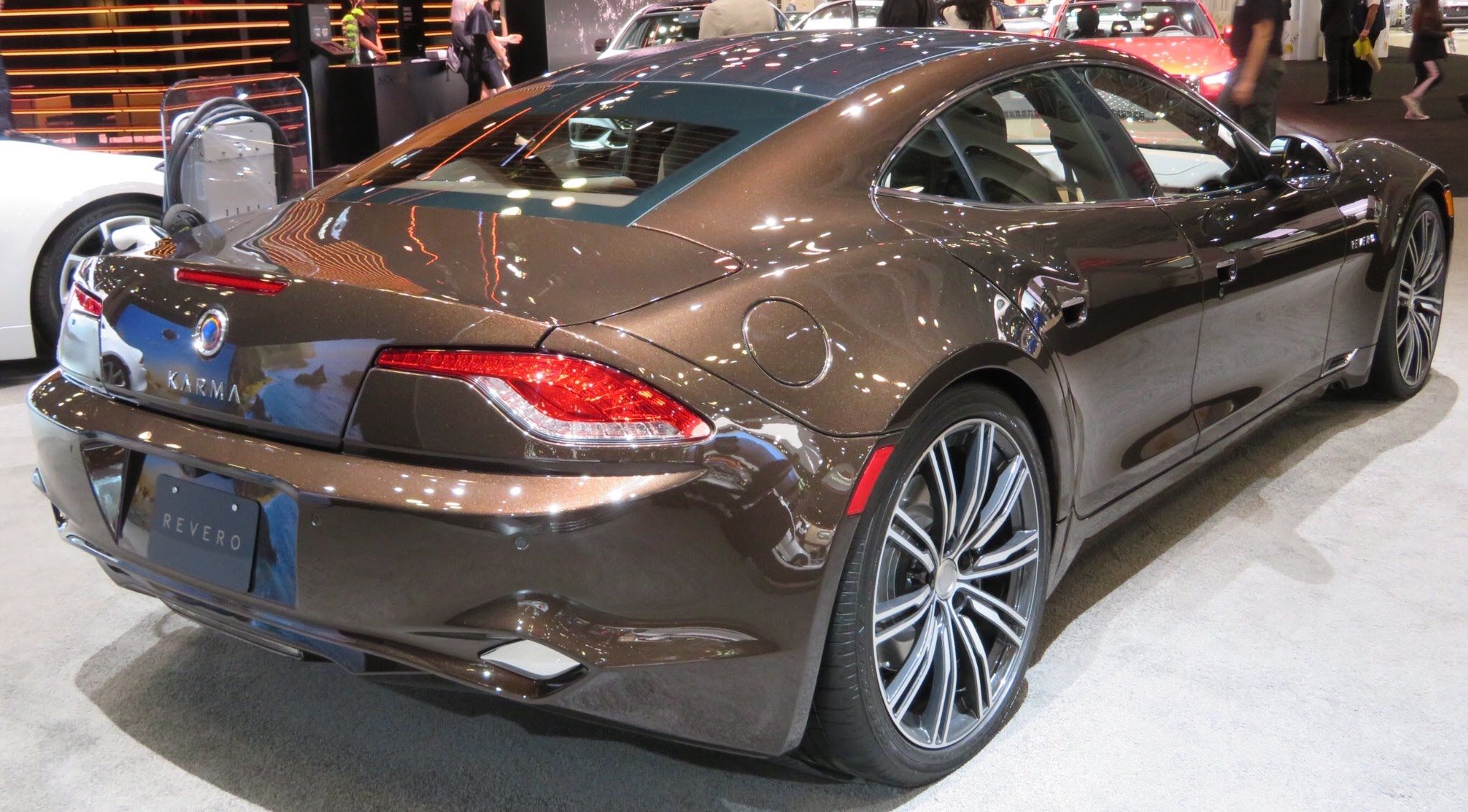
Karma Revero rear

The Fisker Karma was redesigned by Karma Automotive and reintroduced as the Karma Revero. The 2017 Revero was launched on September 8, 2016, at Laguna Beach. The exterior of the Karma Revero closely resembles the Fisker Karma, keeping the design produced by Henrik Fisker. The Karma Revero car also won 2018's Green Luxury Car of the Year award from Green Car Journal.

In 2018, Karma announced a limited production high-end package, the Karma Revero Aliso, named after the California beach, that adds $15,000 to the price of the car, resulting in a $145,000 starting price car, with a limited run of 15 units.

In 2019, an updated version, the Karma Revero GT, was revealed, using a three-cylinder 1.5 liter BMW engine as a range extender instead of the older model's drive motor GM engine. The new engine configuration launched in 2020, and it used to use the same B38 engine found in the BMW i8. Included in the changes is a larger battery.

== Revero GT/GS-6 ==
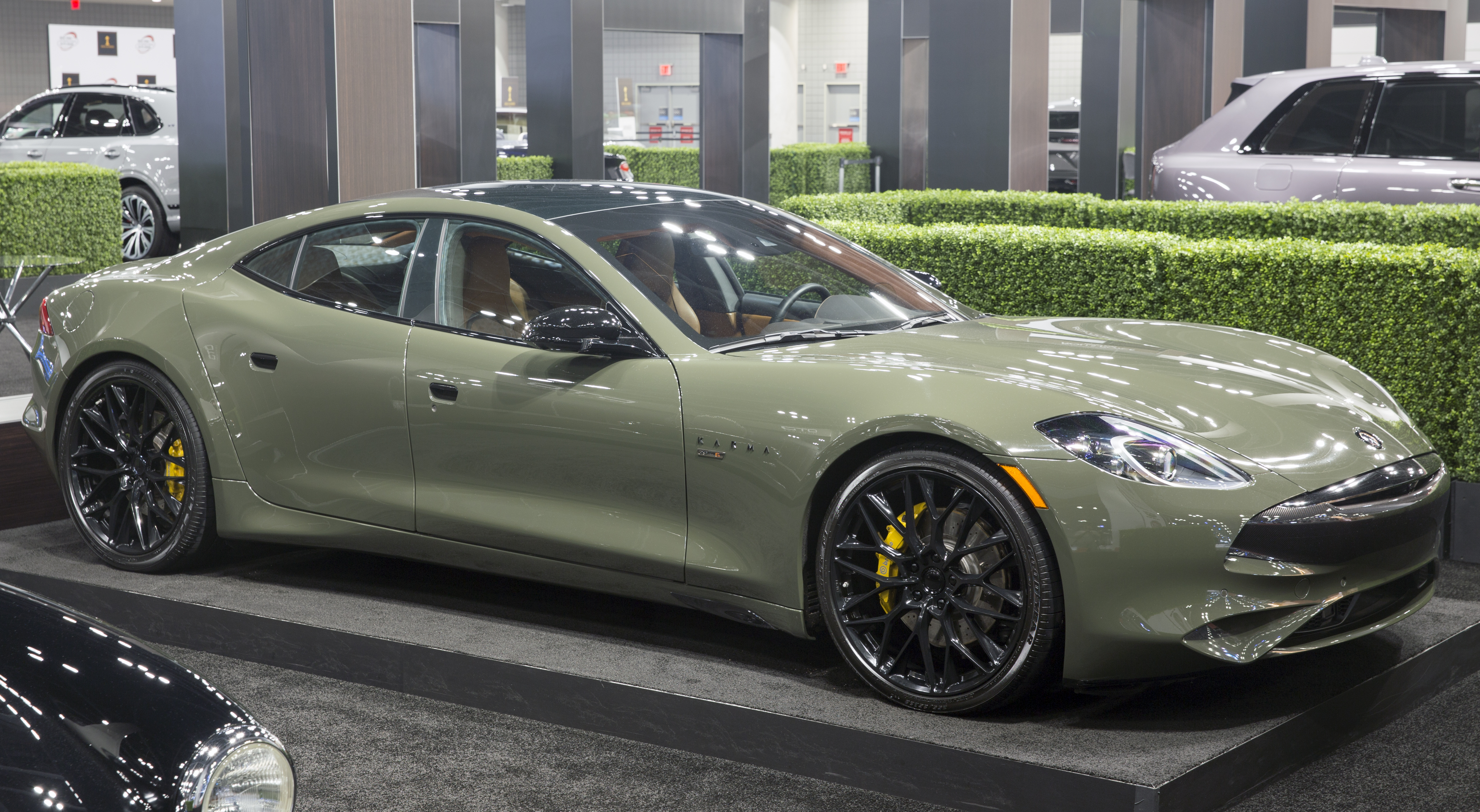
2022 Karma GS-6 at the New York International Auto Show

In 2021, Karma changed the name of the Revero GT to GS-6 (the name "Revero" would return for the 2025 model year). The 2020 Revero GT (and the renamed GS-6) is a refreshed and cheaper version of the Karma Revero plug-in hybrid (or a range-extended vehicle), with its base price in the US$90k+ range. In addition to swapping the GM engine for the BMW i8's, the battery capacity was increased from 21.4kWh to 28kWh as well as a revised front and rear facia with some minor changes to the interior. According to the manufacturer, the all-electric range is "up to" 80 mi (130 km), after which the vehicle smoothly switches to gasoline power.

After its return for the 2025 model year, it would later wrap up production in December 2025. A replacement was already in the cards as Karma announced in July 2025 that their model, the Karma Gyesera (unveiled in March 2024 at the Concours d’Elegance as a concept) would be replacing the Revero and would start by Q4 2025. The production model wasn’t revealed until August 2026 (being renamed to Gyesera Grand Coupe) as a 2027 model year. Deliveries are targeted to start in December 2026.

== Specifications ==
2018-2019 Revero

- US$130,000 base vehicle list price
- 260 horsepower (190 kW) four-cylinder turbocharged internal combustion engine
- 403 horsepower (301 kW) total power delivered to the rear-wheels
- 50 mi (80 km) all-electric range
- 300 mi (480 km) total range
- Solar photovoltaic panelled roof
- 21.4 kWh (77 MJ) lithium-ion battery
- 10-hour charge-time at 16 amps and 120 volts (North American home socket), 2-hour charge-time at 40amps and 240 volts
- 24 minutes to 80% charge at DC Fast Charge Station (CCS)
- 5.4-second 0–60 mph (0–97 km/h) acceleration time
- 125 mph (201 km/h) top speed
- 10.7" touchscreen infotainment car control center
- Digital dashboard
- Apple CarPlay
- Android Auto

2020-2025 Revero GT/GS-6/2025 Revero model

- US$135,000 base vehicle list price
- Three-cylinder BMW TwinPower turbocharged generator
- 536 horsepower (400 kW) total power from two electric motors on the rear axle
- 28 kWh (100 MJ) lithium-ion battery
- 4.5-second 0–60 mph (0–97 km/h) acceleration time
- 125 mph (201 km/h) top speed

== See also ==
- Karma Automotive
