= Wilmington Assembly =

Automobile factory in Wilmington, Delaware, US

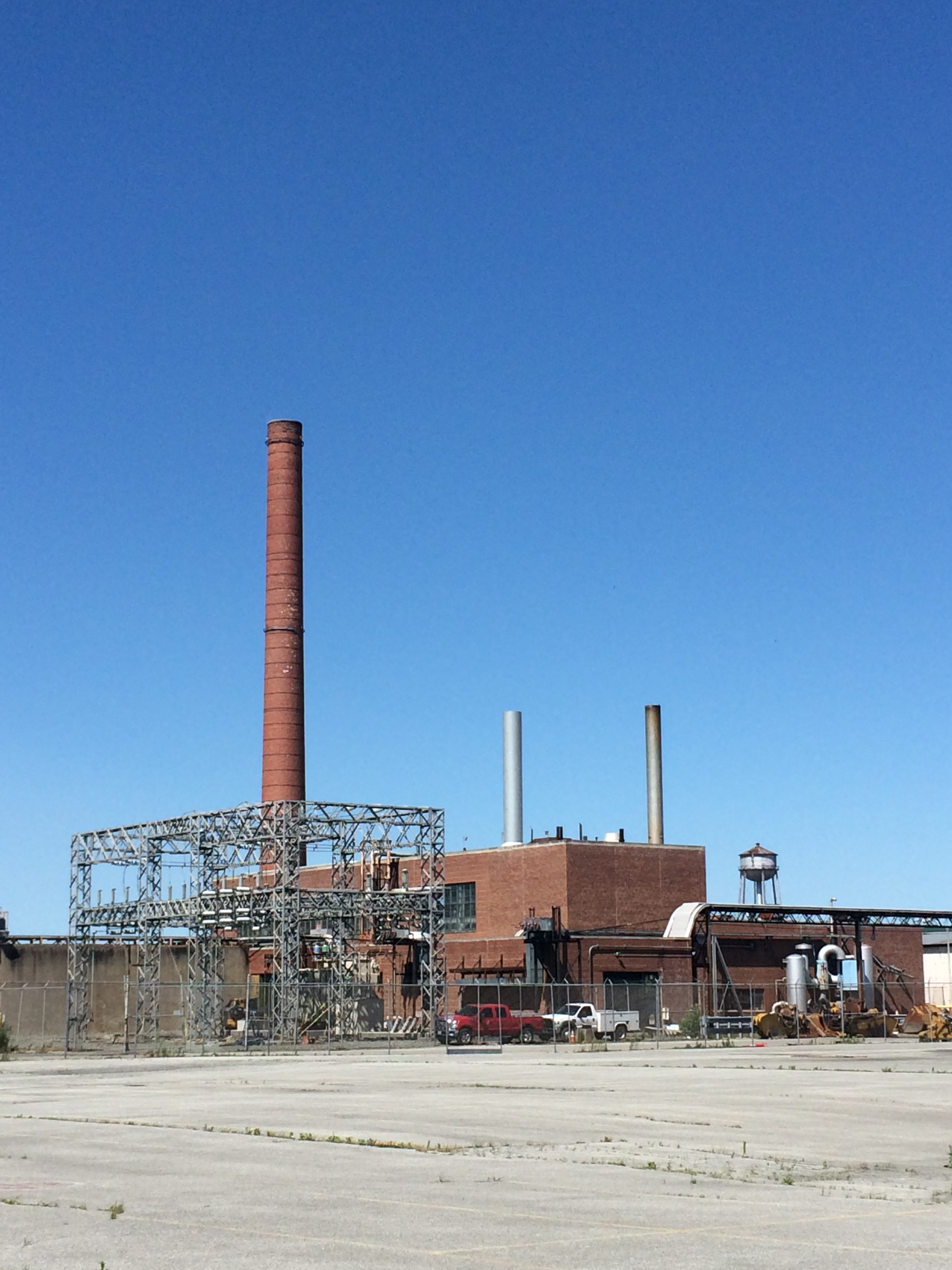
- The former Wilmington Assembly pictured in June 2019
- Operated: 1947–2009
- Location: 801 Boxwood Road, Wilmington DE 19804
- Coordinates: 39°43′42.97″N 75°36′41.26″W
- Industry: Automotive
- Products: Automobiles
- Area: 3,200,000-square-foot (300,000 m^{2})
- Owner: General Motors
- Defunct: 2009; 17 years ago

Wilmington Assembly was a General Motors automobile factory in Wilmington, Delaware. The 3,200,000-square-foot (300,000 m^{2}) factory opened in 1947, and produced cars for GM's Chevrolet, Pontiac, Oldsmobile, Buick, Saturn, Opel, and GM Daewoo brands during its operation. GM closed the plant on July 28, 2009.

== History ==
The plant was located at 801 Boxwood Road. It was under the management of GM's newly created Buick-Oldsmobile-Pontiac Assembly Division created in 1945, manufacturing cars for Buick, Oldsmobile, and Pontiac.

Some of the cars produced at the facility starting in the 1970s included (model years in parentheses):

- Chevrolet Chevette (1978-1985)
- Pontiac T1000/1000 (1981-1985)
- Pontiac Tempest (1987–1991)
- Chevrolet Corsica (1987–1996)
- Chevrolet Beretta (1987–1996)
- Chevrolet Malibu (1997–1999)
- Saturn L-Series (2000–2005)
- Pontiac Solstice (2006–2010)
- Saturn Sky (2007–2010)
- Opel GT (2007–2010)
- Daewoo G2X (2007–2009)

As part of the 2009 bankruptcy and restructuring of General Motors, Wilmington Assembly ceased automotive production on Tuesday, July 28, 2009. Its final product was a Pontiac Solstice convertible.

The closure of the Wilmington plant, for the time being, marks the end of large-scale automotive production in the Northeastern United States.

== Post-closure ==
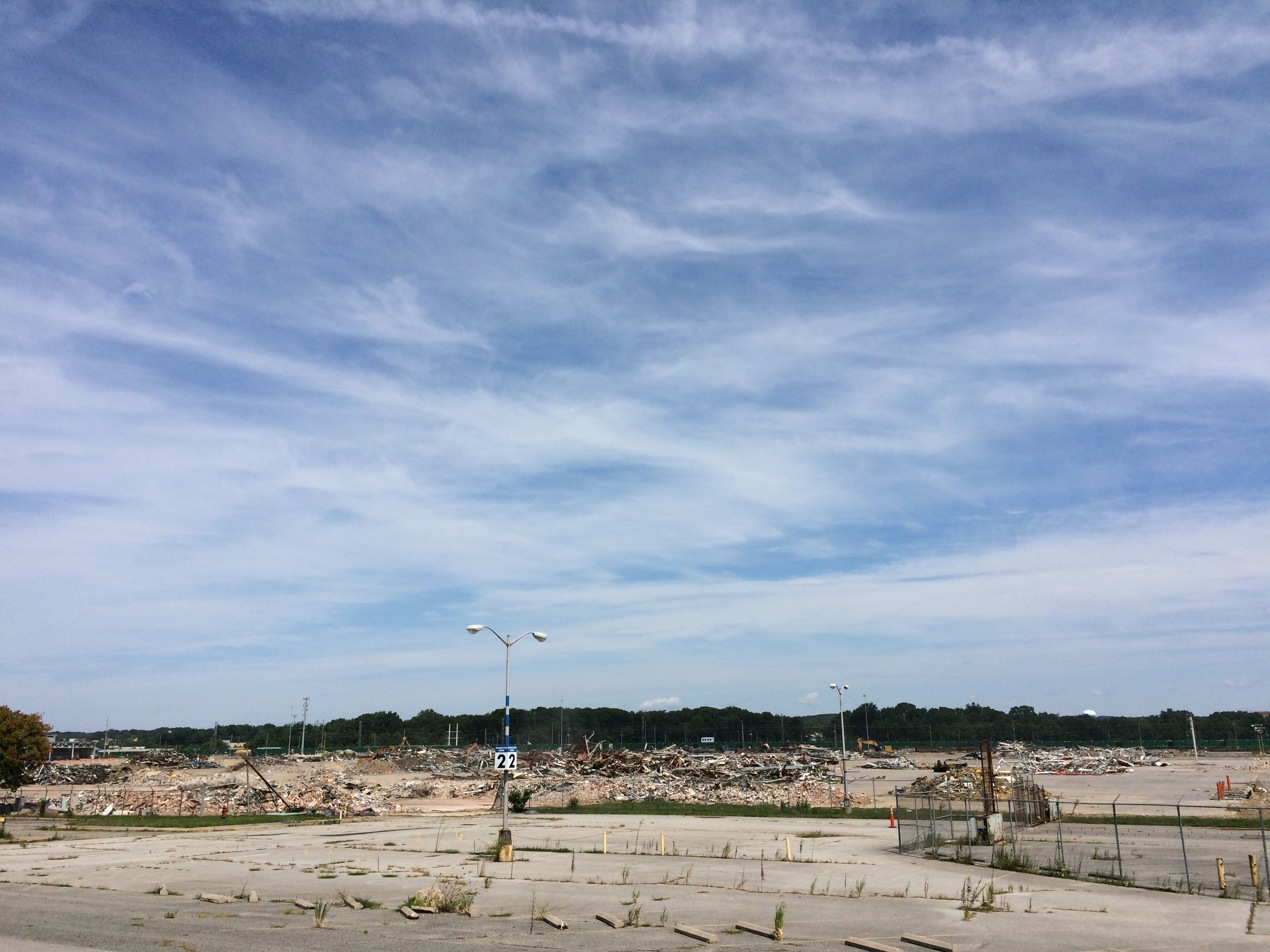
The former Wilmington Assembly following its 2019 demolition

Fisker Automotive had chosen the plant to launch its Project Nina, a plan to build plug-in hybrid sedans that cost less than $40,000 with a federal tax credit, according to the automaker. Then Vice President and former Delaware senator Joe Biden joined Fisker executives for the announcement at the plant.

Fisker said it would begin production on its vehicles by late 2012; Project Nina eventually created or supported 2,000 factory jobs and 3,000 vendor and supplier jobs. By 2014, it expected production to enter full swing, turning out 75,000–100,000 vehicles per year. It expected to export more than half of these vehicles, which would have been the largest export percentage of any domestic automaker.

The automaker would have spent $175 million to retool the GM plant with the funding coming from the $528.7 million Department of Energy loan awarded to Fisker in September.

Production was delayed to enter approximately 2014-2015 due to bankruptcy and financial constraints. Wanxiang acquired the plant in February 2014 after it purchased Fisker's assets in a bankruptcy auction. In October 2016, the plant was put up for sale. The site was purchased by Harvey, Hanna & Associates in 2017 and was completely demolished by end of 2019.

On May 19, 2020, Amazon announced it would build a fulfillment center on the site of the former Wilmington Assembly plant. The 3,700,000 sq ft (340,000 m^{2}) fulfillment center, which is Amazon's third in the state, opened in 2021.

== Buick-Oldsmobile-Pontiac Assembly Division (1945-1965) ==
Plants operating under Chevrolet Assembly management prior to General Motors Assembly Division management (most established pre-1945) were located at St. Louis, Missouri; Janesville, Wisconsin; Buffalo, New York; Norwood, Ohio; Flint (#2), Michigan; Oakland, California; Tarrytown, New York; Lakewood, Georgia; Leeds, Missouri; Baltimore, Maryland; Los Angeles (Van Nuys), California; Ypsilanti (Willow Run), Michigan; and Lordstown, Ohio. Framingham, Massachusetts is unusual in that it changed from B-O-P to Chevy management prior to becoming GMAD.

The terminology is confusing because most plants assembled more than just Chevrolet or B-O-P, and refers to the management structure only. The five brands originated vehicles from their respective "home" plants, where vehicles were assembled locally for their respective regions. Vehicles were also produced in "knock-down" kits and sent to the branch assembly locations. The "home" branches were Flint, Michigan for both Buick and Chevrolet; Oldsmobile at Lansing, Michigan; Pontiac at Pontiac, Michigan; and Cadillac at Detroit, Michigan.

- Arlington Assembly, Arlington, Texas
- Doraville Assembly, Atlanta, Georgia
- Fairfax Assembly, Kansas City, Kansas
- Framingham Assembly, Framingham, Massachusetts
- Fremont Assembly, Fremont, California
- Linden Assembly, Linden, New Jersey
- South Gate Assembly, South Gate, California
- Wilmington Assembly, Wilmington, Delaware
