= Teoyeo dialect =

Dialect of Teochew Min

- 潮陽話 (Tiô-iôⁿ-uē)
- Native to: China
- Region: Southern part of Shantou (former Teoyeo county)
- Language family: Sino-Tibetan: Sinitic; Chinese; Min; Coastal Min; Southern Min; Teochew; Teoyeo dialect
- Early forms: Proto-Sino-Tibetan: Old Chinese; Proto-Min
- Writing system: Chinese characters

Language codes
- ISO 639-3: –

Teoyeo dialect (simplified Chinese: 潮阳话; traditional Chinese: 潮陽話; Pe̍h-ōe-jī: Tiô-iôⁿ-uē) is a dialect of Teochew Min spoken in the historical Teoyeo county, which includes modern Chaoyang, Chaonan, and Haojiang in Shantou, Guangdong, China. Similar dialects are spoken in Huilai county and parts of Puning city.

== Distribution ==
Major dialect groups of Teochew Teoyeo and related Southern Teochew dialects

Teoyeo (潮阳县 / 潮陽縣, Mandarin Cháoyáng) was a historical county of the Teochew prefecture. The current administrative division introduced in 2003 has three units in place of this historical prefecture: Chaoyang (Teoyeo) District, Chaonan (Teonam) District, and Haojiang (Haukang) District. All of these divisions are now subordinate to the Shantou prefecture-level city.

The dialect spoken in the former Teoyeo county is very distinct from the urban Swatow and other Northern Teochew dialects, although they are still mutually intelligible to a large degree. Among the Northern Teochew dialects, Kekyeo dialect is relatively closer to Teoyeo. Teoyeo dialect is very similar to the dialects of Huilai and Puning, together classified as "Chaoyang-Puning branch" (潮普片) of the Teochew language.

In the northernmost areas of Chaoyang District (the Guanbu 關埠 and Jinzao 金灶 towns), a dialect similar to Northern Teochew is spoken. In the south of Chaonan District (the Leiling 雷岭 town) there is an isolated island of Hakka language.

== Phonology ==
=== Initials ===
		Bilabial	Alveolar	Velar	Glottal
Voiced	nasal	m 毛	n 年	ŋ 雅	
Voiced	plosive or lateral	b 米	l 來/內	ɡ 鵝/牙	
Voiceless stops	aspirated	pʰ 皮	tʰ 台	kʰ 可	
Voiceless stops	plain	p 比	t 都	k 歌	ʔ
Voiceless affricates	aspirated		tsʰ 菜/樹		
Voiceless affricates	plain		ts 書/指/食		
Fricatives			s 士/速		h 海/系
Fricatives			dz 爾/貳		h 海/系

The initial /dz/ may be realized as [z], especially when labialized.

In Teoyeo, labial initials (/p/, /pʰ/, /b/, /m/) have labiodental allophones ([pf], [pfʰ], [bv], [mv~ɱ]) before /-u-/.

Character	Pe̍h-ūe-jī	Peng'im	Teoyeo dialect	Swatow dialect
富	pù	bu^{3}	[pfu⁵²]	[pu²¹²]
搬	puaⁿ	buan^{1}	[pfũã³¹]	[pũã³³]
婆	phuâ	pua^{5}	[pfʰua²³]	[pʰua⁵⁵]
配	phuè	puê^{3}	[pfʰue⁵²]	[pʰue²¹²]
武	bú	bhu^{2}	[bvu⁴⁵]	[bu⁵²]
尾	bué	bhuê^{2}	[bvue⁴⁵]	[bue⁵²]
妹	muē	muê^{7}	[mvũẽ⁴³]	[mũẽ¹¹]
滿	muá	muan^{2}	[mvũã⁴⁵]	[mũã⁵²]

=== Rimes ===
Nucleus		-a-			-ɛ̝-		-o̞-		-i-	-u-	-ai-		-au-		-oi-	-ou-	-ui-	-iu-	∅-	
Medial		∅-	i-	u-	∅-	u-	∅-	i-	∅-	∅-	∅-	u-	∅-	i-	∅-	∅-	∅-	∅-	∅-	
Coda	-∅	a	ia	ua	e	ue	o	io	i	u	ai	uai	au	iau	oi	ou	ui	iu		
Coda	-◌̃	ã	ĩã	ũã	ẽ	ũẽ	õ	ĩõ	ĩ		ãĩ	ũãĩ	ãũ	ĩãũ	õĩ	õũ	ũĩ	ĩũ	m̩	ŋ̩
Coda	-ʔ	aʔ	iaʔ	uaʔ	eʔ	ueʔ	oʔ	ioʔ	iʔ	uʔ			auʔ	iauʔ	oiʔ			iuʔ		
Coda	-◌̃ʔ		ĩãʔ		ẽʔ				ĩʔ		ãĩʔ	ũãĩʔ	ãũʔ	ĩãũʔ	õĩʔ			ĩũʔ	m̩ʔ	ŋ̩ʔ
Coda	-m	am	iam	uam			om		im											
Coda	-ŋ	aŋ	iaŋ	uaŋ	eŋ	ueŋ	oŋ	ioŋ	iŋ	uŋ										
Coda	-p	ap	iap	uap			op		ip											
Coda	-k	ak	iak	uak	ek	uek	ok	iok	ik	uk										

Unlike northern dialects of Teochew, Teoyeo lacks the vowel /ɯ/ — it regularly merges with /u/ (e.g. Teoyeo 汝 lú and 豬 tu correspond to Northern Teochew 汝 lṳ́ and 豬 tṳ). The general Teochew rime /ɯŋ/ corresponds to Teoyeo rimes /iŋ/ (in literary readings, when derived from historical /ɯn/, e.g. 近 kĭng, 銀 ngîng) or /ŋ̩/ (in vernacular readings, e.g. 女 nńg, 堂 tn̂g, 村 tshng). For some modern speakers, the rime /ɯ/ may be reintroduced under the urban Swatow dialect influence, at least in some words.

The general Teochew rime /õũ/ is usually pronounced as /om/ in Teoyeo: 五 ngŏm, 虎 hóm. It is preserved only in a certain literary words, e.g. 奴 nôu, 否 hóuⁿ.

Rimes with both glottal stop and nasalization are chiefly used in a few ideophones and onomatopoeia.

=== Tones ===
Teoyeo dialect has seven tones instead of general Teochew eight tones. Generally, the 'light rising' tone (陽上) is merged with the 'dark departing' tone (陰去). In the Haimen dialect, this tone is instead merged with the 'dark level' tone (陰平).

The conservative Teoyeo accent in notable for having four falling tone out of its five non-checked tones. There is an ongoing tone shift in the Teoyeo dialect. This shift is more advanced in urban dialects in Eastern Chaoyang (incl. Haojiang, especially the Dahao dialect), among female speakers, and in the younger generations (born after the 1980s). The principal features of this shift are as follows:

- Dark level tone (①) shifts from 21 ˨˩ to 31 ˧˩.
- Light level tone (⑤) shifts from high level 44 ˦ to mid-level 33 ˧ or mid-rising 23 ˨˧.
- Dark rising tone (②) shifts from high falling 551 ˥˥˩ to high level 55 ˥, and in urban Eastern Teoyeo dialects it can even become high rising 45 ˦˥ or 35 ˧˥.
- Dark departing tone (③) and light departing tone (⑦) are falling in a "parallel" pattern (53 ˥˧ and 42 ˦˨ respectively) in the old accent, while in the new accent they are still falling, but the light departing tone (⑦) is more "flat" (52 ˥˨ and 43 ˦˧~44 ˦ respectively).

	citation tones				post-sandhi tones			
	平 level	上 rising	去 departing	入 entering	平 level	上 rising	去 departing	入 entering
Teoyeo (old)
陰 dark	① 21 ˨˩	② 551 ˥˥˩	③ 53 ˥˧	④ 43 ˦˧	33 ˧	53 ˥˧	33 ˧	5 ˥
陽 light	⑤ 44 ˦	⑥ =③	⑦ 42 ˦˨	⑧ 45 ˦˥	44 ˦	21 ˨˩		3 ˧
Teoyeo (new)
陰 dark	① 31 ˧˩	② 55 ˥˥ ~ 35 ˧˥	③ 52 ˥˨	④ 32 ˧˨	31 ˧˩	52 ˥˨	23 ˨˧	5 ˥
陽 light	⑤ 33 ˧ ~ 23 ˨˧	⑥ =③	⑦ 43 ˦˧ ~ 44 ˦	⑧ 45 ˦˥	33 ˧ ~ 23 ˨˧	21 ˨˩		3 ˧
Haimen
陰 dark	① 31 ˧˩	② 551 ˥˥˩	③ 51 ˥˩	④ 43 ˦˧	33 ˧	41 ˦˩	44 ˦	54 ˥˦
陽 light	⑤ 44 ˦	⑥ =①	⑦ 441 ˦˦˩	⑧ 45 ˦˥	44 ˦	33 ˧		43 ˦˧
Dahao
陰 dark	① 21 ˨˩	② 24 ˨˦	③ 52 ˥˨	④ 3 ˧	21 ˨˩	52 ˥˨	33 ˧	45 ˦˥
陽 light	⑤ 33 ˧	⑥ =③	⑦ 31 ˧˩	⑧ 45 ˦˥	33 ˧	21 ˨˩		3 ˧
Puning and Huilai
陰 dark	① 34 ˧˦	② 53 ˥˧ (Note: Puning, Western Huilai, older speakers in Central Huilai) or 55 ˥ (Note: Eastern Huilai, younger speakers in Central Huilai)	③ 31 ˧˩	④ 32 ˧˨	33 ˧	34 ˧˦	55 ˥	54 ˥˦
陽 light	⑤ 44 ˦	⑥ 23 ˨˧	⑦ 42 ˦˨ (Note: Puning, Eastern Huilai) or =③ (Note: Central Huilai) or =⑥ (Note: Western Huilai)	⑧ 54 ˥˦	31 ˧˩	33 ˧		32 ˧˨

== Literature ==
- 徐馥琼 (2022). 粤东闽语语音研究. 中国社会科学出版社. ISBN 978-7-5203-9835-0.
- Zhang, Jingfen (2021). Tono-types and Tone Evolution: The Case of Chaoshan. Springer Nature. ISBN 978-981-334-870-7.
- 陈晓爽 (2019). 潮阳方言近四十年语音演变研究 (Thesis). 北京外国语大学.
- 潘家懿 (2009). "粤东闽语存在齿唇音声母". 中国语文 (2009–1): 81–83.
- 潘家懿; 鄭守治 (2010). "粵東閩南語的分布及方言片的劃分". 臺灣語文研究. 5 (1): 145–165. doi:10.6710/JTLL.201003_5(1).0008.
- 吳芳 (2011). "廣東潮陽閩南方言的語音分區". 臺灣語文研究. 6 (2): 97–110. doi:10.6710/JTLL.201109_6(2).0006.
