= Teochew Min =

Southern Min language of China

Teochew
- Chaozhou, Chaoshan, Teo-Swa
- 潮州話 / 潮汕話 / 潮語
- Native to: China, overseas communities (particularly in Southeast Asia)
- Region: Eastern Guangdong (Chaoshan)
- Ethnicity: Teochew people
- Native speakers: About 14 million in Chaoshan (2004) more than 5 million overseas
- Language family: Sino-Tibetan: Sinitic; Chinese; Min; Coastal Min; Southern Min; Teochew
- Early forms: Proto-Sino-Tibetan: Old Chinese (Note: Min is believed to have split from Old Chinese, rather than Middle Chinese like other varieties of Chinese.); Proto-Min
- Dialects: Swatow dialect; Teoyeo dialect; Pontianak Teochew
- Writing system: Chinese characters Teochew Romanization; Peng'im

Language codes
- ISO 639-3: nan (as part of Southern Min)
- Glottolog: chao1238
- Linguasphere: 79-AAA-ji
- Teochew (Teo-Swa) within the Southern Min languages

Teochew Min
- Traditional Chinese: 潮州話
- Simplified Chinese: 潮州话
Transcriptions
Standard Mandarin
- Hanyu Pinyin: Cháozhōu huà
Wu
- Romanization: zau tseu ghae ho
Hakka
- Romanization: Tshèu-chû-fa
Yue: Cantonese
- Jyutping: Ciu4 zau1 waa2
Southern Min
- Hokkien POJ: Tiô-chiu-ōe / Tiô-chiu-ōa
- Teochew Peng'im: Diê⁵ ziu¹ uê⁷ / Dio⁵ ziu¹ uê⁷
Eastern Min
- Fuzhou BUC: Dièu-ciŭ-uâ

Teochew, (Note: Chinese: 潮州話, Teochew: Tiô-tsiu-uē (Pe̍h-ūe-jī) / Dio^{5}ziu^{1}uê^{7} (Peng'im), Mandarin: Cháozhōuhuà) also known as Swatow (Note: Chinese: 汕頭話, Teochew: Suaⁿ-thâu-uē (Pe̍h-ūe-jī) / Suan^{1}tao^{5}uê^{7} (Peng'im), Mandarin: Shàntóuhuà) or Teo-Swa (Note: Chinese: 潮汕話, Teochew: Tiô-suaⁿ-uē (Pe̍h-ūe-jī) / Dio^{5}suan^{1}uê^{7} (Peng'im), Mandarin: Cháoshànhuà) after its two best-known dialects, is a Southern Min language spoken by the Teochew people in the Chaoshan region of eastern Guangdong and by their diaspora around the world. It is sometimes referred to as Chiuchow, its Cantonese rendering, due to English romanization by colonial officials and explorers. It is closely related to Hokkien, with many similarities in lexicon, phonology, and syntax, but the two languages are not mutually intelligible.

Teochew preserves many Old Chinese pronunciations and vocabulary that have been lost in some of the other modern varieties of Chinese. As such, Teochew is described as one of the most conservative Chinese languages.

== History and geography ==
Historically, the Teochew (Note: Mandarin 'Chaozhou') prefecture included modern prefecture-level cities of Chaozhou, Jieyang and Shantou. In China, this region is now known as Teoswa. (Note: Mandarin 'Chaoshan') Parts of the Hakka-speaking Meizhou city, such as Dabu County and Fengshun, were also parts of the Teochew prefecture and contain pocket communities of Teochew speakers.

As the Teochew region was one of the major sources of Chinese emigration to Southeast Asia during the 18th to 20th centuries, a considerable Overseas Chinese community in that region is Teochew-speaking. In particular, the Teochew people settled in significant numbers in Thailand, Cambodia and Laos, where they form the largest Chinese sub-language group. Additionally, there are many Teochew-speakers among Chinese communities in Vietnam, Singapore, Malaysia (especially in the states of Johor, Malacca, Penang, Kedah and Selangor with significant minorities in Sarawak) and Indonesia (especially in West Kalimantan). Waves of migration from Teochew region to Hong Kong, especially after the communist victory of the Chinese Civil War in 1949, has also resulted in the formation of a community there, although most descendants now primarily speak Cantonese and English as a result of colonialism and assimilation to the dominant Cantonese culture.

Teochew speakers are also found among overseas Chinese communities in Japan and the Western world (notably in the United States, Canada, Australia, United Kingdom, France and Italy), a result of both direct emigration from the Chaoshan region to these nations and also secondary emigration from Southeast Asia.

In Singapore, Teochew remains the ancestral language of many Chinese Singaporeans, with Chinese of Teochew descent making up the second largest Chinese group in Singapore, after the Hoklo. Despite this, many Teochew people, particularly the younger generations, are shifting towards English and Mandarin as their main spoken language. This is due to the Singapore government's stringent bilingual policy that promotes English as the official language of education, government and commerce and promotes Mandarin at the expense of other Chinese languages. Some Teochew assimilated with the larger Hokkien community and speak Hokkien rather than Teochew due to Hokkien's prominent role as a lingua franca previously among the Singaporean Chinese community.

== Classification ==
Teochew is a Southern Min language. As with other Sinitic languages, it is not mutually intelligible with Mandarin, Cantonese or Shanghainese. It has only limited intelligibility with Hokkien. Even within the Teochew dialects, there is substantial variation in phonology between different regions and between different Teochew communities overseas.

The dialects of Teochew Min include:

- Northern Teochew, or Chaozhou division (潮州片), including:
  - Chaozhou / Teochew dialect (潮州话 / 潮州話), spoken in urban Chaozhou (Xiangqiao District); a similar dialect is spoken in Chenghai
  - Jieyang / Kekyeo dialect (揭阳话 / 揭陽話), spoken in urban Jieyang (Rongcheng District); related dialects are spoken in adjacent areas in Jiedong, Jiexi, as well as in northern parts of Puning and Chaoyang
  - Shantou / Swatow dialect (汕头话 / 汕頭話), spoken in urban Shantou (Jinping and Longhu)
  - Raoping dialect (饶平话 / 饒平話), spoken in Raoping County
- Southern Teochew, or Chaoyang-Puning division (潮普片), including:
  - Chaoyang / Teoyeo dialect (潮阳话 / 潮陽話), spoken in the historical Teoyeo (Chaoyang) county, which includes modern Chaoyang, Chaonan, and Haojiang
  - Puning dialect (普宁话 / 普寧話), spoken in urban Puning
  - Huilai dialect (惠来话 / 惠來話), spoken in Huilai County

The Language Atlas of China considers the Hai Lok Hong dialect a part of Chaoshan Min (as a third branch), while others consider it a part of Hokkien or an independent Southern Min variety.

On Nan'ao island, there are two dialects, both distinct from mainland Teochew, with Western Nan'ao dialect inclining towards Northern Teochew, and Eastern Nan'ao dialect showing Hokkien influence, as this part of the island was included in Zhangzhou prefecture in 16—19 centuries.

Chawan dialect, spoken in Fujian along the Guangdong border, is quite different from other southern dialects of Hokkien. It has some lexical influence from Teochew and relatively higher mutual intelligibility with it, yet in other aspects it clusters more with Hokkien than Teochew.

The main criterion in the classification of Teochew dialects is the presence or absence of the vowel /ɯ/. It is found in Northern Teochew in words like hṳ̂ 魚 he^{5} "fish" and sṳ̄ 事 se^{7} "thing; matter". Southern Teochew has /u/ instead (hû 魚 hu^{5}, sū 事 su^{7}). Hai Lok Hong and Eastern Namoa dialects have /i/ or /u/ instead, depending on the etymology of the word (hî 魚 hi^{5}, but sū 事 su^{7}), similarly to Zhangzhou Hokkien. Southern Teochew may be further divided into Huilai—Puning dialects and Chaoyang dialects, based on their tone contours.

Location of the historical Teochew prefecture (潮州府) in Guangdong province during the Qing dynasty. Teochew is spoken throughout the region, which is now called "Teoswa", as the former Teochew prefecture was dissolved.

Major dialect groups of Teochew
Northern Teochew
Southern Teochew
Hai Lok Hong Min (sometimes included in Teochew)
Hokkien-Teochew transitional dialects
Ciangciu Hokkien

The prestige dialects of Teochew all belong to the Northern branch. The Northern Teochew dialects are mutually intelligible with each other, but less so with the Southern branch.

Various stereotypes and cultural traits are associated with different Teochew dialects. For instance, within Shantou city, the urban Swatow dialect is perceived as "energetic" and "gentle", but also "snobbish" and "pretentious" by speakers of other dialects; the Chenghai dialect (similar to urban Chaozhou dialect) is perceived as "soft", "cute", and "high-pitched"; the Chaoyang dialect is perceived as "harsh", "aggressive", and "countrified".

== Writing system ==
Written Southern Min is known since at least the 16th century. The earliest known work is a 1566 edition of the Tale of the Lychee Mirror, a folk drama written in a mixture of Teochew and Chinchew Hokkien.

Teochew writing is neither standardized nor is widely used. In Imperial China, most writing was conducted in Classical Chinese, while vernacular writing was only used in novels, songbooks and opera scripts. After the Xinhai revolution, only written Mandarin was supported by the government, while speakers of other Sinitic languages, including Teochew, remaining largely illiterate in their own tongues.

Teochew rime dictionaries appeared relatively late, the earliest of them being "Fifteen consonants of Teochew sound" (潮聲十五音, 1913) by Zhang Shizhen (張世珍), "Ji Mu Zhi Yin"(擊木知音, 1915) by Jiangxia Maotingshi (江夏懋亭氏) and "Fifteen consonants of Teochew language" (潮語十五音, 1921) by Jiang Rulin (蔣儒林).

=== Chinese characters ===
Most of the Teochew vocabulary can be traced back to Old Chinese, and thus can be written using Chinese characters. There are different ways to write words that do not have a clearly associated etymological character, including:

- using a character with the same meaning regardless of its reading
- borrowing a phonetically close character regardless of its meaning
- inventing a new character
- attempting to find an original character

Teochew shares characters with Hokkien for cognate words, but it is also influenced by the Cantonese written tradition.

Word	Possible spellings			
Word	Semantic	Phonetic	Invented character	Presumed original character
pak / bag^{4} "to know"	識	捌, 八	𧧸	別
tiâng / diang^{5} "who"	誰	珍, 唺	𫢗	[底儂]
tsōi / zoi^{7} "many"	多	諸, 眾	侈	濟, 㩼
thâi / tai^{5} "to kill"	殺	汰	刣	治
m̆ / m^{6} "not"	不	唔	伓	毋
tse̍k / zêg^{8} "one"	一	澤		蜀, 隻
kûiⁿ / guin^{5} "tall; high"	高	危		懸
tshâng / cang^{5} "field"	田			塍, 層

=== Romanization ===
There are two principal romanization systems for Teochew:

- Pe̍h-ūe-jī, originally invented for Hokkien in the 19th century and adapted for Teochew (particularly the Swatow dialect)
- Peng'im, invented in the 1960s and based on the Hanyu Pinyin romanization for Mandarin

While Peng'im has some presence in academic works published in PRC, many publications on Teochew use their custom IPA-based romanizations.

Consonants
IPA	Pe̍h-ūe-jī	Peng'im
/p/	p	b
/pʰ/	ph	p
/b/	b	bh
/m/	m	m
/t/	t	d
/tʰ/	th	t
/l/	l	l
/n/	n	n
/h/	h	h
/k/	k	g
/kʰ/	kh	k
/g/	g	gh
/ŋ/	ng	ng
/ts/	ts (Note: Many missionary publications use ch, chh and j before i. ts, tsh and z are used elsewhere, like some versions of Hokkien Pe̍h-ōe-jī.)	z
/tsʰ/	tsh	c
/dz/	z	r
/s/	s	s

Vowels
IPA	Pe̍h-ūe-jī	Peng'im
/a/	a	a
/ia/	ia	ia
/ua/	ua	ua
/ai/	ai	ai
/au/	au	ao
/uai/	uai	uai
/iau/	iau	iao
/o/	o	o
/io/	io	io
/oi/	oi	oi
/ou/	ou	ou
/iou/	iou	iou
/e/ or /ɛ/	e	ê
/ie/ or /iɛ/	ie	iê
/ue/ or /uɛ/	ue	uê
/ɯ/ or /ə/	ṳ	e
/i/	i	i
/u/	u	u
/ui/	ui	ui
/iu/	iu	iu

Codas
IPA	Pe̍h-ūe-jī	Peng'im
/-ŋ/	-ng	-ng
/-k/	-k	-g
/-ʔ/	-h	-h
/-◌̃/	-ⁿ	-n
/-m/	-m	-m
/-p/	-p	-b
/-n/ (Note: Obsolete in most Teochew dialects.)	-n	—
/-t/	-t	—

== Phonetics and phonology ==
=== Consonants ===
Prenasalization of voiced plosives and lateral in Teochew
Voicelessly prenasalized voiced stops and lateral

買 鵝 來 食
bói gô lāi tsia̍h
bhoi2 gho5 lai7 ziah8
[ᵐ̥boi ᵑ̥ɡo ⁿ̥ɺai tsiaʔ]
"buy geese to eat"

Teochew, like other Southern Min varieties, is one of the few modern Sinitic languages which have voiced obstruents (stops, fricatives and affricates); however, unlike Wu and Xiang Chinese, the Teochew voiced stops and fricatives did not evolve from Middle Chinese voiced obstruents, but from nasals.

The voiced stops [b] and [ɡ] and also [l] are voicelessly prenasalized [ᵐ̥b], [ᵑ̥ɡ], [ⁿ̥ɺ], respectively.

The voiced affricate dz, initial in such words as jī 字 ri^{7} (/dzi˩/), jĭ 二 ri^{6} (/dzi˧˥/), jiâng 然 riang^{5} (/dziaŋ˥/), jia̍k 若 riag^{8} (/dziak˦/) loses its affricate property with some younger speakers abroad, and is relaxed to [z].

Teochew consonants
		Bilabial	Alveolar	Velar	Glottal
Voiced (no frictions)	nasal	m 毛	n 年	ŋ 雅	
Voiced (no frictions)	plosive or lateral	b 米	l 來/內	ɡ 鵝/牙	
Voiceless stops	aspirated	pʰ 皮	tʰ 台	kʰ 可	
Voiceless stops	plain	p 比	t 都	k 歌	ʔ
Voiceless affricates	aspirated		tsʰ 菜/樹		
Voiceless affricates	plain		ts 書/指/食		
Fricatives			s 士/速		h 海/系
Fricatives			(d)z 爾/貳		h 海/系

Unlike in Hokkien, nasal initials in Teochew are not generally considered allophones of the voiced plosives, as nasals are relatively more common in Teochew and have less usage restrictions. For example, Teochew allows for syllables like nge̍k 逆 ngêg^{8}, which are impossible in Hokkien.

In Southern dialects of Teochew, labial initials (/p/, /pʰ/, /b/, /m/) have labiodental allophones ([pf], [pfʰ], [bv], [mv~ɱ]) before /-u-/.

Character	Pe̍h-ūe-jī	Peng'im	Shantou dialect	Chaoyang dialect
富	pù	bu^{3}	[pu²¹²]	[pfu⁵²]
搬	puaⁿ	buan^{1}	[pũã³³]	[pfũã³¹]
婆	phuâ	pua^{5}	[pʰua⁵⁵]	[pfʰua²³]
配	phuè	puê^{3}	[pʰue²¹²]	[pfʰue⁵²]
武	bú	bhu^{2}	[bu⁵²]	[bvu⁴⁵]
尾	bué	bhuê^{2}	[bue⁵²]	[bvue⁴⁵]
妹	muē	muê^{7}	[mũẽ¹¹]	[mvũẽ⁴³]
滿	muá	muan^{2}	[mũã⁵²]	[mvũã⁴⁵]

=== Syllables ===
Syllables in Teochew contain an onset consonant, a medial glide, a nucleus, usually in the form of a vowel, but can also be occupied by a syllabic consonant like [ŋ], and a final consonant. All the elements of the syllable except for the nucleus are optional, which means a vowel or a syllabic consonant alone can stand as a fully-fledged syllable.

==== Onsets ====
All the consonants except for the glottal stop ʔ shown in the consonants chart above can act as the onset of a syllable; however, the onset position is not obligatorily occupied.

==== Finals ====
Teochew finals consist maximally of a medial, nucleus and coda. The medial can be /i-/ or /u-/, the nucleus can be a monophthong or diphthong, and the coda can be a nasal or a stop. A syllable must consist minimally of a vowel nucleus or syllabic nasal.

Nucleus		-a-			-ɛ̝-			-ɔ̝-		-ɯ- (Note: Only in Northern Teochew. Alternatively analyzed as /ə/.)	-i-	-u-	-ai-		-au-		-oi-	-ou-		-ui-	-iu-	∅-
Medial		∅-	i-	u-	∅-	i-	u-	∅-	i-	∅-	∅-	∅-	∅-	u-	∅-	i-	∅-	∅-	i-	∅-	∅-	∅-
Coda	-∅	a	ia	ua	e	(Note: The rimes /io/, /ĩõ/, /ioʔ/, /iau/, /ĩãũ/ are pronounced as /ie/, /ĩẽ/, /ieʔ/, /iou~iəu/, /ĩõũ~ĩə̃ũ/ in Chaozhou and Chenghai.)	ue	o	io	ɯ	i	u	ai	uai	au	iau	oi	ou		ui	iu	
Coda	-◌̃	ã	ĩã	ũã	ẽ		ũẽ		ĩõ	ɯ̃	ĩ		ãĩ (Note: The rime /õĩ/, as in 前 /tsõĩ˥/, found in Teochew proper and Shantou dialects, is merged with /ãi/ in Jieyang and Southern Teochew. Otherwise, the rime /ãi/ is uncommon in Teochew, and occurs mostly in 愛 /ãĩ˨˩˨/ "to want" and some other words with the same radical.)	ũãĩ (Note: The rime /uĩ/, as in 縣 /kũĩ˨˩/, found in Northern Teochew, corresponds to the Southern Teochew rime /uãi/. Otherwise, the rime /uãi/ is uncommon in Teochew, but occurs e.g. in 檨 /sũãĩ˨˩/ "mango".)	ãũ	ĩãũ	õĩ	õũ		ũĩ	ĩũ	
Coda	-ʔ	aʔ	iaʔ	uaʔ	eʔ		ueʔ	oʔ	ioʔ	ɯʔ	iʔ	uʔ			auʔ		oiʔ				iuʔ	
Coda	-m	am	iam	uam							im											m̩
Coda	-ŋ	aŋ	iaŋ	uaŋ	eŋ	ieng (Note: The rimes /ieŋ/ and /iek/ are only found in Chaozhou dialect. Other dialects merge them with /iang/ and /iak/.)	ueŋ	oŋ	ioŋ	ɯŋ	iŋ	uŋ										ŋ̍
Coda	-p	ap	iap	uap							ip											
Coda	-k	ak	iak	uak	ek	iek	uek	ok	iok	ɯk	ik	uk										

Apart from the aforementioned rhymes, there are a few limitedly used finals with both glottal stop and nasalization, usually found in ideophones and interjections, e.g. he̍hⁿ 嚇 /hẽʔ˥˦/ "agitated; confused", hauhⁿ 殽 /hãũʔ˧˨/ "to eat in large bites", khuàhⁿ-ua̍hⁿ 快活 /kʰũãʔ˨˩˨꜒꜔.ũãʔ˥˦/ "comfortable".

In most dialects of Teochew, historical codas -n and -t are merged with -ŋ and -k. They were still present in mainstream Teochew in the 19th century, but now they are found only in certain peripheral dialects of Teochew, as well as in Hai Lok Hong Min.

The rime /ɯ/ is only found in Northern Teochew. In Southern Teochew (the Chaoyang dialect), this rime is merged with /u/. Chaozhou and Shantou rimes /ɯŋ/ (as in 銀 /ŋɯŋ˥/) and /ɯk/ (as in 迄 /ŋɯk˧˨/), derived from historical /ɯn/ and /ɯt/, are merged with /iŋ/ and /ik/ in Southern Teochew (as well as in Jieyang dialect, where /eŋ/ and /ek/ are used for /ɯŋ, iŋ/ and /ɯk, ik/).

The rime /ŋ̍/, used in vernacular readings, is preserved in all dialects, yet in Northern Teochew it is usually analyzed as identical to /ɯŋ/ (e.g. in 光 /kɯŋ˧~kŋ̍˧/, 堂 /tɯŋ˥~kŋ̍˧/). In Teochew proper and Shantou dialects, this vernacular rime /ɯŋ~ŋ̍/ is merged with /uŋ/ after labial initials (e.g. general Teochew (including Jieyang and Chaoyang) 門 /mɯŋ˥~mŋ̍˥/ and 飯 /pɯŋ˨˩~pŋ̍˨˩/ are pronounced /muŋ˥/ and /puŋ˨˩/ in Chaozhou and Shantou).

Chaozhou /ieng/ and /iek/ are used in syllables that historically had /ien/ and /iet/, e.g. 顯 is different from 響 in Chaozhou (as /hieŋ˥˧/ and /hiaŋ˥˧/) and Hokkien (as /hien˥˧/ and /hiaŋ˥˧/), but not Shantou (both are /hiaŋ˥˧/).

Similarly, Chaozhou /ueŋ/ (as in 亂 /lueŋ˧˥/) and /uek/ (as in 發 /huek˧˨/), historically derived from /uan/ and /uat/, are merged with /uaŋ/ and /uak/ in other dialects (including Shantou, Jieyang, and Chaoyang). There are few cases with the rimes /ueŋ/ and /uek/ in Jieyang and Chaoyang, not derived from /uan/ and /uat/ and corresponding to Teochew proper and Shantou /uaŋ/ and /uak/, e.g. 傾 and 獲 are pronounced /kʰuaŋ˧/ and /uak˥˦/ in Chaozhou and Shantou, but /kʰueŋ˧/ and /uek˥˦/ in Jieyang and Southern Teochew.

=== Tones ===
Teochew, like other Chinese varieties, is a tonal language. Like other Southern Min varieties, Teochew has split the Middle Chinese four tone into two registers (four "dark tones" and four "light tones"). The tones are numbered from 1 through 8, either in the "dark—light" order (the checked tones are 7 and 8) or in the "level—rising—departing—entering" order (the checked tones are 4 and 8). This section follows the second order, as used in Peng'im.

		平 level	上 rising	去 departing	入 entering
陰 dark	tone number (Peng'im)	①	②	③	④
陰 dark	tone diacritic (Pe̍h-ūe-jī)	none	́	̀	none (ending on -p, -t, -k, -h)
陰 dark	tone name	陰平; Im-phêⁿ "Dark-level"	陰上; Im-siăng "Dark-rising"	陰去; Im-khṳ̀ "Dark-departing"	陰入; Im-ji̍p "Dark-entering"
陽 light	tone number (Peng'im)	⑤	⑥	⑦	⑧
陽 light	tone diacritic (Pe̍h-ūe-jī)	̂	̃	̄	̍ (ending on -p, -t, -k, -h)
陽 light	tone name	陽平; Iâng-phêⁿ "Light-level"	陽上; Iâng-siăng "Light-rising"	陽去; Iâng-khṳ̀ "Light-departing"	陽入; Iâng-ji̍p "Light-entering"

Depending on the position of a word in a phrase, the tones can change and adopt extensive tone sandhi.

==== Northern Teochew ====
Northern Teochew dialects are not too different from each other in their tones. There are small differences in pronunciation of the tone ⑦, which can vary between low falling (21 ˨˩) and low level (22 ˨) among different dialects and individual speakers.

	citation tones				post-sandhi tones			
	平 level	上 rising	去 departing	入 entering	平 level	上 rising	去 departing	入 entering
Chaozhou, Chenghai
陰 dark	① 33 ˧	② 53 ˥˧	③ 212 ˨˩˨	④ 32 ˧˨	34 ˧˦	35 ˧˥	53 ˥˧	54 ˥˦
陽 light	⑤ 55 ˥	⑥ 35 ˧˥	⑦ 21 ˨˩ ~ 22 ˨	⑧ 54 ˥˦	23 ˨˧	21 ˨˩ ~ 22 ˨	23 ˨˧	32 ˧˨
Jieyang
陰 dark	① 33 ˧	② 53 ˥˧	③ 212 ˨˩˨	④ 32 ˧˨	33 ˧	35 ˧˥	53 ˥	54 ˥˦
陽 light	⑤ 55 ˥	⑥ 35 ˧˥	⑦ 22 ˨ ~ 21 ˨˩	⑧ 54 ˥˦	22 ˨ ~ 21 ˨˩	21 ˨˩ ~ 22 ˨		32 ˧˨
Shantou, Raoping
陰 dark	① 33 ˧	② 53 ˥˧	③ 212 ˨˩˨	④ 32 ˧˨	33 ˧	35 ˧˥	55 ˥	54 ˥˦
陽 light	⑤ 55 ˥	⑥ 35 ˧˥	⑦ 21 ˨˩ ~ 22 ˨	⑧ 54 ˥˦	21 ˨˩ ~ 22 ˨	22 ˨ ~ 21 ˨˩		32 ˧˨

There are minor differences in tone sandhi among the Northern Teochew dialects:

- The most important difference is that the dark departing tone (③) becomes high falling (53 ˥˧) in Chaozhou and Jieyang and high level (55 ˥) in Shantou and Raoping.
- In Chaozhou, the two level tones (① and ⑤) become slightly rising in sandhi (34 ˧˦ and 23 ˨˧ respectively), rather than level (33 ˧ and 22 ˨ ~ 21 ˨˩) as in other dialects.
- In Jieyang, Chenghai and Chaozhou, the sandhi of tones ②, ③, and ④ have two pronunciations, one being slightly higher (35 ˧˥, 53 ˥˧, 54 ˥˦), used before syllables with high-onset tones (⑤ 55 ˥, ② 53 ˥˧, and ⑧ 54 ˥˦), and another one slightly lower (24 ˨˦, 42 ˦˨, 43 ˦˧), used before all other tones. In Shantou and Raoping, these tones have the same post-sandhi value regardless of the next syllable's tone.
- In Jieyang, Chenghai and Chaozhou, the pronunciation of tone ② will become low level (21 ˨˩) after post-sandhi syllables of tone ②, ③, and ④, which is caused by the assimilation of falling tones.

The light departing tone (⑦) after sandhi is usually merged with the post-sandhi tone ⑤ or ⑥, depending on the dialect. For convenience, since the difference between them is still not large, all three light tones after sandhi may be described as identical and equal to pre-sandhi tone ⑦. The sandhi rules for Northern Teochew may be simplified as follows:

	citation tones				post-sandhi tones			
	平 level	上 rising	去 departing	入 entering	平 level	上 rising	去 departing	入 entering
陰 dark	①	②	③	④	①	⑥	② (Note: Chaozhou, Chenghai, Jieyang) or ⑤ (Note: Shantou, Raoping)	⑧
陽 light	⑤	⑥	⑦	⑧	⑦			④

==== Southern Teochew ====
Southern Teochew tones are noticeably diverse. Based on their tones, the Southern Teochew dialects can be divided into two broad areas: Chaoyang and Hui-Pou.

	citation tones				post-sandhi tones			
	平 level	上 rising	去 departing	入 entering	平 level	上 rising	去 departing	入 entering
Chaoyang (old)
陰 dark	① 21 ˨˩	② 551 ˥˥˩	③ 53 ˥˧	④ 43 ˦˧	33 ˧	53 ˥˧	33 ˧	5 ˥
陽 light	⑤ 44 ˦	⑥ =③	⑦ 42 ˦˨	⑧ 45 ˦˥	44 ˦	21 ˨˩		3 ˧
Chaoyang (new)
陰 dark	① 31 ˧˩	② 55 ˥˥ ~ 35 ˧˥	③ 52 ˥˨	④ 32 ˧˨	31 ˧˩	52 ˥˨	23 ˨˧	5 ˥
陽 light	⑤ 33 ˧ ~ 23 ˨˧	⑥ =③	⑦ 43 ˦˧ ~ 44 ˦	⑧ 45 ˦˥	33 ˧ ~ 23 ˨˧	21 ˨˩		3 ˧
Haimen
陰 dark	① 31 ˧˩	② 551 ˥˥˩	③ 51 ˥˩	④ 43 ˦˧	33 ˧	41 ˦˩	44 ˦	54 ˥˦
陽 light	⑤ 44 ˦	⑥ =①	⑦ 441 ˦˦˩	⑧ 45 ˦˥	44 ˦	33 ˧		43 ˦˧
Dahao
陰 dark	① 21 ˨˩	② 24 ˨˦	③ 52 ˥˨	④ 3 ˧	21 ˨˩	52 ˥˨	33 ˧	45 ˦˥
陽 light	⑤ 33 ˧	⑥ =③	⑦ 31 ˧˩	⑧ 45 ˦˥	33 ˧	21 ˨˩		3 ˧
Puning and Huilai
陰 dark	① 34 ˧˦	② 53 ˥˧ (Note: Puning, Western Huilai, older speakers in Central Huilai) or 55 ˥ (Note: Eastern Huilai, younger speakers in Central Huilai)	③ 31 ˧˩	④ 32 ˧˨	33 ˧	34 ˧˦	55 ˥	54 ˥˦
陽 light	⑤ 44 ˦	⑥ 23 ˨˧	⑦ 42 ˦˨ (Note: Puning, Eastern Huilai) or =③ (Note: Central Huilai) or =⑥ (Note: Western Huilai)	⑧ 54 ˥˦	31 ˧˩	33 ˧		32 ˧˨

Currently, a tone shift is ongoing in the Chaoyang dialect. There is a continuum between the "old accent" and "new accent". This shift is more advanced in urban dialects in Eastern Chaoyang (incl. Haojiang, especially the Dahao dialect), among female speakers, and in the younger generations (born after the 1980s). The principal features of this shift are as follows:

- Dark level tone (①) shifts from 21 ˨˩ to 31 ˧˩.
- Light level tone (⑤) shifts from high level 44 ˦ to mid-level 33 ˧ or mid-rising 23 ˨˧.
- Dark rising tone (②) shifts from high falling 551 ˥˥˩ to high level 55 ˥, and in urban Eastern Chaoyang dialects it can even become high rising 45 ˦˥ or 35 ˧˥.
- Dark departing tone (③) and light departing tone (⑦) are falling in a "parallel" pattern (53 ˥˧ and 42 ˦˨ respectively) in the old accent, while in the new accent they are still falling, but the light departing tone (⑦) is more "flat" (52 ˥˨ and 43 ˦˧~44 ˦ respectively).

"Old" Chaoyang accent is notable for the fact that out of its five non-checked tones, four tones have falling contour.

Hui-Pou dialects are more homogeneous in their tones than Chaoyang dialects. Puning and Eastern Huilai dialects have 8 tones, while Central and Western Huilai have 7 tones (tone ⑦ is merged with other tones). Some of the Huilai dialects undergo tone shift similar to that in Chaoyang dialects, but to a lesser extent (particularly, tone ② becomes high level 55 rather than high falling 53).

==== Neutral tone ====
Like Hokkien, Teochew has the neutral tone. In pronunciation, the neutral tone is considered to be identical to the light departing tone (⑦) in the respective dialect, but when the original tone of the syllable was dark rising (②), the neutral tone is identical to the dark departing tone (③), and when the original tone was an entering tone (④ or ⑧), the neutral tone is identical to the dark entering tone (④).

	citation tones				neutral tone			
	平 level	上 rising	去 departing	入 entering	平 level	上 rising	去 departing	入 entering
Shantou
陰 dark	①	②	③	④	⑦	③	⑦	④
陽 light	⑤	⑥	⑦	⑧	⑦			④

Some works refer to the neutral tone as "left-dominant tone sandhi". However, unlike the general ("right-dominant") Teochew tone sandhi, which is a regular phonetic change, the neutral tone is lexical and its occurrence cannot be predicted. Compare the following examples with the morpheme nî 年 ni^{5} "year", where some words have the neutral tone, while others preserve the original tone.

tsâiⁿ--nî 前年 zain^{5} ni^{5} "year before last"
ău--nî 後年 ao^{6} ni^{5} "year after next"
tuā-tsâiⁿ--nî 大前年 dua^{7} zain^{5} ni^{5} "three years ago"
jĭ-káu--nî 二九年 ri^{6} gao^{2} ni^{5} "year 29"

but:

kim-nî 今年 gim^{1} ni^{5} "this year"
kū-nî 舊年 gu^{7} ni^{5} "last year"
mê-nî 明年 mên^{5} ni^{5} "next year"
jĭ-tsa̍p-ngŏu-nî 二十五年 ri^{6} zab^{8} ngou^{6} ni^{5} "25 years"

== Grammar ==
The grammar of Teochew is similar to other Min languages, as well as some southern varieties of Chinese, especially with Hakka, Yue and Wu. The sequence 'subject–verb–object' is typical, like Standard Mandarin, although the 'subject–object–verb' form is also possible using particles.

=== Morphology ===
==== Pronouns ====
===== Personal pronouns =====
The personal pronouns in Teochew, like in other Chinese languages, do not show case marking, therefore uá 我 ua^{2} means both I and me and i-nâng 伊人 i^{1} nang^{5} means they and them. The Southern Min languages, like some Mandarin dialects, have a distinction between an inclusive and exclusive we, meaning that when the addressee is being included, the inclusive pronoun náng 咱 nang^{2} would be used, otherwise uáng 阮 uang^{2} is employed. Outside Southern Min varieties like Teochew, no other southern Chinese variety has this distinction.

Personal Pronouns in Teochew
	Singular		Plural		
1st person	uá 我 ua^{2}	I / me	Inclusive	náng 咱 nang^{2}	we / us
1st person	uá 我 ua^{2}	I / me	Exclusive	uáng 阮 uang^{2} (Note: Also pronounced úng / ung^{2} in Chaozhou, ńg / ng^{2} in Chenghai)	we / us
2nd person	lṳ́ 汝 le^{2}	you	nṳ́ng, níng 恁 neng^{2}, ning^{2}		you (plural)
3rd person	i 伊 i^{1}	he/she/it/him/her	ing 𪜶 ing^{1} i-nâng 伊儂 i^{1} nang^{5}		they/them

===== Possessive pronouns =====
Teochew does not distinguish the possessive pronouns from the possessive adjectives. As a general rule, the possessive pronouns or adjectives are formed by adding the genitive or possessive marker kâi 個 gai^{5} to their respective personal pronouns, as summarized below:

Possessive Pronouns in Teochew
	Singular		Plural		
1st person	uá-kâi 我個 ua^{2} gai^{5}	my / mine	Inclusive	náng-kâi 咱個 nang^{2} gai^{5}	our / ours
1st person	uá-kâi 我個 ua^{2} gai^{5}	my / mine	Exclusive	uáng-kâi 阮個 uang^{2} gai^{5}	ours / ours
2nd person	lṳ́-kâi 汝個 le^{2} gai^{5}	your / yours	nṳ́ng-kâi, níng-kâi 恁個 neng^{2} gai^{5}, ning^{2} gai^{5}		your / yours (plural)
3rd person	i-kâi 伊個 i^{1} gai^{5}	his / his; her / hers; its / its	i-nâng-kâi 伊儂個 i^{1} nang^{5} gai^{5}		their / theirs

本 書 是 我 個。
púng tsṳ sĭ uá kâi
bung2 ze1 si6 ua2 gai5
CL-books book be I POS
"The book is mine."

As kâi 個 gai^{5} is the generic measure word, it may be replaced by other more appropriate classifiers:

我 條 裙
uá tiâu kûng
ua2 diao5 gung5
I CL-clothes skirt
"my skirt"

===== Demonstrative pronouns =====
Teochew has the typical two-way distinction between the demonstratives, namely the proximals and the distals. The basic determiners are tsí 只 zi^{2} "this" and hṳ́ 許 he^{2} "that", and they require at least a classifier (generic kâi 個 gai^{5}, collective tshoh 撮 coh^{4}, or another), which can be optionally preceded by a numeral.

The Teochew Demonstratives
		Proximal		Distal	
General	Singular	tsí (kâi) 只(個) zi^{2} (gai^{5})	this (one)	hṳ́ (kâi) 許(個) he^{2} (gai^{5})	that (one)
General	Collective	tsí tshoh 只撮 zi^{2} coh^{4}	these (few)	hṳ́ tshoh 許撮 he^{2} coh^{4}	those (few)
General	Plural (non-specific)	tsió 照 zio^{2}	these	hió 向 hio^{2}	those
Type		tsiá 者 zia^{2}	this kind of	hiá 遐 hia^{2}	that kind of
Spatial		tsí kò 只塊 zi^{2} go^{3}	here	hṳ́ kò 許塊 he^{2} go^{3}	there
Spatial		tsí lăi 只內 zi^{2} lai^{6}	here inside	hṳ́ lăi 許內 he^{2} lai^{6}	there inside
Spatial		tsí kháu 只口 zi^{2} kao^{2}	here outside	hṳ́ kháu 許口 he^{2} kao^{2}	there outside
Temporal		tsí tsûng 只陣 zi^{2} zung^{5}	now; recently	hṳ́ tsûng 許陣 he^{2} zung^{5}	then
Degree		tsiòⁿ 照 zion^{3}	this much	hiòⁿ 向 hion^{3}	that much
Adverbial		tsiòⁿ seⁿ (iōⁿ) 照生(樣) zion^{3} sên^{1} (ion^{7})	like this	hiòⁿ seⁿ (iōⁿ) 向生(樣) hion^{3} sên^{1} (ion^{7})	like that

===== Interrogative pronouns =====
The Teochew Interrogative Pronouns
who / whom		tiâng 𫢗 diang^{5}
who / whom		tī tiâng 底𫢗 di^{7} diang^{5}
who / whom		tī nâng 底儂 di^{7} nang^{5}
what		mih kâi 乜個 mih^{4} gai^{5}
what (kind of) + noun		mih 乜 mih^{4} + N
which		tī 底 di^{7} + NUM + CL + N
which		tī kâi 底個 di^{7} gai^{5}
where		tī kò 底塊 di^{7} go^{3}
when		tiang sî 𫢗時 diang^{1} si^{5}
how, why	manner	tsò nî 做呢 zo^{3} ni^{5}
how, why	state	mih seⁿ iōⁿ 乜生樣 mih^{4} sên^{1} ion^{7}
how, why	state	tsò nî iōⁿ 做呢樣 zo^{3} ni^{5} ion^{7}
how, why	state	tsăi seⁿ (iōⁿ) 在生(樣) zai^{6} sên^{1} (ion^{7})
how many; how much		kúi 幾 gui^{2} + CL + N
how many; how much		jio̍h tsōi 若濟 rioh^{8} zoi^{7} + CL + N

==== Numerals ====
Some numerals in Teochew have a literary and vernacular variant.

Value	Literary	Vernacular	Notes
0	零 lêng / lêng^{5}	空 khàng / kang^{3}	零 may also be written as 〇.
1	一 ik / ig^{4}	一 tse̍k / zêg^{8}	蜀 is often considered the original character for tse̍k / zêg^{8}. When spelling numbers digit by digit, iau 幺 iao^{1} is also used for "one".
2	二 jĭ / ri^{6}	兩 nŏ / no^{6}	兩 nŏ / no^{6} may also be written as 二 The character 兩 has a literary reading liáng / liang^{2}.
3	三 sam / sam^{1}	三 saⁿ / san^{1}	Literary reading is used in some set compounds.
4	四 sṳ̀ / se^{3}	四 sì / si^{3}	Literary reading is extremely rare.
5	五 ngóu / ngou^{2}	五 ngŏu / ngou^{6}	Literary reading is used in some set compounds. Also pronounced as ngŏm / ngom^{6} in Southern Teochew.
6	六 la̍k / lag^{8}		Only vernacular reading.
7	七 tshik / cig^{4}		Only literary reading.
8	八 poih / boih^{4}		Only vernacular reading.
9	九 kiú / giu^{2}	九 káu / gao^{2}	Literary reading is used in some set compounds.
10	十 tsa̍p / zab^{8}		Only vernacular reading.
100	百 peh / bêh^{4}		Only vernacular reading.
1000	千 tshoiⁿ / coin^{1}		Only vernacular reading. Also tshaiⁿ / cain^{1} (in Jieyang and Southern Teochew).
10000	萬 buāng / bhuang^{7}		Only literary reading Also buēng / bhuêng^{7} (in Chaozhou). Also bāng / bang^{7} (variant in Southern Teochew).

Generally, vernacular variants are used, and literary readings are limited to certain set compounds and idioms, e.g.: Sam-kok 三國, ngóu-kim 五金, kiú-siau 九霄, ngóu-tsháiⁿ-phiang-hung 五彩繽紛, sam-sṳ-jṳ̂-kiâⁿ 三思而行, kiú-liû-sam-kàu 九流三教, etc.

However, literary forms of 一 and 二 are more commonly used, particularly in the following cases:

- for the last digit in compound numbers:

tsa̍p ik 十一 zab^{8} ig^{4} "eleven"
saⁿ tsa̍p jĭ 三十二 san^{1} zab^{8} ri^{6} "thirty two"

- for counting tens (but not hundreds or thousands) in compound numbers

jĭ tsa̍p ik 二十一 ri^{6} zab^{8} ig^{4} "twenty one"
but:
tse̍k peh 一百 zêg^{8} bêh^{4} "one hundred"
nŏ tshoiⁿ 兩千 no^{6} coin^{1} "two thousands"

- in ordinal numbers, names for days, and dates

tŏiⁿ jĭ 第二 doin^{6} ri^{6} "second"
tsheⁿ khî ik 星期一 cên^{1} ki^{5} ig^{4} "Monday"
tsiaⁿ gue̍h tshiu ik 正月初一 zian^{1} ghuêh^{8} ciu^{1} ig^{4} "first day of the Lunar New Year"
jĭ-khàng-iau-poih-nî jĭ-gue̍h jĭ-hō 2018年二月二號 ri^{6} kang^{3} iao^{1} boih^{4} ni^{5} ri^{6} ghuêh^{8} ri^{6} ho^{7} "February 2, 2018"

=== Passive construction ===
In Teochew passive construction, the agent phrase by somebody always has to be present, and is introduced by the preposition khṳh 乞 keh^{4} or pung 分 bung^{1}, both literally meaning "to give". If the agent is not explicitly named, its position is taken by nâng 儂 nang^{5} (lit. 'a person' or 'somebody').

伊 分 儂 刣 掉。
i pung nâng thâi tiāu
i1 bung1 nang5 tai5 diao7
s/he give person kill {be lost}
"S/he was killed (by someone)."

While in Mandarin one can have the agent introducer 被; bèi or 給; gěi alone without the agent itself, in Teochew it is not grammatical to omit this dummy agent nâng 儂 nang^{5}.

個 杯 分 儂 敲 掉。
kâi pue pung nâng khà tiāu
gai5 buê1 bung1 nang5 ka3 diao7
CL cup give person break {be lost}
"The cup was broken."

(cf. Mandarin 杯子給打破了; bēizi gěi dǎ pòle)

The agent phrase pung nâng 分儂 bung^{1} nang^{5} always comes immediately after the subject, not at the end of the sentence or between the auxiliary and the past participle like in some European languages (e.g. German, Dutch).

=== Comparison ===
==== Comparative construction with two or more nouns ====
Teochew, like Cantonese but unlike Hokkien, uses the construction "X ADJ kuè 過 guê^{3} Y", to express the comparison:

伊 雅 過 汝。
i ngiá kuè lṳ́
i1 ngia2 guê3 le2
s/he beautiful exceed you
"She is more beautiful than you."

(cf. Cantonese 佢靚過你; keoi5 leng3 gwo3 nei5)

However, due to modern influences from Mandarin, the Mandarin structure "X 比 Y ADJ" has also gained popularity over the years. Therefore, the same sentence can be re-structured and becomes:

伊 比 汝 雅。
i pí lṳ́ ngiá
i1 bi2 le2 ngia2
s/he compare you beautiful
"She is more beautiful than you."

(cf. Mandarin 她比你漂亮; tā bǐ nǐ piàoliang)

==== Comparative construction with only one noun ====
The 過- or 比-construction must involve two or more nouns to be compared; an ill-formed sentence will be yielded when only one is being mentioned:

* 伊雅過 (?)

Teochew is different from English, where the second noun being compared can be left out ("Tatyana is more beautiful (than Lisa)". In cases like this, the 夭-construction must be used instead:

伊 夭 雅。
i iău ngiá
i1 iau6 ngia2
s/he comparatively beautiful
"She is more beautiful."

The same holds true for Mandarin and Cantonese in that another structure needs to be used when only one of the nouns being compared is mentioned. Teochew and Mandarin both use a pre-modifier (before the adjective) while Cantonese uses a post-modifier (after the adjective).

- Mandarin

她 {比較} 漂亮
tā bǐjiào piàoliang

- Cantonese

佢 靚 啲
keoi5 leng3 di1

There are two words which are intrinsically comparative in meaning, i.e. iâⁿ 贏 ian^{5} "to win" and su 輸 su^{1} "to lose". They can be used alone or in conjunction with the 過-structure:

只 領 裙 輸 (過) 許 領。
tsí niá kûng su (kuè) hṳ́ niá
zi2 nian2 gung5 su1 (guê3) he2 nian2
"This skirt is not as good as that one."

我 內 個 電腦 贏 伊 個 好 濟。
uá lăi kâi tiĕng-náu iâⁿ i kâi hoh tsōi
ua2 lai6 gai5 {diêng6 nao2} ian5 i1 gai5 hoh4 zoi7
"My computer (at home) is far better than his."

Note the use of the adverbial hoh tsōi 好濟 hoh^{4} zoi^{7} at the end of the sentence to express a higher degree.

==== Equal construction ====
In Teochew, the idea of equality is expressed with the word pêⁿ 平 bên^{5} or pêⁿ-iōⁿ 平樣 bên^{5} ion^{7}:

只 本 書 佮 許 本 平 重。
tsí púng tsṳ kah hṳ́ púng pêⁿ tăng
zi2 bung2 ze1 gah4 he2 bung2 bên5 dang6
"This book is as heavy as that one."

伊 兩 儂 平 平樣。
i nŏ nâng pêⁿ pêⁿ-iōⁿ
i1 no6 nang5 bên5 {bên5 ion7}
"They are the same."

("They look the same/They're as good as each other/They're as bad as each other"; lit. "The two people are the same same way")

==== Superlative construction ====
To express the superlative, Teochew uses the adverb siăng 上 siang^{6} or siăng-téng 上頂 siang^{6} dêng^{2}. The latter variant is usually used with a complimentary connotation.

只 間 物 上頂 好食。
tsí koiⁿ mue̍h siăng-téng hó-tsia̍h
zi2 goin1 muêh8 {siang6 dêng2} {ho2 ziah8}
"This (restaurant) is (absolutely) the most delicious."

伊儂 對 我 上 好。
i-nâng tùi uá siăng hó
{i1 nang5} dui3 ua2 siang6 ho2
"They treat me best." lit. "The people treat me very well."

== Vocabulary ==
Teochew vocabulary consists of several layers, including:

- Pan-Sinitic words, found in most other languages of the Sinosphere (such as Hokkien, Japanese, Mandarin, Cantonese, Korean, etc.), often derived from Literary Chinese or orthographically borrowed from Japanese or Mandarin

ì-kièng 意見 i^{3} giêng^{3} "opinion",
kok-ke 國家 gog^{4} gê^{1} "state; country",
kak-hung 結婚 gag^{4} hung^{1} "to marry",
khùng-nâng 困難 kung^{3} nang^{5} "hard; difficult",
tāu-hū 豆腐 dao^{7} hu^{7} "tofu"
tiĕng-uē 電話 diêng^{6}-uê^{7} "telephone",
tshuk-kháu 出口 cug^{4} kao^{2} "exit",
huang-uàⁿ 方案 huang^{1} uan^{3} "plan; scheme",
bûng-huè 文化 bhung^{5} huê^{3} "culture",
kāng-huâ-kok 共和國 gang^{7} hua^{5} gog^{4} "republic",
tiĕng-náu 電腦 diêng^{6} nao^{2} "computer"

- Basic words derived from Old Chinese, usually via Proto-Min; generally, they are not found in other languages of the Sinosphere, except as morphemes in compound words

lṳ́ 汝 le^{2} "you",
ma̍k 目 mag^{8} "eye",
tṳ̄ 箸 de^{7} "chopsticks",
nâng 儂 nang^{5} "man; person",
saⁿ 衫 san^{1} "shirt"

- Min-specific words, usually shared with other Min languages (or at least Southern Min languages like Hokkien)

ta 灱 da^{1} "dry";
khṳ̀ng 囥 keng^{3} "to hide";
khṳh 乞 keh^{4} "to give";
lim 啉 lim^{1} "to drink";
𠀾歹 bhoi6 pai2: "not bad"; "good"; "pretty good";
查某 za1-bhou2: a woman or girl.

- Teochew-specific words

tàⁿ 呾 dan^{3} "to say; to talk";
ĭⁿ 夗 in^{6} "to sleep";
ngà 㦙 nga^{3} "stupid; foolish";
jṳ̂ 㧫 re^{5} "to wipe; to mop";
tsò-nî 做呢 zo^{3}-ni^{5} "why; how";
唔着 m6 diêh8: incorrect or wrong;
𠁞孬 bhoi6 mo2: "not bad"; "good"; "pretty good";
孬意思 mo2 i3 se3: "sorry"; "excuse me";
孬物 mo2 muêh8: "bad thing"; a person who is "difficult to deal with", or "troublesome";
𠁞物 bhoi6 muêh8: "unable to do" or "incapable";
夭壽 yao1-siu7: a common curse, cursing someone with a shortened life.

Most of the Teochew vocabulary (around 70-80%) consists of the pan-Sinitic words. However, their proportion is much lower among the most basic words used in daily speech, as they tend to belong to the last three categories. This pattern is also seen in other languages of the Sinosphere, e.g. in Japanese, where the Sino-Japanese words constitute around 60-70% of total vocabulary, but only around 20% of words used in common speech.

=== Literary and vernacular readings ===
In Teochew, like in other Min languages, it is common for a character to have at least two readings, called "literary" and "vernacular". The number of such doublets in Teochew is somewhat smaller than in Hokkien, due to Teochew being prone to use only vernacular readings and lose their literary counterparts.

== Relationship with Hokkien ==
Teochew and Hokkien are both Southern Min languages. Hokkien, which is spoken in southern Fujian, shares many phonetic similarities with Teochew, but they have low lexical similarity. Although Teochew and Hokkien share some cognates, there are pronounced differences in most vowels with some consonant and tone shifts.

Teochew has only 51% intelligibility with the Tong'an Xiamen dialect of Hokkien, approximately the same as the percentage of intelligibility as between Russian and Ukrainian languages, while it has even lower mutual intelligibility language with other dialects of the Hokkien language.

Most Teochew people do not speak Hokkien and the majority of Hokkien and Teochew people both see themselves as a distinct ethnic groups / nation. There are a minority of Teochew people who speak Hokkien as their mother tongue, most of whom have close contact or relatives in the neighbouring three originally-Teochew counties of what is now South Fujian, which were ceded to Fujian during the early Tang dynasty and subsequently assimilated into the Hokkien population. These Hokkien-speaking Teochews are more likely to treat Teochew simply as accented dialect of Hokkien. These people usually have a strong sense of Hokkien identity.

=== Pronunciation ===
In Hokkien, denasalization of initial consonants is extensive, and sounds [m], [n], [ŋ] are usually viewed as allophones of /b/, /l~d/, /g/ used with nasalized rhymes. In Teochew and Hai Lok Hong, denasalization is less common.

Character	Teochew	Hokkien
逆 'to go against'	nge̍k	ge̍k
玉 'jade'	ge̍k	ge̍k
宜 'suitable'	ngî	gî
疑 'doubt'	gî	gî
紐 'handle; knob'	niú	liú
柳 'willow'	liú	liú
儂 'man'	nâng	lâng
籠 'cage'	lâng	lâng
慢 'slow'	măng	bān
萬 'ten thousand'	buāng	bān
目 'eye'	ma̍k	ba̍k
墨 'ink'	ba̍k	ba̍k

Hokkien and Hai Lok Hong have three pairs of codas: -ng/-k, -m/-p and -n/-t. Most dialects of Teochew have merged -n/-t with -ng/-k. On the other hand, many Teochew dialects, except urban Shantou and Chenghai, do not dissimilate the Middle Chinese rhyme 凡 -jom, e.g. they have huàm 泛, huăm 範, huap 法, while Hokkien has huàn 泛, huǎn 範, huat 法.

Teochew (except some Southern Teochew dialects) and Hai Lok Hong have 8 citation tones, while most dialects of Hokkien have 7 tones.

In individual rhymes, the differences between Hokkien and Teochew are comparable to differences between the dialects of each language. For example, both Northern Hokkien and Northern Teochew have the /ɯ/ sound, which is not found in Southern Teochew and Southern Hokkien. Northern Hokkien and Teochew both have -ng (in Hokkien and Southern Teochew) or -ung (in Northern Teochew) rhyme in words like 飯 pn̄g/pūng, 門 mn̂g/mûng, while Southern Hokkien and Hai Lok Hong have -uiⁿ instead (飯 pūiⁿ, 門 mûi).

=== Grammar ===
Teochew grammar shows some Cantonese or Hakka influence. For example,

- Teochew uses comparative structure with -kuè 過 "to exceed, to surpass", as in Cantonese, while Hokkien uses native Min comparative construction with an adverb khah 較 "more".
- Teochew, like Cantonese, uses bare classifiers to mean "this", but this usage is not typical for Hokkien.
- Teochew uses relevant classifiers to indicate possession; e.g., the phrase "my book" may be expressed with both uá púng tsṳ 我本書 (with classifier for books) and uá kâi tsṳ 我個書 (with possessive particle) in Teochew, but in Hokkien, only góa ê tsṳ 我兮書 is used.

Teochew differs from Hokkien in function words:

Teochew	Hai Lok Hong	Hokkien	explanation
個 kâi	個 kâi	兮 ê	possessive particle
在 tŏ 囉 lŏ (dialectal)	𫩷 ló	咧 leh 佇咧 tǐ-leh	progressive aspect marker
在塊 -tŏ-kò	恁 -nín	咧 --leh	durative aspect marker
分 pung 乞 khṳh	分 pun 科 kho	予 hōo	passive or causative agent preposition
愛 àiⁿ	愛 àiⁿ	欲 beh	"to want" (modal verb)
好 hoh	好 hoh	真 tsin	"very" (dummy adverb in adjectival sentences)

=== Vocabulary ===
Teochew has many differences with Hokkien in its basic vocabulary. Some of the differences are due to influence from Cantonese, while others are alternative yet still native Min words.

gloss	Teochew	Cantonese	Hokkien
"to see"	睇 thóiⁿ	睇 tái	看 khùann
"to read"	讀書 tha̍k-tsṳ	讀書 duhksyū	讀冊 tha̍k-tsheh
"to sleep"	夗 n̍gh, ĭⁿ	瞓 fan	睏 khùn
"beautiful"	雅 ngiá	靚 leng	媠 súi
"to speak"	呾 tàⁿ	講 góng	講 kóng 說 seh
"what"	乜個 mih-kâi	乜嘢 mātyéh	啥乜 siánn-mi̍h
"child"	孥囝 nou-kiáⁿ	細路 sailouh	囡仔 gín-á
"black"	烏 ou	黑 hāk	烏 oo

Teochew tends to use more vernacular readings where Hokkien prefers the literary readings. For instance, Hokkien uses 多謝 to-siā for "Thank you", with literary reading for the first character, while Teochew reads it with the vernacular reading as tsōi-siā. The character 安 has both literary reading (Teochew ang, Hokkien an) and vernacular reading (both uaⁿ), the latter more commonly used in Teochew (安全 uaⁿ-tshuâng, 安心 uaⁿ-sim, 安穩 uaⁿ-úng, 治安 tī-uaⁿ, etc.), while being rare in Hokkien (used in a few place names: 同安 Tâng-uaⁿ, 南安 Lâm-uaⁿ, 惠安 Hūi-uaⁿ).

For some characters, literary readings only exist in Hokkien (even if used exclusively for declamation of Classical Chinese texts), while many vernacular readings are used only in Teochew.

Character	Type of reading	Teochew	Hokkien	Middle Chinese (Baxter) or Proto-Southern-Min (Kwok Bit-Chee)	Old Chinese (Baxter-Sagart)
肉 'meat'	literary		jio̍k	MC nyuwk	*k.nuk
肉 'meat'	vernacular	ne̍k	he̍k	PSM *nhɯk3	*k.nuk
白 'white'	literary		pe̍k	MC baek	*bˤrak
白 'white'	vernacular	pe̍h	pe̍h	PSM *peʔ8	*bˤrak
前 'before'	literary		tsiân	MC dzen	*dzˤen
前 'before'	vernacular	tsôiⁿ	tsîng / tsâinn / tsûinn	PSM *tsõi2	*dzˤen
蟻 'ant'	literary		gí	MC ngjeX	*m-qʰrajʔ
蟻 'ant'	vernacular	hiă	hiă	PSM *hia4	*m-qʰrajʔ
枝 'branch'	literary		tsi	MC tsye	*ke
枝 'branch'	vernacular	ki	ki	PSM *ki1	*ke
富 'abundant'	literary		hù	MC pjuwH	*pək-s
富 'abundant'	vernacular	pù	pù	PSM *pu5	*pək-s
美 'beautiful'	literary	múi	bí	MC mijX	*mrəjʔ
美 'beautiful'	vernacular	bué		—	*mrəjʔ

== See also ==
- Southern Min
- Hokkien
  - Amoy Hokkien
  - Taiwanese Hokkien
  - Singaporean Hokkien
  - Penang Hokkien
- Languages of China
- List of varieties of Chinese
- Chinese Thais
- Chinese Singaporeans
- Malaysian Chinese
- Indonesian Chinese

== Sources ==
- Beijing da xue Zhongguo yu yan wen xue xi yu yan xue jiao yan shi. (2003). Hanyu fangyin zihui. (Chinese dialectal vocabulary) Beijing: Yu wen chu ban she (北京大学中国语言文学系语言学敎硏室, 2003. 汉语方音字汇. 北京: 语文出版社) ISBN 7-80184-034-8
- Cai Junming. (1991). Putonghua duizhao Chaozhou fangyan cihui. (Chaozhou dialectal vocabulary, contrasted with Mandarin) Hong Kong: T. T. Ng Chinese Language Research Centre (蔡俊明, 1991. 普通話對照潮州方言詞彙. 香港: 香港中文大學吳多泰中國語文研究中心) ISBN 962-7330-02-7
- Chappell, Hilary (ed.) (2001). Sinitic Grammar: Synchronic and Diachronic Perspectives. Oxford; New York: OUP ISBN 0-19-829977-X
- Chen Enquan. (2010). Chao · Pu shuangyan yu ci dian. (Teochew-Mandarin diglossic dictionary) Beijing: Guo ji wen hua chu ban gong si (陈恩泉, 2010. 潮 · 普双言语词典. 北京: 国际文化出版公司) ISBN 978-7-5125-0024-2
- Chen, Matthew Y. (2000). Tone Sandhi: patterns across Chinese dialects. Cambridge, England: CUP ISBN 0-521-65272-3
- DeFrancis, John. (1984). The Chinese language: fact and fantasy. Honolulu: University of Hawaii Press ISBN 0-8248-1068-6
- Li, Xin Kui. (1994). Guangdong de fangyan. (Dialects of Guangdong) Guangzhou, China: Guangdong ren min chu ban she (李新魁, 1994. 廣東的方言. 廣州: 廣東 人民出版社) ISBN 7-218-00960-3
- Li, Yongming. (1959). Chaozhou fangyan. (Chaozhou dialect) Beijing: Zhonghua. (李永明, 1959. 潮州方言. 北京: 中華)
- Norman, Jerry. [1988] (2002). Chinese. Cambridge, England: CUP ISBN 0-521-29653-6
- Ouyang Jueya, Rao Bingcai, Zhou Yaowen, & Zhou Wuji. (2005). Guangzhouhua Kejiahua Chaoshanhua yu Putonghua duizhao cidian. (A comparative dictionary of Cantonese, Hakka, Teochew and Mandarin) Guangzhou: Guangdong ren min chu ban she (欧阳觉亚, 饶秉才, 周耀文, 周无忌, 2005. 广州话, 客家话, 潮汕话与普通话对照词典. 广州: 广东人民出版社) ISBN 7-218-05060-3
- Ramsey, S. Robert (1986). Languages of China. Princeton, N.J.: Princeton University Press ISBN 0-691-06694-9
- Xu, Hui Ling (2007). "Aspect of Chaozhou Grammar A Synchronic Description of the Jieyang Variety / 潮州話揭陽方言語法研究". Journal of Chinese Linguistics Monograph Series (22): 320. JSTOR 23826160.
- Yap, Foong Ha; Grunow-Hårsta, Karen; Wrona, Janick (ed.) (2011). "Nominalization in Asian Languages: Diachronic and typological perspectives". Hong Kong Polytechnic University / Oxford University : John Benjamins Publishing Company ISBN 978-9027206770
- Zhang Xiaoshan. (2010). Xin Chao-shan zidian. (New Chaozhou pronunciation dictionary) Guangzhou: Guangdong ren min chu ban she (张晓山, 2009. 新潮汕字典 普通话潮州话对照). 广州: 广东人民出版社) ISBN 978-7-218-06064-4
