= Hydromethanation =

Chemical process

Hydromethanation is the process by which methane (the main constituent of natural gas) is produced through the combination of steam, carbonaceous solids and a catalyst in a fluidized bed reactor. The process, developed over the past 60 years by multiple research groups, enables the highly efficient conversion of coal, petroleum coke and biomass (e.g. switchgrass or wood waste) into clean, pipeline quality methane.

== Chemistry ==
The chemistry of catalytic hydromethanation involves reacting steam and carbon to produce methane and carbon dioxide, according to the following reaction:

$\ce{2C + 2H2O -> CH4 + CO2}$

The process utilizes a specially designed reactor and depends upon a proprietary metal catalyst to promote chemical conversion at the low temperatures where the water gas shift reaction and methanation take place.

When a feedstock treated with the catalyst is introduced into this reactor and mixed with steam, three reactions occur that efficiently convert the feedstock into methane.

=== Hydromethanation reactions ===
Steam carbon

$\ce{C + H2O -> CO + H2}$

Water-gas shift

$\ce{CO + H2O -> H2 + CO2}$

Hydro-gasification

$\ce{2H2 + C -> CH4}$

The combination of carbon (C) from the carbon feedstock, water (H_{2}O) from steam, and the catalyst, produces pure methane and a pure stream of carbon dioxide (CO_{2}) which is 100% captured in the system and available for sequestration. The overall reaction is thermally neutral, requiring no addition or removal of heat, making it highly efficient.

The development of hydromethanation is an example of process intensification, where several operations are combined into a single step to improve overall efficiency, reduce maintenance and equipment requirements, and lower capital costs.

== Byproducts ==
In addition to methane, hydromethanation produces a high-purity stream of carbon dioxide (CO_{2}), an odorless, colorless greenhouse gas. This CO_{2} stream is fully captured in the process and can be prevented from entering the atmosphere using a process called sequestration. The CO_{2} can be injected into underground oil reserves, through a process called enhanced oil recovery (“EOR”), or geologically sequestered.

Because hydromethanation is a catalytic process that does not rely on the combustion of carbonaceous solids to capture their energy value, it does not produce the nitrogen oxides (NO_{x}), sulfur oxides (SO_{x}) and particulate emissions typically associated with the burning of carbon feedstocks, including certain types of biomass. Due to this quality, it intrinsically captures nearly all of the impurities found in coal and converts them into valuable chemical grade products. Ash, sulfur, nitrogen, and trace metals are all removed using commercial gas clean-up processes and are either safely disposed of or used as raw materials for other products such as sulfuric acid and fertilizer.

== Commercialization ==
GreatPoint Energy, a company founded in 2005 by serial entrepreneur Andrew Perlman, is a forerunner in the development and commercialization of hydromethanation. The company has raised $150 million in venture capital from Dow, AES Corporation, Suncor Energy Inc., Peabody Energy, Advanced Technology Ventures (ATV), Draper Fisher Jurvetson, Kleiner Perkins Caufield & Byers, Khosla Ventures and Citi Capital Advisors (CCA). In May, 2012 GreatPoint Energy and China Wanxiang Holdings closed a $1.25 billion investment and partnership agreement to finance and construct the first phase of a one trillion cubic feet per year coal to natural gas production facility in China. The deal between GreatPoint Energy and Wanxiang was the largest US venture capital investment in 2012.

== See also ==
- Fossil fuel reforming
- Producer gas
- Water gas
- GreatPoint Energy
