= GreatPoint Energy =

GreatPoint Energy, Inc.
- Type: Private
- Industry: Energy
- Founded: 2005
- Founder: Andrew Perlman
- Headquarters: Chicago, Illinois, U.S.
- Products: Natural gas from coal
- Website: www.greatpointenergy.com

GreatPoint Energy, Inc. is a Chicago, Illinois based energy company that produces natural gas from coal, petroleum coke, and biomass utilizing catalytic hydromethanation. GreatPoint Energy was founded in 2005 by serial entrepreneur Andrew Perlman and his business partners. The company has raised $150 million in venture capital from Dow, AES Corporation, Suncor Energy Inc., Peabody Energy, Advanced Technology Ventures (ATV), Draper Fisher Jurvetson, Kleiner Perkins Caufield & Byers, Khosla Ventures and Citi Capital Advisors (CCA).

In May 2012, GreatPoint Energy and China Wanxiang Holdings closed a $1.25 billion investment and partnership agreement to finance and construct the first phase of a one trillion cubic feet per year coal to natural gas production facility in China. The deal between GreatPoint Energy and Wanxiang was the largest US venture capital investment in 2012.

== Technology ==
GreatPoint Energy utilizes a sulfur-tolerant catalyst that enables gasification at the low temperatures where water gas shift and methanation reactions concurrently take place. The catalyst, which is continuously recycled and reused within the reactor, reduces the gasifier operating temperature. Under these lower-temperature conditions pipeline grade methane is produced. As part of the overall process, the technology enables the recovery of contaminants in coal, petroleum coke and biomass as useful byproducts and nearly all of the CO_{2} produced in the process is captured as a pure stream suitable for sequestration or enhanced oil recovery.

== GreatPoint Energy deal in China ==
China has the world's third-largest reserve of coal, making coal such a cheap and abundant fuel source that the country relied on it for about 70% of its energy in 2009. China burns almost as much coal as the rest of the world combined, according to the International Energy Agency, and as a result, air pollution has gotten so bad that a study by the World Bank found that air pollution kills 750,000 people every year in China. Amidst growing public concern, social unrest incidents are growing around the country. For example, in December 2011 the government suspended plans to expand a coal-fired power plant in the city of Haimen after 30,000 local residents staged a violent protest against it, on the grounds that "the coal-fired power plant was behind a rise in the number of local cancer patients, environmental pollution and a drop in the local fishermen's catch."

In addition to environmental costs at home, China's dependence on coal is cause for concern on a global scale. Due in large part to the emissions caused by burning coal, China is now the number one producer of carbon dioxide, responsible for a full quarter of the world's CO_{2} output. According to a recent study, "even if American emissions were to suddenly disappear tomorrow, world emissions would be back at the same level within four years as a result of China’s growth alone." The country has taken steps towards battling climate change by pledging to cut its carbon intensity (the amount of CO_{2} produced per dollar of economic output) by about 40 percent by 2020, compared to 2005 levels. Reuters reports that "emissions and coal consumption will continue to rise through the 2020s, even though at a slower rate, barring a major intervention including a shift to cleaner burning gas from coal" - in other words, "meeting the carbon intensity target will require a significant change in trajectory for carbon emissions and coal consumption." To that end, China has announced a plan to invest 2.3 trillion yuan ($376 billion) through 2015 in energy saving and carbon emission-reduction projects.

GreatPoint Energy's coal gasification technology appeals to China because it allows them to keep using cheap domestic coal, but in a much cleaner manner. In 2012, GreatPoint announced a $1.25 billion deal to build the first of 34 reactors in a remote, coal-rich part of China. The total project will cost an estimated $20 – 25 billion and will supply a trillion cubic feet of natural gas. This represents a massive leap in the scale of domestic production for China, which last year produced only 107 billion cubic feet of natural gas. The deal includes an equity investment of $420 million, the largest ever by a Chinese corporation into a venture-capital-funded U.S. company, according to industry tracker VentureSource.
