= 2025 Shantou residential fire =

Residential fire in China

- Location of the fire in Shantou
- Native name: 汕头「12·9」自建房重大火灾
- Date: 9 December 2025; 6 months ago
- Time: 21:20 (UTC+8; Beijing Time)
- Duration: 43 minutes (until extinguished)
- Venue: A four-storey reinforced concrete self-built house; the ground floor was a hardware and electrical appliance shop
- Location: Xiadongpu Village, Danfeng Road, Xiashan Subdistrict, Chaonan District, Shantou, Guangdong, China; 23.234801°N 116.415567°E
- Also known as: Shantou "12·9" major self-built house fire
- Type: Building fire
- Cause: Under investigation: Arson preliminarily ruled out
- Outcome: Guangdong Provincial Government established an accident investigation team; Shantou City launched a city-wide safety production and fire safety inspection campaign
- Deaths: 12
- Injuries: 8 rescued (some with burns, vital signs stable)
- Property damage: Burnt area approx. 150 square metres
- Inquiries: Guangdong Provincial Government established an investigation team comprising emergency management, fire and rescue, police, and discipline inspection departments
- Identity of victims: Four generations of one family; all 12 were relatives
- Preliminary cause of death: Asphyxiation caused by inhalation of toxic smoke
- Structural features: Fitted with security grilles (some with escape windows); the door on the top floor leading to the neighbour's roof was locked

At 21:20 Beijing Time on 9 December 2025, a fire broke out in Xiashan Subdistrict, Chaonan District, Shantou, Guangdong, China. The fire resulted in the deaths of 12 people from a four-generation family, while 8 others were rescued with injuries. As the building involved was a self-built shophouse containing multiple fire safety hazards, the Guangdong Provincial Government launched a province-wide fire safety inspection campaign.

== Background ==
Chaonan District in Shantou is a major manufacturing hub for the city, possessing distinct industrial clusters such as textiles, clothing, and electronics. There are numerous small and medium-sized business entities in the district, with many buildings adopting a "shop below, home above" or "shop in front, home behind" operational model. The National Fire and Rescue Administration has noted that these mixed-use venues, which combine operations, warehousing, and residence, often lack inherent fire safety conditions and have become one of the primary causes of mass casualty incidents in China. The Oriental Daily News cited netizens recalling that approximately 20 years ago (2005), the Huanan Hotel fire occurred in Xiashan Subdistrict, Chaonan District, causing 31 deaths.

=== Building hazards ===
The building involved was a typical mixed-use shophouse in China. The hardware store on the ground floor stocked a large quantity of plastic pipes, copper wires, motors, and other hardware supplies; these flammable materials generate significant amounts of dense smoke when burning and can even be accompanied by minor explosions. Like many local residential houses, the self-built house had anti-theft security grilles installed on a total of more than thirty windows on both the front and back sides. Although 1 to 2 escape doors were installed on each floor, only one escape hatch on the security grille on the left side of the third floor at the back of the building was found to be open after the fire. Furthermore, although the rooftops of surrounding buildings were mostly interconnected, the small door leading to the neighbour's rooftop was suspected to be locked during the fire, preventing those trapped on the fourth floor from escaping via the roof. A neighbour of the affected house described the fire as spreading rapidly, with black smoke and flames already billowing from the fourth-floor windows at the time.

== Fire ==
The fire occurred at 21:20 on 9 December 2025, at a four-storey reinforced concrete self-built house in Xiadongpu Village, Danfeng Road, Xiashan Subdistrict, Chaonan District, Shantou. The ground floor of the building was a shop named "Yufeng Hardware and Electrical Appliance Store", operated by a Mr. Wu. Established in 2010, the shop mainly sold household appliances, motors, and hardware tools; the first floor (second level) was vacant and used for cargo storage; the owner's four-generation family lived on the second and third floors (third and fourth levels).

Following the alarm, the fire department rapidly deployed personnel to the scene for rescue operations. Open flames were extinguished at 22:03 that night, lasting approximately 43 minutes. Preliminary investigations indicated the burnt area of the building was approximately 150 square metres. Subsequent investigations ruled out the possibility of a criminal case, confirming there was no intentional human factor, though the specific cause of the fire remains under further investigation.

== Casualties ==
The fire caused significant casualties to the four-generation extended family residing there. A total of 20 people were trapped in the accident; ultimately, 12 people sadly perished, with 8 confirmed to have no vital signs at the scene and another 4 dying after emergency medical treatment failed. The victims were all members of the owner Mr. Wu's family, including his parents, grandmother, two younger brothers, sisters-in-law, and several of their children. The 8 survivors included the wife of the owner's eldest son (Mr. Wu) and their 6 children. The survivors suffered varying degrees of burns during their escape and were subsequently rushed to Chaonan District People's Hospital and Shantou Central Hospital for treatment.

=== Escape and fatalities ===
Most victims were found in bedrooms on the third and fourth floors. The fire department preliminarily determined that the majority of deaths were due to asphyxiation from inhaling large amounts of toxic smoke. Survivors primarily escaped from the third floor to safety. The eldest daughter of the owner's eldest son ran from the third floor to the ground floor and successfully escaped the fire through the main entrance; the eldest son's wife took two other children and escaped via the rear door on the ground floor. The remaining 3 children retreated to a balcony window, tightly closing the balcony door to block the smoke and waiting for rescue; they were eventually saved by firefighters who cut through the security grilles. At the time of the incident, the eldest son, Mr. Wu, was not at home. He speculated that 12 relatives, including his elders (parents, grandmother) and the families of his two younger brothers, were likely trapped on the fourth floor. Neighbours stated that at the time of the fire, they saw people calling for help from the fourth-floor windows. Nearby residents also loudly shouted instructions to the trapped individuals to use the connected rooftops to escape, urging them to open the small door leading to the neighbour's roof, but the trapped individuals responded that the lock on the door could not be opened.

== Government response and aftermath ==
Following the fire, the Guangdong Provincial Government established an accident investigation team composed of emergency management, fire and rescue, police, and discipline inspection departments to thoroughly investigate the specific cause of the fire. On the morning of 10 December, the Guangdong Provincial Government held a remote conference on provincial production safety and fire control work, requiring all departments to deeply learn the lessons of the fire. Shantou City immediately launched a large-scale special inspection and rectification campaign targeting major fire risks in places such as self-built houses across the city. Xiashan Subdistrict in Chaonan District also arranged dedicated personnel to properly settle and comfort the survivors and the families of the victims, and continued to inspect related fire safety hazards.

Mr. Wu, the eldest son of the bereaved family, stated that his wife was in poor mental condition following the accident, and the 4 surviving children were still receiving hospital treatment for smoke inhalation and Influenza A infection.
