= Haimen (disambiguation) =

Haimen is a county-level city of Jiangsu, China.

Haimen may also refer to:

- Jiaojiang District, formerly Haimen
  - Haimen goat
- Haimen, Guangdong, town in Shantou
- Haimen Town, Jiangsu, seat of Haimen city
