= Jingdu =

Jingdu may refer to:

- Sima Bao (294–320), courtesy name Jingdu (景度), Jin Dynasty prince
- Jǐngdū (警督) or "inspector", a police rank in China

== Places ==
- Jingdu (京都), one of the former official names of Beijing, used from 1918 to 1928
- Jingdu (京都), a Chinese exonym for the city of Kyoto, Japan
- Jingdu, Chaonan (井都镇), a town in Chaonan District, Shantou, Guangdong, China

== See also ==
- Du Jing (born 1984), Chinese badminton player
