= Peng'im =

Romanization for the Teochew language

Peng'im (Note: simplified Chinese: 潮州话拼音方案; traditional Chinese: 潮州話拼音方案: Diê⁵ziu¹uê⁷ Pêng¹im¹ huang¹uan³ (Teochew) Dio⁵ziu¹uê⁷ Pêng¹im¹ huang¹uan³ (Swatow), Pe̍h-ūe-jī : Tiê-chiu-ūe Pheng-im Huang-uàⁿ or Tiô-chiu-ūe Pheng-im Huang-uàⁿ, Pe̍h-ōe-jī : Tiê-chiu-ōe Pheng-im Hoang-òaⁿ or Tiô-chiu-ōe Pheng-im Hoang-òaⁿ) is a Teochew language romanization system, developed as part of the Guangdong Romanization published by the Guangdong Provincial Education Department in 1960. The system is based on the Swatow dialect. It uses the Latin alphabet, with numbers to denote tones.

Before it was developed, another system called Pe̍h-ūe-jī, which was introduced by missionaries in 1875, had been widely used. Since Teochew has high phonetic similarity with Hokkien, another Southern Min variety, Pe̍h-ōe-jī and Tâi-lô can also be used to transcribe Teochew.

== Alphabet ==
This system uses the Latin alphabet, and includes the letter ê. It does not include f, j, q, v, w, x, or y.

=== Initials ===
There are 18 initial consonants. This includes the zero initial, which is not written with a letter in Peng'im, but is included in the table below as a glottal stop.

Initials
		Bilabial	Alveolar	Velar	Glottal
Voiced (no frictions)	nasal	m [m] 毛	n [n] 年	ng [ŋ] 雅	
Voiced (no frictions)	plosive or lateral	bh [b] 米	l [l] 來/內	gh [g] 鵝/牙	
Voiceless stops	aspirated	p [pʰ] 皮	t [tʰ] 臺	k [kʰ] 可	
Voiceless stops	plain	b [p] 比	d [t] 都	g [k] 歌	[ʔ]
Voiceless affricates	aspirated		c [tsʰ] 菜		
Voiceless affricates	plain		z [ts] 書		
Fricatives			s [s] 士/速		h [h] 海/系
Fricatives			r [(d)z] 爾		h [h] 海/系

=== Finals ===
There are 59 finals:

Finals of Teochew
Classes	Open vowel	Mid vowel	Close vowel
Open Syllable		i [i] 衣	u [u] 汙
Open Syllable	a [a] 亞	ia [ia] 呀	ua [ua] 娃
Open Syllable	o [o] 窩	io [io] 腰	
Open Syllable	ê [e] 啞		uê [ue] 鍋
Open Syllable	e [ɯ] 余		
Open Syllable	ai [ai] 哀		uai [uai] 歪
Open Syllable	oi [oi] 鞋		ui [ui] 威
Open Syllable	ao [au] 歐		
Open Syllable	ou [ou] 烏	iou [iou] 夭	
Open Syllable		iu [iu] 憂	
Nasal vowel		in [ĩ] 丸	
Nasal vowel	an [ã] 噯	ian [ĩã] 營	uan [ũã] 鞍
Nasal vowel		ion [ĩõ] 羊	
Nasal vowel	ên [ẽ] 楹		
Nasal vowel	en [ɯ̃] 秧		
Nasal vowel	ain [ãĩ] 愛		
Nasal vowel	oin [õĩ] 閑		
Nasal Coda		im [im] 音	
Nasal Coda	am [am][庵]	iam [iam] 淹	uam [uam] 凡
Nasal Coda		ing [iŋ] 因	ung [uŋ] 溫
Nasal Coda	ang [aŋ] 按	iang [iaŋ] 央	uang [uaŋ] 汪
Nasal Coda	ong [oŋ] 翁	iong [ioŋ] 雍	
Nasal Coda	êng [eŋ] 英		
Checked tone		ih [iʔ] 裂	
Checked tone	ah [aʔ] 鴨	iah [iaʔ] 益	uah [uaʔ] 活
Checked tone	oh [oʔ] 學	ioh [ioʔ] 約	
Checked tone	êh [eʔ] 厄		
Checked tone	oih [oiʔ] 狹		
Checked tone		ib [ip̚] 邑	
Checked tone	ab [ap̚] 盒	iab [iap̚] 壓	uab [uap̚] 法
Checked tone		ig [ik̚] 乙	ug [uk̚] 熨
Checked tone	ag [ak̚] [惡]	iag [iak̚] 躍	uag [uak̚] 蕕[獲]
Checked tone	og [ok̚] 屋	iog [iok̚] 育	
Checked tone	êg [ek̚] 液		

=== Tones ===
8 tones of Teochew (Note: Chaoyang region does not distinguish light rising and dark departing, Huilai does not distinguish light and dark departing.)
Tones	陰平 (dark level)	陰上 (dark rising)	陰去 (dark departing)	陰入 (dark entering)	陽平 (light level)	陽上 (light rising)	陽去 (light departing)	陽入 (light entering)
Tone value	33	52	213	2	55	35	11	4
Examples	詩、分	死、粉	世、訓	薛、忽	時、雲	是、混	示、份	蝕、佛
Symbols	1	2	3	4	5	6	7	8

Tone is notated as a numeric superscript following the syllable. For example:

- 詩 – si^{1}
- 死 – si^{2}
- 世 – si^{3}
- 薛 – sih^{4}

== Differences in rime ==
This is a list of differences in rime in dialects of Teochew by regions. Tone in Raoping is almost same as in Swatow. Only general differences are listed, some certain distinctions of certain words are not listed.

Swatow	Raoping	Chaozhou	Chenghai	Puning	Jieyang	Chaoyang	Haifeng	Examples
e				e		u	i	餘，許，豬，祠
oi				ôi			ei	鞋
uin				ui	ui	uain		跪，櫃
oin	oin/êng			ain	ain	ain	ain	閒，殿
oih							eih	狹
iao/iou	iao	iou	iou	io/iao				搖，要
io		ie	ie	io				腰
ion		ien	ien	ion				羊
ioh		ieh	ieh	ioh				借，惜，藥，石
am[am]			ang[aŋ]	am[am]				庵
ab[ap]			ag[ak]	ap				盒
iam[iam]		iem[iem]	iang[iaŋ]	iam[iam]				嚴
iab[iap]		ieb[iep]	iag [iak]	iap				壓
im[im]			ing [iŋ]	im				音
ib[ip]			ig [ik]	ip				溼
ang[aŋ]				ang				安
ag [ak]				âk				達
iang[iaŋ]		iêng[ieŋ]		iang				仙
iag [iak]		iêg[iek]		iâk				傑，設
uang[uaŋ]		uêng[ueŋ]		uâng				全，完，緣，彎
uag [uak]		uêg [uek]		uâk				粵
eng [ɯŋ]	eng/ing			êng/ung	êng[eŋ]	ing[iŋ]	ng/eng	斤
eg [ɯk]				êg [ek]	êg [ek]	ig[ik]		乞
ing[iŋ]				ing	êng[eŋ]		in[in]	因
ung[uŋ]				ung			un[un]	溫
