= Lu Guanqiu =

Chinese businessman

Lu Guanqiu 鲁冠球
- Born: 17 January 1945; Hangzhou, Zhejiang
- Died: 25 October 2017 (aged 72)
- Education: Zhejiang University
- Occupations: Founder; Wanxiang Group
- Children: 4

Lu Guanqiu (simplified Chinese: 鲁冠球; traditional Chinese: 魯冠球; pinyin: Lǔ Guànqiú;17 January 1945 – 25 October 2017) was a Chinese billionaire entrepreneur, and the founder of Wanxiang Group. He was the 18th richest person in China, according to the Hurun Report China Rich List 2013, the 286th richest person in the world, and reportedly the richest person in Zhejiang Province. He was a delegate to the Chinese National People's Congress.

== Early life ==
Lu was born in January 1945 in Xiaoshan, Hangzhou, Zhejiang, into a peasant family. When he was 15 years old, he dropped out of school and became an ironsmith.

== Career ==
In July 1969, he co-founded a factory with six other farmers, producing small agricultural machines. Lu later developed his factory into the present Wanxiang Group. It eventually became a large manufacturing conglomerate and a leading producer of automobile facilities and components.

Lu was the president of the board of the Wanxiang Group. Their headquarters are in Xiaoshan District, Hangzhou, Zhejiang. Lu was also a part-time professor for the EMBA program at Zhejiang University. He also was awarded an honorary doctorate from the Hong Kong Polytechnic University.

According to the Forbes China Rich List (福布斯中国富豪榜), Lu was ranked No. 33 with 13.13 billion Chinese Yuan (approximately US$ 1.87 billion). Lu was the richest individual living in Zhejiang Province.

== Personal life ==
Lu was married, with four children, and lived in Hangzhou. He died on 25 October 2017, aged 72.
