= Teochew Romanization =

Writing system for the Teochew language

Teochew Romanization Tiê-chiu Pe̍h-ūe-jī 潮州白話字
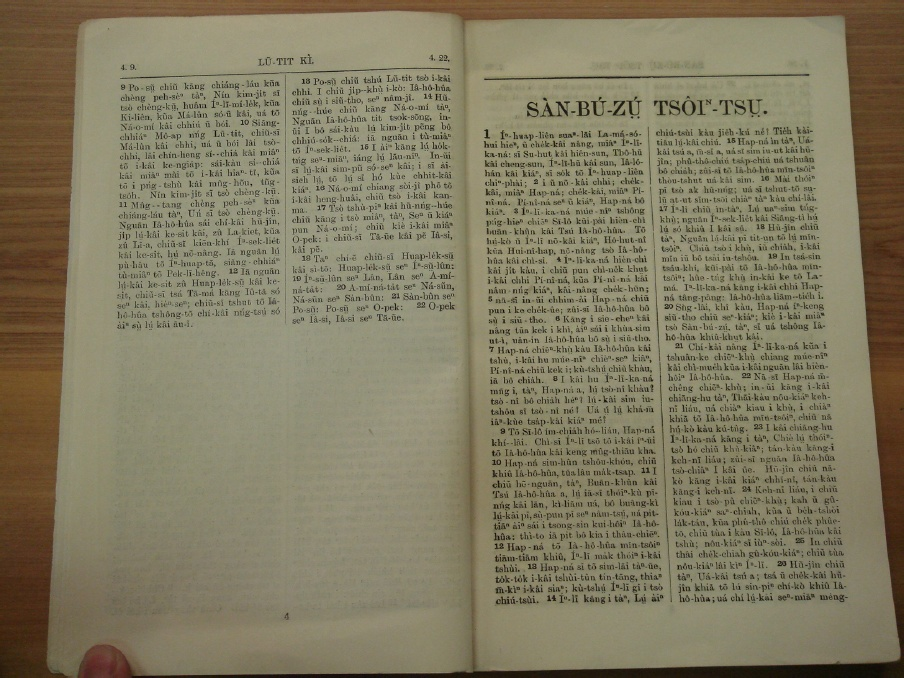
- Bible in Teochew Romanised (1 Samuel), published by the British and Foreign Bible Society, 1915
- Script type: Latin alphabet (modified)
- Creator: John Campbell Gibson; William Duffus
- Period: c. 1875 — ?
- Languages: Swatow dialect and Teochew dialect

Related scripts
- Parent systems: Latin script: Church Romanization; Teochew Romanization

Teochew Romanization, also known as Swatow Church Romanization, or locally as Pe̍h-ūe-jī (Chinese: 白話字; lit. 'Vernacular orthography'), is an orthography similar to Pe̍h-ōe-jī used to write the Teochew language (including Swatow dialect). It was introduced by John Campbell Gibson and William Duffus, two British missionaries, to Swatow in 1875.

== History ==
Romanization of Teochew can be traced back to the 1840s. The earliest attempt to write the language in the Latin script was undertaken by Baptist missionary William Dean in his 1841 publication First Lessons in the Tie-chiw Dialect published in Bangkok, Thailand; however, his tonal system was said to be incomplete.

The first complete orthographic system was devised by John Campbell Gibson and William Duffus, two Presbyterianism missionaries, in 1875. The orthography was generally based on the Pe̍h-ōe-jī system, another work of presbyterian origin devised for the Amoy dialect. The first translation of the Gospel of Luke in Swatow romanization was published in 1876. It has been said that the vernacular orthographic system is more easier for illiterate persons to learn in their own mother tongue.

Besides Gibson and Duffus's original romanization system, several variations of the system were later devised, such as those by William Ashmore (1884) and Lim Hiong Seng (1886).

Other systems developed by Baptist missionaries such as Adele Marion Fielde (1883) and Josiah Goddard (1888) were generally used as a means of phonetic notation instead of a full orthographic system.

Through the church's use of the romanization system, the number of users of the system grew and came to its high point in the 1910s. However, starting in the 1920s, the Chinese government promoted education in Mandarin and more people learned to read and write in Chinese characters. Thus, the promotion of romanized vernacular writing become less necessary. By the 1950s, there were an estimated one thousand users of the system remaining in the Chaoshan area.

== Spelling schemes ==
=== Alphabet ===
The orthography uses 18 letters of the basic Latin alphabet.

Capital letters	A	B	CH	CHH	E	G	H	I	J	K	KH	L	M	N	ᴺ	NG	O	P	PH	S	T	TH	TS	TSH	U	Ṳ	Z
Lowercase letters	a	b	ch	chh	e	g	h	i	j	k	kh	l	m	n	ⁿ	ng	o	p	ph	s	t	th	ts	tsh	u	ṳ	z

=== Initial ===
The initial consonants in Teochew are listed below:

The letters in the table represent the initial with its pronunciation in IPA, followed by the example of Chinese word and its translation in Teochew romanization.

		Lateral	Nasal	Stop		Affricate		Fricative
		Lateral	Nasal	Unaspirated	Aspirated	Unaspirated	Aspirated	Fricative
Bilabial	Voiceless			p [p] 邊 (pian)	ph [pʰ] 頗 (phó)			
Bilabial	Voiced		m [m] 門 (mûn)	b [b] 文 (bûn)				
Alveolar	Voiceless			t [t] 地 (tī)	th [tʰ] 他 (tha)	ts [ts] 之 (tsṳ)	tsh [tsʰ] 出 (tshut)	s [s] 思 (sṳ)
Alveolar	Voiced	l [l] 柳 (liú)	n [n] 挪 (nô)			z [dz] 而 (zṳ̂)		
Alveolo-palatal	Voiceless					ch [tɕ] 貞 (cheng)	chh [tɕʰ] 刺 (chhì)	s [ɕ] 時 (sî)
Alveolo-palatal	Voiced					j [dʑ] 入 (ji̍p)		
Velar	Voiceless			k [k] 球 (kiû)	kh [kʰ] 去 (khṳ̀)			
Velar	Voiced		ng [ŋ] 俄 (ngô)	g [ɡ] 語 (gṳ́)				
Glottal	Voiceless							h [h] 喜 (hí)

The affricate consonants ts/ch, tsh/chh, and z/j are three allophone pairs where those voiced and voiceless alveolar affricate will shift to voiced and voiceless alveolo-palatal affricate when they meet with close or close-mid front vowels (i, e).

=== Finals ===
The rhymes used in the orthography are listed below:

The Latin alphabet sets in the table represent the spelling of syllable final in the system with its pronunciation in IPA, followed by the example of Chinese word and its translation in Teochew romanization.

Vowels					Coda-ending							
Types	Articulation		Simple	Nasal	Glottal Stop		Bilabial		Alveolar		Velar	
Types	Backness	Height	Simple	Nasal	Simple	Nasal	Nasal	Stop	Nasal	Stop	Nasal	Stop
Monophthongs	Front	Open	a [a] 膠 (ka)	aⁿ [ã] 柑 (kaⁿ)	ah [aʔ] 甲 (kah)	ahⁿ [ãʔ] 垃 (na̍hⁿ)	am [am] 甘 (kam)	ap [ap̚] 鴿 (kap)	an [an] 干 (kan)	at [at̚] 結 (kat)	ang [aŋ] 江 (kang)	ak [ak̚] 覺 (kak)
Monophthongs	Front	Mid	e [e] 家 (ke)	eⁿ [ẽ] 更 (keⁿ)	eh [eʔ] 格 (keh)	ehⁿ [ẽʔ] 脈 (me̍hⁿ)					eng [eŋ] 經 (keng)	ek [ek̚] 革 (kek)
Monophthongs	Front	Close	i [i] 枝 (ki)	iⁿ [ĩ] 天 (thiⁿ)	ih [iʔ] 砌 (kih)	ihⁿ [ĩʔ] 碟 (tihⁿ)	im [im] 金 (kim)	ip [ip̚] 急 (kip)	in [in] 新 (sin)	it [it̚] 吉 (kit)		
Monophthongs	Back	Mid	o [o] 高 (ko)	oⁿ [õ] 望 (mōⁿ)	oh [oʔ] 閣 (koh)	ohⁿ [õʔ] 瘼 (mo̍hⁿ)					ong [oŋ] 公 (kong)	ok [ok̚] 國 (kok)
Monophthongs	Back	Close	u [u] 龜 (ku)		uh [uʔ] 嗝 (kuh)				un [un] 君 (kun)	ut [ut̚] 骨 (kut)		
Monophthongs	Back	Close	ṳ [ɯ] 車 (kṳ)		ṳh [ɯʔ] 嗻 (tsṳ̍h)				ṳn [ɯn] 巾 (kṳn)	ṳt [ɯt̚] 乞 (khṳt)		
Diphthongs	Front	Closing	ai [ai] 皆 (kai)	aiⁿ [ãĩ] 愛 (àiⁿ)	aih [aiʔ] 𫠡 (ga̍ih)	aihⁿ [ãiʔ] 捱 (nga̍ihⁿ)						
Diphthongs	Backward	Closing	au [au] 交 (kau)	auⁿ [ãũ] 好 (hàuⁿ)	auh [auʔ] 樂 (ga̍uh)	auhⁿ [ãuʔ] 鬧 (nauhⁿ)						
Diphthongs	Front	Opening	ia [ia] 佳 (kia)	iaⁿ [ĩã] 京 (kiaⁿ)	iah [iaʔ] 揭 (kiah)		iam [iam] 兼 (kiam)	iap [iap̚] 劫 (kiap)			iang [iaŋ] 姜 (kiang)	iak [iak̚] 龠 (iak)
Diphthongs	Front	Opening	ie [ie] 蕉 (chie)	ieⁿ [ĩẽ] 薑 (kieⁿ)	ieh [ieʔ] 借 (chieh)				ien [ien] 堅 (kien)	iet [iet̚] 潔 (kiet)		
Diphthongs	Backward	Opening									iong [ioŋ] 恭 (kiong)	iok [iok̚] 鞠 (kiok)
Diphthongs	Backward	Close	iu [iu] 鳩 (khiu)	iuⁿ [ĩũ] 幼 (iùⁿ)								
Diphthongs	Forward	Closing	oi [oi] 雞 (koi)	oiⁿ [õĩ] 間 (koiⁿ)	oih [oiʔ] 夾 (koih)							
Diphthongs	Back	Closing	ou [ou] 孤 (kou)	ouⁿ [õũ] 虎 (hóuⁿ)								
Diphthongs	Forward	Opening	ua/oa (Note: The oa group of finals is used as a variant of ua after the initials t and th, which is only found in William Duffus and William Ashmore's works) [ua] 柯 (kua)	uaⁿ/oaⁿ [ũã] 官 (kuaⁿ)	uah/oah [uaʔ] 割 (kuah)		uam [uam] 凡 (huâm)	uap [uap̚] 法 (huap)	uan [uan] 關 (kuan)	uat [uat̚] 決 (kuat)	uang [uaŋ] 光 (kuang)	uak [uak̚] 廓 (kuak)
Diphthongs	Forward	Opening	ue [ue] 瓜 (kue)	ueⁿ [ũẽ] 果 (kúeⁿ)	ueh [ueʔ] 郭 (kueh)	uehⁿ [uẽʔ] 襪 (gu̍ehⁿ)						
Diphthongs	Forward	Close	ui [ui] 規 (kui)	uiⁿ [ũĩ] 跪 (kũiⁿ)								
Triphthongs	Backward	Close-up	iau [iau] 驕 (kiau)	iauⁿ [ĩãũ] 掀 (hiauⁿ)	iauh [iauʔ] 躍 (iauh)	iauhⁿ [iãuʔ] 躍 (iauhⁿ)						
Triphthongs	Backward	Close-up	iou (Note: The iou group of finals is only used by Lim Hiong Seng as a variant of iau) [iou] 驕 (kiou)	iouⁿ [ĩõũ] 掀 (hiouⁿ)	iouh [iouʔ] 躍 (iouh)	iouhⁿ[iõuʔ] 躍 (iouhⁿ)						
Triphthongs	Forward	Close-up	uai [uai] 乖 (kuai)	uaiⁿ [ũãĩ] 檨 (suāiⁿ)		uaihⁿ [uãiʔ] 轉 (ua̍ihⁿ)						
Syllabic consonant					ngh [ŋʔ] 夗 (n̍gh)		m [m] 唔 (m̃)				ng [ŋ] 黃 (n̂g)	
Syllabic consonant											hng [ŋ̊ŋ̍] 園 (hn̂g)	

Nowadays, in most cities in Chaoshan, alveolar codas (-n/-t) have largely shifted to velar codas (-ng/-k); therefore, they are not found in the Peng'im system which was developed later in the 1960s. However, these codas are still present among native speakers particularly in few border townships like Fenghuang (鳳凰), Sanrao (三饒), and Nan'ao.

=== Tones ===
There are eight tones in Teochew and are indicated as below,

Number	1	2	3	4	5	6	7	8
Chinese Tone names (modern)	Dark-level 陰平 (Im-phêⁿ)	Dark-rising 陰上 (Im-siãng)	Dark-departing 陰去 (Im-khṳ̀)	Dark-entering 陰入 (Im-ji̍p)	Light-level 陽平 (Iâng-phêⁿ)	Light-rising 陽上 (Iâng-siãng)	Light-departing 陽去 (Iâng-khṳ̀)	Light-entering 陽入 (Iâng-ji̍p)
Chinese Tone names (alternative)	Upper-even 上平 (Chiẽⁿ-phêⁿ)	Upper-high 上上 (Chiẽⁿ-siãng)	Upper-going 上去 (Chiẽⁿ-khṳ̀)	Upper-entering 上入 (Chiẽⁿ-ji̍p)	Lower-even 下平 (Ẽ-phêⁿ)	Lower-high 下上 (Ẽ-siãng)	Lower-going 下去 (Ẽ-khṳ̀)	Lower-entering 下入 (Ẽ-ji̍p)
Chinese Tone names (traditional)	Upper-level 上平 (Chiẽⁿ-phêⁿ)	Rising 上聲 (Siãng-siaⁿ)	Upper-departing 上去 (Chiẽⁿ-khṳ̀)	Upper-entering 上入 (Chiẽⁿ-ji̍p)	Lower-level 下平 (Ẽ-phêⁿ)	Lower-departing 下去 (Ẽ-khṳ̀)	Departing 去聲 (Khṳ̀-siaⁿ)	Lower-entering 下入 (Ẽ-ji̍p)
Pitches	˧ (33)	˥˨ (52)	˨˩˧ (213)	˨ (2)	˥ (55)	˧˥ (35)	˩ (11)	˦ (4)
Tone types	Mid level	High falling	Low dipping	Low stop	Top level	High rising	Bottom level	High stop
Diacritics	none	Acute accent	Grave accent	none	Circumflex	Tilde	Macron	Overstroke
Example	hun 分	hún 粉	hùn 訓	hut 忽	hûn 雲	hũn 混	hūn 份	hu̍t 佛
Sandhi	1	6	2 or 5	8	7 or 3	3 or 7	7 or 3	4

Both the first and the fourth tones are unmarked but can be differenced by their coda-endings; those with the first tone end with an open vowel which could be either simple or nasalised, or end in a nasal consonant such as -m, -n, -ng, while those with the fourth tone end with a stop consonant such as -p, -t, -k, and -h.

Teochew features tone sandhi where for any compound that contains more than one word (a syllable), sandhi rules apply to all words except the last one in each phrase. For example, in the Swatow dialect, Tiê-chiu Pe̍h-ūe-jī would be pronounced as Tiē-chiu Peh-ùe-jī, where all words in the compound (linked by a hyphen) undergo tone sandhi except for the final word in each compound: chiu and jī. The tones markings of each word do not actually change to indicate tone sandhi and are written with their original tone markings.

== See also ==
- Peng'im
