= 2011 Haimen protests =

Environmental protest in Haimen, China

2011 Haimen protest
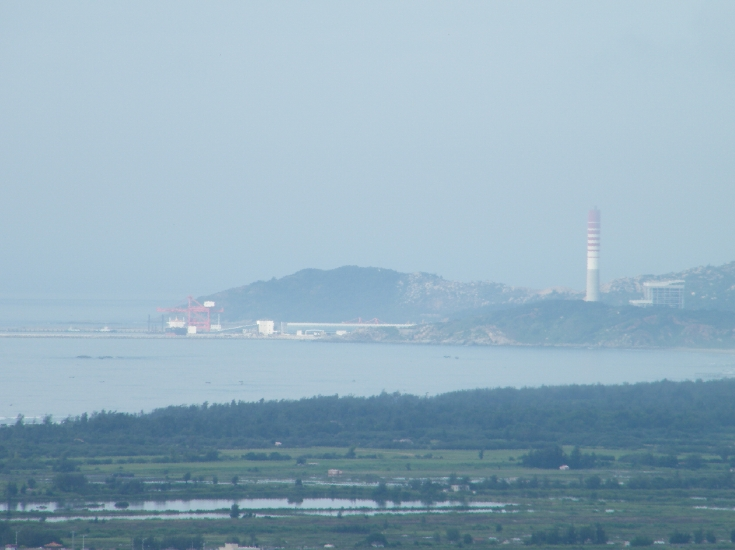
- The first power plant in Haimen. Concerns about the construction of a second such plant sparked the December 2011 protests and riots.
- Date: December 2011
- Location: Haimen, Shantou, Guangdong, People's Republic of China
- Also known as: Haimen Incident
- Participants: People in Haimen Town (Teochew people)
- Outcome: Project is suspended

The 2011 Haimen protest of December 2011 occurred in the Chinese town of Haimen, Guangdong. The protests, which drew thousands of participants, were met with detentions and tear gassing by authorities.

Protests were ignited over plans to expand a coal-fired power plant in the town—a plan that residents opposed, arguing that existing coal-fired plants had caused environmental and health damage. Demonstrations began on Tuesday, 20 December when thousands of residents barricaded a freeway and surrounded government offices in an attempt to block the project.

According to AFP, the riot police fired tear gas into the crowd and beat protesters with riot sticks. Late on 20 December, the state-run Xinhua News Agency said that five residents had been detained on vandalism charged, and published a declaration from the Shantou city council announcing that the "Shantou deputy and municipality already decided to stop the project. Unconfirmed reports of two deaths circulated online following the first day of protests, though authorities denied these reports.

Tensions cooled by 23 December, after Communist Party officials declared that the plant expansion plans would be temporarily suspended, and authorities agreed to release detained protesters.

Although the protests in Haimen were unrelated to demonstrations in nearby Wukan, Haimen residents told Reuters that they had followed developments in Wukan closely, regarding it as a good model of how citizens might negotiate with authorities.

== See also ==
- Protest of Wukan
- List of civil disturbances in the People's Republic of China (2011)
