= Andrew Perlman =

American entrepreneur (born 1975)

Andrew T. Perlman
- Born: June 19, 1975 (age 50); Boston, Massachusetts, U.S.
- Occupation(s): Inventor, Entrepreneur
- Title: General Partner at GreatPoint Ventures
- Board member of: Oasys Water, AMP Americas, Coskata Energy

Andrew Perlman (born June 19, 1975) is an American entrepreneur who has co-founded nine venture-backed companies in the telecom, high-tech, pharmaceuticals, energy, water, and biotechnology industries. He is currently general partner of GreatPoint Ventures, and the former chairman and CEO of GreatPoint Energy, a company based in Chicago, Illinois which develops technology to produce clean natural gas from coal. Perlman has been featured on the MIT Technology Review’s list of the world's top 35 innovators under the age of 35 and Crain’s Chicago Business’s list of 40 leaders under 40 in Chicago. Perlman and GreatPoint Energy have been profiled by The Wall Street Journal, NPR, Forbes, and Fast Company.

== Early life ==
Perlman was born in Boston and grew up in the cities of Newton and Cohassett in Massachusetts. At age 12, he began tracking down the owners of dormant bank accounts, and taking a 20% commission in exchange for leading them to their forgotten money.

Later in his youth, he unsuccessfully applied for a federal license to construct an ethanol still in his parents’ house.

Perlman began college at Washington University in St. Louis, and as a sophomore he attempted to license and commercialize a university-owned technology to prevent credit card fraud. The university turned him down because he was still a student, so Perlman dropped out.

== Early career ==
Perlman and a friend dropped out of Washington University and moved to Washington D.C., where they “hung around business and government offices, knocking on doors, asking anyone they could find about some kind of new technology they could turn into a business.” The two had little technical education, but through research and trial and error, they built a device that converts voice calls into a data format. By age 22, they signed a deal for the first $14 million in startup financing for their new company Cignal Global Communications. Three years later, Perlman sold the company for $200 million.

== Previous companies ==
Perlman went on to “launch five successful startups before he turned 30.” On its list of the world’s top 35 innovators under 35, the MIT Technology Review cites Perlman’s former project GreatPoint Energy as well as other disruptive technology ventures in important areas, writing “cheaper desalination plants, anti-obesity medicines, drugs that fight diseases of old age, and [processes for converting garbage into biofuel and generating electricity from geothermal energy.”

Perlman is on the board of directors at Jetti Resources.
