= Huilai County =

Huilai 惠来县 Hweilai
- County
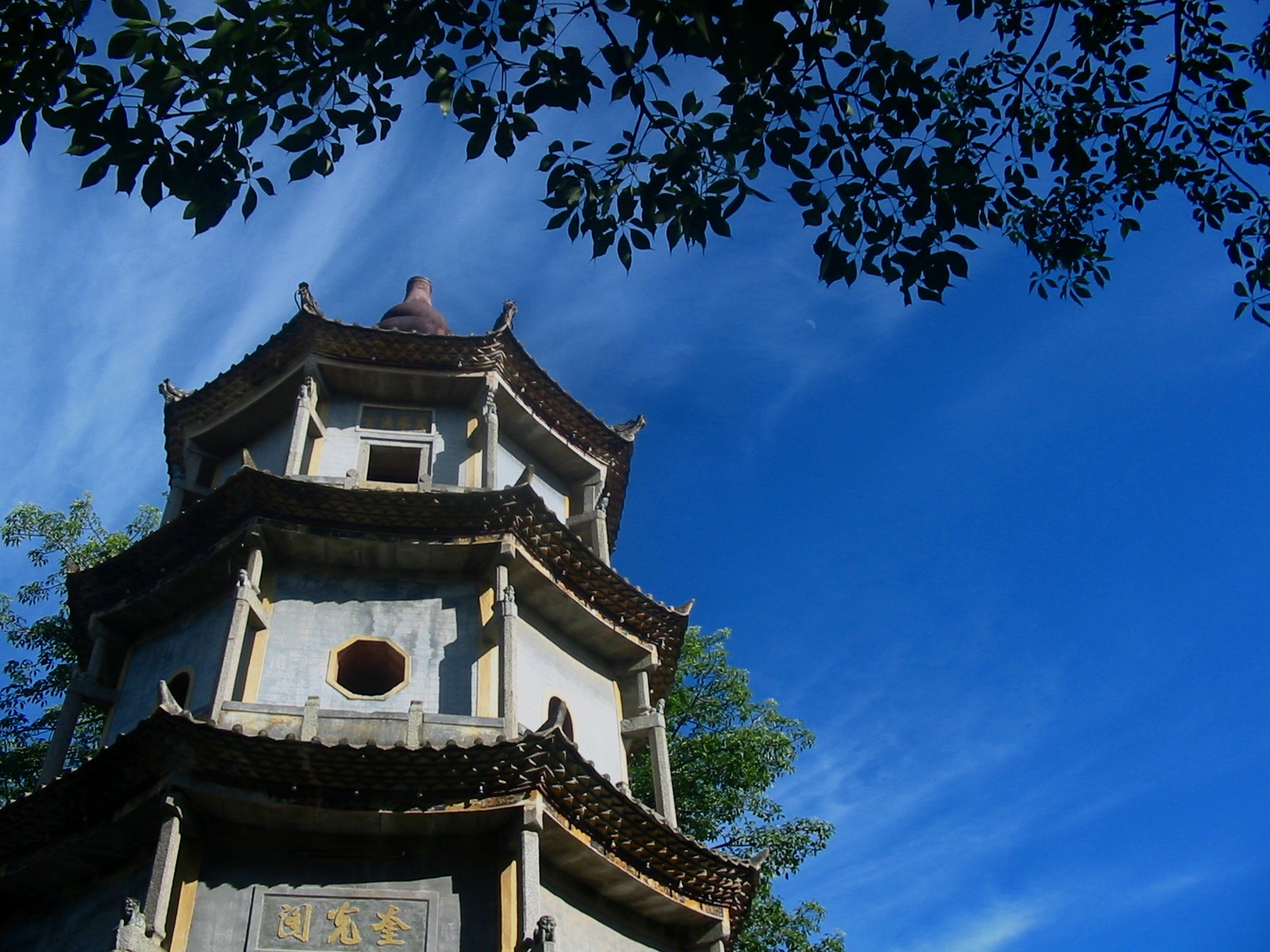
- Kuigang Pavilion

- Location of the seat in Guangdong
- Coordinates: 23.033°N 116.293°E
- Country: People's Republic of China
- Province: Guangdong
- Prefecture-level city: Jieyang

Area
  - Total: 1,207 km^{2} (466 sq mi)

Population (2020)
  - Total: 1,040,779
  - Density: 862.3/km^{2} (2,233/sq mi)
- Time zone: UTC+8 (China Standard)

Huilai County (postal: Hweilai; simplified Chinese: 惠来县; traditional Chinese: 惠來縣; pinyin: Huìlái Xiàn) is a county covering part of the eastern coast of Guangdong province, China, facing the South China Sea to the south. It lies under the jurisdiction of Jieyang. According to the 2020 Chinese census, the county has a population of 1,040,779 under its hukou, (household registration) system. Amongst them, 437,430 are downtown residents.

== History ==
=== Ancient Period ===
In ancient times, the territory of present‑day Huilai belonged to the lands of the Baiyue (百越) peoples. During the Qin and Han dynasties, it fell under the jurisdiction of Boluo (博羅) and Jieyang (揭陽) counties of Nanhai Commandery (南海郡). In 331 CE (Xianhe 6, Eastern Jin; 東晉鹹六年), a portion of Jieyang County was separated to establish Haining County (海寧縣), which belonged to Dongguan Commandery (東官郡); its administrative seat was located in what is now western Huilai. In 621 CE (Wude 4, Tang dynasty; 唐武德四年), Haining was merged into Haiyang County (海陽), under the administration of Chaozhou Prefecture (潮州府).

In 1524 (Jiajing 3, Ming dynasty; 明嘉靖三年), parts of Chaoyang County (潮陽縣) and Haifeng County (海豐縣) were carved out to create Huilai County, which thereafter remained under the administration of Chaozhou Prefecture until the end of the Qing dynasty. The county was named after Huilai Du (惠來都; Du was a subdivision of a County), the administrative division where the county seat was established. In 1525 (Jiajing 4; 嘉靖四年), the county seat was fortified as a walled city and named Huicheng (惠城). Because it lies to the southeast of Kuiling (葵嶺), it was also historically known as Kuiyang (葵陽; lit. south of Kuiling). Kuiling was named for the abundant growth of mallow (葵, kuí) or sunflower-like plants that historically covered the mountain ridge.

=== Republic Period (1912–1949) ===
In the early Republic of China, especially during the Eastern Expedition campaigns (東征時期) of the 1920s, the Guangdong Military Government established a series of transitional administrative and military bodies to restore governance in the Dongjiang, Chaoshan, and Meixian regions after they were retaken. These institutions reflected the evolving balance between military control and civil administration. Their functions shifted progressively from military pacification (軍事平定) with Reconstruction Offices (善後處), to administrative restoration (行政恢復) with the Administrative Offices (行政公署), and finally to regional security and stabilization with the Pacification Commissions (綏靖公署).

During the Republic of China period, Huilai County was successively placed under the jurisdiction of the Guangdong Military Governor’s Office (廣東都督府), the Chao‑Xun Circuit (潮循道) under the Provincial Surveillance Commissioner (巡按使), the Dongjiang Administrative Commission (東江行政委員公署), the Eastern District Pacification Commission (東區綏靖委員公署), and later the Fifth and Seventh Administrative Inspectorates of Guangdong Province (廣東省第五、第七區行政督察專員公署).

In 1912 (民國元年; the first year of the Republic of China), following the abolition of the Qing prefectural system, Huilai County came under the Chaoshan Pacification Commissioner (潮汕安撫使), an office subordinate to the Guangdong Military Governor’s Office and responsible for the former Chaozhou region. In 1914 (民國三年), the Provincial Surveillance Commissioner established the Chao‑Xun Circuit (潮循道), headed by a daoyin (道尹). As a formal administrative division under the Beiyang government (北洋政府), it governed the former regions of Chaozhou, Huizhou, and adjacent areas. In 1920, Huilai was reassigned to the Chao‑Mei Reconstruction Office (潮梅善後處), and in 1925 to the Dongjiang Administrative Reconstruction Office (東江行政善後處). By April 1949, shortly before the founding of the People’s Republic of China, the county was incorporated into the Seventh Administrative District of the Chaoshan Region (潮汕地區第七區).

After the first Eastern Expedition recaptured the Chaozhou–Meixian area in 1925, the government created the Chao‑Mei Reconstruction Office (潮梅善後處) to restore order in the immediate aftermath of the campaign. Its jurisdiction covered the Chaoshan and Meixian regions, and its functions were later inherited by broader transitional bodies. As the Eastern Expedition expanded across the Dongjiang basin—including Huizhou, Chaozhou, and Meixian—the Dongjiang Administrative Reconstruction Office (東江行政善後處) was established to coordinate governance across the entire war zone (東江戰區). This represented a shift from localized postwar management to region‑wide administrative consolidation. By late 1925, as military conditions stabilized, its responsibilities were gradually transferred to newly formed administrative offices. In November 1925, following the second Eastern Expedition, the Dongjiang Administrative Reconstruction Office was formally reorganized to replace the earlier Chao‑Mei Reconstruction Office. Proposed by Chiang Kai‑shek, the reorganization aimed to unify postwar administration across all Dongjiang jurisdictions. However, in February 1926, the Guangdong Nationalist Government adopted a more formal administrative committee system, abolishing the office and replacing it with the Dongjiang Administrative Committee Office.

On 1 February 1926, the Dongjiang Administrative Committee Office (東江行政委員公署), also known as the Administrative Committee Office for the Dongjiang Jurisdictions (東江各屬行政委員公署), was officially established in Shantou. Appointed by the Guangdong Nationalist Government, its administrative commissioners, including at one point Zhou Enlai (周恩來), oversaw governance in the Dongjiang region. With the launch of the Northern Expedition (北伐) and the restructuring of local administration, the office completed its transitional mission and was abolished in July 1926. In July 1926, the Dongjiang Administrative Committee Office was replaced by the Eastern District Pacification Commission (東區綏靖委員公署). Formed during the period of cooperation between the Nanjing and Guangdong factions (寧粵合流), and associated with the Chen Jitang (陳濟棠) administration, this body strengthened military and security control over eastern Guangdong, including the Chao‑Mei and Dongjiang regions. It functioned as a military or semi‑military institution focused on stabilization after basic civil administration had been restored. As Chiang Kai‑shek’s central forces entered Guangdong and Chen Jitang fell from power, the older local pacification system was reorganized. The commission was eventually replaced by the Nationalist Government’s Administrative Inspectorates and new military structures, and was abolished around 1936 following the Liangguang Incident (兩廣事變).

=== PRC period (1949–present) ===
In May 1949, the Chinese Communist Party (CCP) took control of Huilai, and a new government was established in August of the same year. In December 1958, Huilai County was abolished and its territory was merged into Puning and Chaoyang counties. In March 1961, the county was restored as an independent administrative unit. In 1983, following the merger of Shantou Prefecture and Shantou City, Huilai County was placed under the jurisdiction of Shantou. On 7 December 1991, with the approval of the State Council, the administrative status of Jieyang County was abolished and the prefecture‑level city of Jieyang was established, administering Rongcheng District, Jiedong County, Puning City, Jiexi County, and Huilai County. In 1992, when Jieyang was upgraded from a county‑level city to a prefecture‑level city, Huilai County was reassigned to Jieyang’s administration, where it remains today.

== Climate ==
Climate data for Huilai, elevation 42 m (138 ft), (1991–2020 normals, extremes 1981–2010)
| Month | Jan | Feb | Mar | Apr | May | Jun | Jul | Aug | Sep | Oct | Nov | Dec | Year |
|---|---|---|---|---|---|---|---|---|---|---|---|---|---|
| Record high °C (°F) | 28.0 (82.4) | 28.5 (83.3) | 30.5 (86.9) | 32.5 (90.5) | 34.4 (93.9) | 36.1 (97.0) | 38.4 (101.1) | 37.0 (98.6) | 35.5 (95.9) | 34.6 (94.3) | 32.0 (89.6) | 29.7 (85.5) | 38.4 (101.1) |
| Mean daily maximum °C (°F) | 19.4 (66.9) | 20.0 (68.0) | 22.3 (72.1) | 25.6 (78.1) | 28.5 (83.3) | 30.4 (86.7) | 32.0 (89.6) | 31.9 (89.4) | 31.2 (88.2) | 28.7 (83.7) | 25.4 (77.7) | 21.2 (70.2) | 26.4 (79.5) |
| Daily mean °C (°F) | 14.9 (58.8) | 15.7 (60.3) | 18.0 (64.4) | 21.7 (71.1) | 25.0 (77.0) | 27.4 (81.3) | 28.5 (83.3) | 28.3 (82.9) | 27.3 (81.1) | 24.6 (76.3) | 21.0 (69.8) | 16.8 (62.2) | 22.4 (72.4) |
| Mean daily minimum °C (°F) | 11.9 (53.4) | 12.8 (55.0) | 15.1 (59.2) | 18.9 (66.0) | 22.4 (72.3) | 25.0 (77.0) | 25.7 (78.3) | 25.4 (77.7) | 24.4 (75.9) | 21.4 (70.5) | 17.9 (64.2) | 13.8 (56.8) | 19.6 (67.2) |
| Record low °C (°F) | 3.2 (37.8) | 3.7 (38.7) | 4.1 (39.4) | 9.2 (48.6) | 16.1 (61.0) | 18.5 (65.3) | 21.9 (71.4) | 21.3 (70.3) | 18.3 (64.9) | 11.9 (53.4) | 7.7 (45.9) | 1.5 (34.7) | 1.5 (34.7) |
| Average precipitation mm (inches) | 28.0 (1.10) | 42.5 (1.67) | 71.9 (2.83) | 152.8 (6.02) | 223.8 (8.81) | 369.7 (14.56) | 283.6 (11.17) | 328.3 (12.93) | 169.1 (6.66) | 35.0 (1.38) | 36.5 (1.44) | 31.7 (1.25) | 1,772.9 (69.82) |
| Average precipitation days (≥ 0.1 mm) | 5.3 | 7.4 | 9.2 | 10.8 | 13.9 | 17.1 | 13.9 | 15.6 | 9.7 | 4.3 | 4.5 | 5.2 | 116.9 |
| Average relative humidity (%) | 73 | 77 | 78 | 81 | 84 | 87 | 84 | 85 | 80 | 73 | 73 | 71 | 79 |
| Mean monthly sunshine hours | 151.3 | 118.0 | 118.2 | 128.1 | 156.6 | 173.0 | 238.1 | 211.2 | 204.8 | 213.5 | 178.0 | 161.9 | 2,052.7 |
| Percentage possible sunshine | 45 | 37 | 32 | 34 | 38 | 43 | 58 | 53 | 56 | 60 | 54 | 49 | 47 |
Source: China Meteorological Administration

== Transportation ==
Huilai Station (惠來站) is the only intermediate station of the Shantou–Shanwei Railway (汕汕鐵路) within Jieyang, and it serves as the origin station for passenger services on the Jieyang–Huilai Railway. It is located south of Donglong Village (東隴村) in Donglong Town (東隴鎮), Huilai County, approximately 500 meters from the village and 3 kilometers from the county seat. The station opened on December 26, 2023, simultaneously with the completion and inauguration of the Shantou–Shanwei Railway. During peak periods, it is expected to handle up to 1,200 passengers per hour.
