= Wanxiang =

Chinese company

Wanxiang Group Corporation

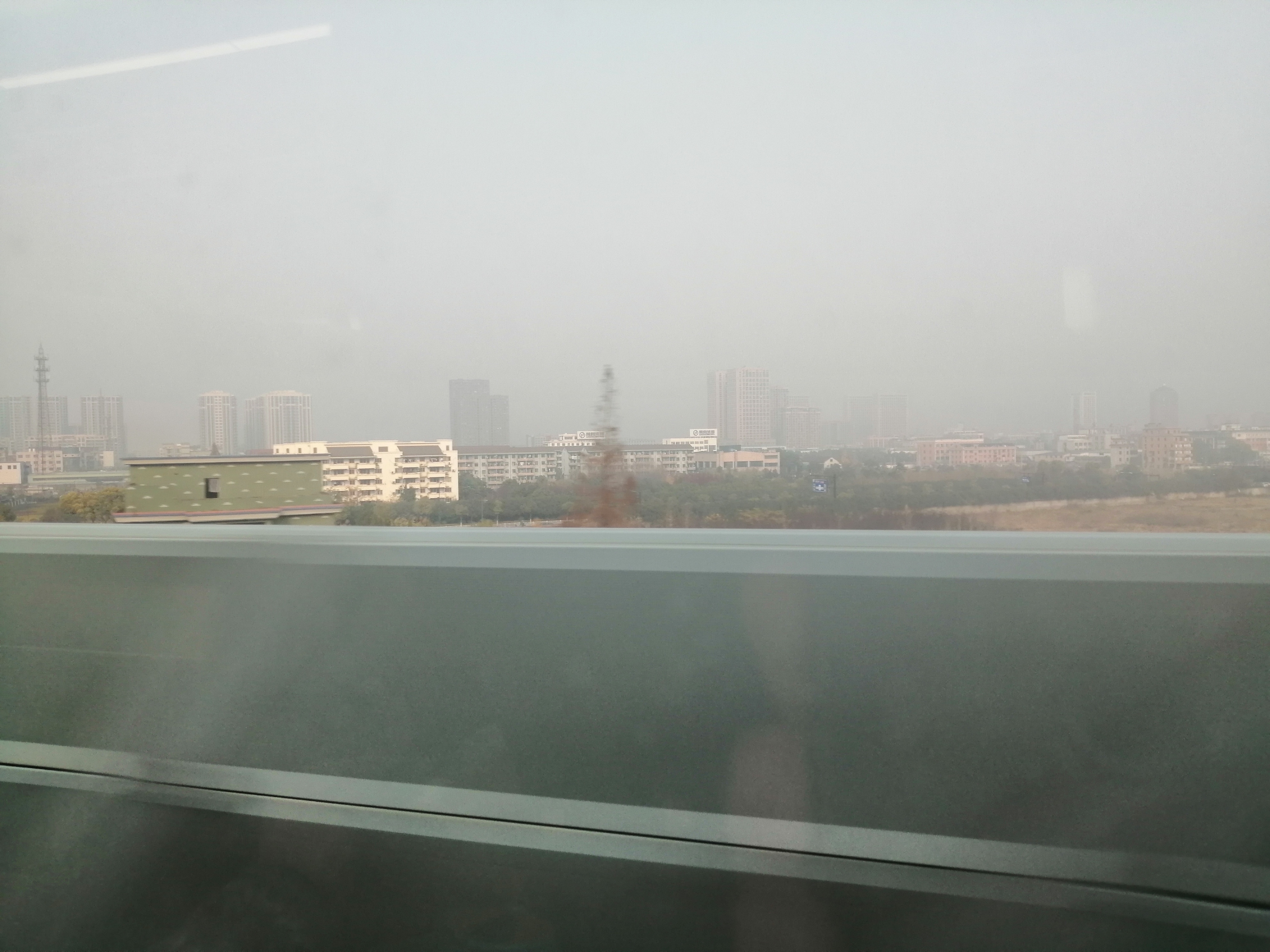
- Headquarters of Wanxiang Group
- Industry: Automotive
- Founded: 1969; 57 years ago
- Founder: Lu Guanqiu
- Headquarters: Hangzhou, Zhejiang, China
- Area served: Worldwide
- Key people: Mr. Weiding Lu (Chief Executive Officer); Pin Ni (President) ? (Chairman)
- Products: Automotive components
- Revenue: 112.1 Billion Renminbi
- Subsidiaries: List: Transportation: Karma Automotive Industrial: A123 Systems International: Wanxiang America Inc.
- Website: www.wanxiang.com.cn

Wanxiang Group Corporation (Chinese: 万向集团) is a Chinese multinational conglomerate, headquartered in Hangzhou, Zhejiang province, China. Its automotive components subsidiary (Wangxiang Qiaochao) is the largest China-based automotive components company measured by revenues. The company was founded in 1969 by Lu Guanqiu.

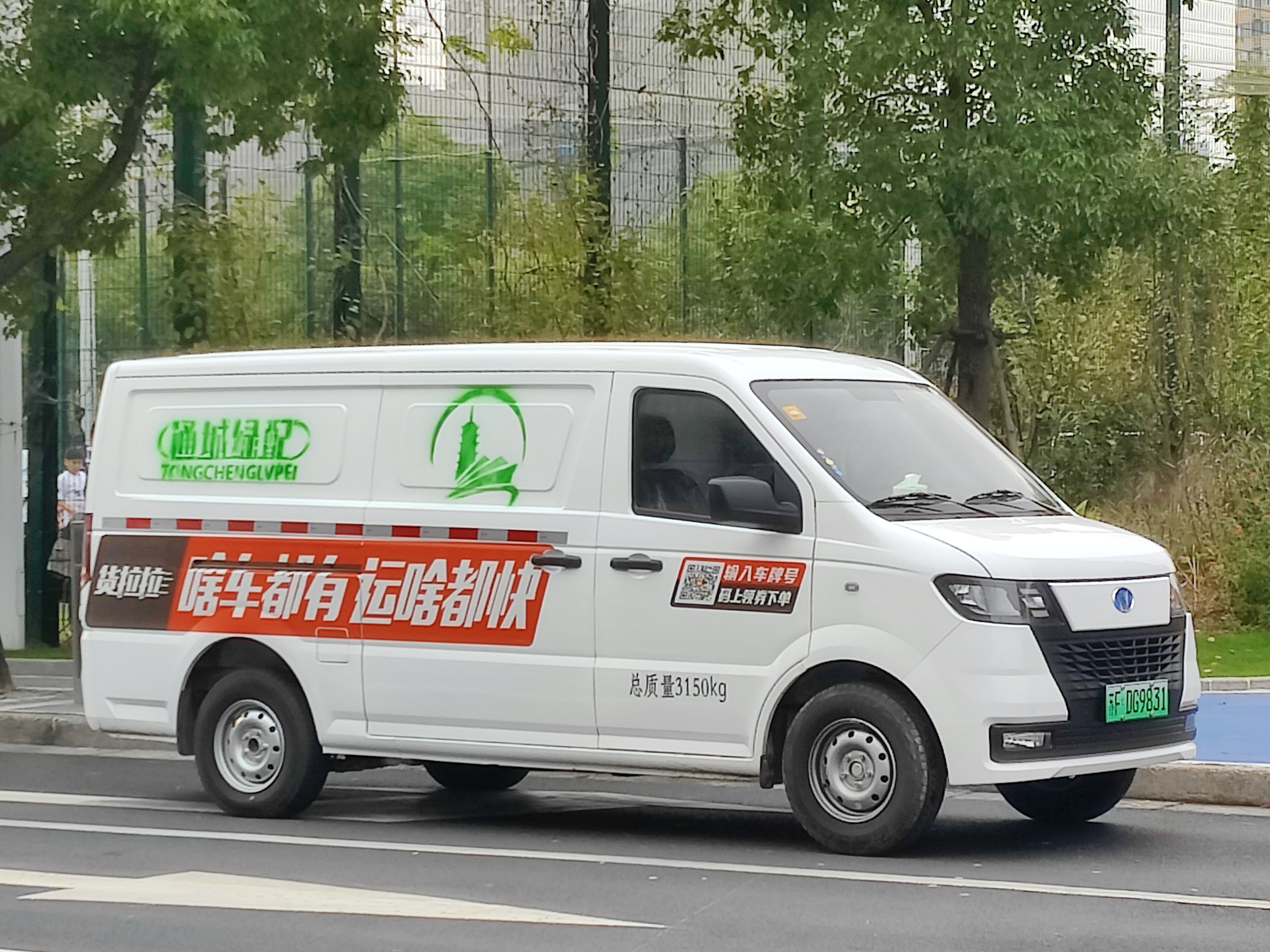
Wanxiang T01

== History ==
The company was formerly known as the Ningwei Commune Agricultural Machinery Repair Factory in Xiaoshan County, Zhejiang Province, which was taken over by Lu Guanqiu and mainly produced universal joints.

In 1990, it became a separately planned group in Zhejiang Province. In 1997, it became one of the 120 pilot enterprise groups of the State Council. In 1999, it was listed as one of the 520 key enterprises in the country and won the first China Industrial Award.

On December 10, 2012, Wanxiang America Corp. successfully acquired the assets of bankrupt U.S. battery manufacturer A123 Systems for nearly $260 million. On February 16, 2014, Wanxiang America Corp. successfully acquired the bankrupt assets of Fisker Automotive, a plug-in hybrid sports car manufacturer in the United States, for approximately US$149.2 million, including US$126.2 million in cash and US$8 million in assumed debt.

== Subsidiaries ==
=== Wangxiang Qianchao Co., Ltd. ===
Wangxiang Qiaochao Co., Ltd. is a public company listed on Shenzhen Stock Exchange (Symbol 000559).

=== A123 Systems, LLC ===
On October 16, 2012, A123 Systems had filed for bankruptcy protection under Chapter 11, Title 11, United States Code. Wanxiang won an auction for the bankrupt United States-based lithium-ion battery maker in December 2012 for a closing price of US$256.6 million. A123 Systems had more than 3000 employees as of that date.

The Committee on Foreign Investment in the United States (CFIUS) granted its approval, and on January 28, 2013, Wanxiang Group's Chicago-based subsidiary, Wanxiang America, purchased the preponderance of A123's assets out of bankruptcy for US$256.6 million and organized a new company, similarly named A123Systems, LLC.

=== Karma Automotive ===
Wanxiang received U.S. bankruptcy court approval on February 18, 2014, to buy the assets of Fisker Automotive, a manufacturer of plug-in hybrid sports cars which was declared bankrupt in November 2013. Wanxiang's American subsidiary won a three-day auction with a bid of US$149.2 million. Bidding had started at US$55 million. The company said in court papers that it could restart production in the coming months, estimating that it would sell more than 1,000 Fisker Karma cars in the first 18 months in the U.S. and 500 in Europe. The automotive company was renamed to Karma Automotive, and their car was renamed Revero.

=== SAIC Wanxiang New Energy Coach Co., Ltd. ===
SAIC Motor Corporation and Wanxiang Group have set up a 49%-51% joint venture, known as SAIC Wanxiang New Energy Coach Co., Ltd. and acquired the license to manufacture vehicles in July 2015. The joint-venture plans to produce its first new alternative fueled coach after granted with license plates by Chinese authorities after a few years of operation.

== See also ==
- Automotive industry in China
