= Haimen, Guangdong =

Haimen 海门镇
- Town
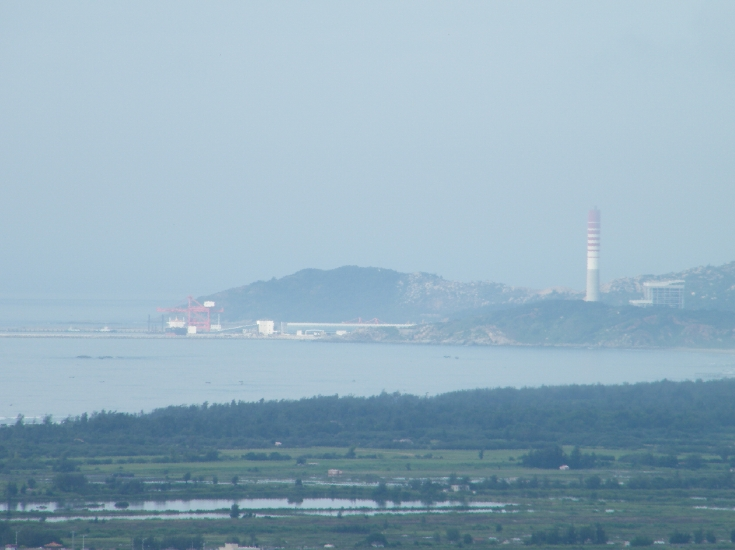
- Haimen Harbour and its adjacent power plant

- Location in Guangdong
- Coordinates: 23°11′36″N 116°37′01″E
- Country: People's Republic of China
- Province: Guangdong
- Prefecture-level city: Shantou
- District: Chaoyang

Area
  - Total: 38.5 km^{2} (14.9 sq mi)
  - Land: 27.8 km^{2} (10.7 sq mi)
  - Water: 10.7 km^{2} (4.1 sq mi)

Population (2005)
  - Total: 114,300
  - Density: 4,110/km^{2} (10,600/sq mi)
- Time zone: UTC+8 (China Standard)
- Area code: 0754

Haimen (simplified Chinese: 海门; traditional Chinese: 海門; pinyin: Hǎimén; lit. 'sea gate') is a town of Chaoyang District, Shantou, in the east of Guangdong province, China, and is situated on the South China Sea coast. It administers 16 villages, and in 2005, it had a population of about 114,300 residing in a total area of 38.5 km^{2} (14.9 sq mi), although 10.7 km^{2} (4.1 sq mi) of it is ocean. In December 2011, it was the site of protests where thousands of demonstrators spoke out over plans to expand a coal-fired power plant in the town.
