= Swatow dialect =

Dialect of Teochew Min

- Shantou
- 汕頭話 Suan¹tao⁵ uê⁷
- Native to: China
- Region: Mainly in Shantou, southeastern Guangdong province.
- Language family: Sino-Tibetan: Sinitic; Chinese; Min; Coastal Min; Southern Min; Teochew Min; Swatow dialect
- Early forms: Proto-Sino-Tibetan: Old Chinese (Note: Min is believed to have split from Old Chinese, rather than Middle Chinese like other varieties of Chinese.); Proto-Min
- Writing system: Chinese characters

Language codes
- ISO 639-3: –
- Glottolog: shan1244
- Linguasphere: 79-AAA-jif
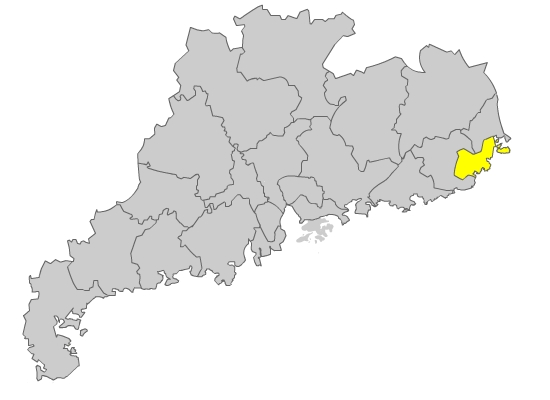
- Swatow dialect

The Swatow dialect, also known as the Shantou dialect, is a variety of Chinese mostly spoken in Shantou in Guangdong, China. It is typically classified in the Northern Teochew group of dialects, and is regarded as the representative dialect of Teochew Min.

== History ==
Although numerous Romanized materials labeled as "Swatow dialect" were produced from the nineteenth to the early twentieth century, their phonological systems actually reflected the dialect of the prefectural city of Chaozhou. The modern Swatow dialect did not take shape until the 1940s. As a modern emerging city, Swatow's residents were mainly immigrants from various parts of the Chaoshan region and their descendants. Between the establishment of Swatow as a city in 1921 and 1934, a large influx of immigrants increased the population from 60,000 to 193,000, with an average annual growth of 10,000. Thereafter, population growth slowed, and the various dialects began to merge, gradually developing into a stable phonological system. By around 1946, the present-day phonological system of the Swatow dialect had already taken shape and come to be regarded as the norm.

== Phonology ==
Swatow dialect has 18 initials, 91 rimes, and 8 tones.

=== Initials ===
		Bilabial	Alveolar		Velar	Glottal
		Bilabial	plain	sibilant	Velar	Glottal
Nasal		/m/ 毛	/n/ 腦		/ŋ/ 俄	
Plosive/ Affricate	tenuis	/p/ 波	/t/ 刀	/ts/ 之	/k/ 哥	/ʔ/ 烏
Plosive/ Affricate	aspirated	/pʰ/ 抱	/tʰ/ 天	/tsʰ/ 此	/kʰ/ 戈	
Plosive/ Affricate	voiced	/b/ 無			/g/ 鵝	
Continuant	voiceless			/s/ 思		
Continuant	voiced		/l/ 羅	/z/ 入		/h/ 何

=== Rimes ===
Swatow dialect has at least the following rimes:

Nucleus		-a-			-ɛ̝-		-o̞-		-ɯ-	-i-	-u-	-ai-		-au-		-oi-	-ou-	-ui-	-iu-	∅-
Medial		∅-	i-	u-	∅-	u-	∅-	i-	∅-	∅-	∅-	∅-	u-	∅-	i-	∅-	∅-	∅-	∅-	∅-
Coda	-∅	a 亞	ia 呀	ua 娃	e 啞	ue 鍋	o 窩	io 腰	ɯ 余	i 衣	u 污	ai 哀	uai 歪	au 歐	iau 夭	oi 鞋	ou 烏	ui 威	iu 憂	
Coda	-◌̃	ã 噯	ĩã 營	ũã 鞍	ẽ 楹	ũẽ 橫		ĩõ 羊	ɯ̃ 秧	ĩ 丸		ãĩ 愛	ũãĩ 檨			õĩ 閑			ĩũ 幼	
Coda	-ʔ	aʔ 鴨	iaʔ 益	uaʔ 呴	eʔ 厄	ueʔ 襪	oʔ 學	ioʔ 約		iʔ 裂	uʔ 呴					oiʔ 狹				
Coda	-m	am 庵	iam 淹	uam 犯						im 音										m̩ 唔
Coda	-ŋ	aŋ 按	iaŋ 央	uaŋ 汪	eŋ 英		oŋ 翁	ioŋ 雍	ɯŋ 恩	iŋ 因	uŋ 溫									ŋ̍ 䘼
Coda	-p	ap 盒	iap 壓	uap 法						ip 邑										
Coda	-k	ak 惡	iak 躍	uak 獲	ek 液		ok 屋	iok 育		ik 乙	uk 熨									

=== Tones ===
Tones	dark 陰				light 陽			
Tones	level 平	rising 上	departing 去	entering 入	level 平	rising 上	departing 去	entering 入
No.	1	2	3	4	5	6	7	8
Tone contour	˧ (33)	˥˧ (53)	˨˩˧ (213)	˨ (2)	˥ (55)	˧˥ (35)	˧˩ (31)	˥ (5)
Example Hanzi	詩	死	四	薛	時	是	示	蝕

==== Tone sandhi ====
Swatow dialect has extremely extensive tone sandhi rules: in an utterance, only the last syllable pronounced is not affected by the rules. The two-syllable tonal sandhi rules are shown in the table below:

Tone sandhi of first syllable
Original citation tone	1	2	3	4	5	6	7	8
Original citation tone	˧ (33)	˥˧ (53)	˨˩˧ (213)	˨ (2)	˥ (55)	˧˥ (35)	˧˩ (31)	˥ (5)
Tone sandhi	1	6	2	8	7/9	7		4
Tone sandhi	˧ (33)	˨˦ (24)	˥˧ (53)	˥ (5)	˧˩ (31) / ˨ (22) (Note: In the newer variety, the light level tone has the same sandhi as the light rising and departing tone. In the older variety, however, its sandhi is 22.)	˧˩ (31)		˨ (2)
