= Chaonan, Shantou =

Chaonan 潮南区
- District
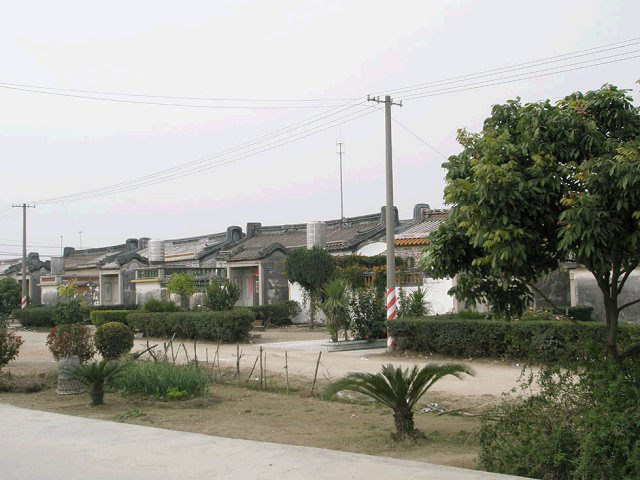

- Location of Chaonan in Shantou

- Location in Guangdong
- Coordinates: 23°13′18″N 116°26′35″E
- Country: People's Republic of China
- Province: Guangdong
- Prefecture-level city: Shantou

Area
  - Total: 596.42 km^{2} (230.28 sq mi)

Population (2020)
  - Total: 1,231,638
  - Density: 2,065.1/km^{2} (5,348.5/sq mi)
- Time zone: UTC+8 (China Standard)

Chaonan (Chinese: 潮南; pinyin: Cháonán) is a district of Shantou, Guangdong province. It is located on the eastern coast of Guangdong Province and southwest of Shantou City, The District People's Government is located on Yuxia South Road, Xiashan Street.

The District includes the Xiashan Subdistrict (峡山街道) and the towns of Jingdu (井都镇), Longtian (陇田镇), Leiling (雷岭镇), Chengtian (成田镇), Hongchang (红场镇), Lugang (胪岗镇), Liangying (两英镇), Xiancheng (仙城镇), Chendian (陈店镇), and Simapu (司马浦镇).

== Topography and landforms ==
Chaonan District is a coastal plain-hilly area, with a terrain sloping from southwest to northeast. The topographic characteristics are "one mountain, one river and one plain".

== Climate ==
Chaonan District belongs to the southern subtropical monsoon climate zone, with obvious maritime climate, no scorching heat in summer, no severe cold in winter, long summer and short winter, sufficient sunshine, abundant rainfall, and evergreen in all seasons.

== Transportation ==
=== Synthesis ===
Chaonan District has initially formed a large traffic pattern of "one high-speed railway, four highways, two national highways and five provincial highways".

=== Railway ===
Chaonan Station is located in Tiansan Village, Longtian Town, Chaonan District, and will be officially opened for operation on December 26, 2023, and is one of the stations of the Shantou South to Shanwei section of the Shantou High-speed Railway.

== Population ==
As of November 1, 2020, the permanent population of Chaonan District in the seventh census was 1,231,638.
