= Automotive Executive of the Year Award =

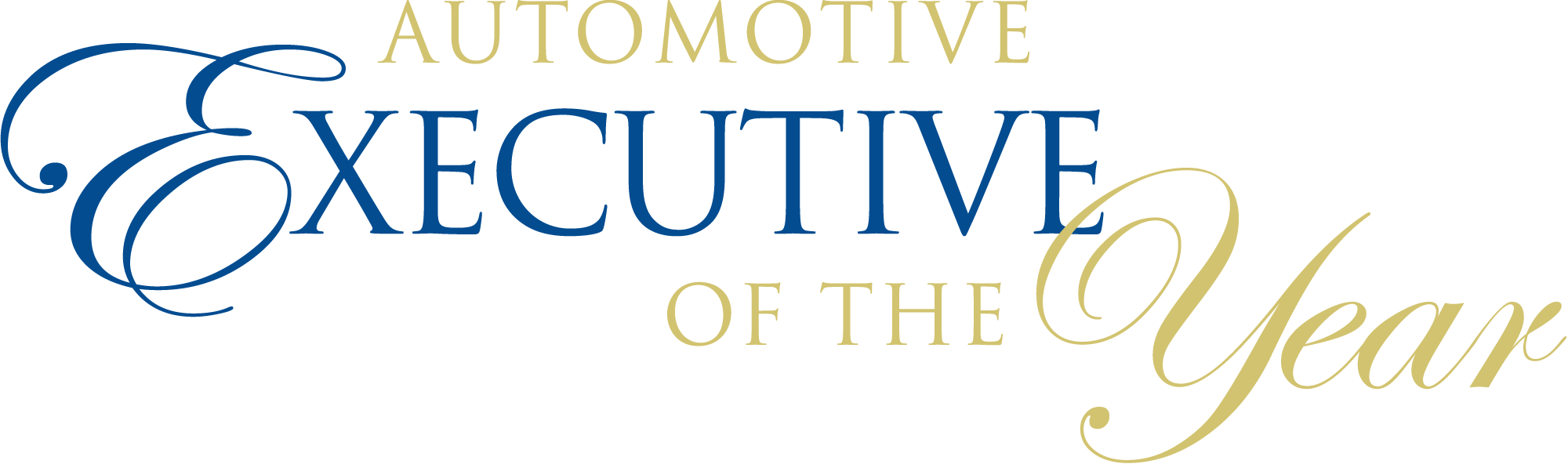
- Awarded for: Excellence in leadership and innovation within the automotive industry
- Venue: Detroit Athletic Club
- Country: United States
- First award: 1964; 62 years ago

The DNV GL - Automotive Executive of the Year Award recognizes excellence in leadership and innovation within the automotive industry. Since being launched in 1964, the award has been given to top auto executives, including: Marco Mattiacci (2012), Alan Mulally (2011), Elon Musk (2010), James O'Sullivan (2009), Carroll Shelby (2008), Jim Press (2007), Bill Ford (2006), Dieter Zetsche (2003), Rick Wagoner (2001), Jac Nasser (1999), Robert Eaton (1997), Thomas Stallkamp (1996), Roger Smith (1984), Lee Iacocca (1983), Bob Lund (1980), Henry Ford II (1973) and John DeLorean (1972).

Each honoree is nominated by an Advisory Committee of automotive journalists, representatives from the supplier community and industry analysts. Automotive Executive of the Year nomination criteria include entrepreneurial and creative thinking, exemplary leadership and professional integrity. Nominations are not directly linked to company performance or individual popularity. In some cases, the Advisory Committee may elect to give a Lifetime Achievement Award, honoring cumulative innovation and leadership.

The Automotive Executive of the Year Award is presented to an annual honoree during an invitation-only luncheon held at the Detroit Athletic Club in downtown Detroit, Mich. The historic DAC has served as the event venue since 1964.

Each honoree is presented with the DNV Navigator Award, an authentic working brass nautical compass (approximately 10 x 10 inches) enclosed in a teak wood box. The compass symbolizes the significance of navigation throughout the challenges of industry leadership. In addition, honorees are presented with an original watercolor portrait created by Michigan artist, Werner Claussen.

== Award ownership ==
The award has been owned by DNV GL since its purchase in 2006. DNV GL - Business Assurance is a global services provider for management system certification to TS 16949, ISO 9001 and ISO 14001, and other national and international standards. Other services include training, hospital accreditation, food safety certification, product certification and climate change services.

== Award recipients ==
The following partial list gives a history of recipients of the award.

Year	Recipient	Title	Organization
2012	Marco Mattiacci	CEO	Ferrari North America
2011	Alan Mulally	President and CEO	Ford Motor Company
2010	Elon Musk	CEO and Product Architect	Tesla, Inc.
2009	Jim O' Sullivan	President and CEO, North American Operations	Mazda Motor Corporation
2008	Carroll Shelby	Founder	Shelby American, Inc.
2007	Jim Press	President	Toyota Motor North America, Inc.
2006	William Clay Ford, Jr.	Chairman and CEO	Ford Motor Company
2005	Trevor Creed	Senior Vice President	Chrysler Group
2004	Gary L. Cowger	President, North America	General Motors
2003	Dieter Zetsche	President and CEO	Chrysler Group
2002	Carlos Ghosn	President and CEO	Nissan Motor Co., Ltd.
2001	Rick Wagoner	President and CEO	General Motors
2000	Tom Gale	Executive Vice President, Chrysler, Plymouth, Jeep, Dodge	DaimlerChrysler Corporation
1999	Jacques Nasser	President and CEO	Ford Motor Company
1998	Nobuhiko Kawamoto	President and CEO	Honda Motor Co., Ltd.
1997	Bob Eaton	Chairman and President	Chrysler Corporation
1996	Thomas Stallkamp	Executive Vice President, Procurement and Supply	Chrysler Corporation
1995	Bernd Pischetsrieder	Chairman of the Board	BMW AG
1994	Bob Lutz	President and CEO	Chrysler Corporation
1993	J. Ignacio Lopez	Group Vice President, Worldwide Purchasing	General Motors
1992	Carl Hahn	Chairman of the Board	Volkswagen AG
1991	John F. Smith, Jr.	Vice Chairman, International Operations	General Motors
1990	Tadashi Kume	President and CEO	Honda Motor Co., Ltd.
1989	Jack Telnack	Vice President, Design	Ford Motor Company
1988	Harold Poling	Vice Chairman and CEO	Ford Motor Company
1987	Lewis Veraldi	Vice President, Car Product Development	Ford Motor Company
1986	Kenichi Yamamoto	President	Mazda Motor Corporation
1985	Phillip Caldwell	Chairman of the Board and CEO	Ford Motor Company
1984	Roger B. Smith	Chairman of the Board and CEO	General Motors
1983	Lee Iacocca	Chairman	Chrysler Corporation
1982	Donald Petersen	President and CEO	Ford Motor Company
1981	Donald H. McPherson	Vice President and Group Executive	General Motors
1980	Robert D. Lund	General Manager, Chevrolet Division	General Motors
1979	Elliot M. Estes	President and CEO	General Motors
1978	William O. Bourke	Executive Vice President, North American Operations	Ford Motor Company
1977	Thomas Murphy	Chairman of the Board	General Motors
1976	Dick Teague	Vice President, Styling	American Motors Corporation
1975	John B. Naughton	Vice President, Sales Group, North American Operations	Ford Motor Company
1974	William V. Luneburg	President and CEO	American Motors Corporation
1973	Henry Ford II	Chairman of the Board	Ford Motor Company
1972	John DeLorean	General Manager, Chevrolet Division	General Motors
1971	Lee Iacocca	President, North American Operations	Ford Motor Company
1970	George Russell	Vice President	General Motors
1969	Semon Knudsen	President	Ford Motor Company
1968	Harry F. Barr	Vice President of Engineering	General Motors
1967	James Roche	President	General Motors
1967	Harry E. Chesebrough	Vice President, Product Planning and Development	Chrysler Corporation
1967	John Bugas	Vice President and Consultant	Ford Motor Company
1966	George H. Love	Chairman of the Board	Chrysler Corporation
1966	Lynn A. Townsend	President	Chrysler Corporation
1966	Virgil Boyd	Group Vice President	Chrysler Corporation
1965	Ed Cole	Vice President and Group Executive	General Motors
1964	Charles H. Patterson	Executive Vice President	Ford Motor Company

== See also ==
- List of motor vehicle awards
