= History of Chrysler =

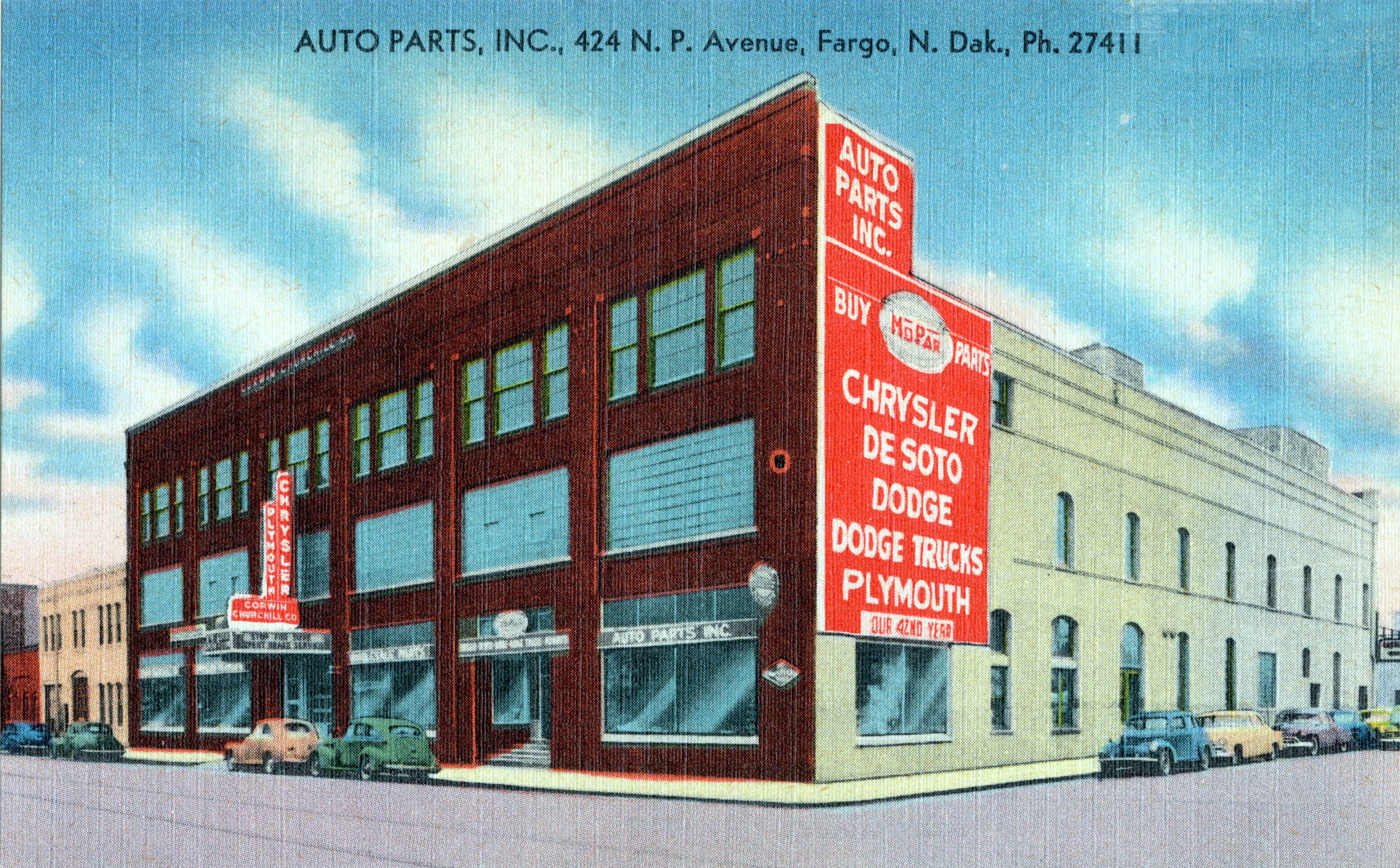
Dealership, offering Chrysler, DeSoto, Dodge (Trucks), Plymouth and Mopar parts (c. 1930–1945) at 424 North P. Avenue, Fargo, North Dakota

Chrysler, a large automobile manufacturer, was founded in the 1920s and continues under the name Stellantis North America. Its history involves engineering innovations, high finance, wide alternations of profits and losses, various mergers and acquisitions, and multinationalization.

== History ==
=== Origins ===
Chrysler was founded by Walter Chrysler on June 6, 1925, when the Maxwell Motor Company (est. 1904) was re-organized into the Chrysler Corporation.

Walter Chrysler had originally arrived at the ailing Maxwell-Chalmers company in the early 1920s, having been hired to take over and overhaul the company's troubled operations just after a similar rescue job at the Willys car company.

In late 1923, production of the Chalmers automobile was ended.

Then in January 1924, Walter Chrysler launched an eponymous automobile. The Chrysler 70 (also called the B-70) was a 6-cylinder automobile, designed to provide customers with an advanced, well-engineered car at a more affordable price than they might expect. Elements of this car are traceable back to a prototype which had been under development at Willys at the time Chrysler was there.

==== Engineering innovations ====
The original 1924 Chrysler included a carburetor air filter, high-compression engine, full pressure lubrication inside the engine, and an oil filter, at a time when most autos came without all these features. Among the innovations in its early years would be the first practical mass-produced four-wheel hydraulic brakes, a system nearly completely engineered by Chrysler with patents assigned to Lockheed. Chrysler pioneered rubber engine mounts to reduce vibration; Oilite bearings; and superfinishing for shafts.

Chrysler also developed a road wheel with a ridged rim, designed to keep a deflated tire from flying off the wheel. This safety wheel was eventually adopted by the auto industry worldwide.

Following the introduction of the Chrysler, the Maxwell marque was dropped after the 1925 model year. The new, lower-priced 4-cylinder Chrysler introduced for 1926 year was a badge-engineered Maxwell. The advanced engineering and testing that went into Chrysler Corporation cars helped to push the company to the second-place position in U.S. sales by 1936, a position it would last hold in 1949.

==== Early models ====
- Chrysler 70
- Chrysler Touring

=== Vehicle marques ===
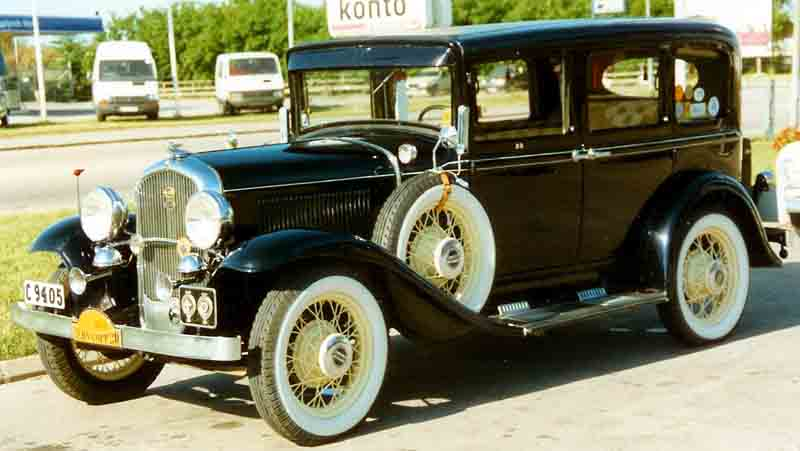
1931 Plymouth

In 1928, Chrysler Corporation began dividing its vehicle offerings by price class and function. The Plymouth brand was introduced at the low priced end of the market created essentially by once again reworking and rebadging Chrysler's 4-cylinder model. At the same time, the DeSoto marque was introduced in the medium-price field. Shortly thereafter, Chrysler bought the Dodge Brothers automobile and truck company and launched the Fargo range of trucks. By the late 1930s, the DeSoto and Dodge divisions would trade places in the corporate hierarchy. This proliferation of marques under Chrysler's umbrella might have been inspired by the similar strategy employed successfully by General Motors. Beginning in 1955, Imperial, formerly the top model of the Chrysler brand, became a separate make of its own, and in 1960, the Valiant was introduced likewise as a distinct marque. In the U.S. market, Valiant was made a model in the Plymouth line and the DeSoto make was discontinued for 1961. With those exceptions per applicable year and market, Chrysler's range from lowest to highest price from the 1940s through the 1970s was Valiant, Plymouth, Dodge, DeSoto, Chrysler, and Imperial. After acquiring AMC in 1987, Chrysler fulfilled one of AMC's conditions of sale by creating the Eagle marque in 1988 to be sold at existing AMC-Jeep dealers. The Eagle brand lasted a decade, being discontinued in 1998, while Plymouth was ended three years later.

By 2001 and as of September 2009, the company had three marques worldwide: Dodge, Jeep, and Chrysler. Effective October 2009, however, a fourth brand was established with the creation of the Ram brand, a breakout from the Dodge marque. Initially, the new brand consisted of the Ram full-size pickup, Dakota compact pickup and the Sprinter van. During the unveiling of Chrysler's business plan on November 5, CEO Sergio Marchionne indicated that the Ram brand will be augmented by Fiat-sourced vehicles, including a smaller van than the Sprinter, which itself would be replaced by a Fiat-based vehicle. In 2011, however, Fiat became Chrysler's fifth brand with the North American introduction of the Fiat 500.

=== Other marques ===
Mopar, AutoPar

MoPar oil filter, 1956–1962 design

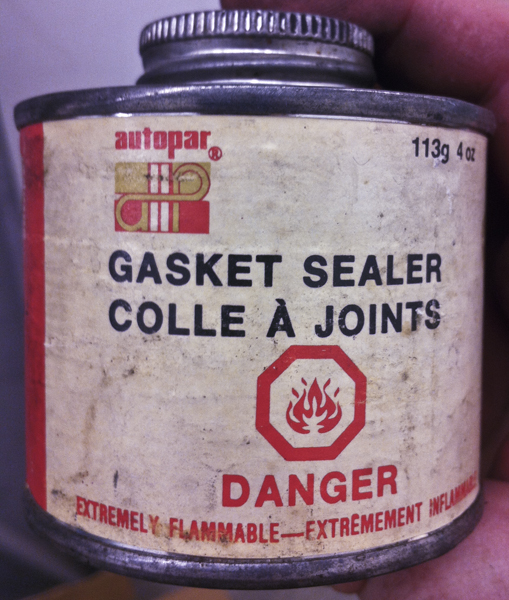
A tin of AutoPar-branded gasket sealer from the 1980s

==== MoPar, Chryco, AutoPar ====
In the 1930s, the company created a formal vehicle parts division under the MoPar brand (a portmanteau of Motor Parts), with the result that "Mopar" remains a colloquial term for vehicles produced by Chrysler Corporation.

The MoPar (later Mopar) brand was not used in Canada, where parts were sold under the Chryco and AutoPar brands, until the Mopar brand was phased into the Canadian market beginning in the late 1970s.

Many Chrysler Corporation vehicle parts also bore variants of the DPCD monogram, for Dodge-Plymouth-Chrysler-DeSoto, well after the 1961 end of DeSoto production.

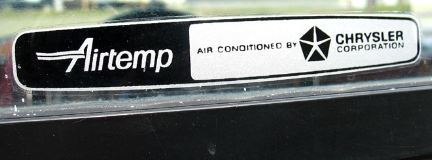
Airtemp logo on window of air conditioned Chrysler Corp. vehicle

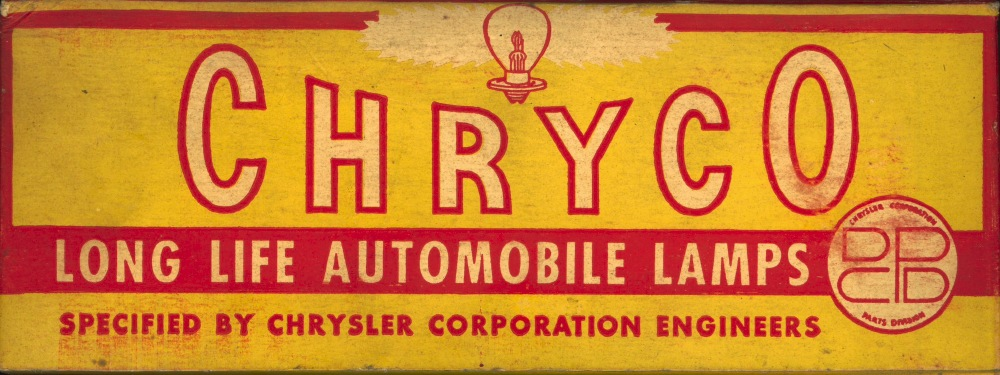
Canadian Chryco headlight bulb box from 1948; note circular DPCD logo

==== Airtemp ====
Chrysler's Airtemp marque for stationary and mobile air conditioning, refrigeration, and climate control was launched with the first installation in 1930's Chrysler Building. The Airtemp Corporation was incorporated in 1934 and it utilized a former Maxwell factory.

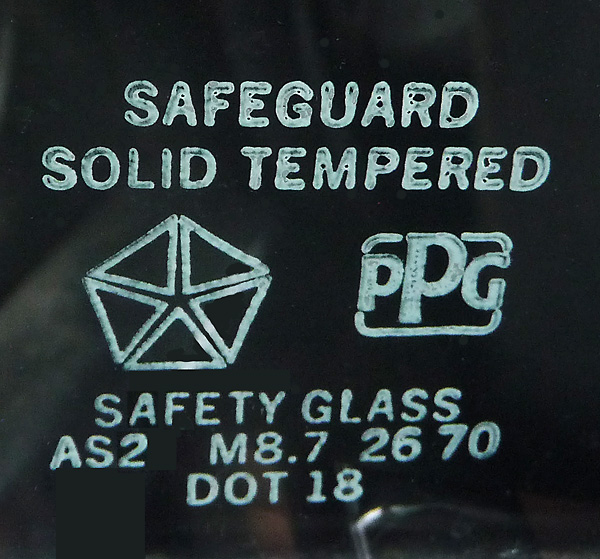
Safeguard brand on an automobile vent window made by PPG

Airtemp invented capacity regulators, sealed radial compressors, and the self-contained air conditioning system, along with a superior high-speed radial compressor, and by 1941 had over 500 dealers selling its air conditioning and heating systems. The company supplied medical refrigeration units in World War II, and dominated the industry in the 1940s but slowly fell behind. By the 1970s Airtemp was losing money and was sold to Fedders in 1976. In 2012 the name was reborn as a Nordyne byproduct exclusively sold by the R.E. Michel Company.

==== Acustar ====
In the 1980s, Chrysler formed a subsidiary business called Acustar to sell parts to other automakers as well as supplying parts for Chrysler-built vehicles, similar to General Motors' creation of Delphi Corporation and Ford's later creation of Visteon.

==== Safeguard ====
Safeguard is Chrysler's brand for original and replacement auto glass, much of which, from 1958 through the mid-2000s, was made at Chrysler's McGraw glass plant, and some of which was manufactured for Chrysler by established glass companies.

=== 1930s ===
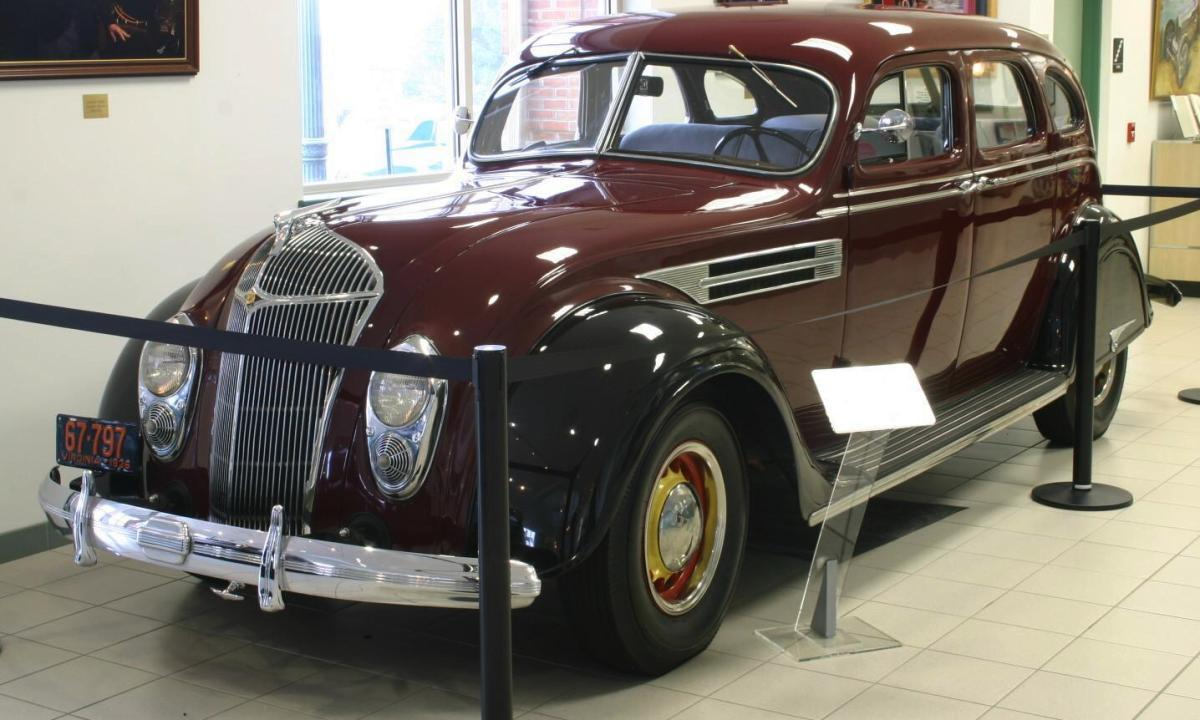
1936 Chrysler Airflow Series C-9

In 1934, the company introduced the Airflow models, featuring an advanced streamlined body, among the first to be designed using aerodynamic principles. Chrysler created the industry's first wind tunnel to develop them. Buyers rejected its styling, and the more conventionally designed Dodge and Plymouth cars pulled the firm through the Depression years. Plymouth was one of only a few marques that actually increased sales during the cash-strapped thirties.

The unsuccessful Airflow had a chilling effect on Chrysler styling and marketing, which remained determinedly conservative through the 1940s and into the 1950s, with the single exception of the installation of hidden headlights on the very brief production run of 1942 DeSotos. Engineering advances continued, and in 1951 the firm introduced the first of a long and famous series of Hemi V8s.

=== 1950s ===
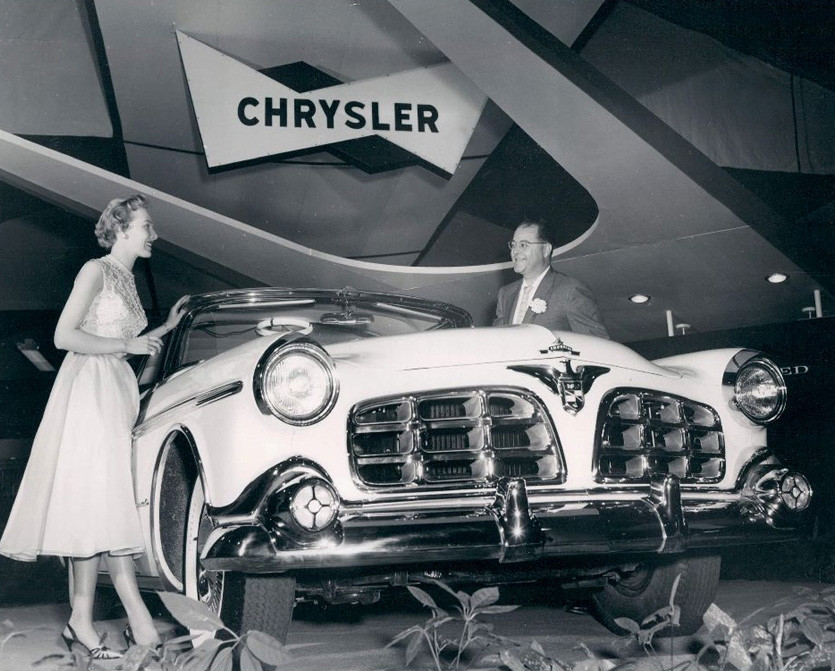
1955 Imperial car model shown on display at January 1955 Chicago Auto Show

1955 Chrysler - Philco all transistor car radio - "Breaking News" radio broadcast announcement.

In 1955, things brightened with the introduction of Virgil Exner's successful "100 Million Dollar Look", followed in 1956 by Chrysler's pioneering adoption of transistor radios in cars. On April 28, 1955, Chrysler and Philco had announced the development and production of the world's first all-transistor car radio. The Mopar model 914HR was developed and produced by Chrysler and Philco and was a $150.00 "option" on the 1956 Imperial automobile models. Philco was the company that had manufactured the all-transistor car radio Mopar model 914HR, starting in the fall of 1955 at its Sandusky, Ohio plant, for the Chrysler corporation. With the inauguration of the Forward Look cars for 1957, Torsion-Aire suspension was introduced. This was not air suspension but an indirect-acting, torsion-spring front suspension system that drastically reduced unsprung weight and shifted the car's center of gravity downward and rearward. This resulted in both a smoother ride and significantly improved handling. A rush to production of the 1957 models led to quality control problems, including poor body fit and finish, resulting in significant and early rusting. This, coupled with a national recession, found the company again in recovery mode.

On September 28, 1957, Chrysler announced the production of electronic fuel injection (EFI) to be available as an option on some of its new 1958 car models (Chrysler 300D, Dodge D500, DeSoto Adventurer, Plymouth Golden Commando V-8) that resulted in approximately 35 total installations. Chrysler used the same all-transistor modulator "Electrojector" fuel injection system from Bendix Corporation that was withdrawn from public sale of the 1957 Rambler Rebel by American Motors because the system could not be made reliable. Owners of EFI Chryslers were so dissatisfied that all but one were retrofitted with carburetors, while that one has been completely restored, with original EFI electronic problems resolved.

=== Government programs in World War II ===
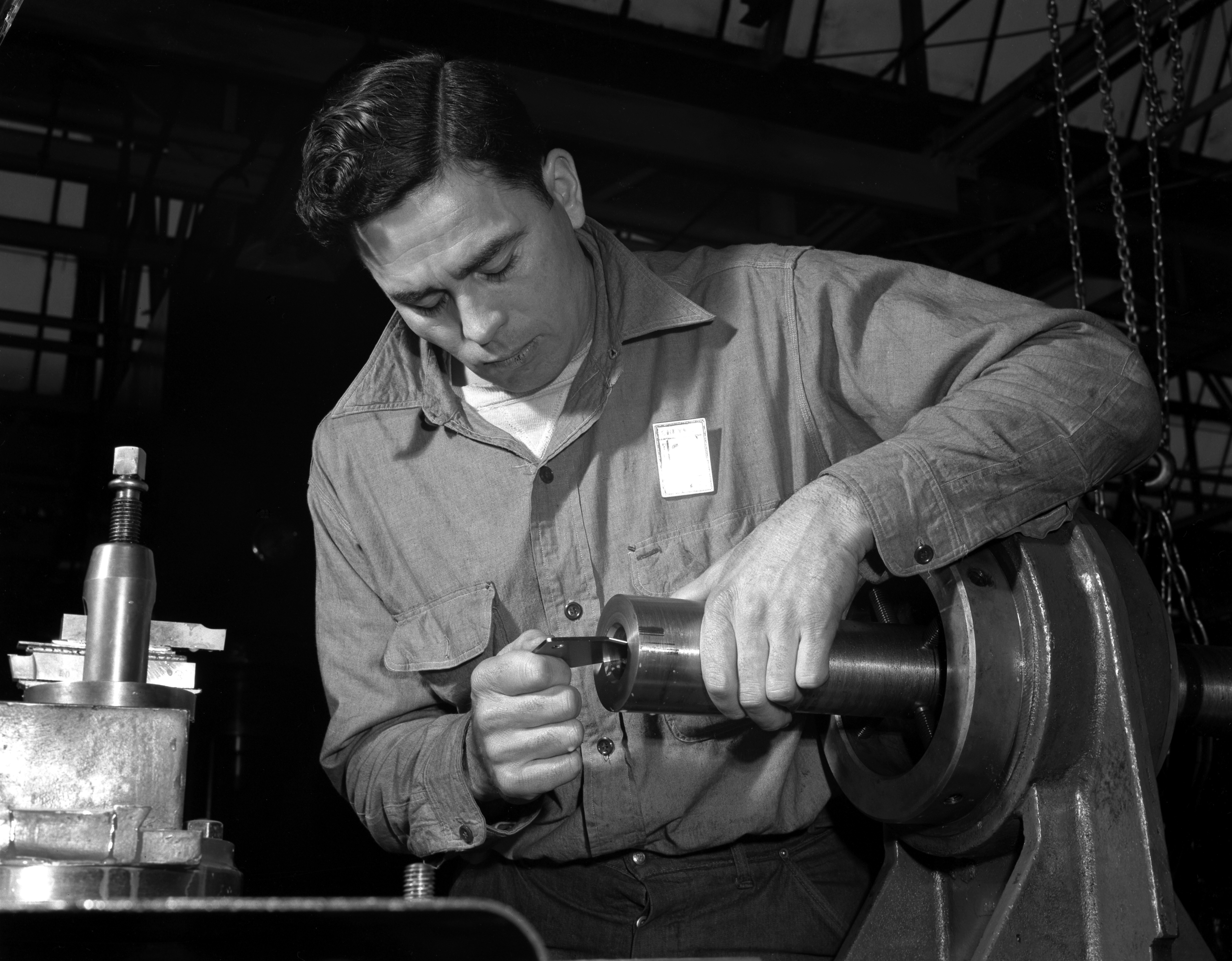
An inspector is examining the size of the bore in a 40mm anti-aircraft gun barrel. Chrysler Corporation, Highland Park, Detroit, 1942

==== Vehicles and systems ====
External videos
- Chrysler / Dodge U.S. war production film
- World War II Chrysler / Dodge stock film on Periscope Archives. Made by Chrysler / Dodge during WW II, the film shows various trucks, command cars, ambulances; the Chrysler foundry at the 4:30 mark, mass-producing Sherman tanks; the high-precision Sperry Gyrocompass (at 8 min); anti-aircraft guns, radar systems, and more.

During World War II, essentially all of Chrysler's facilities were devoted to building military vehicles and systems. Chrysler ranked eighth among United States corporations in the value of wartime production contracts. Chrysler made the converters for the Manhattan Project's K-25 gaseous diffusion plant in their Lynch Road plant in Detroit, after Dr Carl Heussner of the Chrysler plating laboratory solved the nickel plating problem.

==== Radar antennas ====
One of Chrysler's most significant contributions to the war effort was not in the field of vehicles but in design and manufacture of the components of radar systems. The Radiation Laboratory at MIT, established in 1941 to develop microwave radars, developed the SCR-584, the most widely recognized radar system of the war era. This system included a parabolic antenna six feet in diameter that was mechanically aimed in a helical pattern (round and round as well as up and down).

For the final production design of this antenna and its highly complex drive mechanism, the Army's Signal Corps Laboratories turned to Chrysler's Central Engineering Office. There, the parabola was changed from aluminum to steel, allowing production forming using standard automotive presses. To keep weight down, 6,000 equally spaced holed were drilled in the face (this did not affect the radiation pattern). The drive mechanism was completely redesigned, using technology derived from Chrysler's research in automotive gears and differentials. The changes resulted in improved performance, reduced weight, and easier maintenance. A large portion of the Dodge plant was used to build 1,500 of the SCR-584 antennas as well as the vans needed for the system.

=== Postwar government programs ===
After the war, Chrysler continued with special projects for the U.S. government. These were in the aerospace fields of missiles and space boosters.

==== Missiles ====
In April 1950, the U.S. Army established the Ordnance Guided Missile Center (OGMC) at Redstone Arsenal, adjacent to Huntsville, Alabama. To form OGMC, about 1,000 civilian and military personnel were transferred from Fort Bliss, Texas. Included was a group of German scientists and engineers led by Wernher von Braun; this group had been brought to America under Project Paperclip. OGMC designed the Army's first short-range ballistic missile, the PGM-11 Redstone, based on the WWII German V-2 missile. Chrysler established the Missile Division to serve as the Redstone prime contractor, setting up an engineering operation in Huntsville and for production obtaining use from the U.S. Navy of a large plant in Warren, Michigan. The Redstone was in active service from 1958 to 1964; it was also the first missile to test-launch a live nuclear weapon, first detonated in a 1958 test in the South Pacific.

Working together, the Missile Division and von Braun's team greatly increased the capability of the Redstone, resulting in the PGM-19 Jupiter, a medium-range ballistic missile. In May 1959, a Jupiter missiles launched two small monkeys into space in a nose cone on a Jupiter; this was America's first successful flight and recovery of live space payloads. Responsibility for deploying Jupiter missiles was transferred from the Army to the Air Force; armed with nuclear warheads, they were first deployed in Italy and Turkey during the early 1960s.

In October 1950, K. T. Keller the president and chairman of the board of Chrysler was appointed part-time Director of Guided Missiles by President Truman to "make sense" of the missile program. Kenneth Nichols, who had worked with him on the Manhattan Project, was his assistant. They were to select missiles to be put into production and specify the number required and give more priority to air defense missiles. The process of authorizing came to be known as "Kellerizing", and once when the Navy objected to numbers lower than they desired being specified for their missile, Keller refused to accept the Navy letter. He sent it back, saying he was willing to discuss the numbers but refused to reply in writing and get into the "Pentagon paper mill procedure" of "endless reviews and letter writing". He resigned in September 1953.

==== Space boosters ====
In July 1959, NASA chose the Redstone missile as the basis for the Mercury-Redstone Launch Vehicle to be used for suborbital test flights of the Project Mercury spacecraft. Three uncrewed MLRV launch attempts were made between November 1960 and March 1961, two of which were successful. The MLRV successfully launched the chimpanzee Ham and astronauts Alan Shepard and Gus Grissom on three suborbital flights in January, May and July 1961.

As America's crewed space flight plans became more ambitious, Wernher von Braun's team designed the Saturn family of launch vehicles. With Chrysler's Huntsville operation then designated the Space Division, Chrysler became Marshall Space Flight Center’s prime contractor for the first (booster) stage of the Saturn I and Saturn IB vehicles. The Saturn I booster stage was designated S-I, which was upgraded to the S-IB for the Saturn IB. Chrysler based its fuel tank design on a cluster of its Redstone and Jupiter tanks, using four Redstone tanks to hold the RP-1 fuel and four to hold the liquid oxygen (LOX) oxidizer, around a central Jupiter LOX tank. Chrysler built these for the Apollo program in the Michoud Assembly Facility in East New Orleans, one of the largest manufacturing plants in the world.

Between October 1961 and July 1965, NASA launched four S-I boosters with dummy upper stages on suborbital test flights, followed by six complete Saturn Is on uncrewed orbital flights. The last five of these tested boilerplate Apollo spacecraft, and the last three also carried Pegasus micro meteoroid detection satellites. All flights were successful.

Between February 1966 and July 1975, NASA launched nine Saturn IBs on two suborbital flights and seven orbital flights (five of which were crewed); all flights were successful.

=== 1960s ===
On April 28, 1960, Chrysler president Lester Lum Colbert was elevated to the position of chairman and William C. Newberg was promoted to president. Newberg unexpectedly resigned after two months on the job. On July 21, 1960, the board of directors announced that it had reached a settlement agreement with Newberg over $450,000 in profits he had made from his stake in two parts suppliers. A second company executive, Jack W. Minor, was forced to resign from his position as director of marketing for the Plymouth–DeSoto–Valiant division after it was found he received $20,000 in sales commissions on Chrysler contracts from two transportation advertising companies he held ownership in. On January 27, 1961, Colbert disclosed that his wife had owned 444 shares in a Chrysler supplier. On July 27, 1961, Colbert announced he was resigning as chairman and president "for the good of the corporation". He was succeeded as chairman by George H. Love and as president by Lynn A. Townsend.

Starting in the 1960 model year, Chrysler built all their passenger cars with Unibody (unit-body or monocoque) construction, except the Imperials which retained body-on-frame construction until 1967. Chrysler thus became the only one of the Big Three American automakers (General Motors Corporation, Ford Motor Company, and Chrysler) to offer unibody construction on the vast majority of their product lines. This construction technique, now the worldwide standard, offers advantages in vehicle rigidity, handling, and crash safety, while reducing squeak and rattle development as the vehicle ages. Chrysler's contributions to the technology included the first use of computers to design unit-body cars, and the first setup where exterior sheet metal was not required for structural strength, making sheet metal replacement easier.

Chrysler's new compact line, the Valiant, opened strong and continued to gain market share for over a decade. Valiant was introduced as a marque of its own, but the Valiant line was placed under the Plymouth marque for US-market sales in 1961. The 1960 Valiant was the first production automobile with an alternator (generating alternating current, paired with diodes for rectification back to direct current) rather than a direct current electrical generator as standard equipment. It proved such an improvement that it was used in all Chrysler products in 1961. The DeSoto marque was withdrawn from the market after the introduction of the 1961 models due in part to the broad array of the Dodge lines and the general neglect of the division. The same affliction plagued Plymouth as it also suffered when Dodge crept into Plymouth's price range. This would eventually lead to the demise of Plymouth several decades later. An ill-advised downsizing of the full-size Dodge and Plymouth lines in 1962 hurt sales and profitability for several years.

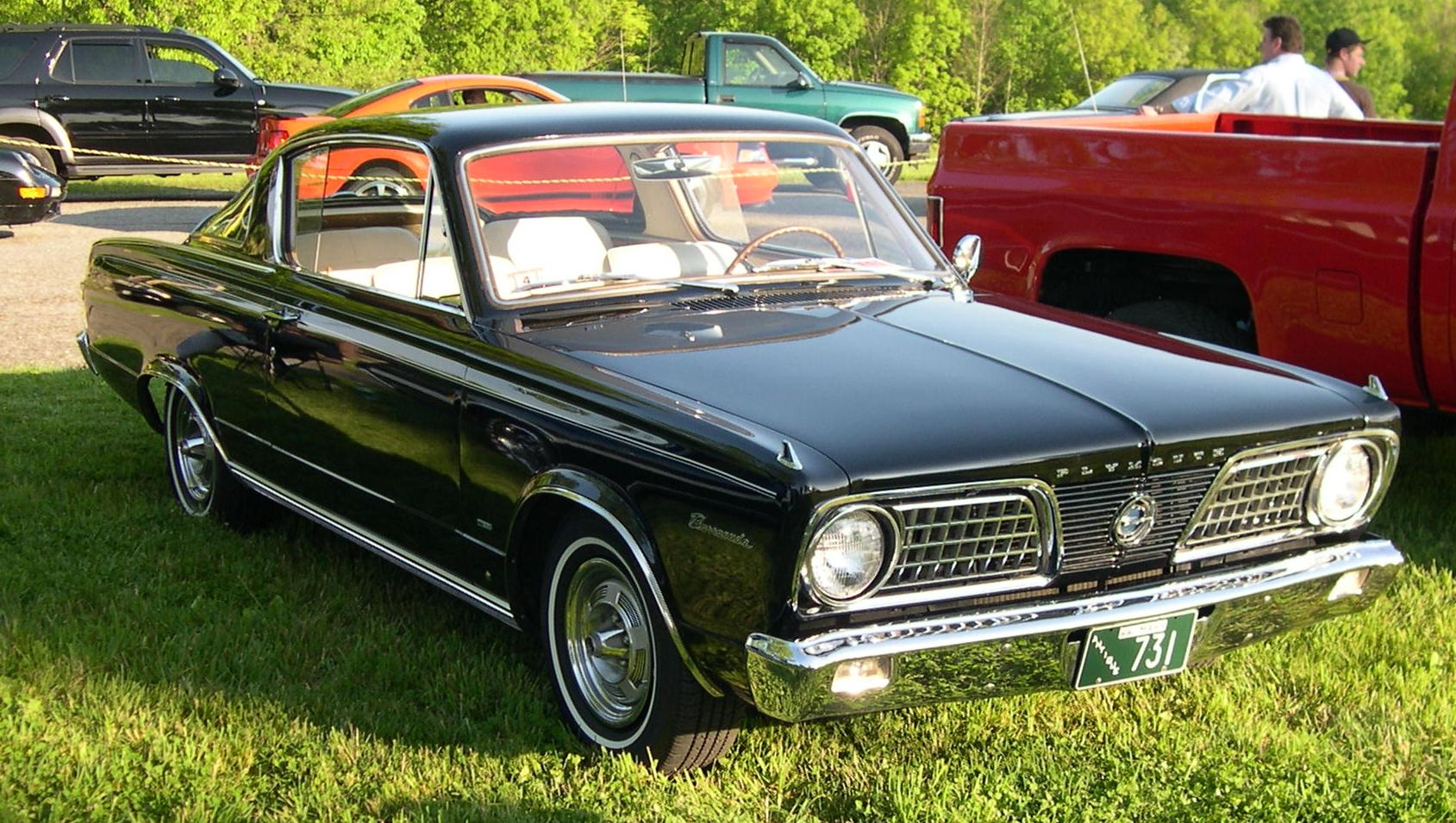
1966 Plymouth Barracuda

Partly to compensate for rust problems on the 1957 models and partly to ensure that their Unibody cars would remain safe, as rust was a larger problem when body panels were required for strength, Chrysler pioneered the use of electrostatic charges to improve anti-rust agent adhesion in their 1960 models. The company was also the first to use a seven-step rust proofing bath system, though not the first to use rust proofing baths.

In April 1964, the Plymouth Barracuda, a Valiant sub-model, was introduced. The huge glass rear window and sloping roof were polarizing styling features. Barracuda was released almost two weeks before Ford's Mustang, making the Barracuda the first pony car. Even so, the Mustang outsold it 10-to-1 between April 1964 and August 1965. Perception of the Barracuda as nothing but a reskinned Valiant was not aided by sharing front-end sheet metal.

Chrysler's target buyers were obviously men, and attracting female buyers was apparently not a high priority, because a 1967 sales brochure proclaimed, "At last—specifications your wife can understand." (This was, perhaps, an improvement over the Dodge La Femme option of 1955. It recognized that women were at least reading the specifications.)

==== Turbine ====
For many years, Chrysler developed gas turbine engines, which are capable of operating on a wide array of combustible fuels, for automotive use. Turbines were common in military vehicles, and Chrysler built many prototypes for passenger cars. In the 1960s, mass production seemed almost ready. Fifty Chrysler Turbine Cars, specialty designed Ghia-bodied coupes were built in 1962 and placed into the hands of consumers for final testing. After further development and testing to make emissions conform to 1970s-enacted EPA standards, the engines were planned as an option for the 1977 model LeBaron. However, Chrysler was forced to abandon the turbine engine as a precondition of U.S. government loan guarantees when the company experienced financial difficulties in the late 1970s.

==== Expansion into Europe ====
In the 1960s, Chrysler expanded into Europe, attaining a majority interest in the British Rootes Group in 1964, Simca of France and Barreiros of Spain, to form Chrysler Europe. For the Rootes Group, one outcome of this takeover was the launch of the Hillman Avenger in 1970 (briefly sold in the U.S. as the Plymouth Cricket), which sold in Britain alongside the rear-engined Imp and the Hunter. During the 1970s the former Rootes Group got into severe financial difficulties. The Simca and Barreiros divisions were more successful, but in the end the various problems were overwhelming and the firm gained little from these ventures. Chrysler sold these assets to PSA Peugeot Citroën in 1978, which in turn sold the British and Spanish truck production lines to Renault of France.

At this same time, Chrysler helped create the muscle car market in the U.S. They produced a street version of their Hemi racing engine and introduced a string of affordable, high-performance vehicles: the Plymouth GTX, Plymouth Road Runner, and Dodge Charger. The racing success of several of these models on the NASCAR circuit burnished the company's engineering reputation.

=== 1970s ===
The 1970s were tumultuous for Chrysler since, like all the American car companies of the era, the company was reliant on a marketplace where cheap oil was the norm. Although Chrysler entered the small car market with the 1971 Dodge Colt, a captive import of the Mitsubishi Galant and the first collaboration between Chrysler and Mitsubishi Motors, it did not sell as well as its competitors, the Ford Pinto and Chevrolet Vega, primarily due to the lack of a four-cylinder engine not being manufactured by Chrysler. As market conditions changed and gas prices rose, Chrysler could not adapt in time. Critics of government regulations have claimed that U.S. anti-trust laws prohibited U.S. automakers from forming Japanese or European-style industry consortiums (which helped these foreign competitors to save costs). Chrysler was also slow to adapt to a gradual tightening of anti-pollution regulations. However, given that Chrysler's European divisions already had both the talent and the knowledge to make fuel-economic, less polluting vehicles, all that Chrysler's management had to do was to import European technology that it already owned. Chrysler's American difficulties, therefore, were largely the result of poor management.

Chrysler's lower sales volumes meant that new development and implementation costs made up a larger proportion of a vehicle's cost compared to Ford and General Motors. To avoid pricing themselves out of the market, Chrysler clumsily detuned its existing engines to meet emission requirements, which resulted in lower fuel economy at a time when fuel prices were rising. There was a rush to sell the compact Dodge Dart and Plymouth Valiant, but the 1973 oil crisis sharply reduced demand for the large, fuel-thirsty vehicles Americans had previously bought in large numbers and which made up the bulk of Chrysler's product line.

At mid-decade, the company scored a conspicuous success with its first entry in the personal luxury car market, the Chrysler Cordoba. The hurried introduction of the Dodge Aspen and Plymouth Volaré in 1976 brought enormous warranty costs to repair faulty design and shoddy construction, and destroyed the longstanding loyalty built up by the Dart and Valiant predecessors. At the time, the product recalls for the Aspen and Volare were the largest ever, eclipsed by the GM X-series the following decade. Chrysler Europe essentially collapsed in 1977, and was offloaded to Peugeot the following year, soon after having helped design the new Plymouth Horizon and Dodge Omni. In 1980, Chrysler Australia, which was producing the locally developed Chrysler Valiant and the Mitsubishi Galant based Chrysler Sigma, was sold to Mitsubishi Motors and changed its name to Mitsubishi Motors Australia Limited. The subcompact Horizon/Omni duo was reaching the US market as the second gas crisis struck, and although they sold well, selling over 300,000 units each in their first year, sales of Chrysler's larger cars were slowing, and the company had no strong compact line to fall back on.

=== 1980s ===
Realizing that the company would go out of business if it did not receive a significant amount of money to turn the company around, Iacocca approached the United States Congress on September 7, 1979 and asked for US$1.5 billion in loan guarantees. Congress reluctantly passed the "Chrysler Corporation Loan Guarantee Act of 1979" Pub. L. 96–185 on December 20, 1979 (signed into law by President Jimmy Carter on January 7, 1980), prodded by Chrysler workers and dealers in every congressional district who feared the loss of their livelihoods. The military then bought thousands of Dodge pickup trucks which entered military service as the Commercial Utility Cargo Vehicle M-880 Series. With such help and a few innovative cars, Chrysler would manage to avoid bankruptcy and slowly recover.

After receiving this reprieve, Chrysler released the first of the K-Car line, the Dodge Aries and Plymouth Reliant, in 1981. Like the minivan which would come later, these compact automobiles were based on design proposals that Ford had rejected during Iacocca's (and Sperlich's) tenure there. Since they were released in the middle of the major 1980–1982 recession, these small, efficient and inexpensive front-wheel drive cars sold rapidly.

Aside from small cars, Iacocca re-introduced the full sized Imperial as a company's flagship. The new model had all of the newest technologies of the time – including fully electronic fuel injection (the first car in the U.S. to be so equipped) and an all-digital dashboard. Despite some marketing help from Iacocca's friend Frank Sinatra, including a special edition named after him, the revived Imperial sold poorly, selling only 12,000 cars out of the 25,000 that were originally planned for production. The Imperial was discontinued after the 1983 model year, and is regarded as the last of the ''Malaise era'' automobiles.

In February 1982 Chrysler announced the sale of Chrysler Defense, its profitable defense subsidiary to General Dynamics for US$348.5 million. The sale was completed in March 1982 for the revised figure of US$336.1 million.

Chrysler also introduced the Dodge Caravan and Plymouth Voyager minivans, which was by and large Sperlich's "baby", in the fall of 1983, which led the automobile industry in sales for 25 years Because of the K-cars and minivans, along with the reforms Iacocca implemented, the company turned around quickly and by 1983, was able to repay the government-backed loans several years ahead of time, resulting in a profit of $350 million to the U.S. government.

In 1987, it was discovered that Chrysler sold an estimated 32,750 cars that had been test-driven with disconnected odometers – some as much as 500 miles (800 km) – before being shipped to dealers. The controversy gained fire after the United States Senate got involved, as Senator Sam Nunn bought one of the Chryslers in question. Chrysler settled out of court with complainants. Chrysler CEO Lee Iacocca sought to minimize damage to the corporation's public image by calling a news conference in which he termed the action "dumb" and "unforgivable".

In 1987, a joint venture with Mitsubishi Motors called Diamond Star Motors strengthened the company's hand in the small car market, and a new plant in Normal, Illinois was constructed to build the first DSM cars, which were introduced in 1990. In the same year, Chrysler acquired American Motors Corporation (AMC) for $1.5 billion dollars (or $3,577,768,014 in 2021 dollars). Although Chrysler received AMC's dealer network and its engineering talent, the main motivations for the buyout were to bring the profitable Jeep brand under the Chrysler umbrella, including the Jeep Grand Cherokee, which AMC had already finished most of the work on, and Iacocca desperately wanted.

The other motivation was the then-new Brampton Assembly plant, which at the time was one of the most advanced vehicle assembly plants in North America, and allowed Chrysler to expand production capacity. Also AMC's Eagle Premier would form the basis for the future Chrysler LH platform sedans that were produced at Brampton. This bolstered the firm's size, but the American Motors purchase was saddled with $900 million in debt. Also, Chrysler was still the weakest of the Big Three.

After AMC's buyout, Chrysler insiders speculated that AMC would take over the larger firm from within. Part of the reason was that AMC's Jeep Cherokee product line alone soon accounted for more than a third of Chrysler's profits. Several AMC leaders became stars at Chrysler, including François Castaing, AMC's vice president for Product Engineering and Development. Chrysler was suffering a five-year product slump after the success with its small cars and minivans, and by the late 1980s was mainly making K-car derivatives that looked and drove alike. Chrysler was in desperate need to replicate the culture at AMC and Renault where work was conducted in an atmosphere "of constant change." Not only was Castaing made Chrysler's point man for fighting Chrysler's competitors, but he was also called to engineer a variety of products.

Chrysler surprised the industry by purchasing Italian sports car maker Lamborghini, with the $25 million acquisition heavily driven by Iacocca. Chrysler executives were appointed to Lamborghini's board, although most of the key members remained. To begin its revival, Lamborghini received a cash injection of US$50 million from its new owner, and the slow-selling Jalpa was discontinued. Lamborghini became profitable, and a more efficient franchise with full service and spare parts support was established, replacing the loosely affiliated and disorganized private dealer network.

Chrysler was interested in entering the "extra premium" sports car market, which Chrysler estimated at about 5,000 cars per year, worldwide. Chrysler aimed to produce a car to compete with the Ferrari 328 by 1991, and also wanted the Italians to produce an engine that could be used in a Chrysler car for the American market, which later became the Viper engine. Chrysler also took Lamborghini into motorsport for the first time, and became involved in the design of the Lamborghini Diablo when Chrysler designer Tom Gale restyled Marcello Gandini's original concept for a softer look, which alienated Gandini. Chrysler also previewed the Lamborghini Portofino concept at the Frankfurt Auto show, but it was poorly received by the press and Lamborghini executives.

Although profits increased past the $1 million mark in 1991, the uptick in fortunes was to be brief; in 1992, sales crashed due to the early 1990s recession, and the $239,000 Diablo proved ultimately to be inaccessible to American enthusiasts. With Lamborghini bleeding money, Chrysler decided that the automaker was no longer producing enough cars to justify its investment, and sold the company to Indonesian conglomerate SEDTCO Pty. for $40 million.

In 1988, Chrysler and Fiat, owner of Alfa Romeo, reached an agreement that named Chrysler to be the exclusive distributor for Alfa Romeo in North America and easily allow Chrysler dealers to sell Alfa products, which lasted until Alfa left the United States in 1995. The initial contact between the two firms would lead to high-level talks in 1990 between Iacocca and Fiat Chairman Giovanni Agnelli about establishing joint ventures in the United States and Europe, and the possibility of Fiat taking a large equity stake in Chrysler. However, talks dragged on and eventually broke off. Ironically, Fiat would acquire a majority stake in Chrysler following its 2009 restructuring.

Iacocca received much credit for Chrysler's turnaround from near bankruptcy, with his commercials giving him celebrity status, and some mentioned him as a potential U.S. presidential candidate in 1988. However the latter part of his tenure from 1988 onwards was less successful. The acquisitions of Gulfstream Aerospace, Electrospace Systems, and other companies was intended to protect Chrysler from the cyclical nature of the auto industry, but a lack of engineering innovation and careless spending during the years of prosperity in the 1980s shrunk the company's working capital from $14.3 billion to just $1.7 billion. An endeavor with Maserati, then-owned by Iacocca's friend Alejandro de Tomaso, resulted in the Chrysler TC by Maserati, a poorly received luxury convertible based on the Chrysler LeBaron which according to Bob Lutz, wound up costing Chrysler "close to $600 million."

In addition, Iacocca enjoyed being in the spotlight and gradually isolated himself from his "Gang of Ford" managers that he had brought over from Ford Motor Company. By 1992, the board pushed Iacocca to retire, albeit with a generous severance package. Iacocca proposed Gerald Greenwald as his replacement, but that bought opposition from the board. Iacocca stepped down as CEO and Chairman of Chrysler at the end of 1992, being succeeded in these posts by GM Europe president Robert Eaton.

Although Bob Lutz was the second-ranking executive in the company, he earlier opposed the merger with Fiat that Iacocca had championed. Due to their feud, Iacocca convinced the board to pass over Lutz for the chairmanship of Chrysler. However, Eaton and Lutz did develop a strong working relationship.

==== Lee Iacocca's Impact ====
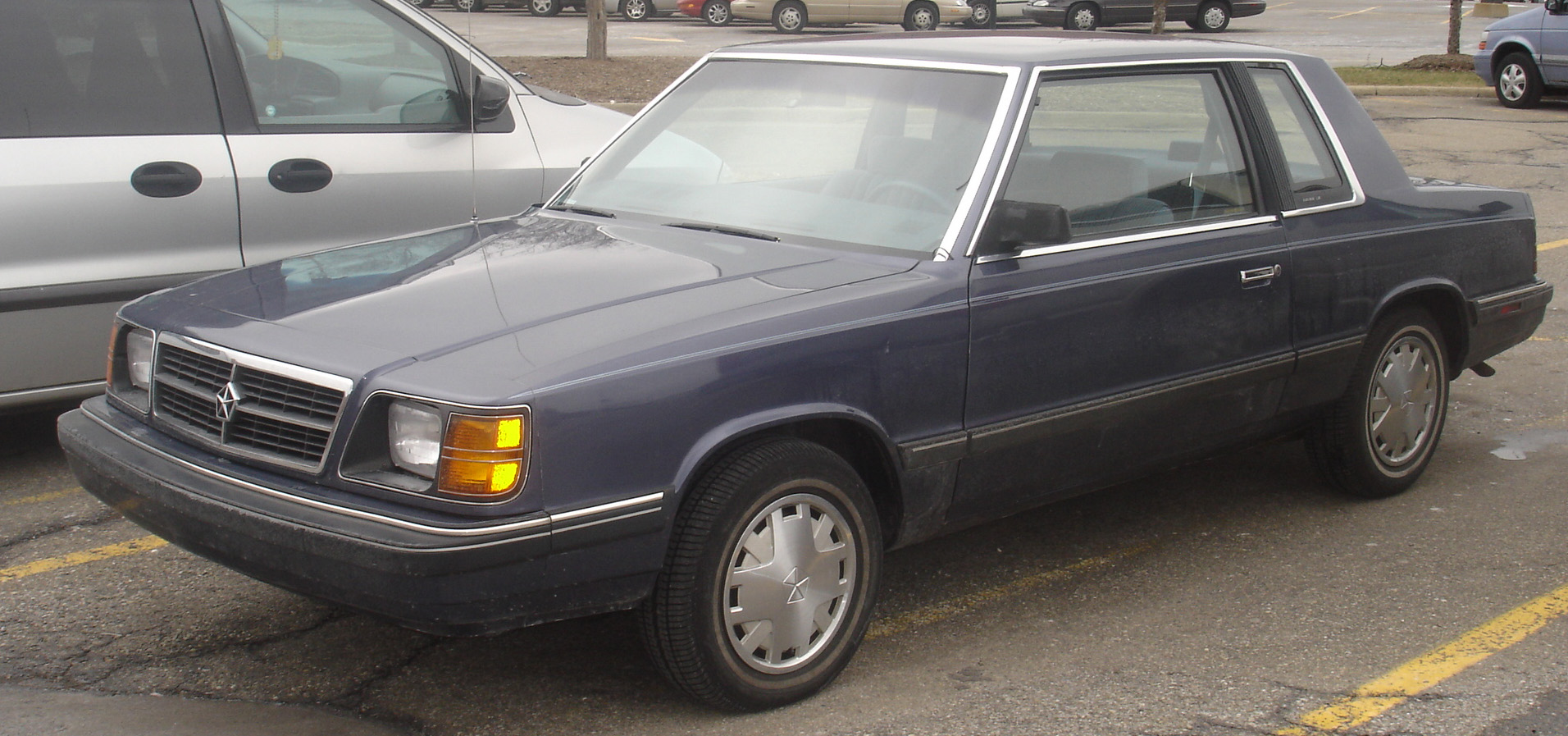
A Dodge Aries. The "K-cars" are generally credited with saving Chrysler from bankruptcy.

In 1978, Lee Iacocca, recently fired from being Ford's executive, was aggressively courted and brought in as CEO. At the time, Chrysler was losing millions, largely due to recalls of the company's Dodge Aspen and Plymouth Volare, cars that Iacocca would later claim should have been delayed until prototypes were fully tested. He began rebuilding the entire company from the ground up, laying off many workers, selling the loss-making Chrysler Europe division to Peugeot for a nominal $1 (or $4.15 in 2021) and bringing in many former associates from his former company. Also from Ford, Iacocca brought to Chrysler the "Mini-Max" project, which would bear fruit in 1983 with the successful Dodge Caravan and Plymouth Voyager. Henry Ford II had wanted nothing to do with the Mini-Max, a restyled version of the minivan that Toyota was selling in huge numbers in Asia and Latin America, which doomed the project at Ford. Hal Sperlich, the driving force behind the Mini-Max at Ford had been fired a few months before Iacocca and was waiting for him at Chrysler, where the two would make automotive history. Iacocca proved to be a capable public spokesman, appearing in advertisements to advise customers that "If you find a better car, buy it." He would also provide a rallying point for Japan-bashing and instilling pride in American products. His book Talking Straight was a response to Akio Morita's Made in Japan.

=== 1990s ===
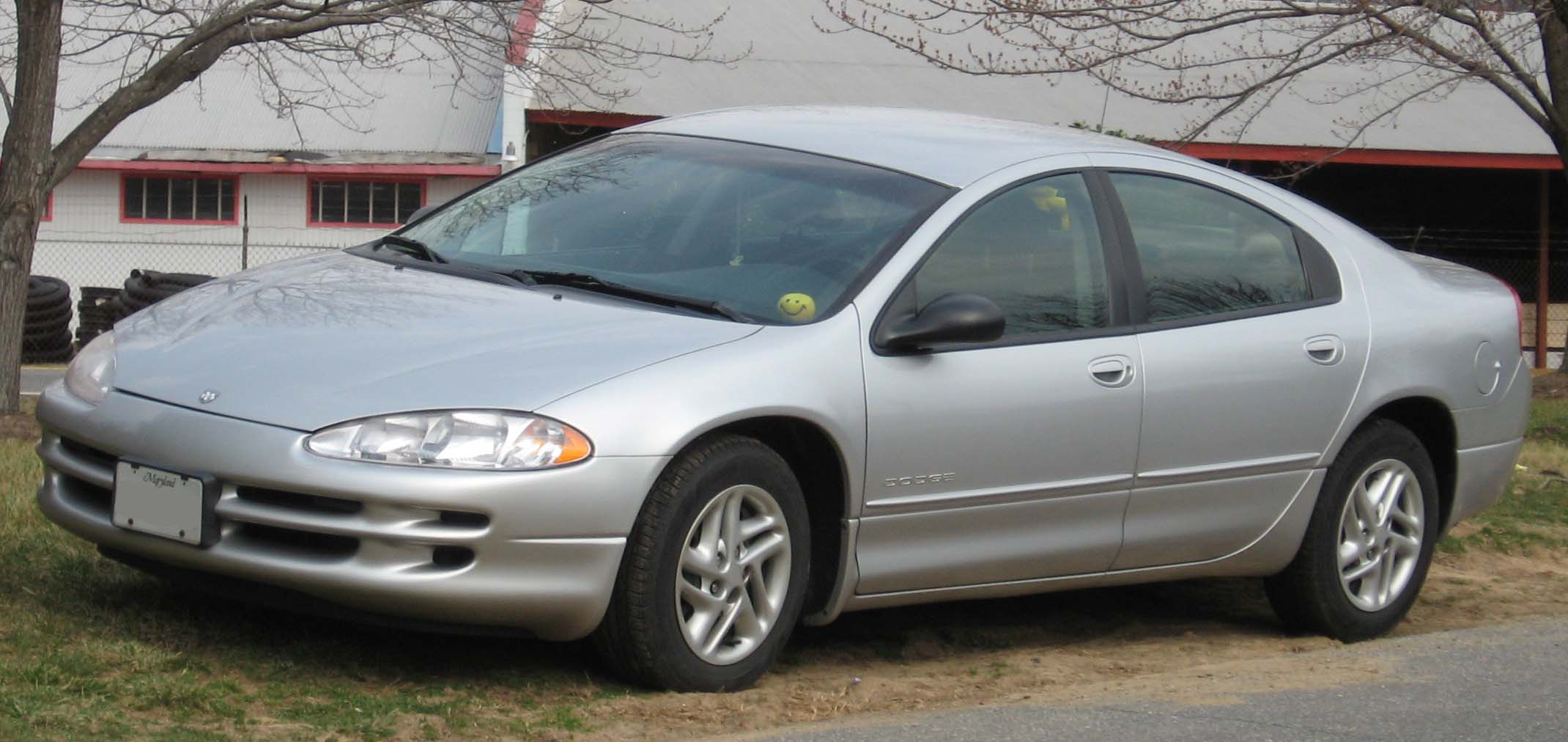
1998–2004 LH platform-based Dodge Intrepid

As the 1990s dawned, Chrysler faced a renewed round of financial troubles. The US economy slipped into a recession following the 1987 Black Monday stock market crash and the Savings and Loan Crisis. In addition, most of Chrysler's lineup was based on the proven but dated K-car platform, and critics routinely criticized their inability to produce fresh designs that were competitive with Japanese companies and Chrysler's Detroit rivals. Engineering teams were now allowed to explore new designs, a process that was largely discouraged under Iacocca's tenure.

François Castaing, by now Chrysler's vice president for Vehicle Engineering, had organized function teams, and incorporated the use of simultaneous engineering; This business process is now known as product lifecycle management. He also designed a new development approach in which teams of engineers focused on a single type of car platform, working on new models as a system from concept to production. An early adopter of PLM technology, Chrysler was able to become the auto industry's lowest-cost producer, recording development costs that were half of the industry average by the mid-1990s.

In 1992, Chrysler introduced the LH platform, replacing the K-derived Chrysler New Yorker and Dodge Dynasty. Like the LH platform's predecessor, the Eagle Premier, the LH cars featured longitudinally-mounted V6 engines with a front-wheel drive drivetrain, unusual in most U.S. front-wheel drive cars, but a hallmark of Renault's designs. The LH cars were the first to use Castaing's platform approach, and were produced in a record 39 months, compared to other Chrysler cars that took more than 50 months. The LH cars competed directly against the Ford Taurus, mid-size cars from Japan, and GM's H and W platform cars.

While Chrysler's sales never rose to the levels of those popular rivals, the LH vehicles succeeded in altering Chrysler's previously dowdy public image, recasting the automaker as an innovative design leader. In 1995, Chrysler introduced the Neon small car to replace the Dodge Shadow and Plymouth Sundance, and the midsize JA platform vehicles replaced the Dodge Spirit and Plymouth Acclaim. By 1996, the K platform and its derivatives had been phased out of production.

The continuing popularity of Jeep with the introduction of the 1992 Grand Cherokee and the 1997 Wrangler, bold new models such as the 1994 Dodge Ram pickup, Dodge Viper sports car, Plymouth Prowler hot rod, redesigned LH sedans and new minivans put the company in a strong position. The success of Castaing's system was exemplified not just by the attraction of Daimler-Benz as the suitor for Chrysler, but by more than just a passing interest from General Motors and Toyota. At that time, Chrysler executives such as Bob Lutz, Thomas Stallkamp, Robert Eaton and Castaing "made Chrysler the most nimble of Detroit's three carmakers."

In the early 1990s, Chrysler set up car production in Austria, and began producing right hand drive Jeep models in a 1993 return to the UK market after a 15-year hiatus.

In 1991, Chrysler began the process of moving its corporate headquarters from its 1925 founding location of Highland Park, Michigan, to nearby Auburn Hills. The move was complete by 1993.

In 1995, former CEO Lee Iacocca assisted in billionaire Kirk Kerkorian's hostile takeover of Chrysler, which was ultimately unsuccessful. The next year, Kerkorian and Chrysler made a five-year agreement that includes a gag order preventing Iacocca from speaking publicly about Chrysler.

Chrysler was among the companies boycotted by gay rights groups after removing advertisements from the ABC sitcom Ellen in 1997, which it deemed "controversial."

=== DaimlerChrysler 1998–2007 ===
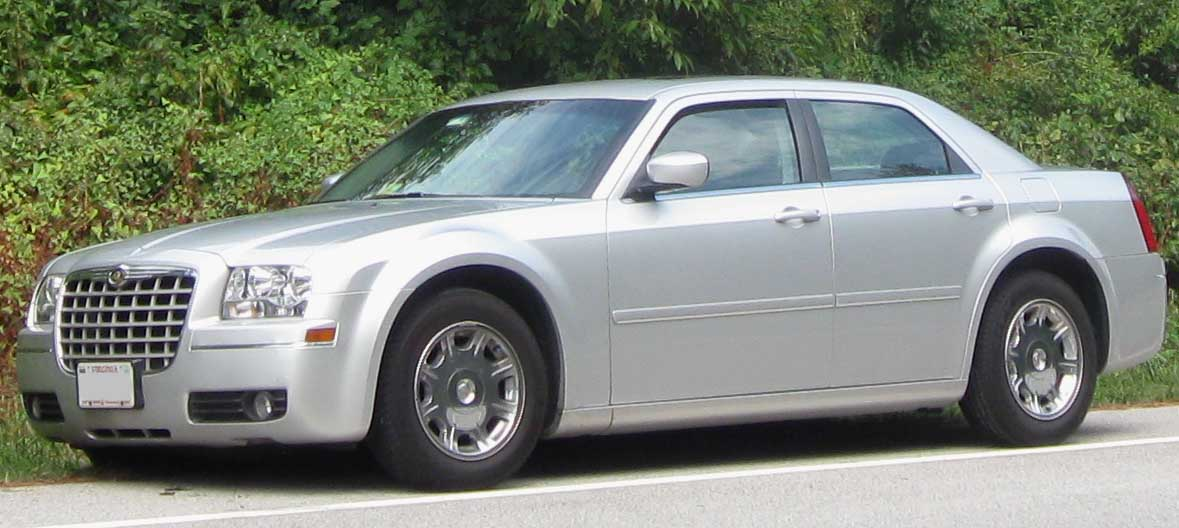
2005–2010 Chrysler 300

In 1998, Daimler-Benz and Chrysler had formed a 50–50 partnership. Chrysler Corporation then was legally renamed DaimlerChrysler Motors Company LLC, while its total operations began doing business as Chrysler Group. This was initially declared to be a merger of equals, but it became evident that once Chrysler Chairman and CEO Bob Eaton retired, that Daimler would take majority control. Other executives like President Thomas T. Stallkamp, once considered the heir-apparent of Eaton, and Vice-Chairman Bob Lutz were soon forced out. Eaton, Stallkamp, and Lutz had been described as the "triumvirate" responsible for Chrysler's successes in the late 1990s, with much credit going to Lutz's platform design teams. Daimler-Benz got the remainder of Chrysler, excluding the Eagle brand, which was dissolved that year.

Then-Daimler-Benz CEO Juergen Schrempp had "promised a marriage made in heaven and huge synergies". But Martin H. Wiggers' concept of a platform strategy like the VW Group, was implemented only for a few models, so the synergy effects in development and production were too low. However, it proved to be a disaster for Daimler, which poured billions of dollars into Chrysler, draining management and resources, and repeatedly dragging down its Mercedes-Benz luxury vehicle subsidiary. Chrysler President James P. Holden was responsible for misjudging the launch of the all-new 2001 minivan that resulted in an expensive surplus of 2000 models, losing considerable market share to rivals like Honda and Toyota (Chrysler had created and long dominated the minivan market), and also underestimated demand for the surprisingly popular PT Cruiser (originally planned to be a Plymouth vehicle), resulting in a $512 million third-quarter loss in 2000 that led to his firing later that year.

Dieter Zetsche was appointed CEO of the Chrysler Group in 2000. The Plymouth brand was dissolved in 2001, and plans for cost cutting by sharing of platforms and components began. After Daimler began importing the Mercedes-Benz Sprinter into the US badged as a Freightliner and later a Dodge, the Mercedes-Benz SLK (R170)-based Chrysler Crossfire coupé/roadster and the Chrysler Pacifica three-row crossover were introduced in 2004 as the first vehicles co-developed under the merger; the Crossfire was unsuccessful while the Pacifica had reliability and quality problems. A return to rear-wheel drive was announced for a new line of full size cars, spearheaded by the Chrysler 300, Dodge Charger and Dodge Magnum which used some Mercedes-Benz W211 components and offered a new HEMI V8 engine as a performance option. While the Magnum received a tepid reception in the market, the 300 and the Charger garnered much attention and sold well. The partnership with Mitsubishi was dissolved as DaimlerChrysler divested its stake in the firm. Financial performance improved and Chrysler was generating a significant part of Daimler-Chrysler's profits from 2004 to 2005, as the other subsidiary, Mercedes-Benz, incurred costs for restructuring. By 2005, Chrysler was said to be the healthiest of the Detroit Three automakers (compared to General Motors and Ford Motor Company).

As a result of Zetsche's apparent success in a turnaround of Chrysler, Juergen Schrempp, the CEO of parent company Daimler-Chrysler, was pressured to retire early. Zetsche was elevated to CEO of Daimler-Chrysler on January 1, 2006, and Thomas W. LaSorda became president and CEO of Chrysler Group. However, in 2006, while DCX's other subsidiary Mercedes-Benz turned a profit, Chrysler swung to a loss and analysts believed that the profitable years of 2004–05 would be unlikely to be return in the future. That led to suggestions that the eight-year merger would come to an end, as Mercedes (which made up around 33% of Daimler's $200 billion in 2006 revenues) did not get any competitive boost from Chrysler, and that Daimler would be a stronger and more profitable group without the U.S. unit. Zetsche admitted that Chrysler offered no serious scale of advantages, though he initially insisted a spinoff was not being considered and said that management's first priority is to fix the problems at Chrysler by trimming production and redoubling efforts to boost its competitiveness.

Some suggest that Zetsche's tenure was a mixed success, with Chrysler still relying heavily on gas-guzzling SUVs and trucks, most of its product lineup was unsuccessful, despite using Mercedes-derived technologies. Despite radical restructuring and improved models, analysts said that it was difficult to expect a solid recovery at Chrysler, due to the negative dynamics of the U.S. auto market and Chrysler's legacy labor and health care costs. In 2006, Zetsche had starred in the "Dr. Z" ad campaign which cast him as an all-knowing, German-accented wizard of the auto industry, in TV spots and a website. The strategy was to communicate that Chrysler was backed up by the same Teutonic know-how and discipline that has long made Mercedes-Benz one of the world's most prestigious brands. However, the campaign was moth-balled in 2007. Eight years since the merger, most customers did not know that Chrysler was owned by the same company that also produces Mercedes-Benz luxury cars. Some surveyed thought Zetsche was so smooth on screen—even to the point of head-butting a soccer ball perfectly in one take—that he was an actor and not the actual CEO.

=== Chrysler sale to Cerberus 2007–2009 ===
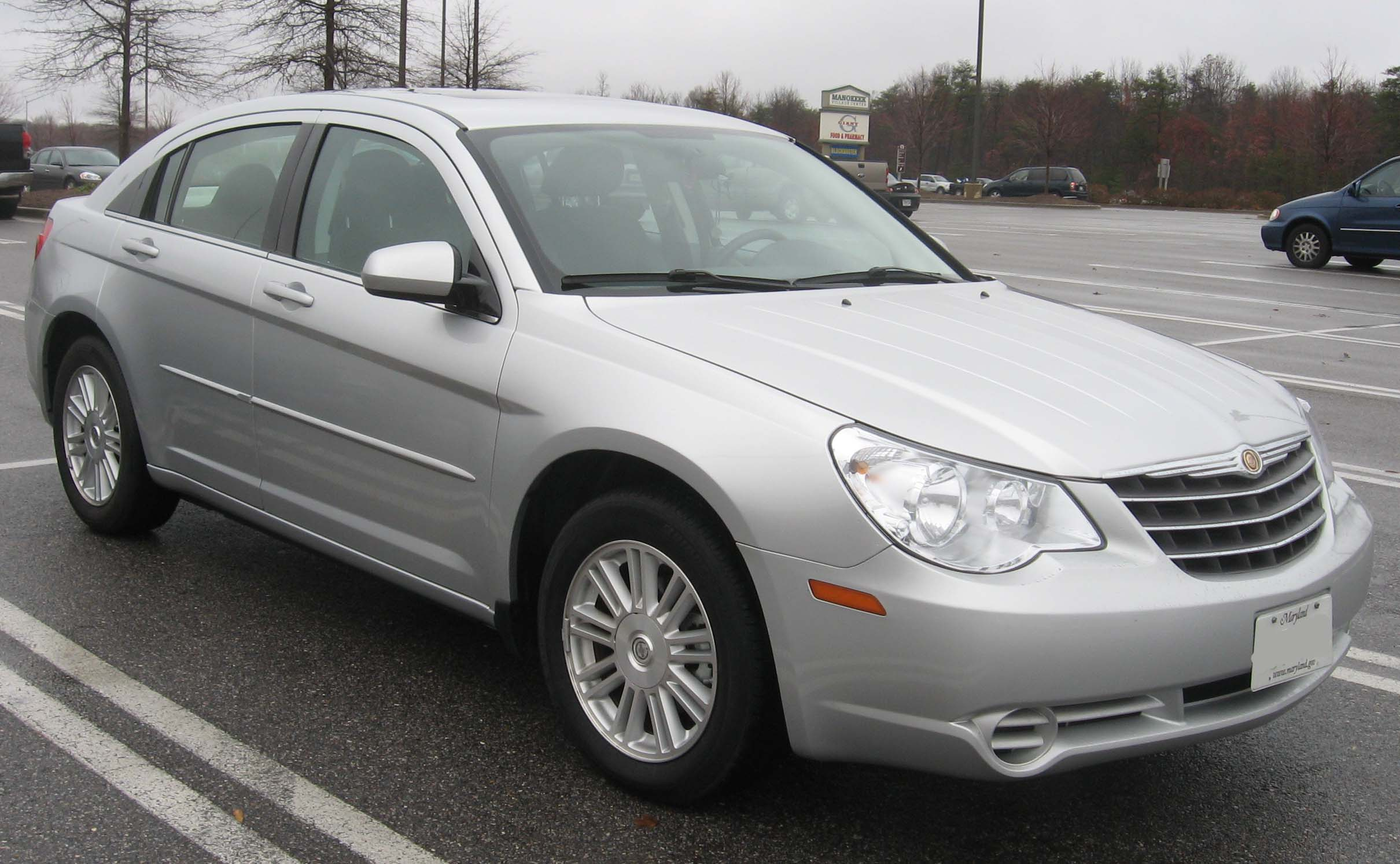
Second generation Chrysler Sebring sedan

According to the April 2007 issue of Der Spiegel, CEO Dieter Zetsche expressed a desire to dismantle Chrysler and sell off the majority stake and at the same time keep Chrysler "dependent" upon Mercedes-Benz after the sale. On April 4, 2007, Zetsche said that the company was negotiating the sale of Chrysler, which was rumored for weeks before the announcement. The following day investor Kirk Kerkorian placed a 4.5 billion dollar bid for Chrysler. On April 12, Magna International of Canada announced it was searching for partners to place a bid for Chrysler. Magna's offer was later outbid.

DaimlerChrysler AG announced on May 14, 2007 that it would sell 80.1% of its stake in the Chrysler Group to Cerberus Capital Management for US$7.4 billion. Chrysler Group (DaimlerChrysler Corporation) would officially become Chrysler Holding LLC (changed to Chrysler LLC upon completion of the sale), with two subsidiaries – Chrysler Motors LLC (new name of DaimlerChrysler Motors Company), which produces Chrysler/Dodge/Jeep vehicles, and Chrysler Financial Services LLC (new name of DaimlerChrysler Financial Services Americas LLC), which took over the operations of Chrysler Financial. DaimlerChrysler AG changed its name to Daimler AG.

Chrysler LLC unveiled a new company logo, a variation of the previously used Pentastar logo, and launched its new website on August 6, 2007. Robert Nardelli became chairman and CEO. In the resulting management shuffle, LaSorda was relegated to the number two position as President and Vice Chairman of Chrysler LLC, Jim Press, previously President of Toyota Motor Sales, U.S.A., Inc., was appointed Co-President and Vice Chairman. While LaSorda's titles at Chrysler LLC officially stated that he was in charge of manufacturing, procurement and supply, employee relations, global business development and alliances, his actual role in the company was largely to find a new partner or buyer for Chrysler. Cerberus Capital was said to be less interested in rebuilding the auto manufacturer as a long-term investment, rather it was focused on turning a short-term profit though a leveraged buyout.

The new company experienced its first labor dispute on October 10, 2007. A strike deadline of 11 am had been set by the United Auto Workers (UAW) union leadership pending successful negotiation of a new contract patterned after the pact with GM. As the talks progressed past the deadline, most Chrysler unionized workers walked off their jobs. With media speculation about the impact of a long strike, an impromptu announcement after 5 pm the same day indicated that a tentative agreement had been reached, thus ending the walkout after just over six hours.

Chrysler collaborated with Tata Motors Limited of India: Tata's all-electric Ace mini truck will be sold through Chrysler's GEM, Global Electric Motorcars division. Chrysler announced in February 2008 that it would be reducing its product line from 30 models to 15 models. Chrysler was reported in August 2008 to be in talks with Fiat.

=== 2008 financial crisis ===
In October 2008, Cerberus and General Motors discussed an exchange of GM's 49% stake in GMAC for Chrysler, potentially merging two of Detroit's "Big Three" automakers. These talks did not come to fruition, and were discontinued the next month. On October 24, 2008, Chrysler announced a 25% cut (5,000 jobs) in its salaried and contract workforce in November 2008. Michigan Gov. Jennifer Granholm announced that she, along with 5 other governors, sent a letter to Treasury Secretary Henry Paulson and Federal Reserve Chairman Ben Bernanke requesting emergency funding for the Detroit Big Three Automakers. On the same day, General Motors asked the Treasury Department of the United States for $10 billion to help restructure both their company and possible future sibling, Chrysler so that in turn, they can become one massive company.

On October 23, 2008, Daimler announced that its stake in Chrysler had a book value of zero dollars after write offs and charges.

On November 5, 2008 it was published that Chrysler sales in the US market have fallen 34.9 percent in only 12 months. A week later, Chrysler CEO Robert Nardelli said, in a speech at an Ernst & Young conference, that the company can only remain viable by forming an alliance with another automaker, domestic or global, as well as receiving government assistance in the form of an equity stake. Several days later, Chrysler together with Ford and General Motors, sought financial aid at a Congressional hearing in Washington D.C. in the face of worsening conditions caused by the automotive industry crisis. All three companies were unsuccessful and were invited to draft a new action plan for the sustainability of the industry.

At the beginning of December 2008, amid the 2008 automobile crisis, Chrysler announced that they were dangerously low on cash and may not survive past 2009. After the defeat of the auto bailout in the Senate, Chrysler stated that they would most likely file for bankruptcy and shut down all operations permanently. On December 17, 2008, Chrysler announced that it planned to halt production at all 30 of its manufacturing plants through January 19, 2009. In addition, Chrysler Financial announced that it would charge fees on dealers holding inventories of new cars and trucks that are unsold after more than 360 days, and will require immediate payment of all remaining balances on inventories of used vehicles that remain unsold after six months. On December 19, President George W. Bush announced a $13.4 billion rescue loan for the American automakers, including Chrysler.

Chrysler's 2008 performance was hard hit among the Big Three U.S. automakers, with 398,119 automobiles and 1,055,003 trucks sold during the year.

On March 13, 2009, LaSorda told the House of Commons of Canada finance committee that the initial GM-CAW deal was insufficient and that Chrysler would demand an hourly wage cut of $20, breaking the Canadian Auto Workers's negotiating pattern set by GM. He suggested that Chrysler may withdraw from Canada if it fails to achieve more substantial cost savings from the CAW. Fiat CEO Sergio Marchionne - Canadian-raised - had also threatened to walk away from a possible (and eventual) merger if the CAW did not make sufficient concessions to match the wages of the "transplants" (foreign automaker's US and Canadian plants), which the union eventually agreed to by cutting benefits. Meanwhile Chrysler LLC has since filed for bankruptcy, though Fiat would continue to implement the strategic alliance.

On March 7, 2009, Chrysler Vice-Chairman Jim Press stated that current sales volume is sufficient to keep the company going as sales should rise in the coming months. The Chrysler executive also noted the automaker's February retail sales were better than Ford's as Chrysler continued to curtail lower-margin fleet sales. He also said the volumes being forecast for 2009 were within the estimates Chrysler envisioned in preparing its viability plan for the federal government.

On March 30, 2009, the White House announced it would provide an additional $6 billion in further support to Chrysler contingent on the company finalizing an alliance with Fiat before the end of April. Talks and hearings at U.S.Treasury in Washington, D.C. went on throughout the following month.

=== US Government backing of warranties ===
On March 30, 2009 President Barack Obama issued a US Government guarantee of Chrysler's warranty liabilities, and publicly stated the U.S. Government will back the warranties on Chrysler vehicles if the company were to go out of business.

=== Chapter 11 reorganization ===
On January 20, 2009, Fiat S.p.A. and Chrysler LLC announced that they have a non-binding term sheet to form a global alliance. Under the terms of the potential agreement, Fiat could take a 35% stake in Chrysler and gain access to its North American dealer network in exchange for providing Chrysler with the platform to build smaller, more fuel-efficient vehicles in the US and reciprocal access to Fiat's global distribution network.

By mid-April, as talks intensified between the two automakers to reach an agreement by a government-imposed deadline of April 30, Fiat's initial stake was reported to be 20% with some influence on the structure of top management of the company. However, Fiat has warned that the merger would not take place if Chrysler fails to reach an agreement with the UAW and the Canadian Auto Workers' Union. On April 26, 2009, it appeared as if Chrysler had reached a deal with the unions which would meet federal requirements, though details were not made available. Chrysler said the union agreement "provides the framework needed to ensure manufacturing competitiveness and helps to meet the guidelines set forth by the U.S. Treasury Department." Chrysler filed for chapter 11 bankruptcy protection at the Federal Bankruptcy Court of the Southern District of New York, in Manhattan, on April 30, 2009, and announced an alliance with Fiat.

Both the White House and Chrysler expressed hope for a "surgical" bankruptcy lasting 30 to 60 days, with the result of reducing the company's liabilities and post-bankruptcy emergence in stronger financial shape. The submitted court documents indicated that there would be a reorganization plan presented to the court in 120 days, on August 28, 2009. A White House official indicated that the government would provide debtor-in-possession financing for between $US 3 billion to $US 3.5 billion, and upon a completion of Chrysler bankruptcy restructuring and court proceedings, the company would be eligible to receive up to $US 4.5 billion in financing to resume operations, for total of $US 8 billion of government support. Prior to the bankruptcy filing, Chrysler had received $US 4.5 billion in financing from the U.S. government, under a George W. Bush administration plan, in December 2008, after Congress declined to approve legislation to provide federal loans. Chrysler announced on the day of the bankruptcy filing, that during the restructuring, it would cease most manufacturing operations on May 4, 2009, and resume production "when the transaction is completed, which is anticipated within 30 to 60 days."

On May 1, 2009, Chrysler LLC filed for bankruptcy, and LaSorda stepped down as President and Vice-Chairman and retired, despite Fiat urging him to stay on.

On May 14, 2009 Chrysler filed with the bankruptcy court to terminate the dealership agreements of 789, or about 25% of its dealerships.

On June 1, 2009 a US bankruptcy court approved a plan which spells out that the new Chrysler company called "Chrysler Group LLC". The VEBA formed by the United Auto Workers Union to provide health care for Chrysler retirees will hold 55%. Minority stakes will be held by Fiat (20%) and the US (8%) and Canadian (2%) governments. Fiat has stated it plans to increase its share to 35% if Chrysler meets certain goals.

On June 8, 2009, Supreme Court Associate Justice Ruth Bader Ginsburg, who is assigned to emergency motions arising from the United States Appeals Court for the Second Circuit, in a one-sentence order, stayed the orders of the bankruptcy judge allowing the sale, pending further order by Justice Ginsburg or the Supreme Court.

On June 9, 2009, the Supreme Court published its denial of the applications for a stay of the sale from the three Indiana funds, allowing the sale of assets to "New Chrysler" to proceed. According to the two page decision and order, the Indiana funds "have not carried the burden" of demonstrating that the Supreme Court needed to intervene. The U.S. Department of the Treasury issued a statement saying: "We are gratified that not a single court that reviewed this matter, including the U.S. Supreme, found any fault whatsoever with the handling of this matter by either Chrysler or the U.S. government." The proposed sale of assets is scheduled to close on Wednesday, June 10, 2009, when the money to finance the deal is wired by the government. Fiat will receive equity in the New Chrysler through its contribution of automobile platforms as a base for a new line of Chrysler cars.

On June 10, 2009, 41 days after filing for bankruptcy protection, the sale of most of Chrysler assets to "New Chrysler", formally known as Chrysler Group LLC, was completed. The federal government financed the deal with US$6.6 billion in financing, paid to the "Old Chrysler", formally called Old Carco LLC. The transfer does not include eight manufacturing locations, nor many parcels of real estate, nor equipment leases. Contracts with 789 U.S. auto dealerships, who are being dropped, were not transferred.

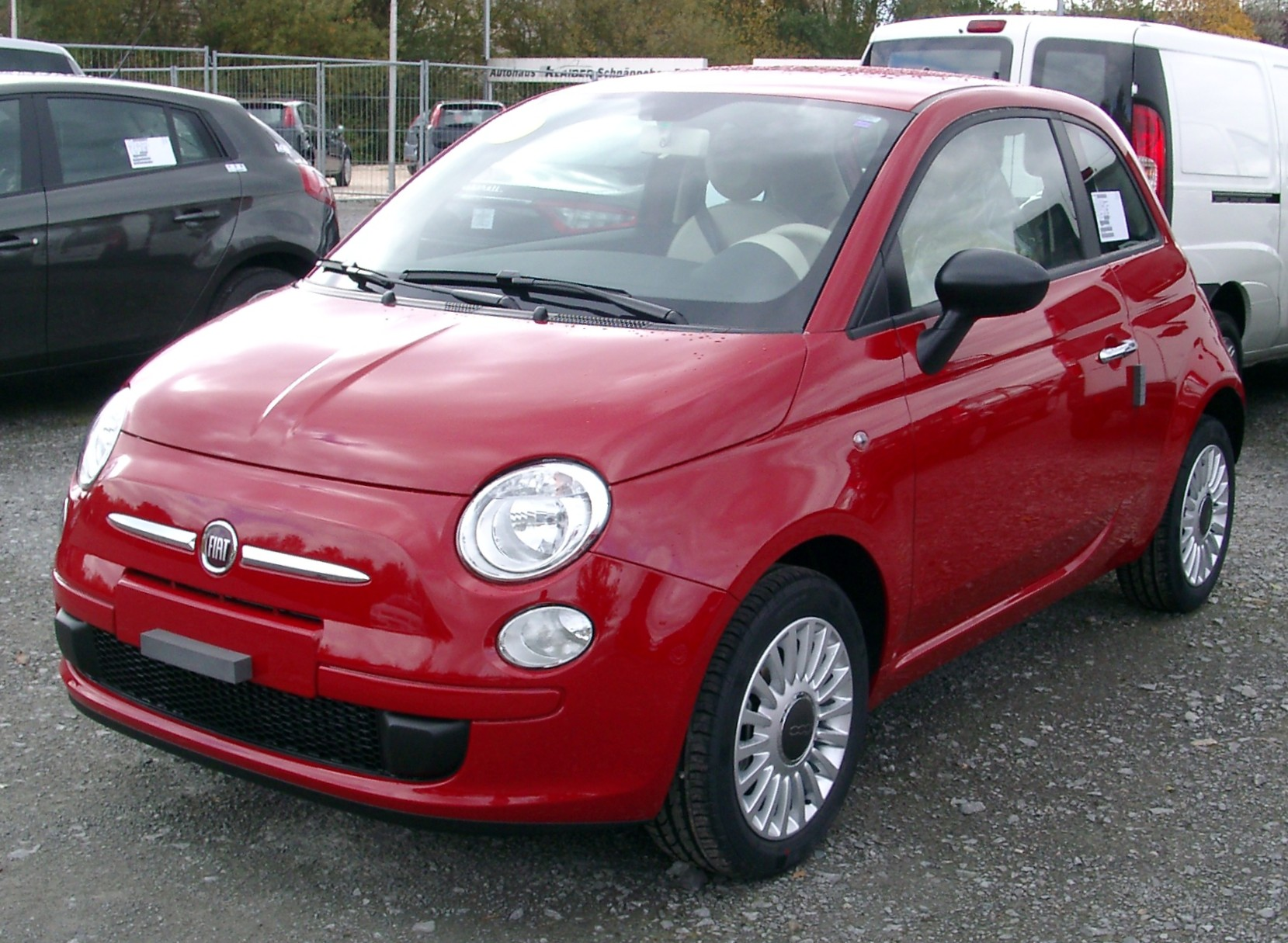
Fiat will sell its own models – such as this Fiat Nuova 500 – through Chrysler in the United States

Fiat initially owned a minority 20% stake of Chrysler Group LLC with the option of taking additional equity up to a 35% stake if certain operational and capitalization goals were achieved. The United Auto Workers’ union retiree health care trust fund (Volunteer Employee Benefit Association) was the majority owner, with 55 percent when Fiat reached its target holding of 35%. The U.S. and Canadian governments initially held minority stakes of 8% and 2%, respectively, of the new Chrysler.

On May 24, 2011, Fiat paid back $7.6 billion in U.S. and Canadian government loans. On July 21, Fiat bought the Chrysler shares held by the United States Treasury. With the purchase, Chrysler once again became foreign owned; this time Italian car maker Fiat gained majority ownership and control of Chrysler. The United States government's involvement in the Chrysler bankruptcy cost the U.S. taxpayer $1.3 billion.

== Chrysler Group ==
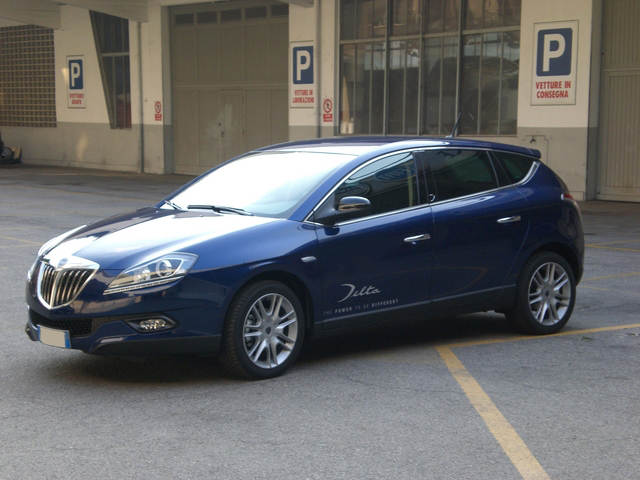
Lancia Delta to be marketed in the US as the Chrysler Delta

In early 2009, Chrysler Group, based in Auburn Hills, Michigan, became majority owned by the United Auto Workers Voluntary Employee Beneficiary Association trust. In June 2009 Fiat gained ownership of Chrysler Group as a part of Chrysler's restructuring plan, and eventually gained 58% total stake in the company. Fiat stated plans for the Chrysler brand and Lancia to codevelop products, with some vehicles being shared. Olivier Francois, Lancia's CEO, took over as CEO of the Chrysler division in October 2009. Fiat has stated that, depending on the market, some Chrysler cars will be sold as Lancias and vice versa. Francois planned to reestablish the Chrysler brand as an upscale brand, a position somewhat muddied since the K-car era in the 80's, and especially after the Plymouth brand was discontinued. At the 2010 Detroit Auto Show, A Chrysler badged Lancia Delta was on display, likely the first Lancia to be sold as a Chrysler and possibly as a replacement for the Chrysler PT Cruiser. Dodge, Jeep, Chrysler get makeover by refreshing, redesigning or replacing every car and truck, swapping out engines and creating vehicles people want.

On 16 December 2014, Chrysler Group LLC announced a name change to FCA US LLC.

== Timeline of Chrysler ==
- Maxwell Motor Company (1904–1925)
- Chrysler Corporation (1925–1998)
- DaimlerChrysler AG (1998–2007)
- Chrysler LLC (2007–2009)
- Chrysler Group LLC (2009–2014)
- FCA US LLC (2014–2021)
- Stellantis North America (2021–present)

== Logos ==
=== Golden seal logo ===
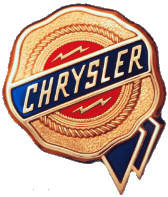
(Left): the first logo of the company, launched in 1925 and used until 1955; (right): "forward look" logo, used 1955–1962

With its inception in 1925, Chrysler's logo was a round medallion with a ribbon bearing the name 'CHRYSLER' in uppercase block letters. It The logo resembled a seal that was used at government fairs as an award. The original symbol fell out of use in 1954 and was forgotten for several decades until the company decided to return to its origins. The logo was designed by one of Chrysler engineers, Oliver Clark, by request of company's founder Walter Chrysler.

The seal was dropped in 1955 and would return in 1993, being placed at the center of a winged emblem in 1997.

=== Forward Look ===
Virgil Exner's radical "Forward Look" redesign of Chrysler Corporation's vehicles for the 1955 model year was underscored by the company's adoption of a logo by the same name. The Forward Look logo consisted of two overlapped boomerang shapes, suggesting space age rocket-propelled motion.

=== Pentastar ===
As the Forward Look styling cycle was ending, Chrysler President Lynn Townsend sought a new logo usable by all of Chrysler's worldwide divisions and subsidiaries, automotive and non-automotive, on packaging, stationery, signage and advertising. He wanted something that would be immediately identifiable as Chrysler's mark to anyone who saw it, in any culture.

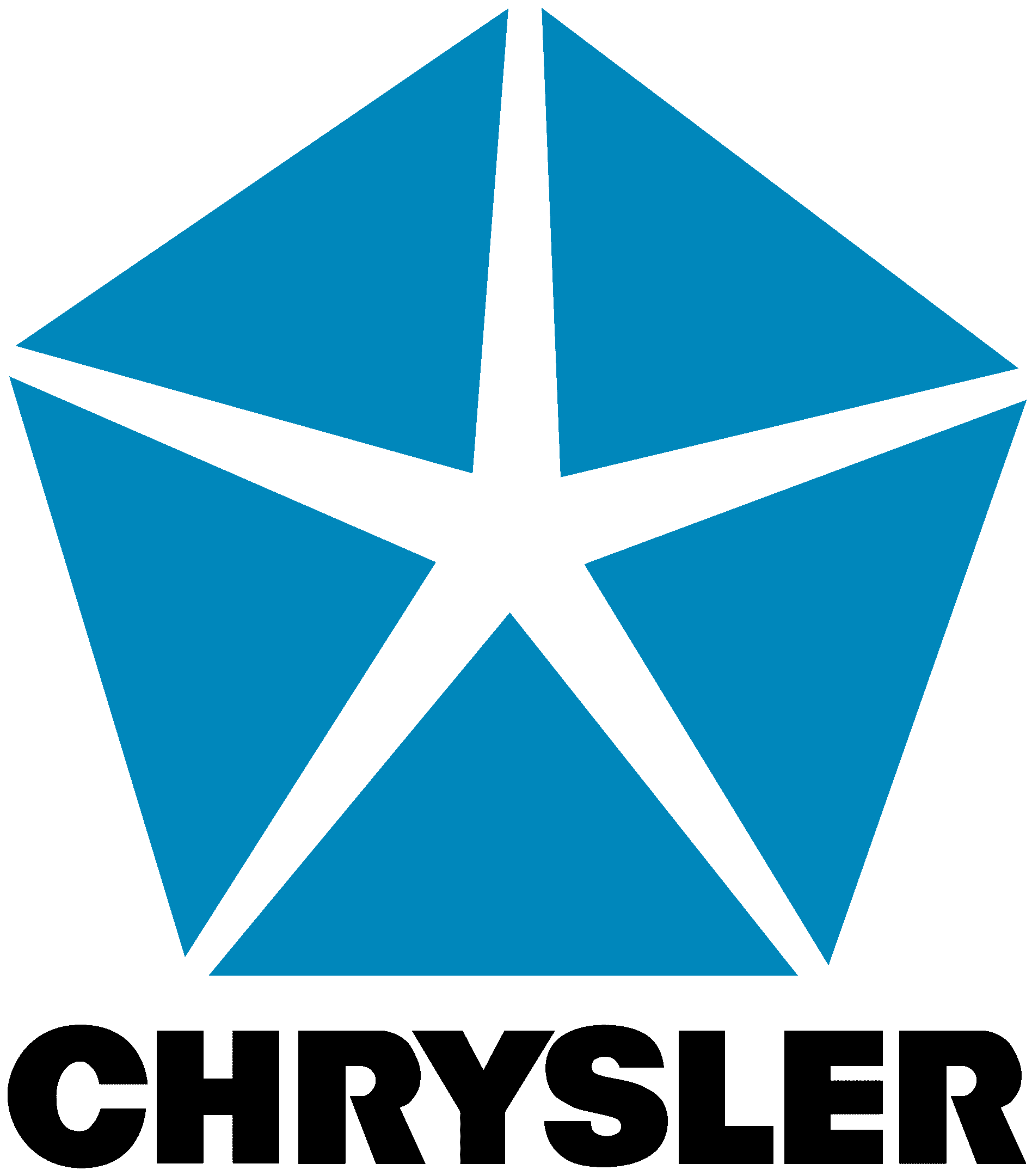
The Pentastar logo was introduced in 1962

In September 1962, the company adopted a logo named "Pentastar", made of five triangles arranged so their bases formed the sides of a pentagon. The gaps in between the triangles formed a star in the middle of the pentagon. The Pentastar was simple and easily recognizable, even on revolving signs, and was not tied to any particular automotive styling feature as had been the previous Forward Look logo. Because the symbol contained no text, it facilitated Chrysler's expansion in international markets. The Pentastar was extensively used on dealer signage, advertisements, and promotional brochures, as well as on Chrysler products themselves.

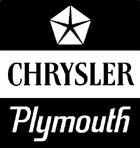
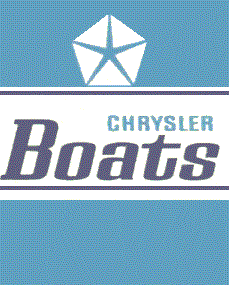
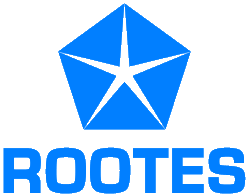
The Pentastar figure was used not only for the main corporation but also in its Boats and Plymouth division as well in UK subsidiary Rootes Group (from left to right)

Chrysler-Plymouth literature, advertisements, and dealership signage used a blue Pentastar or a white one on a blue background, while Dodge used a red Pentastar or a white one on a red background. Divisional logos such as Dodge's Fratzog were gradually phased out until, by 1981, all Chrysler divisions used only the Pentastar. All vehicle brands and all the other Chrysler divisions and services—air conditioning systems, heating, industrial engines, marine engines, outboard motors, boats, transmissions, four-wheel drive systems, powdered metal products, adhesives, chemical products, plastics, electronics, tanks, missiles, leasing, finance and auto parts—were identified by the Pentastar. Upon Chrysler's 1987 acquisition of American Motors and its subsequent rebranding as Chrysler's Jeep-Eagle division, the division logo used the exact shade of red and blue from the last AMC logo while incorporating the Pentastar; unlike the legacy Chrysler brands, Jeep and Eagle never incorporated the Pentastar as its main logo.

The Pentastar logo was placed on the lower passenger-side fender of all Chrysler products, including non-US brands, from 1963 into the 1972 model year. It was placed on the passenger-side fender so it could be viewed by passers-by, a subtle method of getting the symbol ingrained in the public's mind: a nameplate has to be read, but a symbol is quickly recognizable without reading. Thus left-hand drive cars had the Pentastar on the right fender, while right-hand drive cars had it on the left. Starting in the 1980s, hood ornaments on Chrysler-brand vehicles used a gem-like version of the Pentastar to signify the brand's upscale status.

The Pentastar's final badging appearance was on rare versions of the 1996 Plymouth Voyager. It was also applied to the steering wheel, keys, and fenders of the Voyager and the other Chrysler NS minivans into 2000.

The Pentastar continued to represent Chrysler until the merger with Daimler in 1998, when it was retired. Among the few remaining traces of this motif was a large, star-shaped window at DaimlerChrysler's American headquarters in Auburn Hills, Michigan, and Pentastar Aviation, a former DaimlerChrysler subsidiary which reverted to its original name after being purchased by a member of the Ford family. Many dealerships still have signage and other traces still visually apparent to the Pentastar, where a five-Pentastar logo remains in use as the logo of the "Five Star Dealer" service rank.

Despite having been officially retired under Daimler, the Pentastar continued to be used as the identifying trademark or logo on Chrysler Group parts, as seen on window glass, on individual components, molded plastic assemblies, and larger parts such as (reportedly) engine blocks.

The Pentastar was officially reintroduced in 2007; however, was replaced with the stylized letters "FCA" for Fiat Chrysler Automobiles in 2014. Even though Chrysler became a part of Stellantis in 2021, which was formed by the merger of FCA and the French automaker PSA Group, the Pentastar logo is still maintained at the headquarters' building.

Incidentally, the Pentastar is also used as the badge of the United States Army's V Corps, and a similar symbol was used as the semi-official emblem of the League of Nations in 1939.

=== Return of divisional logos ===
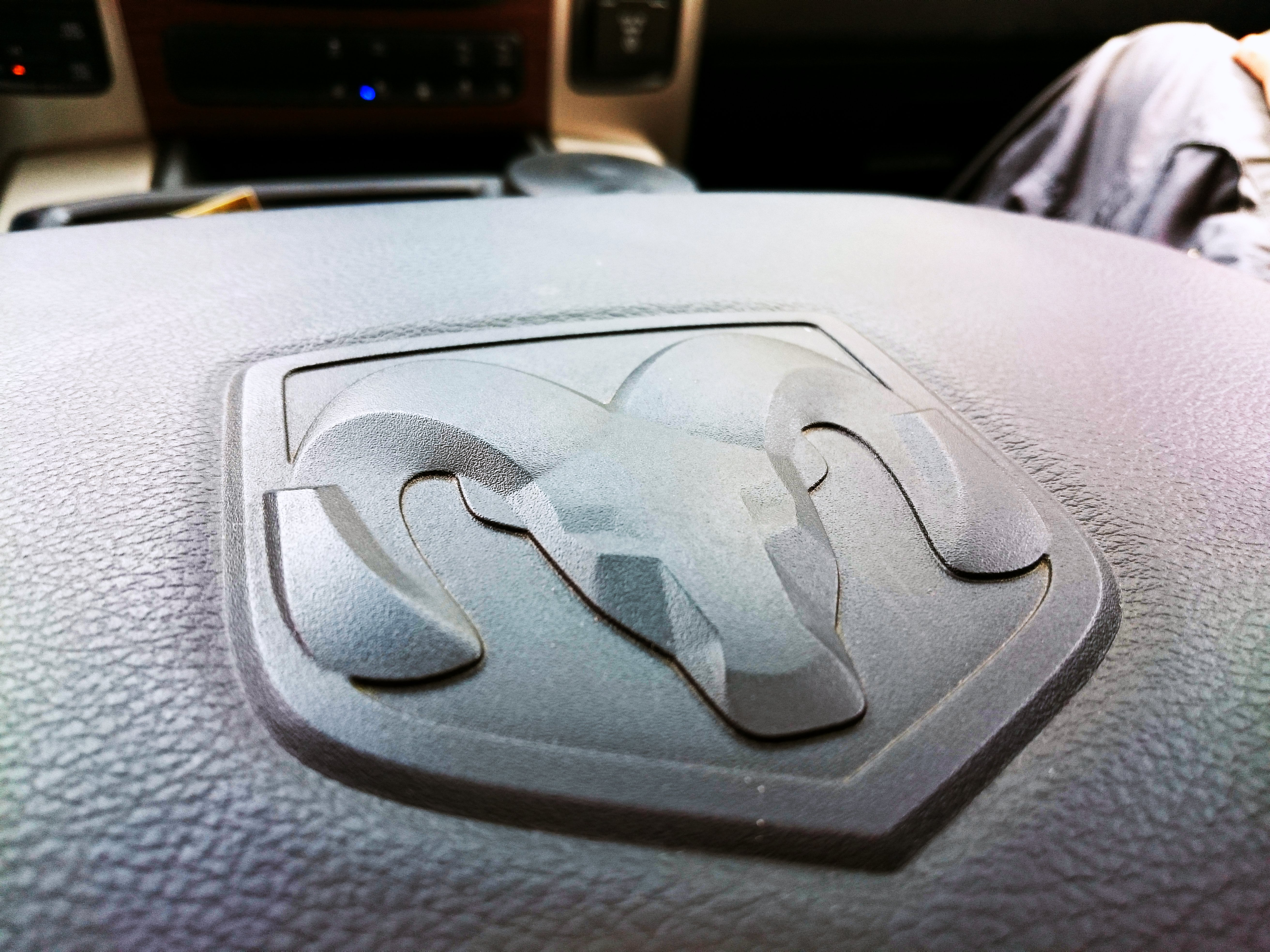
In the 1990s, Chrysler stylised a ram head to use as the emblem for its Dodge division

Divisional logos began to supplant the company-wide Pentastar application in the early 1990s. The Dodge division phased in a ram's-head logo beginning with the 1993 Intrepid and Spirit. The Chrysler brand began using a medallion based on its original logo starting with the 1995 Cirrus, Concorde, and Sebring. This logo was applied to all Chryslers by 1996. That same year, Plymouth adopted a new sailboat logo, which was a simplified version of the brand's pre-Pentastar Mayflower ship logo.

=== Winged logo ===
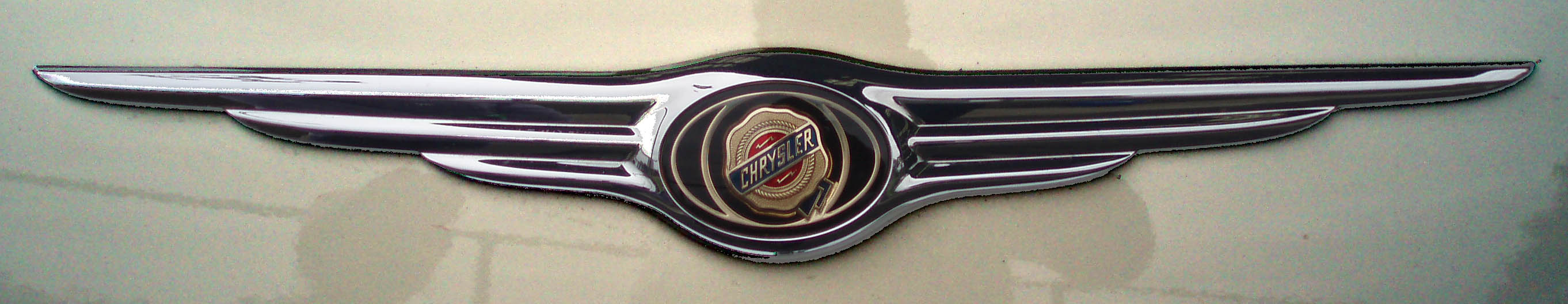
Winged logo introduced in 1997. It featured the 1993 Chrysler emblem on the center

The design shown here is an adaptation of the original medallion logo which Chrysler used on its cars at its inception in 1925. The logo was revived for the Chrysler division in 1997, and is often surrounded by a pair of silver wings. When sold to Cerberus, Chrysler readopted the Pentastar (see above) as their corporate logo, although the winged logo is still used on the cars themselves.

==== Revival of Pentastar ====
The pentastar logo was revived in 2009

On May 17, 2007, an internal email stated that Chrysler was going to revive the Pentastar logo, in updated form, after their split from Daimler. The new three-dimensional Pentastar was formally introduced when Chrysler LLC began doing business as a private company in August 2007. Chrysler cars retained a modified version of the winged logo.

==== 2014–present ====
FCA logo, in use 2014–2021

Stellantis logo, adopted for all the corporation subsidiaries, including Chrysler Group

With the formation of Fiat Chrysler Automobiles in 2014, the stylized letters "FCA" replaced the Pentastar as the official logo. The move angered several Chrysler fans who spawned a Facebook page and a petition drive to save it.

When FCA and the PSA Group merged in 2021 to form Stellantis, Chrysler LLC Group (named "Stellantis North America", officially "FCA US"), adopted the Stellantis brand used worldwide.

== See also ==
- Oilite
- List of Chrysler factories
