= Cowger =

Cowger is a surname. Notable people with the surname include:

- Scott Cowger (born 1959), American politician, innkeeper, and engineer
- William Cowger (1922–1971), American politician
- Gary Leland Cowger (1947–2023), automotive executive
