= Bob Lutz (businessman) =

Swiss-American automotive executive (born 1932)

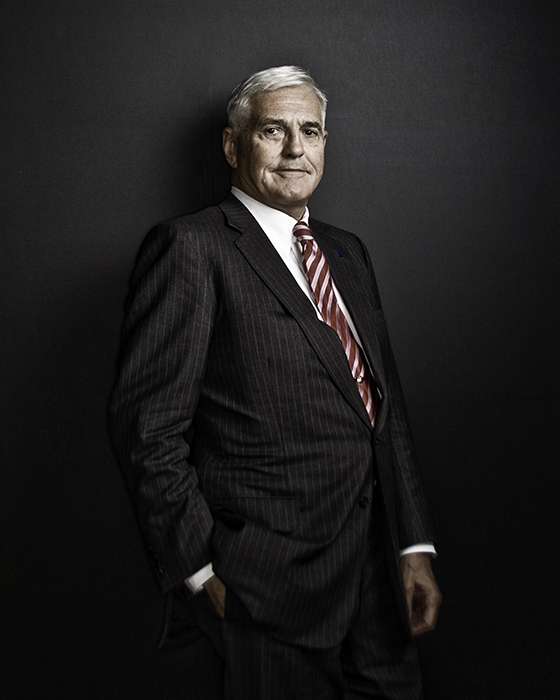
- Lutz in 2008
- Born: Robert Anthony Lutz; February 12, 1932 (age 94); Zurich, Switzerland
- Occupation: Executive

Robert Anthony Lutz (born February 12, 1932) is a Swiss-American automotive executive. He served as a top leader of all of the United States Big Three automobile manufacturers, having been in succession executive vice president (and board member) of Ford Motor Company, president and then vice chairman (and board member) of Chrysler Corporation, and vice chairman of General Motors.

== Early life ==
Lutz was born in Zurich, Switzerland, the son of Margaret and Robert Harry Lutz. His father was a vice chairman of Credit Suisse. Lutz emigrated from Switzerland to the United States aged seven, spending time in Scarsdale, New York, becoming a U.S. citizen in 1943, and returned to Switzerland in 1947 to attend school in Lausanne. He is fluent in English, French, and German. He has modest fluency in Italian.

Lutz received a bachelor's degree in production management in 1961, followed by an MBA with a concentration in marketing with highest honors in 1962, both from the University of California, Berkeley. He earned the latter when he was flying in the United States Marine Corps Reserve's 4th Marine Aircraft Wing and supporting two of four young daughters by selling vacuum cleaners in Walnut Creek, California. He also received an honorary Doctorate of Law from Boston University in 1985, and an honorary degree of Doctor of Management from Kettering University in 2003. He is a trustee of the Marine Corps University Foundation and the Marine Military Academy.

== Professional career ==
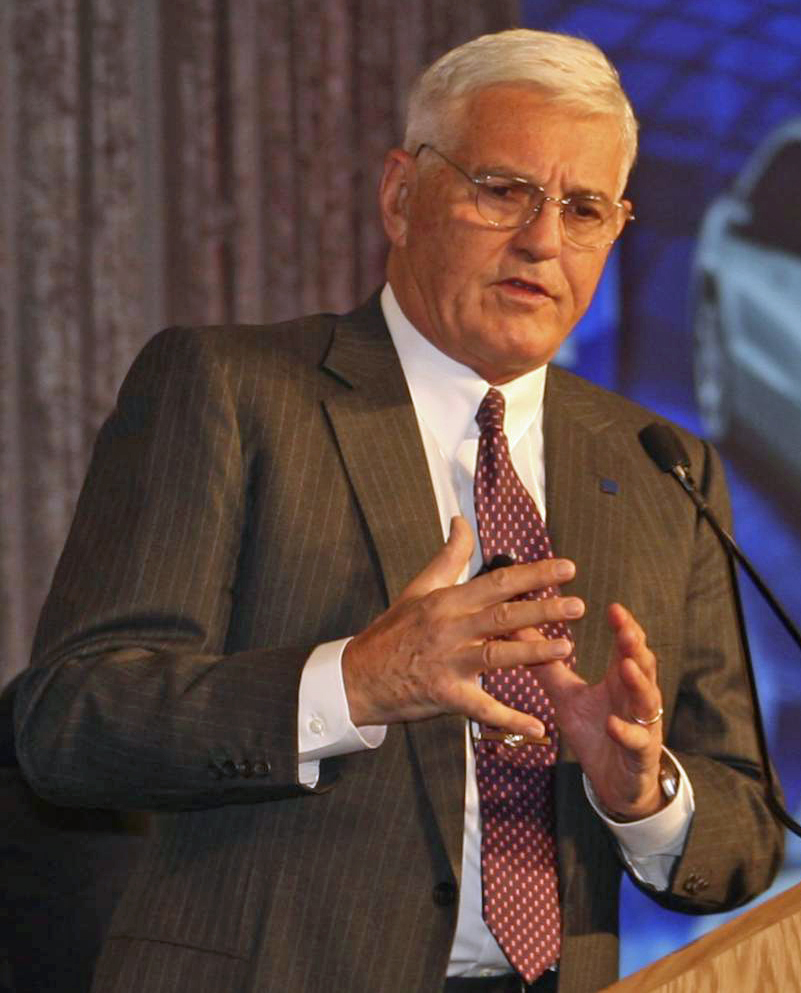
Lutz in 2008

After leaving the Marines, Lutz spent eight years with GM Opel in Europe before joining BMW serving as executive vice president of sales at BMW for three years. He takes some credit in the development of the BMW 3 Series as well as their Motorsport division.

Lutz was also an executive vice president at Ford Motor Company. At Ford of Europe, he led the creation of the Ford Escort III, and Ford Sierra, and upon returning to the US in 1985, initiated development of the original Ford Explorer, and was a member of Ford's board of directors. He was a frequent internal political rival of eventual Ford CEO Red Poling.

Lutz became head of Chrysler Corporation's Global Product Development, including the successful Dodge Viper and LH series cars. Former Chrysler chairman and CEO Lee Iacocca, who helped steer the company back to profitability after receiving loans from private banks backed by the U.S. Government in 1979, said he should have picked Lutz as his successor rather than Bob Eaton upon Iacocca's retirement at the end of 1992, but at the time Iacocca and Lutz were not getting along. Eaton was responsible for the sale of Chrysler to Daimler-Benz in 1998 which Daimler ended up backing out of in 2007 when it sold Chrysler to Cerberus Capital Management. Referring to the job performance of Eaton, Iacocca claimed that Lutz "would eat him for lunch".

While at General Motors, Lutz championed the import of the Holden Monaro to the United States as the Pontiac GTO. Other cars such as the Cadillac Sixteen Concept; Saturn Sky and Pontiac Solstice; Pontiac G8; Chevrolet Malibu; Cadillac CTS; Buick Enclave; Cadillac Converj Concept; Cadillac CTS Coupe Concept; Chevrolet Camaro; Chevy Beat, Groove and Trax Concept Studies; and 2010 Buick Lacrosse, Chevrolet Equinox, and Cadillac SRX are said to be Lutz initiatives. Lutz has also emphasized a need to produce fuel efficient vehicles, backing the 2010 Chevrolet Volt.

Lutz maintained the "Fastlane" blog hosted at GM Blogs.

In 2008, Lutz said that "the electrification of the automobile is inevitable".

On February 9, 2009, GM announced that Lutz would step down on April 1, 2009, from his position as vice chairman of Global Product Development, to take an advisory role. He was to retire from GM at the end of 2009. Lutz said that one reason for his decision was the increasing regulatory climate in Washington that would force GM to produce what federal regulators wanted, rather than what customers wanted. Lutz has expressed skepticism on the issue of global warming.

During a July 10, 2009, press conference, GM stated that Lutz would remain at GM as vice chairman responsible for all creative elements of products and customer relationships and that his role as vice chairman of Global Product Development would be assumed April 1, 2009, by Thomas G. Stephens, then executive vice president of Global Powertrain and Global Quality. Lutz, Stephens, and design chief Ed Welburn would work together to guide all creative aspects of design. Lutz would also lead the effort to better guide GM's brands, and the automaker's marketing, advertising, and communications teams would report to Lutz in an effort to develop a more consistent message and results. Lutz would report directly to Fritz Henderson, and be part of the newly formed executive committee. Lutz retired from General Motors May 2, 2010.

As of 2021, Lutz was head of the consulting firm Lutz Communications. He is also chairman of The New Common School Foundation, a member of the board of trustees for the U.S. Marine Corps University Foundation, and vice chairman of the board of trustees for the Marine Military Academy in Harlingen, Texas. He joined the Transonic Combustion, Inc. board of directors on May 24, 2010.

On August 6, 2012, The NanoSteel Company, a nano-structured steel materials designer, announced an investment by GM Ventures in the company. On October 10, 2012, NanoSteel announced the appointment of Bob Lutz to its board of directors. The Providence, RI-based company said that it "has achieved a significant breakthrough in the development of nano-structured sheet steel with exceptional strength and ductility" for the automotive industry.

In 2015, Lutz was honored with an Edison Achievement Award for his commitment to innovation throughout his career.

In late-2017 Lutz wrote an article for Automotive News predicting upheaval within the car manufacturing industry, anticipating large-scale fleet ownership, removal of dealerships and an eventual ban on human driving of vehicles for transport.

=== Chronology of career & positions ===
- United States Marine Corps, active duty Naval Aviator 1954 to 1959; flew with the Marine Corps Reserve's 4th Marine Aircraft Wing until 1965.
- General Motors—Lutz began his automotive career at GM in September 1963, where he held senior leadership positions in Europe until December 1971.
- BMW—1971 to 1974, executive vice president of Global Sales and Marketing at BMW in Munich, and a member of that company's board of management.
- Ford—1974 to 1986, where his last position was executive vice president of truck operations. He also served as chairman of Ford of Europe and as executive vice president of Ford International Operations (1982–86), as well as a member, Ford board of directors (1982–86).
- Executive at Chrysler Corporation—1986 to 1998. Lutz began his service with Chrysler in 1986 as executive vice president and was shortly thereafter elected to the Chrysler Corporation board. Lutz led all of Chrysler's automotive activities, including sales, marketing, product development, manufacturing, and procurement and supply. Lutz also served as president and chief operating officer, responsible for Chrysler's car and truck operations worldwide.
- CEO of Exide—1998 to 2002. Lutz was chairman and chief executive officer of Exide Technologies. He served as chairman until his resignation on May 17, 2002, and as a member of Exide's board of directors until May 5, 2004.
- General Motors 2001 to 2010. Lutz rejoined GM on September 1, 2001, as vice chairman of Product Development. On November 13, 2001, he was named chairman of GM North America and served in that capacity until April 4, 2005, when he assumed responsibility for Global Product Development. He also served as President of GM Europe on an interim basis from March to June 2004. On April 1, 2009, Lutz was named vice chairman/senior advisor providing strategic input into GM's Global Design and Key Product initiatives, a position he held until retirement at the end of 2009. He agreed to join the new GM at his current position. On July 23, 2009, he was appointed vice chairman, marketing and communications, and on December 4, 2009, named vice chairman, special advisor design and global product development. On May 1, 2010, Lutz retired from GM; but was retained again by GM in September 2011.
- Lutz Communications 2010 to present. Founder and head of Lutz Communication, which he describes as "a universal business consulting firm with an emphasis on businesses in motion."
- VIA Motors 2011 to present. Joined as chairman of the board.
- VLF Automotive 2013 to present. Founded the company alongside Gilbert Villarreal.

== Bibliography ==
- Guts: The Seven Laws of Business That Made Chrysler the World's Hottest Car Company, 1998 ISBN 0471295612
- Guts: 8 Laws of Business from One of the Most Innovative Business Leaders of Our Time. 2003 ISBN 0471463221
- Car Guys vs. Bean Counters: The Battle for the Soul of American Business by Bob Lutz, 2011 ASIN B0056XQGLS
- Icons and Idiots: Straight Talk on Leadership, 2014 ISBN 159184696X

Lutz has authored four books. Guts: the 7 Laws of Business that Made Chrysler the World's Hottest Car Company in 1998, later revised in 2003 to the management and leadership book, Guts: 8 Laws of Business from One of the Most Innovative Business Leaders of Our Time is partially based on his experience as a US Marine Corps aviator. His 2011 book, Car Guys vs. Bean Counters: The Battle for the Soul of American Business, is about his experiences in the US automobile industry. It attained third place in the New York Times "Business Hardcover" category and fifth on the Wall Street Journal list. His 2013 book, Icons and Idiots: Straight Talk on Leadership is about his personal experiences with leaders and their leadership talents and foibles. It is a compendium from Lutz's more than sixty years of observation of inspirational leaders and an analysis of what made the great ones successful at what they did.

== Personal life ==
Lutz is known as a collector of classic automobiles and military jets. Among other aircraft, he owned and piloted an Aero L-39 Albatros (an advanced Czechoslovak jet fighter trainer) and an MD-500 helicopter. Further, he maintained a collection of motorcycles that included a Suzuki Hayabusa, a BMW K1200RS, a BMW K1200S, a BMW R1100S, a BMW K-1 and a BMW HP2 Sport.

Bob Lutz is married to Terri (Smith) Lutz and both reside at their home in Ann Arbor, MI; along with their adoptive four-legged family; which includes, two pigs, one dog and three cats (inside); along with Rowan (horse) and Cassie (rescue donkey) outside.

Children: (first marriage) four daughters: Jacqueline Lutz-Geiger {Greg Geiger}, Caroline Lutz-Mannelli, Catherine Lutz-Houlden {Tom Houlden}, Alexandra (Lutz) Bernardi {Andrew Bernardi}.

His younger brother Mark A. Lutz is a retired economics professor.

Lutz was featured in the 2007 coffee table book published by Motorbooks International [(The Quarto Group]), "Motor City Dream Garages." Chapter 2, "Maximum Bob's Car Park," features Lutz's car collection near Ann Arbor, Michigan. Rex Roy, of Detroit, is the book's author.

Lutz was interviewed in the 2011 documentary, Revenge of the Electric Car.

In 2012, Lutz reconfirmed his skepticism of the scientific consensus on climate change during an interview by Bill Maher. Lutz is an advocate for electric cars and higher petroleum taxes, despite this.

== See also ==
- Rick Wagoner
- Fritz Henderson
