= Transonic Combustion =

Transonic Combustion, Inc.
- Type: Incorporated
- Industry: Automotive
- Founded: 1 January 2006
- Headquarters: Los Angeles, CA
- Key people: Wolfgang Bullmer, President and CEO
- Products: Supercritical Fuel Injection Systems
- Website: tscombustion.com

Transonic Combustion Inc. is a Los Angeles-based cleantech company that is developing supercritical fuel injection systems that enable injection ignition in internal combustion engines.

On October 25, 2010, Transonic presented a technical paper detailing its novel injection ignition combustion process at the SAE 2010 Powertrain Fuels and Lubricants Meeting in San Diego CA.

On September 1, 2010, the World Economic Forum announced the company as a Technology Pioneer for 2011.

As of March 2015, Transonic's website was defunct, and in April 2015 the facilities were up for auction.
