= Robert James Eaton =

American businessman

- Born: Buena Vista, Colorado, U.S.
- Education: University of Kansas (BS)
- Occupation: Businessman

Robert James "Bob" Eaton (born February 13, 1940) is an American businessman. He served as chairman and chief executive officer of Chrysler Corporation.

== Early life ==
Eaton was born in Buena Vista, Colorado and was raised in Arkansas City, Kansas. He graduated with a B.S. degree in mechanical engineering from the University of Kansas in 1963. He was a member of Kappa Sigma fraternity.

== Career ==
Eaton joined General Motors upon graduation. In 1973, he was appointed chief engineer of GM's new front-wheel-drive X-body cars. In 1982 he was promoted to the post of vice president of advanced engineering before being named president of GM Europe in 1988. Chrysler Corporation CEO Lee Iacocca found Eaton and hired him to be his successor as CEO. This was a controversial decision because Bob Lutz had been Iacocca's expected successor. Iacocca later admitted that Lutz would have been the better choice as his successor.

Eaton was the chairman and CEO of Chrysler from 1993 until 1998. In that position, he was responsible for the sale of Chrysler Corporation to Daimler-Benz, which formed DaimlerChrysler.

Eaton was elected as a member into the National Academy of Engineering (NAE) in 1989 for leading design and development of modern front-wheel-drive, body-frame-integral automobiles and for introducing advanced automotive manufacturing techniques. He was also a chairman of the NAE.

He was elected a director of Chevron in September 2000. Eaton has served on the board of International Paper. He is a trustee of the University of Kansas Endowment Association.

== Awards ==
- 1994: Distinguished Service Citation from the University of Kansas Alumni Association
- 1994: Man of the Year from the Kappa Sigma Fraternity
- 1995: Distinguished Engineering Service Award from the University of Kansas School of Engineering
- 1995: Golden Plate Award of the American Academy of Achievement
- 2005: Inducted into the University of Kansas Business Hall of Fame
