= Gary Leland Cowger =

American executive

- Born: Gary Leland Cowger; April 18, 1947; Kansas City, Kansas, U.S.
- Died: February 17, 2023 (aged 75); Plano, Texas, U.S.
- Education: Kettering University
- Occupation: Manufacturing executive

Gary L. Cowger (April 18, 1947 to February 17, 2023) was an American executive who was President of General Motors North America from 2001 to 2005.

== Life ==
Gary Cowger, an only child, was born and raised in Kansas City, Kansas. After completing high school he majored in Industrial engineering at what was then known as the General Motors Institute, now Kettering University, also in Kansas City.

After a management degree from Massachusetts Institute of Technology in 1978, he worked at a variety of managerial positions within General Motors.

International postings followed in the 1990s. Cowger also mentored Mary Barra, future General Motors CEO.

He received the S.M. Wu Foundation’s Manufacturing Leadership Award (2001), the Society of Automotive Engineers Manufacturing Leadership Award (2003), the Automotive Industries’ Executive of the Year (2004), and the M. Eugene Merchant Manufacturing Medal from the American Society of Mechanical Engineers (2010). He was a Stanford University Fellow (2006), and he was awarded honorary doctorates from Lindenwood University in 2002 and Kettering University in 2007. In 2006 he was elected to the National Academy of Engineering.

After retiring in 2009, Cowger and his wife moved to Texas to be closer to their children.
