= Jim Press =

- Born: October 4, 1946 Age 78; Pasadena, California, United States
- Education: Pittsburg State University (1968)
- Occupation: Executive Vice President of The McLarty Companies
- Children: Robert Press, Jason Press, Christopher Press, Elizabeth Press, Guy Press, Nong Press

James E. Press is the former deputy CEO of Chrysler Group LLC, having served in that capacity from June to December 2009. Previously, he served as president of sales and marketing operations of Chrysler LLC from September 2007 to June 2009. He also served as senior advisor to Chrysler Financial Company. During this assignment, he assisted Sergio Marchionne in the transition to Fiat. Press was heavily involved in maintaining company operations and product development during the bankruptcy period. Press was also senior advisor to the Renault–Nissan Alliance, working closely with the CEO, Carlos Ghosn. Presently he is senior advisor to Hyundai Motor North America, AMCI Doppler in Torrance, California and Work Truck Solutions in Chico California.

== Career ==
After starting his career at Ford, he joined Toyota in 1970 and rose steadily in the organization, serving in most key executive positions before being named COO of Toyota Motor North America, the consolidating company for all sales, finance, manufacturing, design and engineering activities of one of the largest auto companies in the world. Press served in that role until September 2007. He was also the first non-Japanese member of Toyota's board of directors.

Press served as Executive Vice President/Senior Advisor to The McLarty Companies until December 31, 2020; a fourth-generation family transportation business based in Little Rock, Arkansas. Previously, Press served as a senior executive for three international ventures founded and established by Mark McLarty: Yanjun Auto Group, a leading luxury auto dealership chain in China; Caltibiano McLarty, a multidealer group based in Brazil; and GDV Imports, the Jaguar Land Rover distributor in Mexico. Later, Press was President of RML Automotive, a private, Dallas, Texas-based U.S. automotive dealer group established by Robert L. Johnson, Mack McLarty, Franklin McLarty, and Steve Landers.

== Personal life ==
Press was born in Pasadena, California. After his second marriage ended in divorce, in 2006 he was remarried to Suwichada Busamrong from Thailand. Press and his wife live in Hermosa Beach, California, and have six children; Robert Press, Jason Press, Christopher Press, Elizabeth Press, Guy Press, and Nong Press.

Press is known to be an avid swimmer. He wears a single string on one wrist as a reminder that material wealth is not the most important thing.
