= ASOTRECOL =

Colombian association

The Association of Injured Workers and Ex-Workers of General Motors Colmotores (ASOTRECOL) is a Colombian association whose stated goal is to protect the rights of General Motors (GM) workers and ex-workers and to denounce rights abuses allegedly committed by GM in Colombia.

== Background ==
ASOTRECOL is a group of 68 current and former workers at GM Colmotores, GM's Colombian subsidiary, which formed on May 19, 2011. ASOTRECOL set up a shelter in front of the U.S. Embassy in Colombia's capital, Bogotá, on August 2, 2011. After a year of peaceful protest, several members sewed their mouths closed and initiated a hunger strike on August 1, 2012. The association's members were fired by GM after they incurred injuries while working at its Bogotá plant and received no medical benefits or severance. They are seeking a solution with GM Colmotores that would include compensation for medical costs and reintegration into GM's workforce.

== Disputes ==
=== ASOTRECOL's Claims ===
ASOTRECOL alleges that its members incurred work-related injuries at the GM plant, and that GM illegally fired workers who were consequently unable to perform their work. ASTORECOL's 68 members suffer from various injuries associated with strenuous, repetitive motions, including: musculoskeletal problems, herniated discs, carpal tunnel, elbow and shoulder tendonitis, tinnitus (chronic ringing in the ears), elbow epicondylitis, knee problems, cancer, and spinal injuries. Many have undergone multiple surgeries. GM Colmotores denies all claims, asserting that its number one priority is the health and well-being of its workers.

=== ASOTRECOL's Demands ===
ASOTRECOL's demands are that GM agree to: 1) recognize members' injuries as occupational, 2) assume the costs of the corresponding medical treatment, 3) pay pensions or disability to those who are so severely injured that they can no longer work or can only work part-time, and 4) compensate workers for the economic damage that they have suffered, including lost wages and lost homes. GM alleges that ASOTRECOL members' claims are unfounded, and refuses to resolve their dispute. GM and ASOTRECOL have engaged in mediation five times to date, and GM unilaterally withdrew from the latest one, held on August 6.

== International support ==
ASOTRECOL has received widespread support from civil society groups within Colombia and across the United States. Labor unions and organizations, including the AFL-CIO, United Auto Workers, United Steelworkers, Labor Notes, and U.S. Labor Education in the Americas Project, have all issued statements in solidarity with ASOTRECOL. Human rights organizations, such as Witness for Peace, the Washington Office on Latin America, the Latin America Working Group, have also expressed support for ASOTRECOL and advocated for a resolution to its case.

People across the United States have shown support for ASOTRECOL by fasting in solidarity with the hunger strikers or by holding protests.
