= Welch Motor Car Company =

American car manufacturer (1901–1912)

The Welch Motor Company
- Formerly: Chelsea Manufacturing Company; The Welch Motor Car Co.
- Type: Private (1901–10); Subsidiary (1910–11)
- Industry: Automotive
- Founded: 1901
- Founder: A.R. Welch
- Defunct: 1911; 115 years ago
- Fate: Acquired by General Motors and merged to it
- Headquarters: Chelsea, MI (1903–4); Pontiac, MI (March 1904–11), USA
- Products: Automobiles

The Welch Motor Company was an American automobile company headquartered in Chelsea, Michigan. It began in 1901 and continued production of luxury vehicles until 1911 when it merged with General Motors.

== History ==
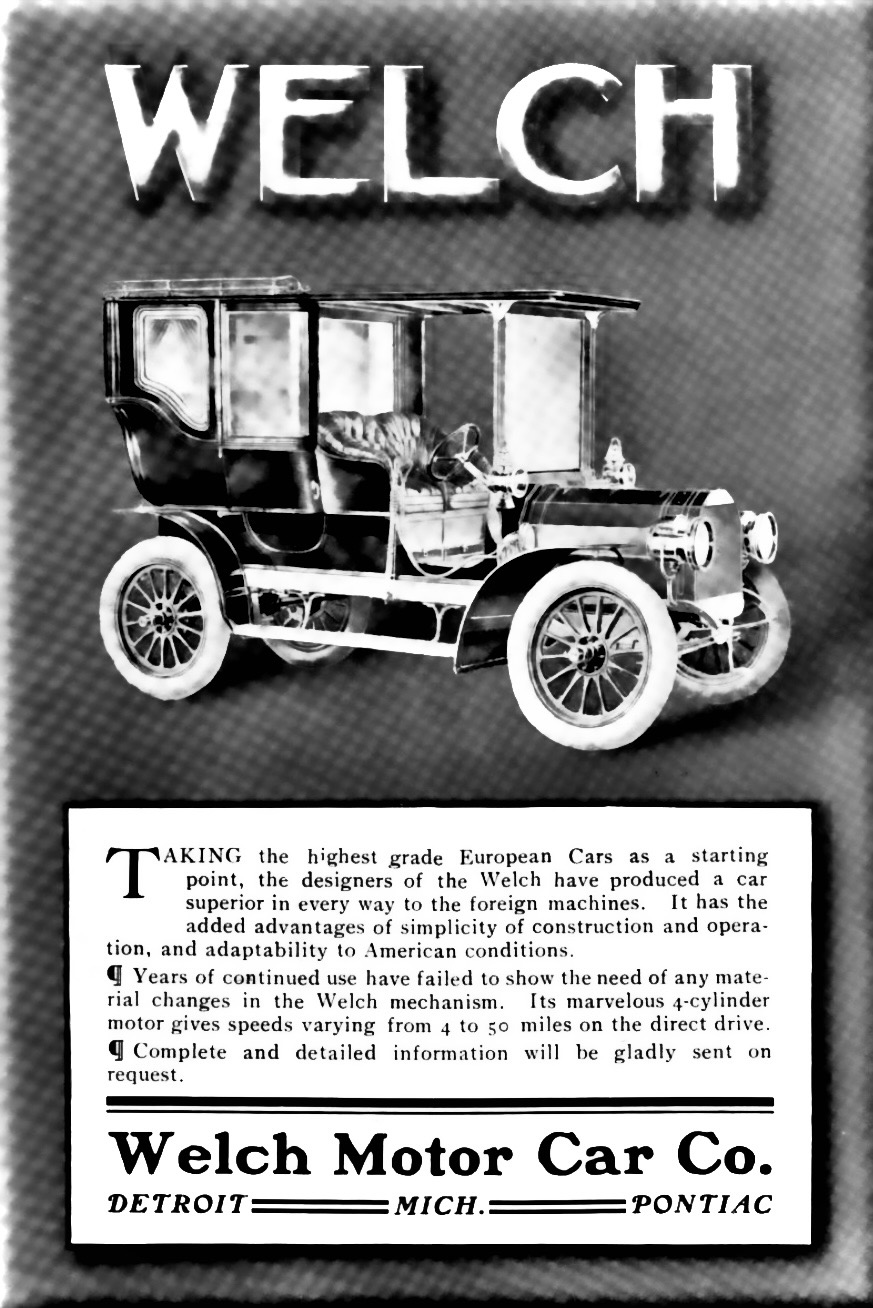
Welch Model C (1905)

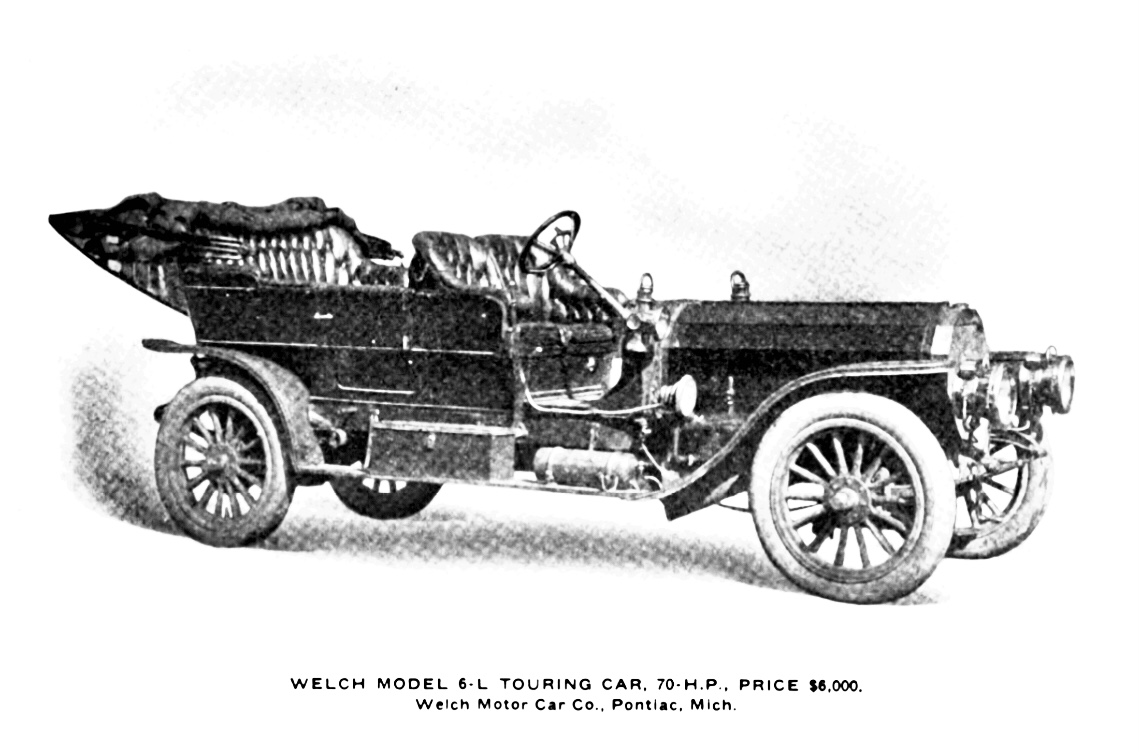
Welch Model 6 L (1908)

A.R. Welch started working at a stove factory in Chelsea, Michigan before resigning in 1895 to take charge of a metal-working factory. A.R. and his younger brother Fred started building and testing water-cooled engines in 1898, and by April 1901, the brothers had completed construction and successfully ran their first motor wagon, powered by their two-cylinder, 20-horsepower engine. A. R. Welch and Fred Welch started out as bicycle manufacturers.

With limited financial support from J.D. Watson, their "Chelsea Manufacturing Company" (which they had initially established to produce small metal components) began assembling vehicles. In January 1903, they shipped their first production automobile to Chicago for an exhibition.

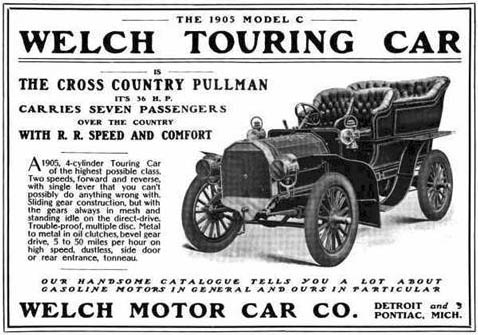
Welch Touring Car ad, 1905

The company went through a number of name changes and locations. It was called "The Chelsea Mfg. Co." based in Chelsea, Michigan, from 1903 to 1904. It became "The Welch Motor Car Co." based in Pontiac, Michigan, 43 mi (69.2 km) east, from 1904 to 1911 on the west end of Osmun Street. The company moved to Detroit from 1909 to 1911.

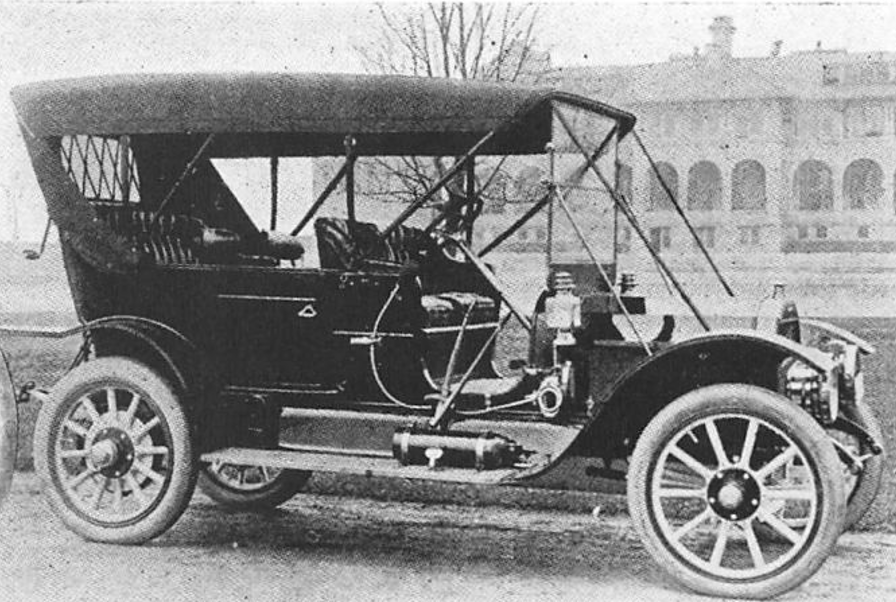
Welch-Detroit 1909 Model S

The first car, the Welch Tourist, had some innovations. The steering column telescoped for the driver, and an unusual two-speed transmission with all gears always in mesh was incorporated. Multiple-disc clutches within the transmission were used to select that gear that was to give the power to stop the grinding of the gears on shifting. The Welch two-cylinder vertical engine was probably the first to use a spherical combustion chamber.

Welch thought that this shape would produce the most rapid and efficient combustion. Unfortunately, the concave shape of the piston top collected cylinder lubrication, so a flat top piston was substituted, changing the combustion chamber to hemispherical.

The Welch Motor Car Company was the first American car company to introduce an overhead cam shaft. It used the overhead cam to operate both the intake and exhaust valves per cylinder.

Shaft drive coupled power to the rear wheels, and a honeycomb radiator was used for engine cooling. Dry cells and coil provided the jump-spark ignition. Inadequate financing soon forced the company into bankruptcy. Early in 1904, with financial assistance from Arthur Pack and George Hodges, the Chelsea firm was reorganized as the Welch Motor Car Company. Its first factory was established in Pontiac, and a second plant soon after in another part of Detroit. The Tourist name was dropped, and the Pontiac cars were named Welch; the Detroit cars were called either Welch or Welch Detroit.

The Welch brothers did not take the usual approach of putting their cars into races to win sales. They believed that the market would want reliable, well-built, and luxuriously- appointed vehicles of high quality, which would provide assured, comfortable and steady performance overall road conditions. So their cars were priced at US$3,500 ($125,417 in 2025 dollars).

Rear- and side-entrance tonneau bodies were produced in 1904, carrying capacity as large as seven passengers. Engine size was increased to four cylinders. The company extended the wheelbase of the chassis. The cars had three oil lamps, but gas lamps and acetylene tanks could be provided as an option, as were top and windshield.

== Body styles ==
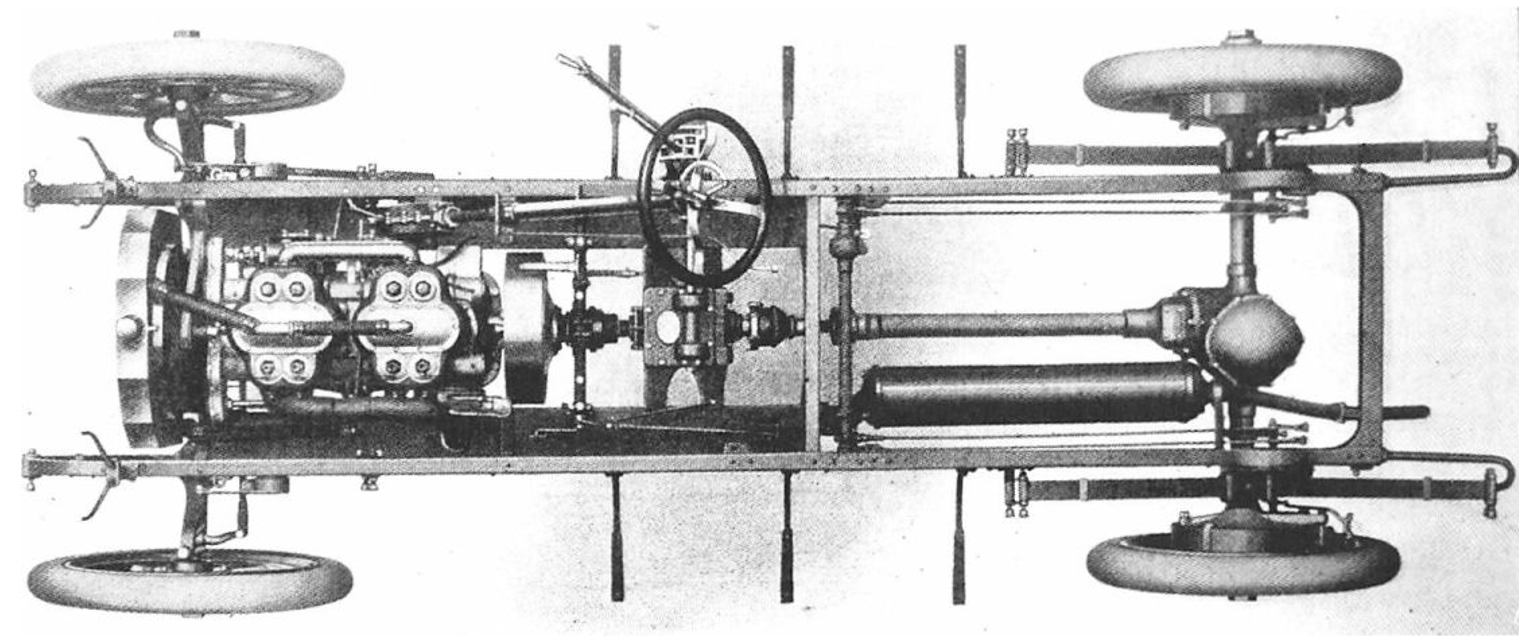
Welch 1911 Chassis

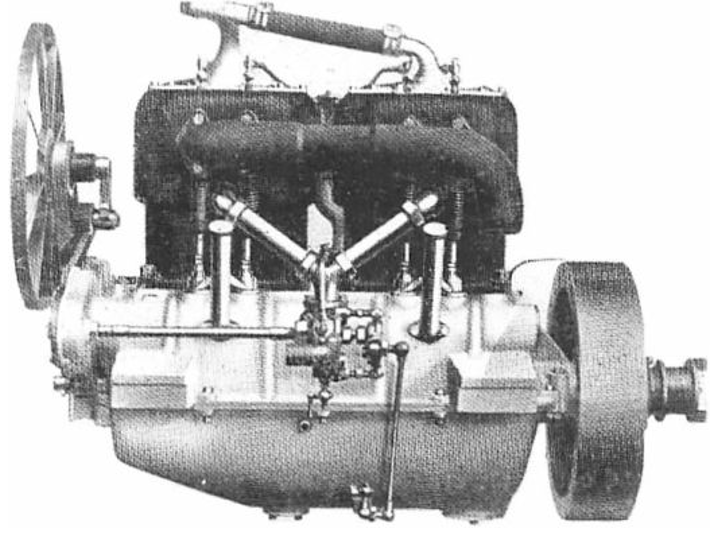
Welch-Detroit 1911 engine

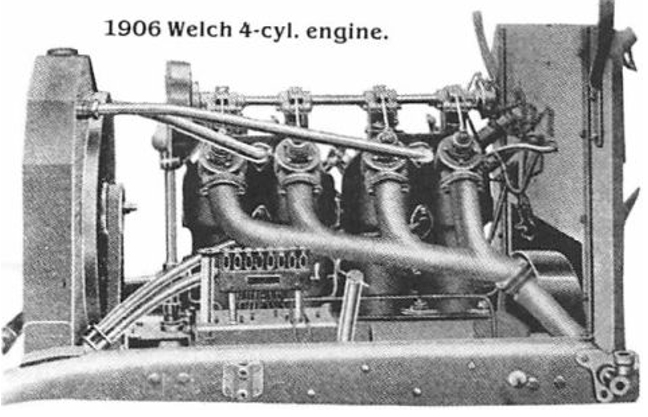
Welch 1906 4 cyc engine

In 1905, the limousine, side-entrance tonneau, canopy top, Victoria, and landaulette body styles were available. The four-cylinder engine was mostly unchanged, but the bore was increased. The chassis was lengthened. Wheel-balance weights were incorporated between spoke pairs. Standard equipment was expanded to include two acetylene lamps. The jump-spark ignition incorporated a large bronze distributor located on the dash, so the individual spark jumps were clearly visible to the driver and passengers. The cooling fan of the second 1905 chassis—located directly behind the honeycomb radiator—was belt-driven from the crankshaft. Located within the radiator and driven directly from the cooling fan shaft, the water pump forced the fluid to flow from the upper portion to the lower portion of the radiator.

A removable top introduced in 1906 became a cape top for summer use, a half-limousine top in the fall, and a Pullman limousine in winter.

The Welch brothers announced their intention to produce 150 expensive cars for 1907. Although the four-cylinder cars would remain essentially unchanged, these new larger six-cylinder machines would be priced as high as $7,000. The new engine consisted mainly of three pairs of cylinder castings, the same size as the two pairs used in the four-cylinder machines.

The Welch brothers had previously insisted that a three-speed transmission was unnecessary in an automobile of adequate power, and certainly, Welch vehicles had sufficient power. The two-speed transmission was finally modified to provide a third speed. However, this modification resulted in an additional reverse gear because of the unusual characteristics of their transmission, making the Welch one of the very few automobiles with two reverse speeds.

These two chassis were carried over into the 1908 season with minimum modification. A double ignition system was incorporated using both a Bosch high tension magneto and a battery and coil. The systems were independent and ignited separate spark plugs. A conventional three-speed sliding selective transmission, with a single reverse, was introduced, beginning with the 1909 models. Although the six-cylinder roadster employed a transaxle (transmission located at the differential), the remaining models continued to have the transmission located mid-chassis.

The six-cylinder Touring car had a very long hood, ornate multiple twist horn, acetylene tank, zig-zag windshield, separate step leading up to the rear seat, sweeping front fenders, and long sloping top straps. A four-cylinder baby tonneau was also offered, this with a shortened wheelbase.

The standard four-cylinder and six-cylinder chassis were both continued into the 1910 season, a new higher-powered four-cylinder chassis known as the model R, was also introduced. Still another smaller machine, the model S, was introduced for 1911, this engine cast in pairs and with two camshafts located within the crankcase. Dual ignition continued in use, but with Remy magneto instead of Bosch. The large, powerful six-cylinder chassis was discontinued after the 1910 season.

The Model T soon replaced the Model S, with the addition of detachable four doors, change to a cone clutch, and the use once again of the Bosch dual magneto. The T-head engine employed large valves two inches in diameter. The water pump, no longer housed within the radiator, was now located on the crankcase. A Schebler carburetor replaced the earlier Welch units. Large 36-inch tires were mounted on quick-detachable rims. Colors were royal blue or green, with gray wheels, or solid blue or solid green throughout. The touring car price of $3,100 ($4,000 for the limousine ($138,214 in 2025 dollars) included all lamps and tools as well as the top, windshield, curtains, tire cover, shock absorbers, speedometer, and clock.

== Model overview ==
Year	Model	Cylinder	Power(PS)	Wheelbase (cm)	Body
1903–1904	Tourist	2	20	198	Runabout, Tonneau
1905	30/36 HP ( Model C)	4	30/36	290	Side Entrance Tonneau, Limousine, Canopy Top Touring, Victoria, Landaulette
1906	Model D	4	50	300	5 seater touring, Limousine
1906	Model F	4	50	300	5 seater touring
1907	Model D	4	50	300	5 seater touring, Limousine
1907	Model E	4	50	284	Runabout
1907	Model F	4	50	315	5 seater touring
1907	Model G	4	50	328	5 seater touring
1907	Model H	6	70	351	5 seater touring
1907	Model I	4	50	328	Limousine
1908	Model 4-I	4	50	328	Limousine
1908	Model 4-L	4	50	328	7 seater touring
1908	Model 6-I	6	70	351	Limousine
1908	Model 6-L	6	70	351	7 seater touring
1909	Model 4-I	4	50	318	Limousine, Landaulet, Town Car 6-sitter
1909	Model 4-L	4	50	318	7 seater touring
1909	Model 4-M	4	50	305	Baby Tonneau
1909	Model 6-I	6	75	351	Limousine, Landaulet, Town Car
1909	Model 6-L	6	75	351	7 seater touring
1909	Model 6-M	6	75	351	Baby Tonneau
1910	Model 4-L	4	50	318	Limousine 7-seater
1910	Model 4-N	4	50	318	7 seater touring
1910	Model 4-R	4	70	330	7 seater touring
1910	Model 6-N	6	75	351	7 seater touring
1911	Model 4-R	4	70	330	7 seater touring

== Demise ==
General Motors Corporation was busy acquiring numerous automobile firms. Welch cars, with their many innovative and patented features, attracted GM's attention. By mid-1910, the Welch Motor Car Company was purchased by GM and its name changed to "The Welch Company of Detroit".

The Pontiac plant was abandoned, and its resources were moved to Detroit, where both 40- and 50-hp machines were to be built. All Welch automobiles would be sold fully equipped to increase their value. The model T was to have become the model W for 1912, with a black hood, fenders, and underbody, and black-enameled lamps set against a maroon body color.
