= General Motors Japan =

Japanese automobile manufacturer subsidiary

General Motors Japan Limited
- Type: Subsidiary
- Industry: Automotive
- Founded: 1927; 99 years ago
- Headquarters: Shinagawa, Tokyo, Japan
- Key people: Tad Wakamatsu (Director)
- Products: Automobiles
- Brands: Cadillac; Chevrolet
- Parent: General Motors
- Website: gmjapan.co.jp

General Motors Japan, Ltd. is a Japanese company that specializes in automobile imports and previously automobile production. It is the Japanese subsidiary of the American company General Motors.

== History ==
General Motors built a factory in Osaka in 1927 where Knock-down kits of Chevrolet, Pontiac, Oldsmobile and Buick vehicles were shipped from the United States and assembled locally. From 1925 to 1935, the Japanese car market was dominated by American manufacturers (alongside GM since 1925 Ford and since 1930 also Chrysler). In 1930, the combined market share of Ford and General Motors was 95%. During its presence (1927-1939), General Motors had a market share of 42 percent. Among the produced models was the brand Chevrolet. As a result of a new law in 1936, according to which existing foreign companies were not allowed to increase their annual production further, further economic and political factors led to General Motors (like other American manufacturers) withdrawing from the Japanese market in 1939.

The refoundation of General Motors Japan, Ltd. in Tokyo took place in 2001.
