= General Motors =

American multinational automotive company

General Motors Company

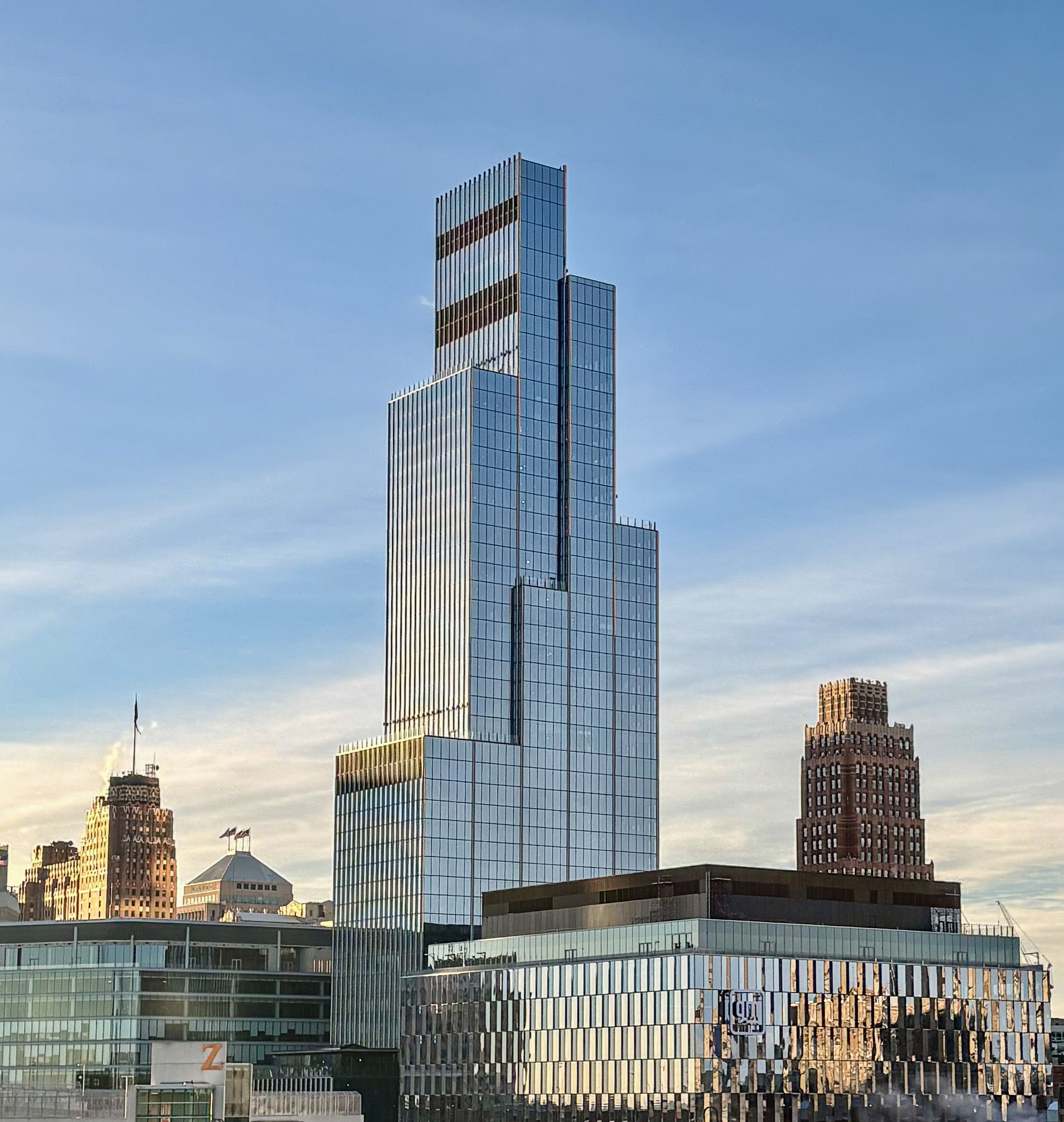
- Headquarters at Hudson's Detroit in Detroit, Michigan, in 2026
- Type: Public
- Traded as: NYSE: GM; S&P 100 component; S&P 500 component
- ISIN: US37045V1008
- Industry: Automotive
- Predecessor: General Motors Corporation
- Founded: September 16, 1908; 118 years ago (original company); July 10, 2009; 17 years ago (present company)
- Chair & CEO: Mary Barra
- President: Mark Reuss
- Founder: William C. Durant
- Headquarters: Hudson's Detroit, Detroit, Michigan, U.S.
- Number of locations: 396 facilities on six continents
- Area served: Worldwide
- Key people: Pierre S. du Pont Chairman (1915–1929); Charles Kettering Director of Research (1920–1947); Alfred P. Sloan CEO (1923–1946) Chairman (1937–1956)
- Products: Automobiles; Performance vehicles; Luxury vehicles; Commercial vehicles; Military vehicles; Automobile parts
- Production output: ▲6,184,000 vehicles (2025)
- Brands: Chevrolet; Buick; GMC; Cadillac
- Services: Automotive finance; Vehicle leasing; Vehicle service
- Revenue: ▼US$185.0 billion (2025)
- Operating income: ▼US$2.909 billion (2025)
- Net income: ▼US$2.697 billion (2025)
- Total assets: ▲US$281.3 billion (2025)
- Total equity: ▼US$61.12 billion (2025)
- Number of employees: 156,000 (2025)
- Subsidiaries: Financial services: GM Financial; GM Insurance; Logistics: GM Certified Service; GM Energy; GM Fleet; OnStar; Industrial: ACDelco; DMAX; GM Components Holdings; GM Defense; GM Performance Power Units; GM Subsystems Manufacturing LLC; Ultium Cells LLC; International: Cadillac Europe; GM Argentina; GM Brazil; GM Canada; GM Chile; GM Colombia; GM Egypt; GM Japan; GM Korea; GM Mexico; GM New Zealand; GM Specialty Vehicles (GMSV); GM Technical Center Korea; Pan Asia Technical Automotive Center (50%); SAIC-GM (50%); SAIC-GM-Wuling (44%); SGMW Motor Indonesia
- Website: gm.com

General Motors Company (GM) is an American multinational automotive manufacturing company headquartered in Detroit, Michigan, United States. The company is most known for owning and manufacturing four automobile brands: Chevrolet, Buick, GMC, and Cadillac, each a separate division of GM. By total sales, it has continuously been the largest automaker in the United States, and was the largest in the world for 77 years before losing the title to Toyota in 2008.

General Motors operates manufacturing plants in eight countries. In addition to its four core brands, GM also holds interests in Chinese brands Baojun and Wuling via SAIC-GM-Wuling Automobile. GM further owns a namesake defense vehicles division which produces military vehicles for the United States government and military, the vehicle safety, security, and information services provider OnStar, the auto parts company ACDelco, and a namesake financial lending service.

The company originated as a holding company for Buick established on September 16, 1908, by William C. Durant. The current entity was established in 2009 after the General Motors Chapter 11 reorganization.

As of 2024, General Motors ranks 25th by total revenue out of all American companies on the Fortune 500 and 50th on the Fortune Global 500. In 2023, the company was ranked 70th in the Forbes Global 2000. In 2021, GM announced its intent to end production of vehicles using internal combustion engines by 2035, as part of its plan to achieve carbon neutrality by 2040. These plans were mostly scaled back in 2025.

== History ==
=== Founding and consolidation ===
By 1900, William C. Durant's Durant-Dort Carriage Company of Flint, Michigan, had become the largest manufacturer of horse-drawn vehicles in the United States. Durant was averse to automobiles, but fellow Flint businessman James H. Whiting, owner of Flint Wagon Works, sold him the Buick Motor Company in 1904. Durant formed the General Motors Company in 1908 as a holding company, borrowing a naming convention from General Electric. GM's first acquisition was Buick, which Durant already owned, then Olds Motor Works on November 12, 1908. Under Durant, GM went on to acquire Cadillac, Elmore, Welch, Cartercar, Oakland (the predecessor of Pontiac), the Rapid Motor Vehicle Company of Pontiac, Michigan, and the Reliance Motor Car Company of Detroit, Michigan (predecessor of GMC) in 1909.

Durant, with the board's approval, also tried acquiring Ford Motor Company in 1909, for $8 million, but the banks refused to lend him the initial $2 million down payment. Durant over-leveraged GM in making acquisitions, and was removed by the board of directors in 1910 at the order of the bankers who backed the loans to keep GM in business. The action of the bankers was partially influenced by the Panic of 1910–1911 that followed the earlier enforcement of the Sherman Antitrust Act of 1890. In 1911, Charles F. Kettering of Dayton Engineering Laboratories Company (DELCO) and Henry M. Leland invented and patented the first electric starter in America. In November 1911, Durant co-founded Chevrolet with race car driver Louis Chevrolet, who left the company in 1915 after a disagreement with Durant.

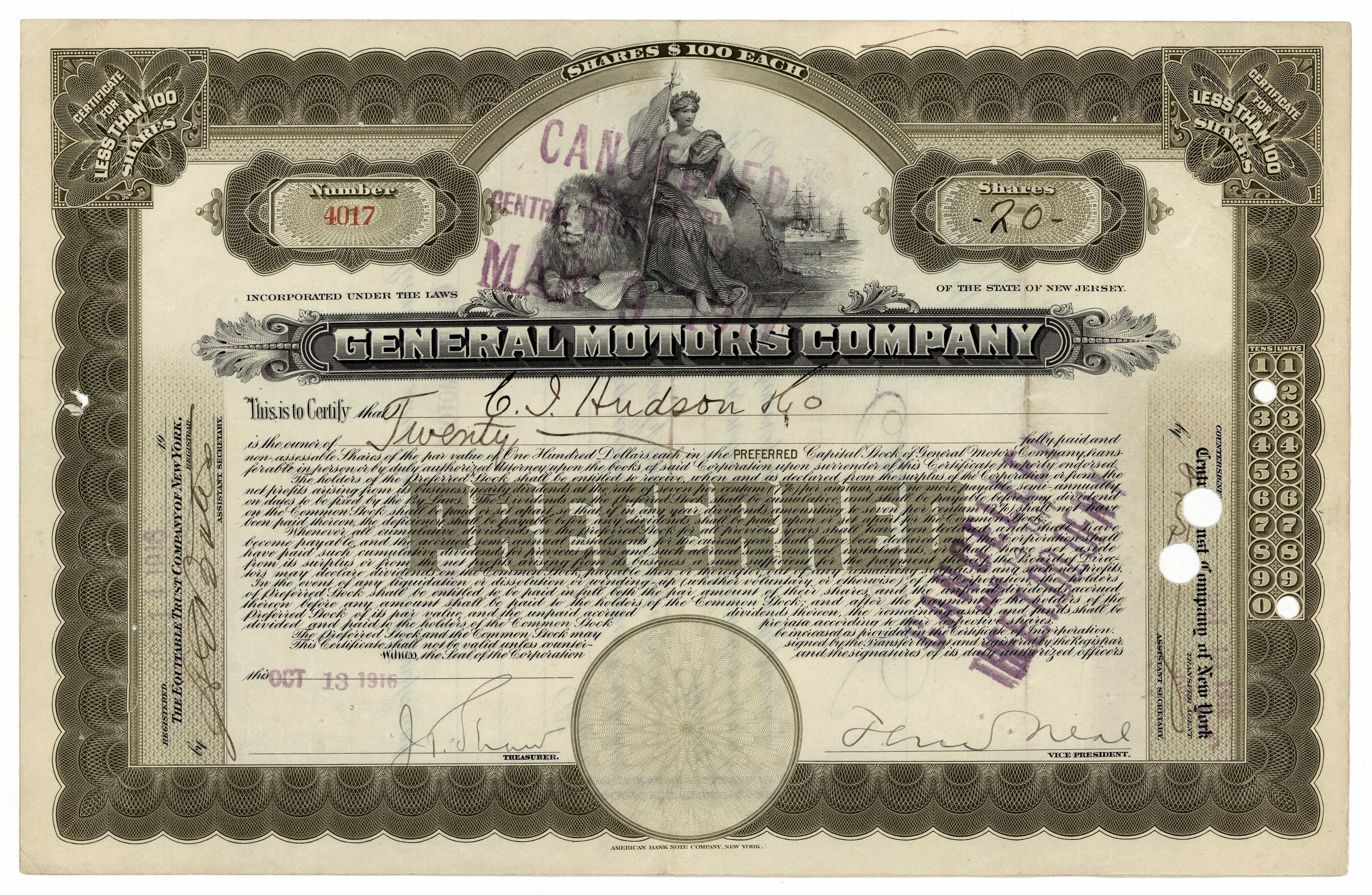
General Motors Company share certificate issued October 13, 1916

GM was reincorporated in Detroit in 1916 as General Motors Corporation and became a public company via an initial public offering. By 1917, Chevrolet had become successful enough that Durant, with the backing of Samuel McLaughlin and Pierre S. du Pont, reacquired a controlling interest in GM. The same year, GM acquired Samson Tractor. Chevrolet Motor Company was consolidated into GM on May 2, 1918, and the same year GM acquired United Motors, a parts supplier founded by Durant and headed by Alfred P. Sloan for $45 million, and the McLaughlin Motor Car Company, founded by R. S. McLaughlin, became General Motors of Canada Limited. In 1919, GM acquired Guardian Frigerator Company, part-owned by Durant, which was renamed Frigidaire. Also in 1919, the General Motors Acceptance Corporation (GMAC), which provides financing to automotive customers, was formed.

In 1920, du Pont orchestrated the removal of Durant once again and replaced him with Sloan. At a time when GM was competing heavily with Ford Motor Company, Sloan established annual model changes, making previous years' models "dated" and created a market for used cars. He also implemented the pricing strategy used by car companies today. The pricing strategy had Chevrolet, Pontiac, Oldsmobile, Buick, and Cadillac priced from least expensive to most, respectively.

In 1921, Thomas Midgley Jr., an engineer for GM, discovered tetraethyllead (leaded gasoline) as an antiknock agent, and GM patented the compound because ethanol could not be patented. This led to the development of higher compression engines resulting in more power and efficiency. The public later realized that lead contained in the gasoline was harmful to various biological organisms including humans. Evidence shows that corporate executives understood the health implications of tetraethyllead from the beginning. As an engineer for GM, Midgley also developed chlorofluorocarbons, which have now been banned due to their contributing to ozone depletion in the upper atmosphere.

Under the encouragement of GM President Alfred P. Sloan Jr., GM acquired Vauxhall Motors for $2.5 million in 1925. The company also acquired an interest in the Yellow Cab Manufacturing Company the same year, and its president, John D. Hertz, joined the board of directors of GM; it acquired the remainder of the company in 1943.

=== Growth and acquisitions ===
In 1926, the company introduced the Pontiac brand and established the General Motors Group Insurance Program to provide life insurance to its employees. The following year, after the success of the 1927 model of the Cadillac LaSalle designed by Harley Earl, Sloan created the "Art and Color Section" of GM and named Earl as its first director. Earl was the first design executive to be appointed to leadership at a major American corporation. Earl created a system of automobile design that is still practiced today. At the age of 24, Bill Mitchell was recruited by Earl to the design team at GM, and he was later appointed as Chief Designer of Cadillac. After Earl retired in December 1958, Mitchell took over automotive design for GM. Also in 1926 the company acquired Fisher Body, its supplier of automobile bodies.

GM acquired Allison Engine Company and began developing a 1,000 horsepower liquid-cooled aircraft engine in 1929. The same year, GM acquired 80% of Opel, which at that time had a 37.5% market share in Europe, for $26 million. It acquired the remaining 20% in 1931.

In the late-1920s, Charles Kettering embarked on a program to develop a lightweight two-stroke diesel engine for possible usage in automobiles. Soon after, GM acquired self-propelled railcar manufacturer Electro-Motive Company and the Winton Engine Co., and in 1941, it expanded EMC's realm to locomotive engine manufacturing and created the Electro-Motive Division (EMD).

In 1932, GM acquired Packard Electric (not to be confused with the Packard car company, which merged with Studebaker years later). The following year, GM acquired a controlling interest in North American Aviation and merged it with the General Aviation Manufacturing Corporation.

The GM labor force participated in the formation of the United Auto Workers labor union in 1935, and in 1936 the UAW organized the Flint Sit-Down Strike, which initially idled two key plants in Flint, Michigan, and later spread to 6 other plants including those in Janesville, Wisconsin and Fort Wayne, Indiana. In Flint, police attempted to enter the plant to arrest strikers, leading to violence; in other cities, the plants were shuttered peacefully. The strike was resolved on February 11, 1937, when GM recognized the UAW as the exclusive bargaining representative for its workers and gave workers a 5% raise and permission to speak in the lunchroom.

Walter E. Jominy and A.L. Boegehold of GM invented the Jominy end-quench test for hardenability of carbon steel in 1937, a breakthrough in heat treating still in use today as ASTM A255. GM established Detroit Diesel the next year.

In 1939, the company founded Motors Insurance Corporation and entered the vehicle insurance market. The same year, GM introduced the Hydramatic, the first affordable and successful automatic transmission, for the 1940 Oldsmobile.

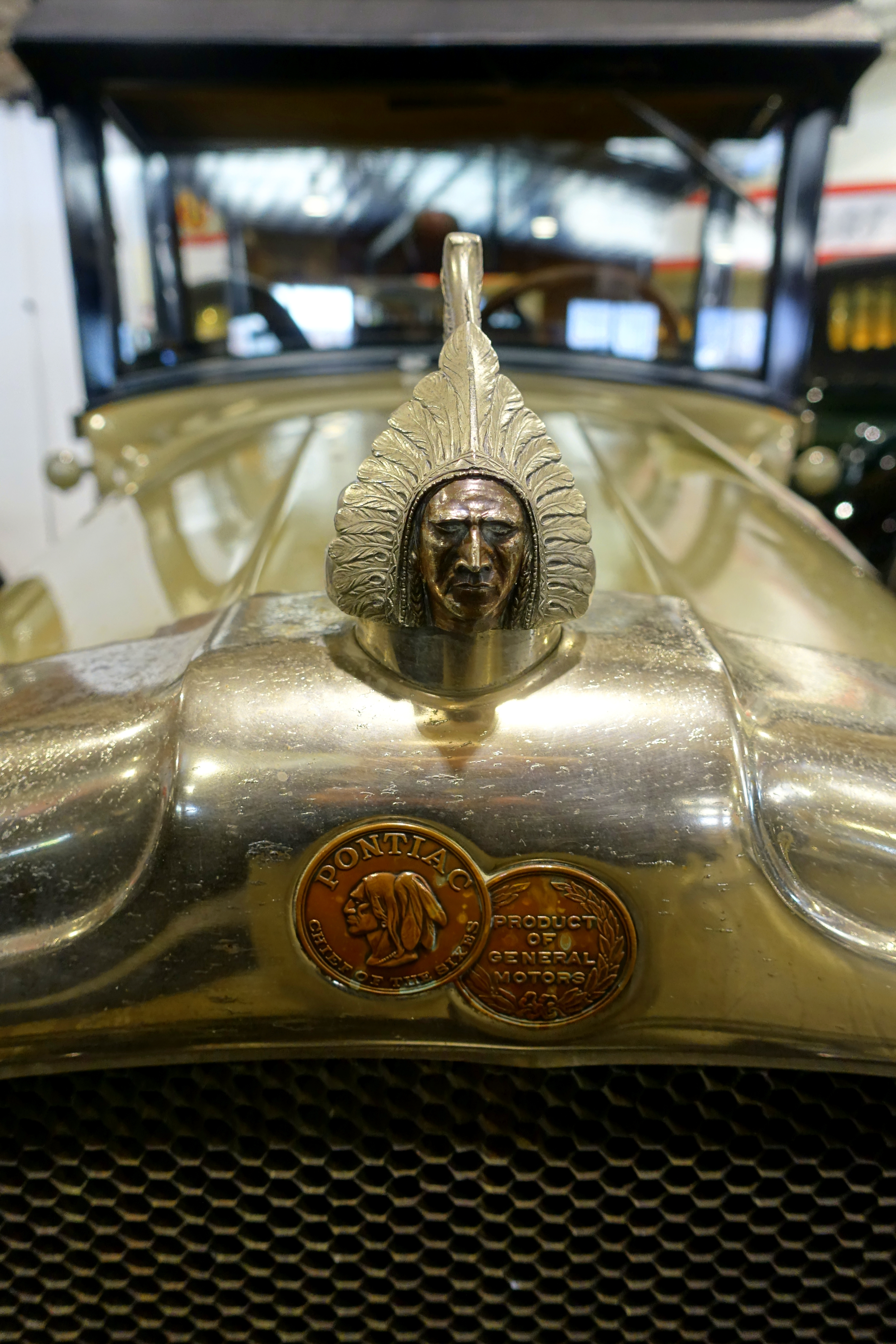
1926 Pontiac radiator logo

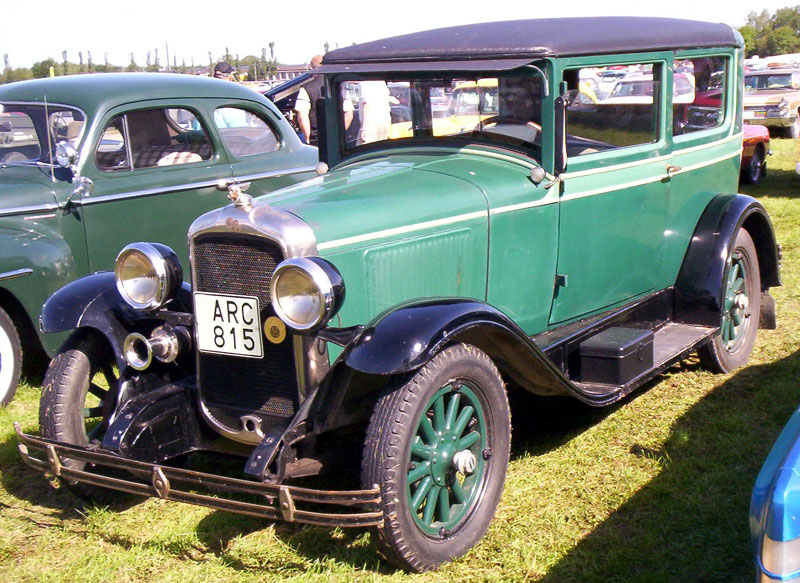
1928 Pontiac Series 6-28 2-door 5-passenger Coach sedan

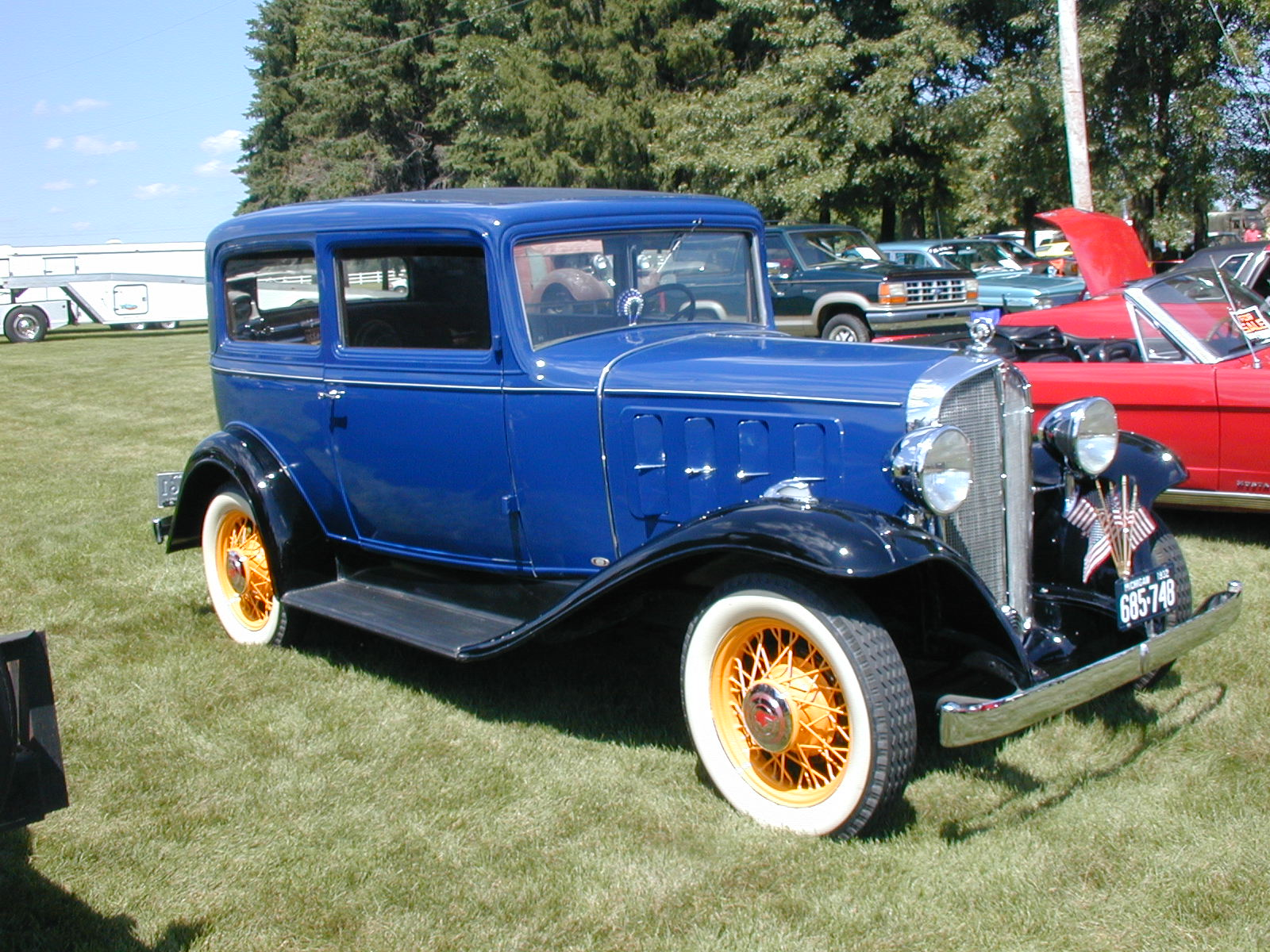
1932 Pontiac Series 402 Six 2-door 5-passenger Coach sedan

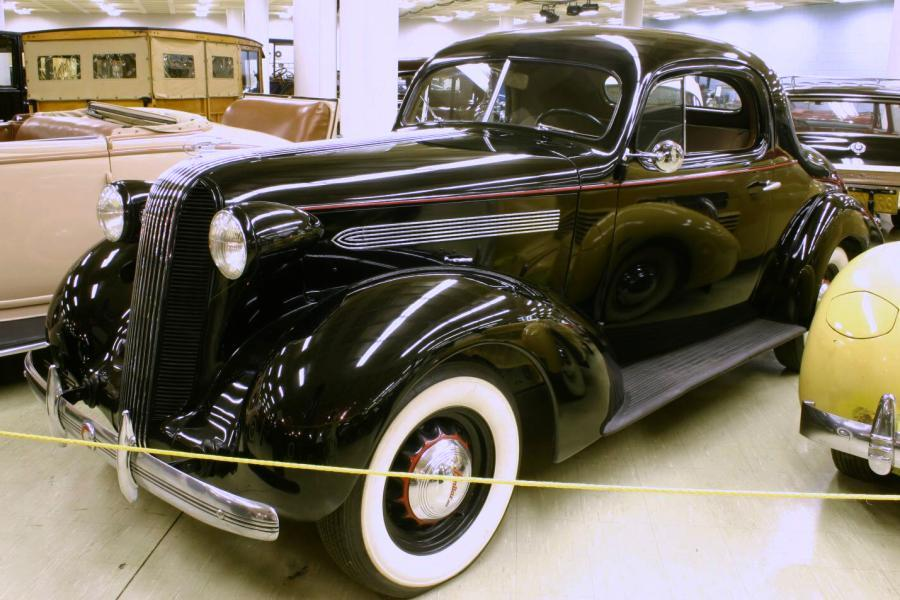
1936 Pontiac Master Six Series 6BB Coupe

During World War II, GM produced vast quantities of armaments, vehicles, and aircraft for the Allies of World War II. In 1940, GM's William S. Knudsen served as head of U.S. wartime production for President Franklin Roosevelt, and by 1942, all of GM's production was to support the war. GM's Vauxhall Motors manufactured the Churchill tank series for the Allies, instrumental in the North African campaign. GM was also a major manufacturer of aircraft, setting up the Eastern Aircraft Division with five plants to assemble Grumman-designed aircraft for the allied navies. However, its Opel division, based in Germany, supplied the Wehrmacht with vehicles such as the Opel Blitz. Politically, Sloan, as head of GM at the time, was an ardent opponent of the New Deal, which bolstered labor unions and public transport. Sloan admired and supported Adolf Hitler. Nazi armaments chief Albert Speer allegedly said in 1977 that Hitler "would never have considered invading Poland" without synthetic fuel technology provided by General Motors. GM was compensated $32 million by the U.S. government because its German factories were bombed by U.S. forces during the war.

Effective January 28, 1953, Charles Erwin Wilson, then GM president, was named by Dwight D. Eisenhower as United States Secretary of Defense.

In December 1953, GM acquired Euclid Trucks, a manufacturer of heavy equipment for earthmoving, including dump trucks, loaders and wheel tractor-scrapers, which later spawned the Terex brand.

=== Periods of innovation ===
Alfred P. Sloan retired as chairman and was succeeded by Albert Bradley in April 1956.

In 1962, GM introduced the first ever turbocharged production car in the world in the Oldsmobile Cutlass Turbo-Jetfire. Two years later, the company introduced its "Mark of Excellence" logo and trademark at the 1964 New York World's Fair. The company used the mark as its main corporate identifier until 2021.

GM released the Electrovan in 1966, the first hydrogen fuel cell car ever produced. Though fuel cells have existed since the early 1800s, General Motors was the first to use a fuel cell, supplied by Union Carbide, to power the wheels of a vehicle with a budget of "millions of dollars".

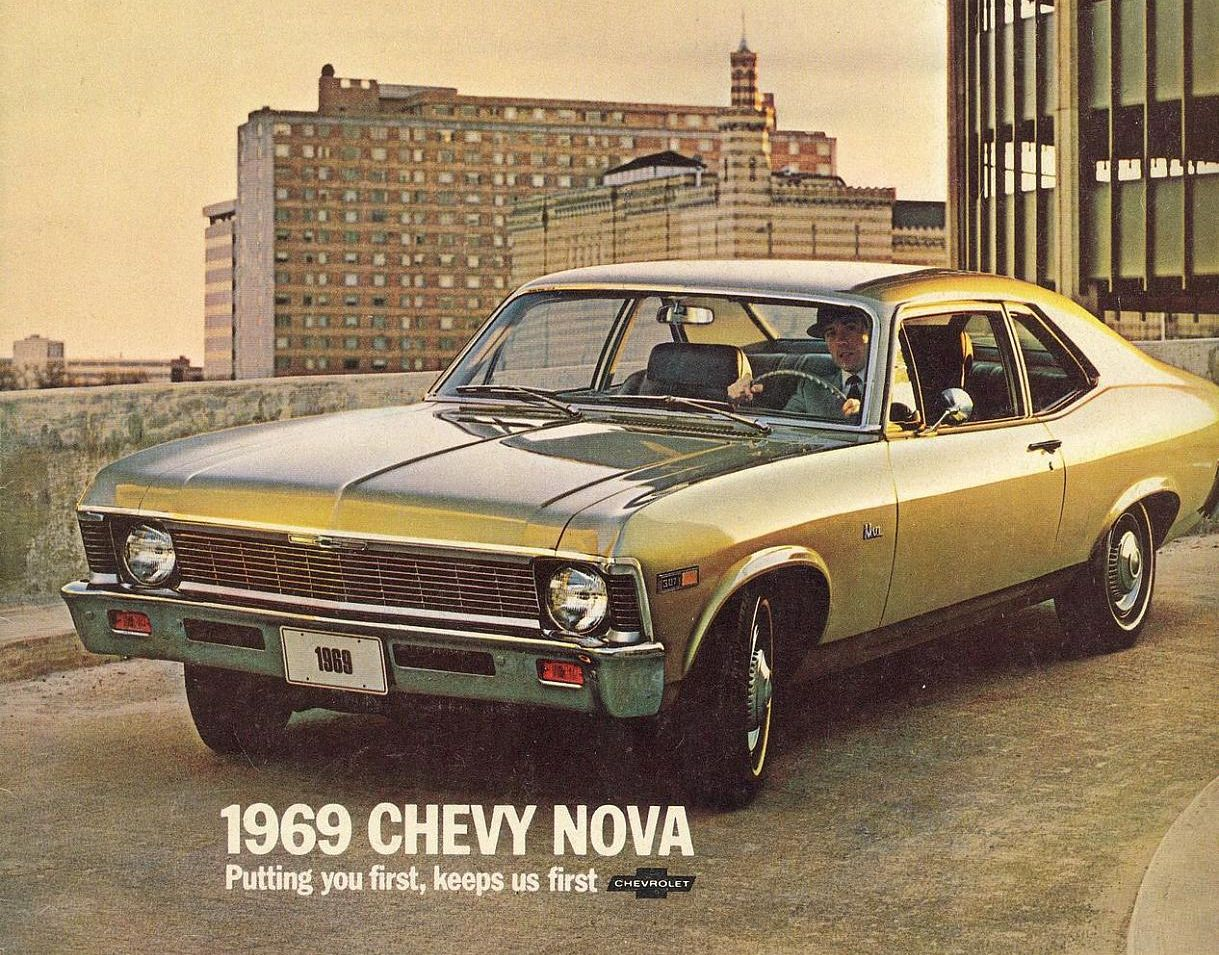
An advertisement for the 1969 Chevrolet Nova using the advertising slogan "Putting you first, keeps us first"

In the 1960s, GM was an early proponent of V6 engines, but quickly lost interest as the popularity of muscle cars increased. GM demonstrated gas turbine vehicles powered by kerosene, an area of interest throughout the industry, but abandoned the alternative engine configuration due to the 1973 oil crisis.

In partnership with Boeing, GM's Delco Defense Electronics Division designed the Lunar Roving Vehicle, which traversed the surface of the Moon, in 1971. The following year, GM produced the first rear wheel anti-lock braking system for two models: the Toronado and Eldorado.

In 1973, the Oldsmobile Toronado was the first retail car sold with a passenger airbag.

Thomas Murphy became CEO of the company, succeeding Richard C. Gerstenberg in November 1974.

GM installed its first catalytic converters in its 1975 models.

From 1978 to 1985, GM pushed the benefits of diesel engines and cylinder deactivation technologies. However, it had disastrous results due to poor durability in the Oldsmobile diesels and drivability issues in the Cadillac V8-6-4 variable-cylinder engines.

GM sold Frigidaire in 1979. Although Frigidaire had between $450 million and $500 million in annual revenues, it was losing money.

General Motors headquarters building, 1981

Robert Lee of GM invented the neodymium magnet, which was fabricated by rapid solidification, in 1984. This magnet is commonly used in products like a computer hard disk. The same year, GM acquired Electronic Data Systems for $2.5 billion from Ross Perot as part of a strategy by CEO Roger Smith to derive at least 10% of its annual worldwide revenue from non-automotive sources. GM also intended to have EDS handle its bookkeeping, help computerize factories, and integrate GM's computer systems. The transaction made Ross Perot the largest shareholder of GM; however, disagreements with Roger Smith led the company to buy all shares held by Ross Perot for $750 million in 1986.

In a continuation of its diversification plans, GMAC formed GMAC Mortgage and acquired Colonial Mortgage as well as the servicing arm of Norwest Mortgage in 1985. This acquisition included an $11 billion mortgage portfolio. The same year, GM acquired the Hughes Aircraft Company for $5 billion in cash and stock and merged it into Delco Electronics. The following year, GM acquired 59.7% of Lotus Cars, a British producer of high-performance sports cars.

In 1987, in conjunction with AeroVironment, GM built the Sunraycer, which won the inaugural World Solar Challenge and was a showcase of advanced technology. Much of the technology from Sunraycer found its way into the Impact prototype electric vehicle (also built by Aerovironment) and was the predecessor to the General Motors EV1.

In 1988, GM acquired a 15% stake in AeroVironment.

In 1989, GM acquired half of Saab Automobile's car operations for $600 million.

=== Sales of assets ===
In August 1990, Robert Stempel became CEO of the company, succeeding Roger Smith. GM cut output significantly and suffered losses that year due to the early 1990s recession.

In 1990, GM debuted the General Motors EV1 (Impact) concept, a battery electric vehicle, at the LA Auto Show. It was the first car with zero emissions marketed in the US in over three decades. The Impact was produced as the EV1 for the 1996 model year and was available only via lease from certain dealers in California and Arizona. In 1999–2002, GM ceased production of the vehicles and started to not renew the leases, disappointing many people, allegedly because the program would not be profitable and would cannibalize its existing business. All of the EV1s were eventually returned to General Motors, and except for around 40 which were donated to museums with their electric powertrains deactivated, all were destroyed. The documentary film Who Killed the Electric Car? covered the EV1 story.

In November 1992, John F. Smith Jr. became CEO of the company.

In 1993, GM sold Lotus Cars to Bugatti.

In 1996, in a return to its automotive basics, GM completed the corporate spin-off of Electronic Data Systems.

In 1997, GM sold the military businesses of Hughes Aircraft Company to Raytheon Company for $9.5 billion in stock and the assumption of debt.

In February 2000, Rick Wagoner was named CEO, succeeding Smith. The next month, GM gave 5.1% of its common stock, worth $2.4 billion, to acquire a 20% share of Fiat.

In December 2000, GM announced that it would begin phasing out Oldsmobile. The brand was eventually discontinued in 2004, seven years after it had become the first American car brand to turn 100.

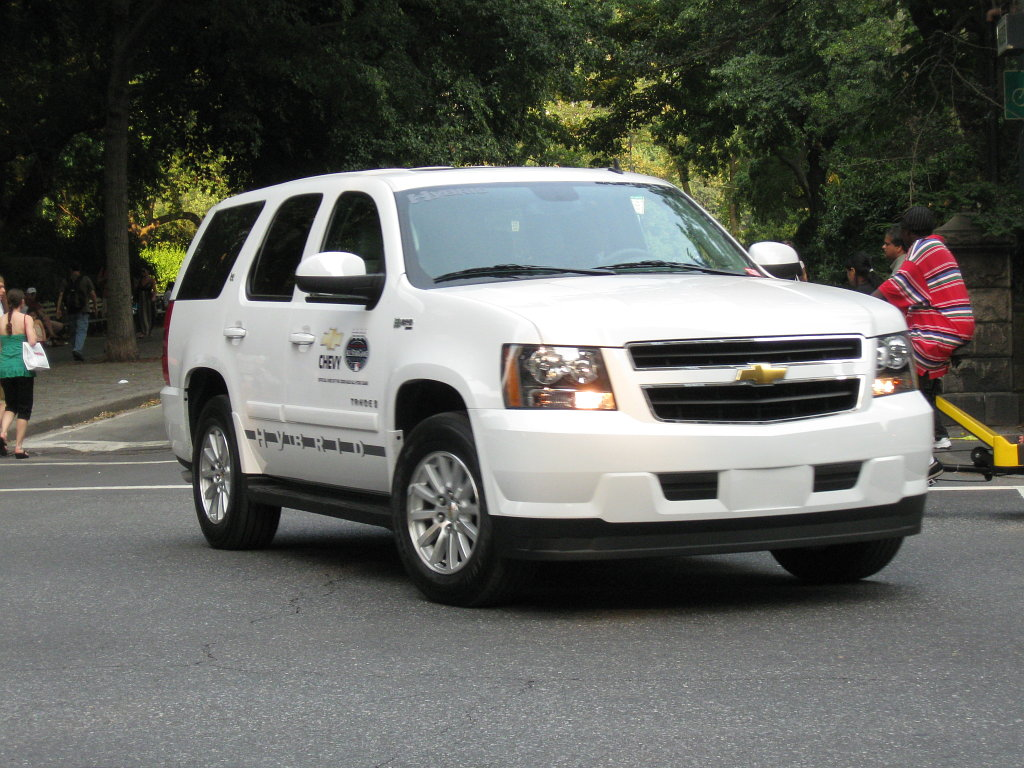
Chevrolet Tahoe hybrid vehicle

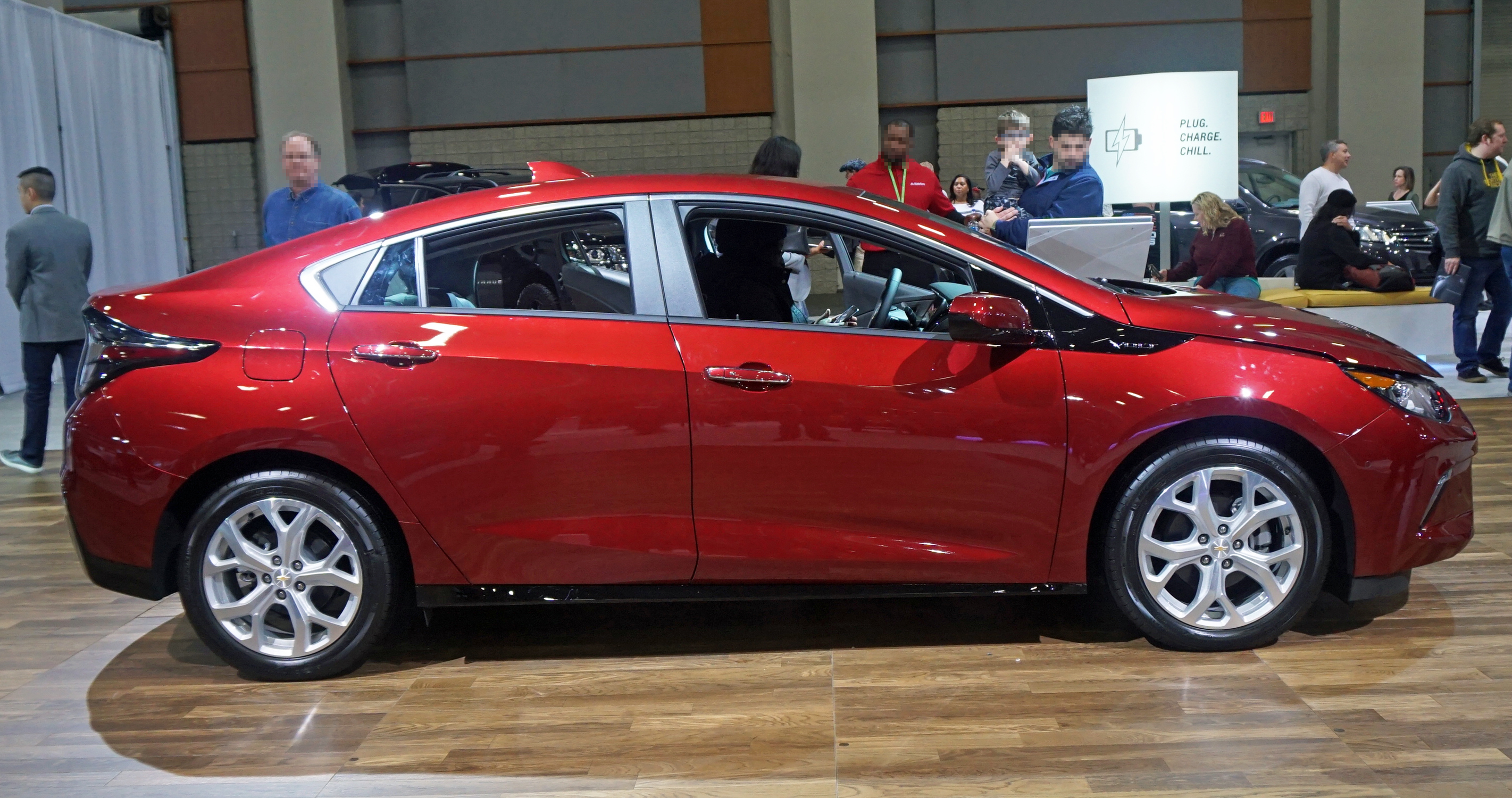
Second generation Chevrolet Volt

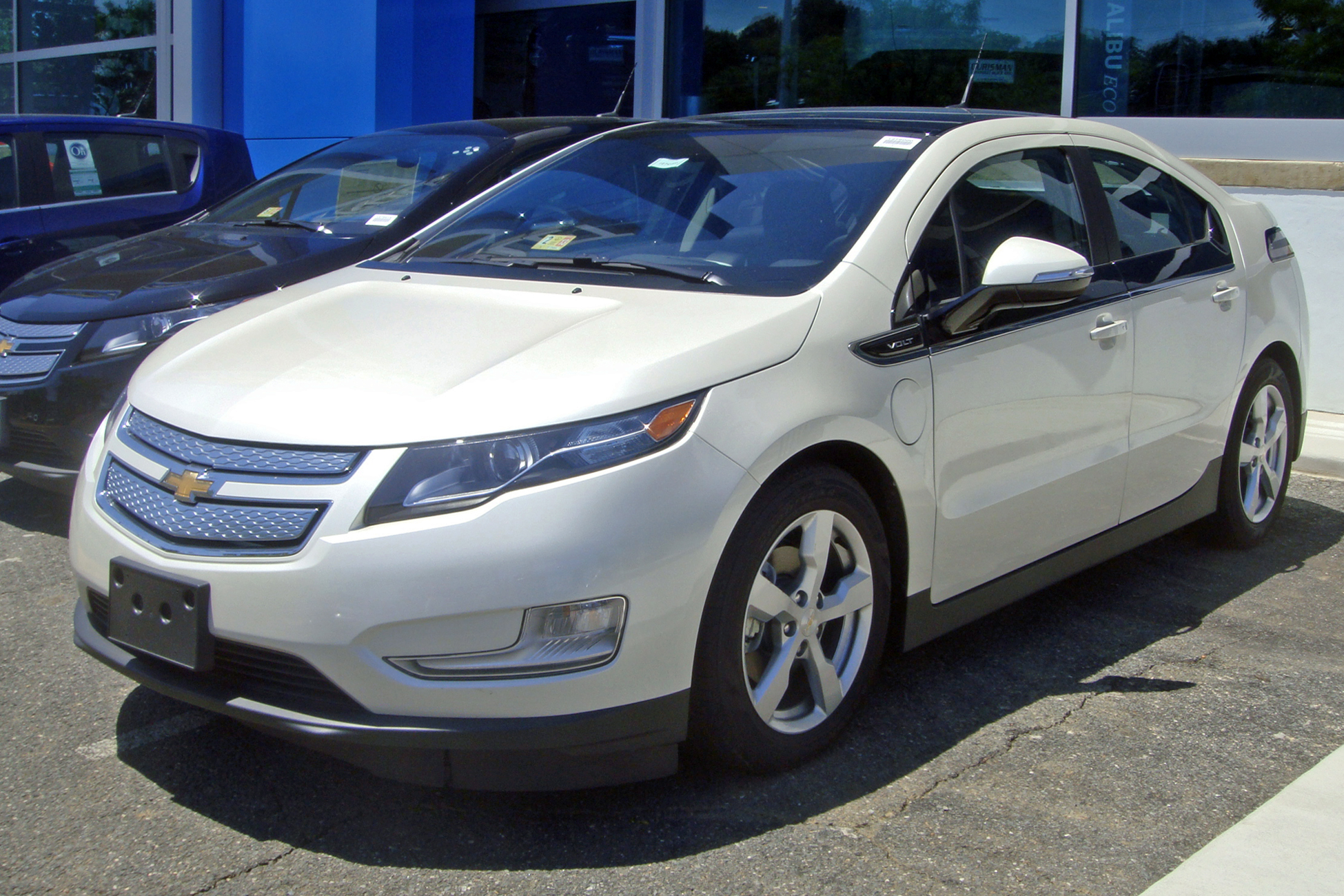
The Chevrolet Volt

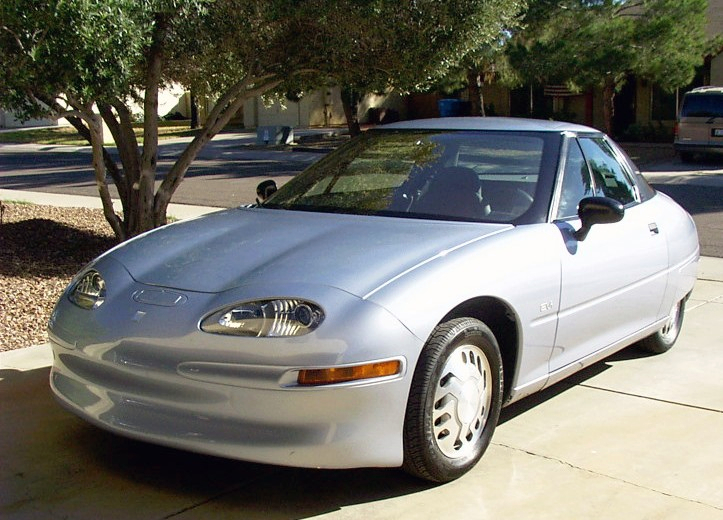
The General Motors EV1, an electric car, was introduced in California in 1996.

In May 2004, GM delivered the first full-sized pickup truck hybrid vehicles, the 1/2-ton Chevrolet Silverado/GMC Sierra trucks. These mild hybrids did not use electrical energy for propulsion, like GM's later designs. Later, the company debuted another hybrid technology, co-developed with DaimlerChrysler and BMW, in diesel-electric hybrid powertrain manufactured by Allison Transmission for transit buses. Continuing to target the diesel-hybrid market, the Opel Astra diesel engine hybrid concept vehicle was rolled out in January 2005. Later that year, GM sold its Electro-Motive Diesel locomotive division to private equity firms Berkshire Partners and Greenbriar Equity Group.

GM paid $2 billion to sever its ties with Fiat in 2005, severing ties with the company due to an increasingly contentious dispute.

GM began adding its "Mark of Excellence" emblem on all new vehicles produced and sold in North America in mid-2005. However, after the reorganization in 2009, the company no longer added the logo, saying that emphasis on its four core divisions would downplay the GM logo.

In 2005, Edward T. Welburn was promoted to the newly created position of vice president, GM Global Design, making him the first African American to lead a global automotive design organization and the highest-ranking African American in the US motor industry at that time. On July 1, 2016, he retired from General Motors after 44 years. He was replaced by Michael Simcoe.

In 2006, GM introduced a bright yellow fuel cap on its vehicles to remind drivers that cars can operate using E85 ethanol fuel. They also introduced another hybrid vehicle that year, the Saturn Vue Green Line.

In 2008, General Motors committed to engineering half of its manufacturing plants to be landfill-free by recycling or reusing waste in the manufacturing process. Continuing its environmental-conscious development, GM started to offer the 2-mode hybrid system in the Chevrolet Tahoe, GMC Yukon, Cadillac Escalade, and pickup trucks.

In late 2008, the world's largest rooftop solar power installation was installed at GM's manufacturing plant in Zaragoza. The Zaragoza solar installation has about 2,000,000 square feet (190,000 m^{2}) of roof at the plant and contains about 85,000 solar panels. The installation was created, owned, and operated by Veolia Environment and Clairvoyant Energy, which leases the rooftop area from GM.

=== Chapter 11 bankruptcy and bailout ===
In March 2009, after the company had received $17.4 billion in bailouts but was not effective in a turnaround, President Barack Obama forced the resignation of CEO Rick Wagoner.

General Motors filed for a government-backed Chapter 11 reorganization on June 8, 2009. On July 10, 2009, the original General Motors sold assets and some subsidiaries to an entirely new company, including the trademark "General Motors". Liabilities were left with the original GM, renamed Motors Liquidation Company, freeing the companies of many liabilities and resulting in a new GM.

Through the Troubled Asset Relief Program, the United States Department of the Treasury invested $49.5 billion in General Motors and recovered $39 billion when it sold its shares on December 9, 2013, resulting in a loss of $10.3 billion. The Treasury invested an additional $17.2 billion into GM's former financing company, GMAC (now Ally Financial). The shares in Ally were sold on December 18, 2014, for $19.6 billion netting the government $2.4 billion in profit, including dividends. A study by the Center for Automotive Research found that the GM bailout saved 1.2 million jobs and preserved $34.9 billion in tax revenue.

General Motors Canada was not part of the General Motors Chapter 11 bankruptcy.

=== Post-reorganization ===
In June 2009, at the request of Steven Rattner, lead adviser to President Barack Obama on the Presidential Task Force on the Auto Industry, Edward Whitacre Jr., who had led a restructuring of AT&T, was appointed as chairman of General Motors. Whitacre was tasked with overseeing GM's emergence from bankruptcy and downsizing its sizable number of brand marques, many of which had produced chronic losses even before the recession began. In July 2009, after 40 days of bankruptcy protection, the company emerged from the government-backed General Motors Chapter 11 reorganization.

As mandated by its bailout agreement, GM began the process of shedding its poorest-performing brands in June 2009: Hummer, Saab, Saturn, and Pontiac. An October 2009 agreement to sell the Hummer brand to China-based Sichuan Tengzhong Heavy Industrial Machinery Company Ltd. and a group of private investors fell through three months later, resulting in GM seeking a new suitor. American company Raser Technologies, along with several others, expressed interest in buying the company, but none of the proposed acquisitions came to fruition, and in April 2010 GM said it was officially shutting down the Hummer brand. Similarly, GM's efforts to sell its Saturn division yielded an early suitor. In June 2009, GM announced that the Saturn brand would be sold to the Penske Automotive Group. The deal fell through, however, and GM declared the brand defunct in October 2010. While GM agreed to shed its underperforming Pontiac brand as part of its bailout agreement, the company explicitly opted not to sell it to another company. The last Pontiac was built in January 2010.

GM was more successful in its attempts to sell Saab Automobile: the company closed a sale to Dutch automaker Spyker Cars in February 2010. Saab continued to perform poorly under Spyker's management, however, and in 2012 the Saab division declared bankruptcy.

In 2009, GM faced significant challenges in its Asian operations, particularly in Korea with GM-Daewoo Automotive Technology Company (GMDAT). At the time, GM would manufacture low-cost small cars in Korea and export them to developing markets, including China. GMDAT suffered from cash flow issues exacerbated by a $1.5 billion loss in foreign exchange in the first quarter of 2009. GM's precarious financial situation, exacerbated by impending bankruptcy, and the reluctance of the US government rescuers to address overseas issues, left few options. Facing a frozen credit market and the Korean Development Bank's refusal to extend loans beyond the existing $2 billion owed by GMDAT, GM had no alternative but to seek capital from China.

By mid-November 2009, GM suddenly had $491 million available for GMDAT's turnaround, though the source of the funds was initially unclear. It was later revealed that GM had sold a 1% stake in Shanghai GM to SAIC Motor, effectively giving SAIC Motor controlling interest in the venture. Additionally, GM transformed its struggling GM India division into a joint venture, with SAIC Motor acquiring a 50% stake in exchange for a $350 million investment. GM executives stated that SAIC Motor's involvement facilitated access to Chinese banking sector funding, which would have been challenging to secure independently. In its 2010 SEC filing, GM clarified that SAIC had helped secure a $400 million commercial bank loan, using its stake in Shanghai-GM as collateral.

In December 2009, the "new" GM's board of directors asked CEO Fritz Henderson to resign, and its chairman, Ed Whitacre, was named interim CEO. GM opted to appoint Whitacre as its permanent CEO the following month, though Whitacre ultimately stepped down as CEO in September 2010, relinquishing the position to fellow GM board member Daniel Akerson but agreeing to continue on as GM chairman until the end of the year. Akerson replaced him as chairman, while continuing as CEO, in January 2011.

In 2010, GM introduced the Chevrolet Volt as an extended-range electric vehicle (EREV), an electric vehicle with backup generators powered by gasoline, a type of plug-in hybrid electric vehicle. GM delivered the first Volt in December 2010. GM built a prototype two-seat electric vehicle with Segway Inc. An early prototype of the Personal Urban Mobility and Accessibility vehicle – dubbed Project P.U.M.A. – was presented in New York at the 2009 New York International Auto Show.

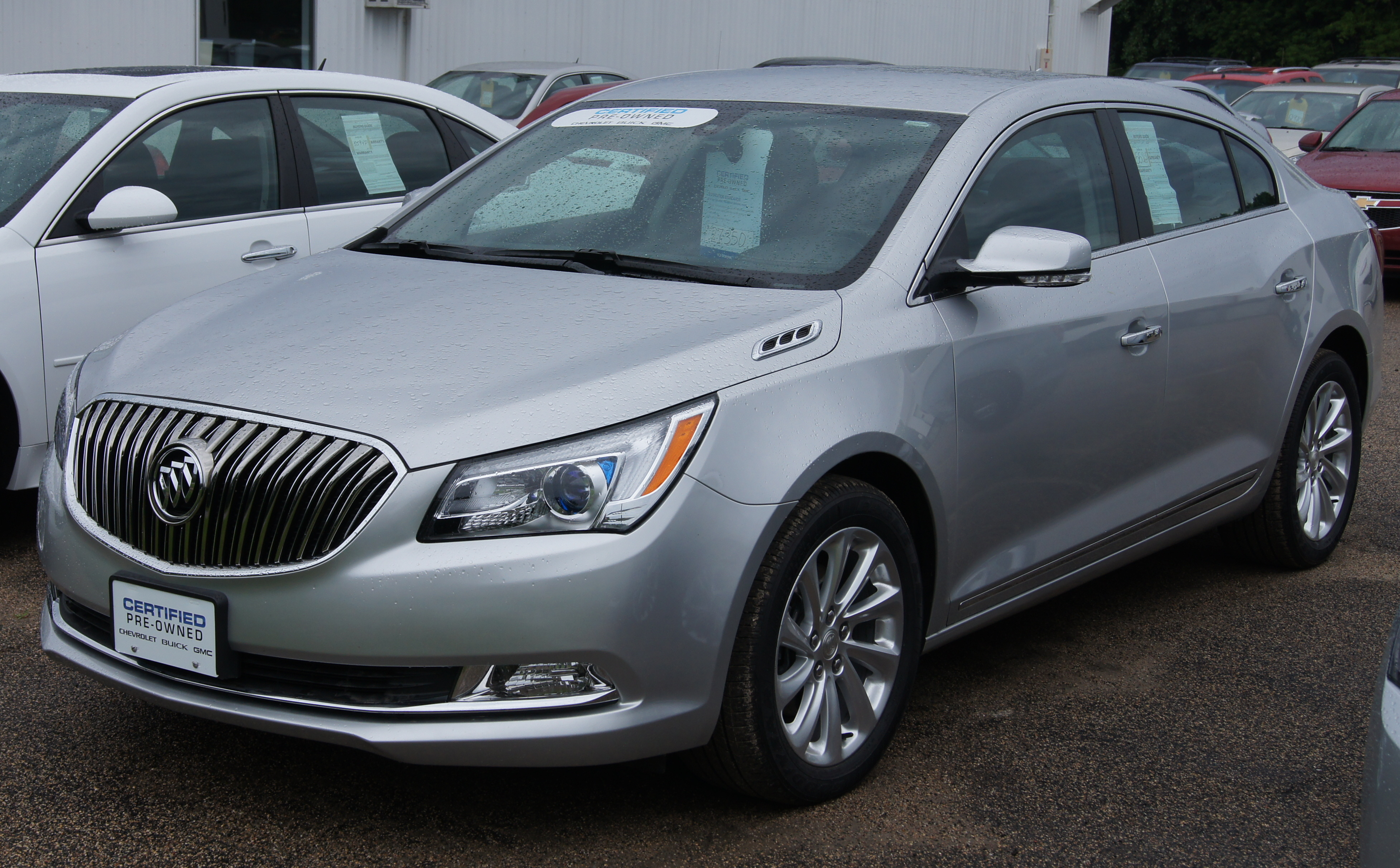
2nd generation Buick LaCrosse (2010–2016)

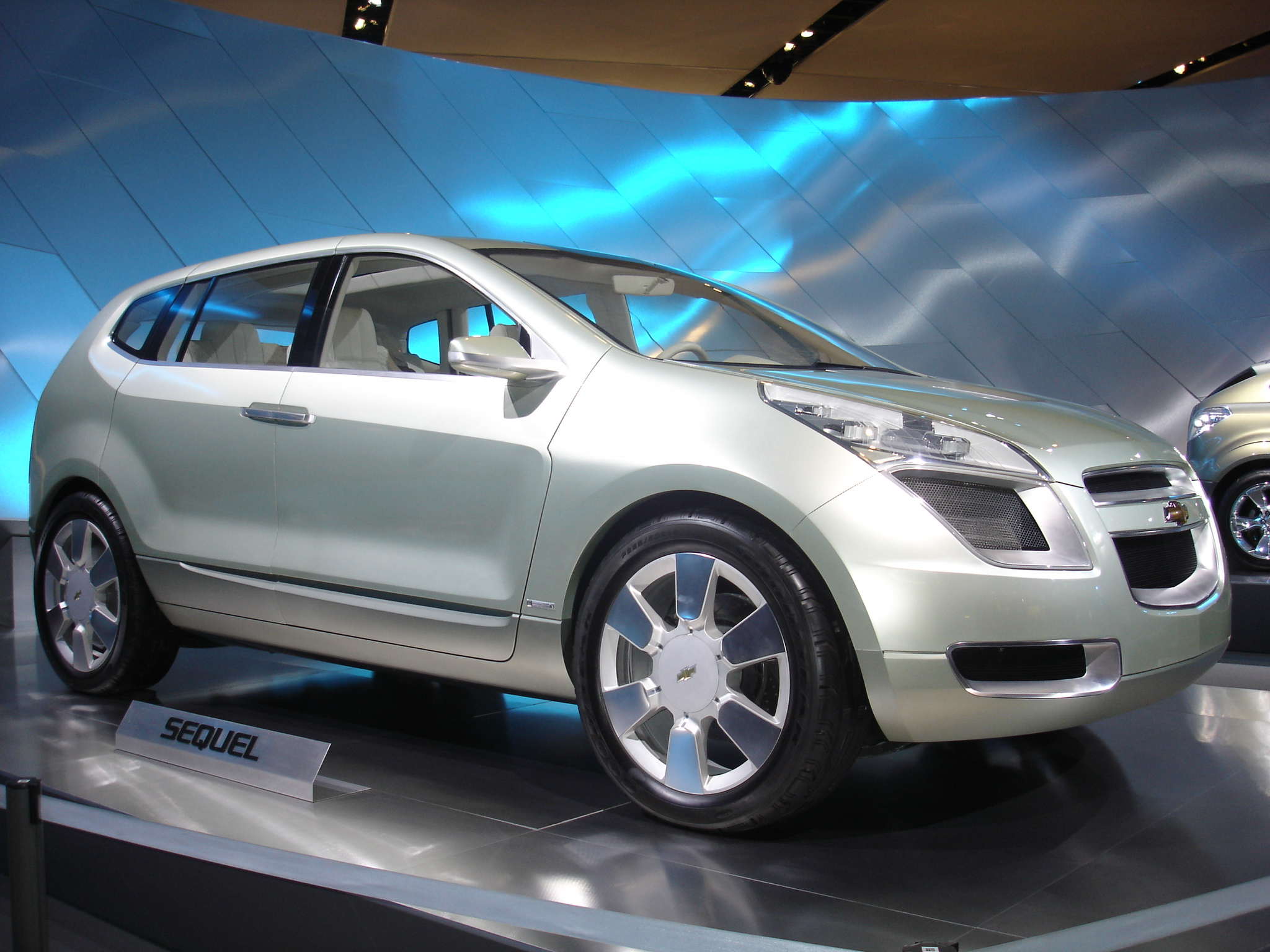
General Motors Sequel, a fuel cell-powered vehicle from GM.

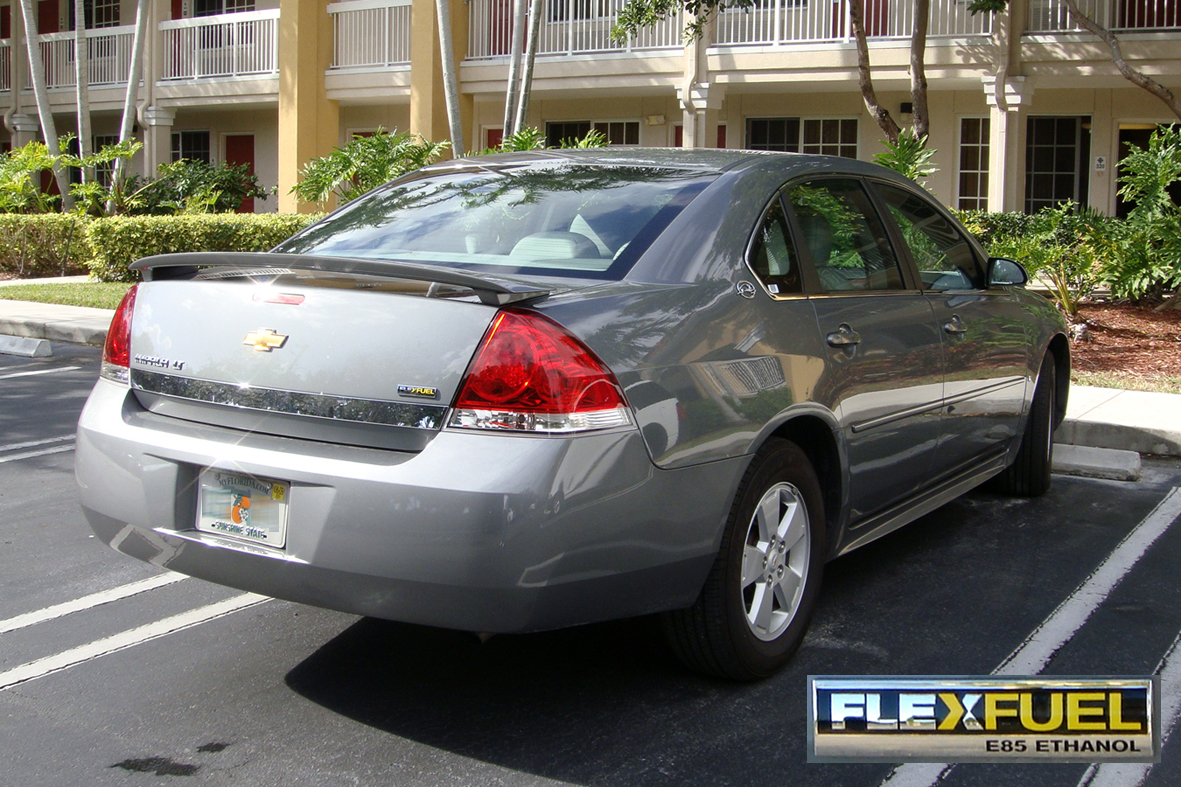
E85 FlexFuel Chevrolet Impala LT 2009 (USA)

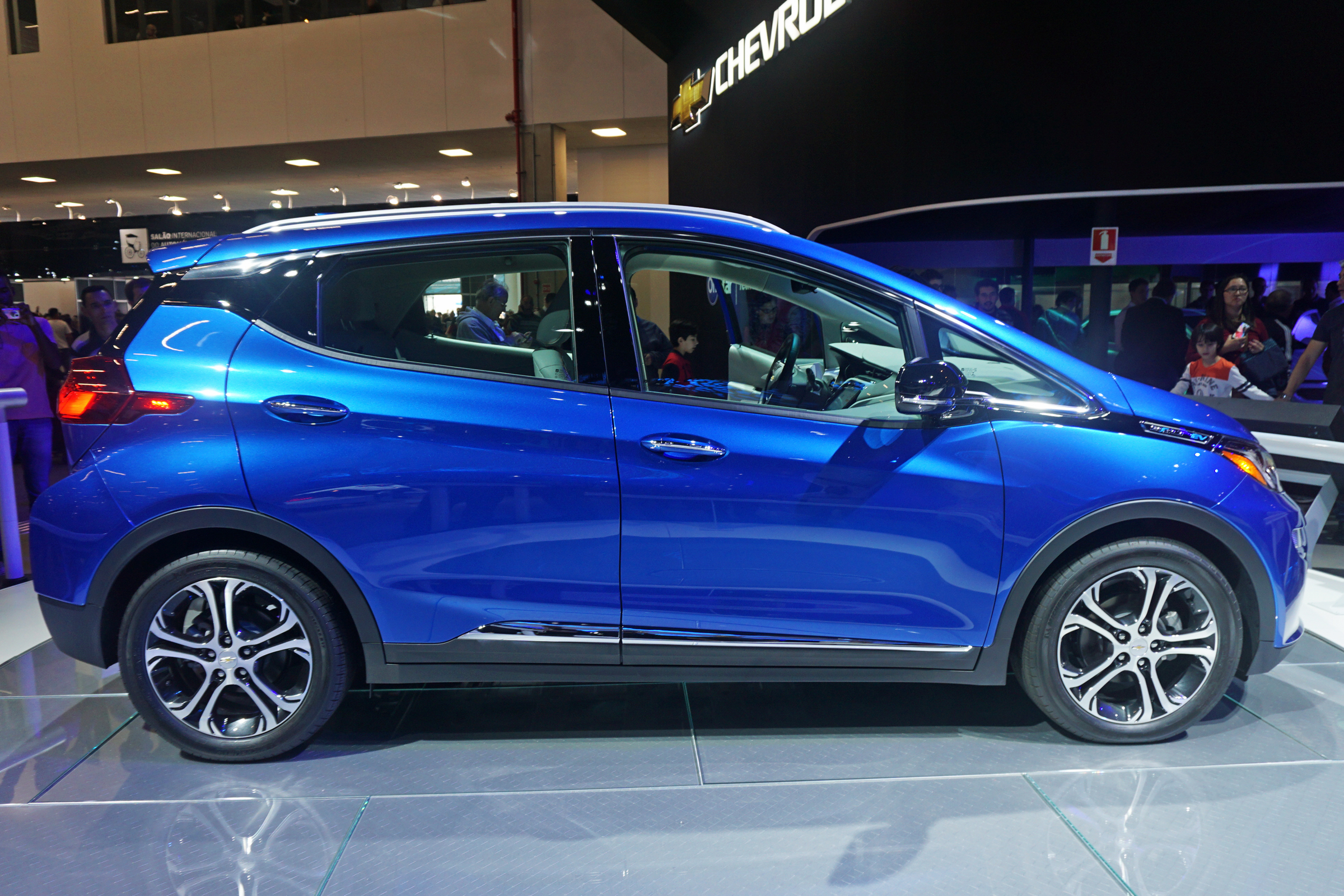
The Chevrolet Bolt EV was released in late 2016.

On January 15, 2014, Mary Barra was named chief executive officer, succeeding Daniel Akerson. Barra also joined the GM board. Only three weeks later, the company announced its 2014 General Motors recall, which was due to faulty ignition switches, and was linked to at least 124 deaths. The resulting settlements with family members of those killed were estimated to cost the company $1.5 billion. Under Barra, GM began a multi-year abandonment of many markets, choosing to focus on higher-profit markets like North America and China.

On January 4, 2016, in its first investment in a ridesharing company, GM invested $500 million in Lyft. The company does not directly supply Lyft drivers with vehicles, however – and has no plans to do so in the future – and Lyft ultimately partnered with Motional for production of its autonomous vehicles.

In March 2016, GM acquired Cruise, a San Francisco self-driving vehicle start-up, to develop self-driving cars that could be used in ride-sharing fleets. In June 2022, Cruise received California's first Driverless Deployment Permit, allowing it to both charge fees for its service as well as offer fully autonomous rides in a major public city. The Verge reported that the company lost $561 million in Q1 2023, but said it remains on the path to reach $1 billion in revenue by 2025 and $50 billion by 2030. After an incident involving an injured pedestrian, GM halted funding of the robotaxi business in December 2024. In February 2025, Cruise was merged into GM to focus on its Super Cruise system for personal vehicles. By March 2025, Super Cruise had achieved SAE Level 2 autonomy.

In October 2016, GM began production of the Chevrolet Bolt EV, the first-ever mass market all-electric car with a range of more than 200 miles (320 km). The battery pack and most drivetrain components were built by LG Corporation and assembled in GM's plant in Lake Orion, Michigan.

In 2017, GM sold General Motors Europe, which produced the German Opel and British Vauxhall brands, to the French PSA Group (owners of the Peugeot and Citroën brands), after having posted 16 years of consecutive losses. The deal was worth US$2.2 billion. Three years later, in 2020, PSA merged with Fiat Chrysler Automobiles and the new entity was named Stellantis.

In December 2017, GM ceased vehicle sales in India and sold its Gujarat plant to SAIC Motor. The Talegaon plant remained operational for export production until December 2020. In January 2024, the Talegaon plant was acquired by Hyundai Motor India.

In December 2019, GM established Ultium Cells, an electric battery joint venture with LG Chem in the US.

On February 17, 2020, GM announced its exit from Thailand, Australia and New Zealand, its major right-hand drive markets, after GM stated it would no longer produce right-hand drive vehicles globally. It pulled out of Indonesia, another right-hand drive market, in 2019. It sold its Thailand manufacturing plant to Chinese automaker Great Wall Motor.

On January 8, 2021, GM introduced a new logo alongside the tagline "EVerybody in", with the capitalized "EV" as a nod to the company's commitment to electric vehicles. GM's new logo used negative space to create the idea of an electric plug in the "M" of the logo.

At the January 2021 Consumer Electronics Show, GM launched BrightDrop, a brand for all-electric commercial vehicles.

On January 28, 2021, GM announced that it will end production and sales of fossil-fuel vehicles (including hybrids and plug-in hybrids) by 2035 as part a broader plan to reach carbon neutrality by 2040. These plans were scaled back in 2025, due to lack of customer demand.

In 2021, GM announced plans to establish an automotive battery and battery pack laboratory in Michigan. GM will be responsible for battery management systems and power electronics, thermal management, as well as the pack assembly. An existing GM facility at Brownstown Township was chosen to be upgraded as a battery pack plant. LG Chem's U.S. subsidiary, Compact Power of Troy, Michigan, has been building the prototype packs for the development vehicles and will continue to provide integration support and acting as a liaison for the program.

In mid-2023, GM abandoned its goal of North American electric vehicle deliveries of 400,000 units from 2022 by mid-2024. It had previously set the timeline of by end of 2023. CEO Mary Barra pointed to failures in the scaling of battery module production while simultaneously blaming lack of consumer demand.

General Motors and LG Chem Ltd. have a long-term supply agreement. LG Chem Ltd. will provide GM with more than 500,000 tons of cathode materials for 24.7 trillion won (US$18.6 billion). Provided materials to the automaker will be enough for 5 million electric vehicles.

In January 2024, GM announced it would once again manufacture a plug-in hybrid electric vehicle (PHEV) while it aims to balance supply of battery electric vehicles with demand.

On April 15, 2024, GM announced that it would relocate its global headquarters from the Renaissance Center to the nearby Hudson's Detroit development in 2025. As of January 12, 2026 it has begun official occupancy of the site.

In October 2024, General Motors increased its investment in lithium production by raising its commitment to Canadian mining company Lithium Americas from $650 million to $945 million. The investment establishes a joint venture with Lithium Americas to develop the Thacker Pass lithium mine in Nevada, one of the largest known lithium resources in the United States, positioning GM to meet growing demand for EVs by reducing dependency on foreign lithium sources.

In March 2026, General Motors announced that it planned to invest $600 million to upgrade manufacturing facilities and products in South Korea.

=== Motorsport ===
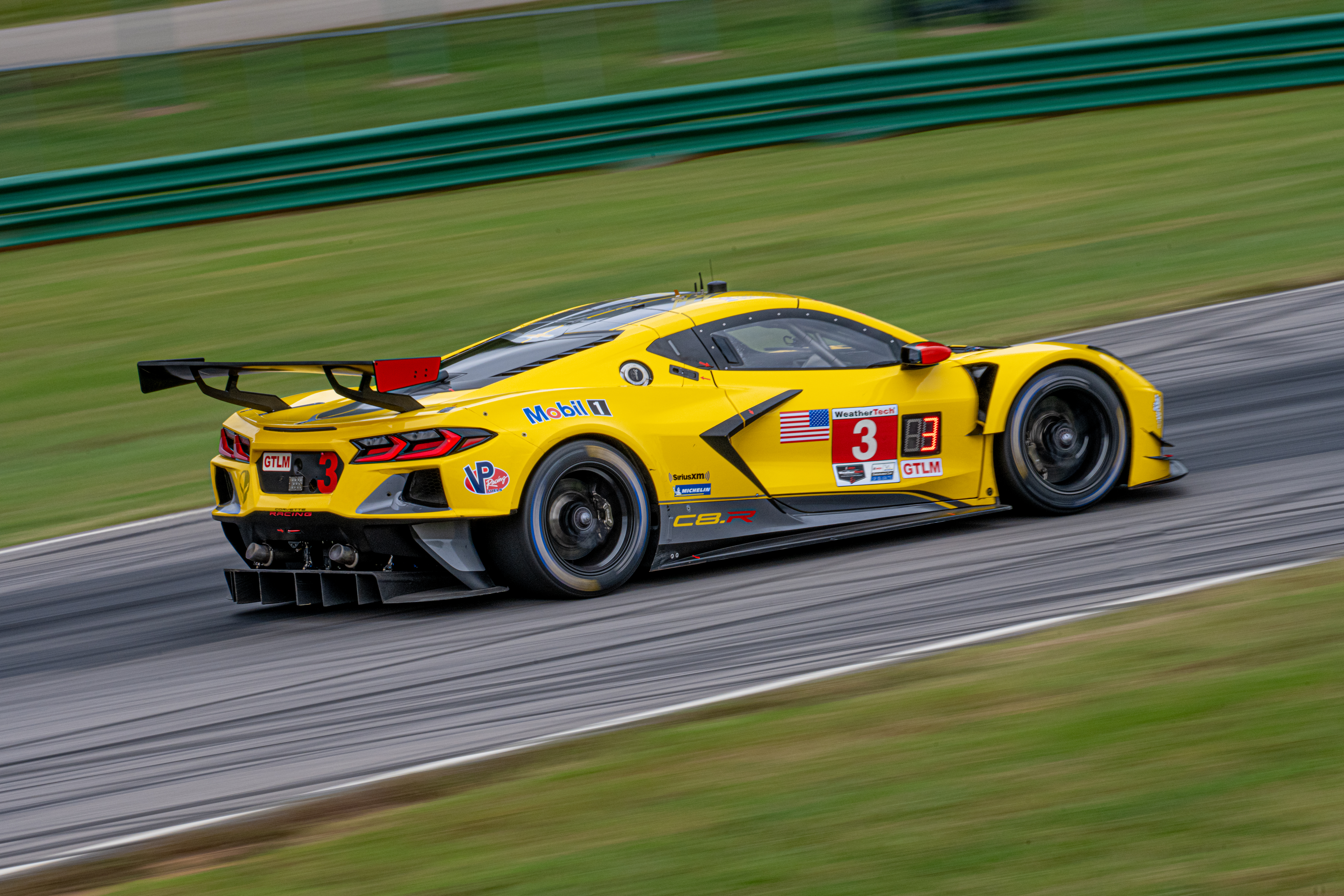
Chevrolet Corvette C8.R in the IMSA SportsCar Championship

GM participated in the World Touring Car Championship (WTCC) from 2004 to 2012, and has also participated in other motorsport championships, including 24 Hours of Le Mans, NASCAR, SCCA and Supercars Championship.

GM's engines were successful in the Indy Racing League (IRL) throughout the 1990s, winning many races in the small V8 class. GM has also done much work in the development of electronics for GM auto racing. An unmodified Aurora V8 in the Aerotech captured 47 world records, including the record for speed endurance in the Motorsports Hall of Fame of America. Recently, the Cadillac V-Series has entered motorsports racing.

GM has also designed cars specifically for use in NASCAR auto racing. The Chevrolet Camaro ZL1 is the only entry in the series. In the past, the Pontiac Grand Prix, Buick Regal, Oldsmobile Cutlass, Chevrolet Lumina, Chevrolet Malibu, Chevrolet Monte Carlo, Chevrolet Impala, and the Chevrolet SS were also used. GM has won many NASCAR Cup Series manufacturer's championships, including 40 with Chevrolet, the most of any make in NASCAR history, 3 with Oldsmobile, 2 with Buick, and 1 with Pontiac. In 2021, Chevrolet became the first brand to reach 800 wins.

In Australia, Holden cars based on the Monaro, Torana and Commodore platforms raced in the Australian Touring Car Championship until 2022. Holden won the Bathurst 1000, a record 36 times between 1968 and 2022 and the Australian Touring Car Championship 23 times. From 2023, the Chevrolet Camaro will be raced.

In November 2024, GM and TWG Global reached an agreement in principle to enter the 2026 Formula One World Championship under the Cadillac name with the Ferrari engine, and would enter as an engine supplier at a later date.

=== Logo evolution ===
Evolution of the GM logo through the years:

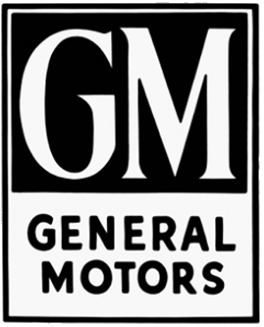
1938–1964

Mark of Excellence (1964–2021)

2001–2010

2010–2021

2021 (gradient)

2022 (wordmark)

== Brands ==
=== Current ===
| Origin | Brand | Founded | Started manufacturing | Joined GM | Markets served today |
|---|---|---|---|---|---|
| US | Chevrolet | 1911 | 1911 | 1918 | Americas, Europe, China, Middle East, South Korea, Philippines, Japan, Australasia, Africa |
| US | Buick | 1899 | 1903 | 1908 | China, North America |
| US | GMC | 1912 | 1912 | 1919 | North America, Middle East, South Korea, Australasia |
| US | Cadillac | 1902 | 1902 | 1909 | North America, Middle East, China, Japan, South Korea, Europe, Kazakhstan, Australasia |
| CHN | Baojun (Note: Brand is owned by SAIC-GM-Wuling joint venture) | 2010 | 2010 | 2010 | China |
| CHN | Wuling | 2002 | 2002 | 2002 | China, Indonesia, Vietnam, Thailand |

=== Former ===
| Origin | Brand | Founded | Start manufacturing | Joined GM | Fate | Defunct or sold | Notes |
|---|---|---|---|---|---|---|---|
| CAN | Acadian | 1962 | 1962 | 1962 | Discontinued | 1987 | Until 1971 a Chevy II with Pontiac design accents, after 1976 a Chevette with Pontiac name and appearance. |
| KOR | Alpheon | 2010 | 2010 | 2010 | Discontinued | 2015 | The only available model was based on the Buick LaCrosse |
| CAN | Asüna | 1992 | 1992 | 1992 | Discontinued | 1994 | Composed of Suzuki, Isuzu and Toyota models. |
| CAN | Beaumont | 1966 | 1966 | 1966 | Discontinued | 1969 | Canadian Chevelle with Pontiac design accents |
| UK | Bedford | 1931 | 1931 | 1931 | Discontinued | 1991 | |
| US | BrightDrop | 2021 | 2022 | 2021 | Merged into Chevrolet | 2025 | |
| US | Cartercar | 1905 | 1905 | 1909 | Discontinued | 1915 | |
| KOR | Daewoo | 1978 | 1955 | 2002 | Discontinued | 2011 | Succeeded by GM Daewoo Auto & Technology Company(recent GM Korea) |
| US | Electro Motive Diesel | 1922 | 1924 | 1930 | Sold to Progress Rail | 2010 | EMD still makes locomotives such as the SD70ACe |
| US | Elmore | 1893 | 1900 | 1912 | Discontinued | 1916 | |
| CAN | Envoy | 1959 | 1959 | 1959 | Discontinued | 1970 | Imported Vauxhall and Bedford vehicles sold at Canadian Chevrolet and Oldsmobile dealerships |
| CAN | Epic | 1964 | 1964 | 1964 | Discontinued | 1970 | Imported Vauxhall models sold at Canadian Pontiac, Buick and GMC dealerships |
| US | Geo | 1989 | 1989 | 1989 | Discontinued | 1997 | Composed of Suzuki, Isuzu and Toyota models. Sold through Chevrolet dealerships. |
| KOR | GMK | 1972 | 1972 | 1972 | Sold to Saehan Motors | 1976 | Joint venture of Shinjin Motors and GM in South Korea |
| AUS | Holden | 1856 | 1908 | 1926 | Discontinued | 2020 | |
| US | Hummer | 1992 | 1992 | 1998 | Discontinued as a division, brand name revived under GMC | 2010 | Parent company AM General, formerly owned by AMC. Became independent after AMC and Renault merged in 1978. Name revived in 2021 for GMC Hummer EV |
| US | LaSalle | 1927 | 1927 | 1927 | Discontinued | 1940 | Companion brand for Cadillac |
| US | Little | 1911 | 1911 | 1913 | Discontinued | 1913 | Absorbed by Chevrolet in 1913. |
| UK | Lotus | 1948 | 1948 | 1986 | Sold to Romano Artioli | 1993 | Currently owned by Geely |
| US | Marquette (1) | 1909 | 1909 | 1909 | Discontinued | 1912 | formerly Peninsular Motor Company. Based on Rainier and Welch marques. |
| US | Marquette (2) | 1929 | 1929 | 1929 | Discontinued | 1931 | Companion brand for Buick in 1928. |
| US | Mason | 1898 | 1900 | 1918 | Discontinued | 1918 | Absorbed as sister division of Chevrolet in 1915. |
| CAN | McLaughlin | 1907 | 1907 | 1918 | Discontinued | 1942 | Canadian Buick-related, became the basis of General Motors Canada |
| US | Oakland | 1907 | 1907 | 1909 | Discontinued | 1931 | Dropped in favor of Pontiac |
| US | Oldsmobile | 1897 | 1897 | 1908 | Discontinued | 2004 | |
| GER | Opel | 1899 | 1899 | 1931 | Sold to PSA Group | 2017 | Currently owned by Stellantis |
| CAN | Passport | 1987 | 1987 | 1987 | Discontinued | 1991 | Composed of Daewoo, Suzuki, Isuzu and Toyota models |
| US | Pontiac | 1926 | 1926 | 1926 | Discontinued | 2010 | Started as companion brand for Oakland |
| US | Rainier | 1905 | 1905 | 1909 | Discontinued | 1911 | Restructured after its 1909 acquisition, as Marquette Motor Company. Produced 'Rainier' cars until 1911 |
| US | Reliance | 1903 | 1903 | 1911 | Discontinued | 1912 | Consolidated into what would become GMC |
| RSA | Ranger | 1968 | 1968 | 1968 | Discontinued | 1978 | |
| US | Rapid | 1902 | 1902 | 1909 | Discontinued | 1912 | Consolidated into what would become GMC |
| SWE | Saab | 1945 | 1949 | 1990 | Sold to Spyker N.V. | 2010 | Company defunct in 2016 |
| KOR | Saehan | 1976 | 1976 | 1976 | Sold to Daewoo | 1978 | Joint venture of KDB and GM in South Korea |
| US | Saturn | 1985 | 1990 | 1985 | Discontinued | 2010 | |
| US | Scripps-Booth | 1913 | 1913 | 1916 | Discontinued | 1923 | |
| US | Sheridan | 1920 | 1920 | 1920 | Discontinued | 1921 | Was technically the first car developed by General Motors |
| AUS | Statesman | 1971 | 1971 | 1971 | Discontinued | 1984 | Division of Holden |
| UK | Vauxhall | 1903 | 1903 | 1925 | Sold to PSA Group | 2017 | Currently owned by Stellantis |
| US | Viking | 1929 | 1929 | 1929 | Discontinued | 1930 | Started as companion brand for Oldsmobile |
| US | Welch | 1901 | 1901 | 1910 | Discontinued | 1911 | Brand shuttered shortly after purchase. |
| US | Winton | 1897 | 1897 | 1930 | Discontinued | 1962 | Reorganized as Winton Engine Corporation. Merged into GM's Cleveland Diesel Engine Division in 1938. Folded into Electro-Motive Diesel in 1962. |
| US | Yellow Cab | 1920 | 1920 | 1925 | Discontinued | 1943 | Absorbed into GMC |
| US | Yellow Coach | 1923 | 1923 | 1925 | Discontinued | 1943 | Absorbed into GMC |

== Corporate affairs ==
=== Business trends ===
The key trends for GM are (as of the financial year ending December 31):

| | Revenue (US$ bn) | Net profit (US$ bn) | Total assets (US$ bn) | Employees (k) | Car sales worldwide (m) |
|---|---|---|---|---|---|
| 2016 | 149 | 9.2 | 221 | 225 | 10.0 |
| 2017 | 145 | −3.8 | 212 | 180 | 9.6 |
| 2018 | 147 | 8.0 | 227 | 173 | 8.3 |
| 2019 | 137 | 6.7 | 228 | 164 | 7.7 |
| 2020 | 122 | 6.4 | 235 | 155 | 6.8 |
| 2021 | 127 | 10.0 | 244 | 157 | 6.2 |
| 2022 | 156 | 9.9 | 264 | 167 | 5.9 |
| 2023 | 172 | 10.1 | 273 | 163 | 6.1 |
| 2024 | 187 | 6.0 | 280 | 162 | 6.0 |
| 2025 | 185 | 2.7 | 281 | 156 | 6.1 |

=== Vehicle sales ===
General Motors was the largest global automaker by annual vehicle sales for 77 consecutive years, from 1931, when it overtook Ford Motor Company, until 2008 when it was overtaken by Toyota. This reign was longer than any other automaker, and GM is still among the world's largest automakers by vehicle unit sales.

In 2008, the third-largest individual country by sales was Brazil, with some 550,000 GM vehicles sold. In that year, Argentina, Colombia, and Venezuela sold another 300,000 GM vehicles, suggesting that the total GM sales in South America (including sales in other South American countries such as Chile, Peru, Ecuador, Bolivia, etc.) in that year were at a similar level to sales in China.

In 2009, General Motors sold 6.5 million cars and trucks globally; in 2010, it sold 8.39 million. Sales in China rose 66.9% in 2009 to 1,830,000 vehicles and accounting for 13.4% of the market.

In 2010, General Motors ranked second worldwide with 8.5 million vehicles produced. In 2011, GM returned to the first place with 9.025 million units sold worldwide, corresponding to 11.9% market share of the global motor vehicle industry. In 2010, vehicle sales in China by GM rose 28.8% to a record 2,351,610 units. The top two markets in 2011 were China, with 2,547,203 units, and the United States, with 2,503,820 vehicles sold. The Chevrolet brand was the main contributor to GM performance, with 4.76 million vehicles sold around the world in 2011, a global sales record.

Based on global sales in 2012, General Motors was ranked among the world's largest automakers.

In May 2012, GM recorded an 18.4% market share in the U.S. with stock imported.

Annual worldwide sales volume reached 10 million vehicles in 2016. Sales in India for April 2016 – March 2017 declined to 25,823 units from 32,540 the previous year and market share contracted from 1.17% to 0.85% for the same period. However, exports surged 89% during the same period to 70,969 units. GMTC-I, GM's technical center in Bangalore, India continued in operation. Weak product line-up and below par service quality were the reasons for the poor showing by GM in India that year.

Global Volt/Ampera family sales totalled about 177,000 units from its inception in December 2010 through 2018. including over 10,000 Opel/Vauxhall Amperas sold in Europe up to December 2015. The Volt family of vehicles ranked as the world's all-time top-selling plug-in hybrid as of September 2018, and it is also the third best selling plug-in electric car in history after the Nissan Leaf (375,000) and the Tesla Model S (253,000), as of October 2018. The Chevrolet Volt is also the U.S. all-time top-selling plug-in electric car with 148,556 units delivered through October 2018.

GM worldwide 2008 vehicle sales (thousands)
| Rank in GM | Location | Vehicle sales | Market share (%) |
|---|---|---|---|
| 1 | United States | 2,981 | 22.1% |
| 2 | China | 1,095 | 12.0% |
| 3 | Brazil | 549 | 19.5% |
| 4 | United Kingdom | 384 | 15.4% |
| 5 | Canada | 359 | 21.4% |
| 6 | Russia | 338 | 11.1% |
| 7 | Germany | 300 | 8.8% |
| 8 | Mexico | 212 | 19.8% |
| 9 | Australia | 133 | 13.1% |
| 10 | South Korea | 117 | 9.7% |
| 11 | France | 114 | 4.4% |
| 12 | Spain | 107 | 7.8% |
| 13 | Argentina | 95 | 15.5% |
| 14 | Venezuela | 91 | 33.3% |
| 15 | Colombia | 80 | 36.3% |
| 16 | India | 66 | 3.3% |

| Year | U.S. sales (vehicles) | Chg/yr. |
|---|---|---|
| 1998 | 4,603,991 | |
| 1999 | 5,017,150 | ▲9.0% |
| 2000 | 4,953,163 | ▼1.3% |
| 2001 | 4,904,015 | ▼1.0% |
| 2002 | 4,858,705 | ▼0.9% |
| 2003 | 4,756,403 | ▼2.1% |
| 2004 | 4,707,416 | ▼1.0% |
| 2005 | 4,517,730 | ▼4.0% |
| 2006 | 4,124,645 | ▼8.7% |
| 2007 | 3,866,620 | ▼6.3% |
| 2008 | 2,980,688 | ▼22.9% |
| 2009 | 2,084,492 | ▼30.1% |
| 2010 | 2,215,227 | ▲6.3% |
| 2011 | 2,503,820 | ▲13.7% |
| 2012 | 2,595,717 | ▲3.7% |
| 2013 | 2,786,078 | ▲7.3% |
| 2014 | 2,935,008 | ▲5.3% |
| 2015 | 3,082,366 | ▲5.0% |
| 2016 | 3,042,773 | ▼1.3% |
| 2017 | 3,002,241 | ▼1.3% |
| 2018 | 2,954,037 | ▼1.5% |
| 2019 | 2,887,046 | ▼2.3% |
| 2020 | 2,547,339 | ▼11.8% |
| 2021 | 2,218,228 | ▼12.9% |
| 2022 | 2,274,088 | ▲2.5% |
| 2023 | 2,594,698 | ▲14.1% |
| 2024 | 2,705,080 | ▲4.2% |
| 2025 | 2,853,299 | ▲5.5% |

GM worldwide 2019 vehicle sales
| Location | Total sales | Year-On-Year change | Year-On-Year change (%) |
|---|---|---|---|
| GM North America | 3,367,374 | (122,740) | (3.5) |
| GM Europe | 3,590 | (266) | (6.9) |
| GM South America | 668,842 | (21,355) | (3.1) |
| GM International | 584,520 | 28,033 | 5.0 |
| China | 3,093,604 | (551,440) | (15.1) |
| Total | 7,717,930 | (667,768) | (8.0) |

=== Management ===
==== Current board of directors ====
Notable members of the board of directors of the company are as follows:

- Mary Barra, Chairman and CEO of General Motors
- Joseph Ashton, former Vice President of the International Union at United Automobile Workers
- Linda Gooden, former Vice President of Information Systems and Global Solutions at Lockheed Martin
- Joseph Jimenez, CEO of Novartis
- Jane Mendillo, former President and CEO at Harvard Management Company
- Michael Mullen, former Chairman of the Joint Chiefs of Staff
- James Mulva, former CEO, President, and Chairman at ConocoPhillips
- Patricia Russo, CEO of Hewlett Packard Enterprise
- Thomas Schoewe, former CFO of Wal-Mart Stores
- Theodore Solso, former CEO and Chairman of Cummins
- Carol Stephenson, former dean at Ivey Business School
- Devin Wenig, former President and CEO of eBay
- Jon McNeill, CEO of DVx Ventures LLC

==== Chairmen of the Board of General Motors ====
- Thomas Neal – November 19, 1912 – November 16, 1915
- Pierre S. du Pont – November 16, 1915 – February 7, 1929
- Lammot du Pont II – February 7, 1929 – May 3, 1937
- Alfred P. Sloan Jr. – May 3, 1937 – April 2, 1956
- Albert Bradley – April 2, 1956 – August 31, 1958
- Frederic G. Donner – September 1, 1958 – October 31, 1967
- James M. Roche – November 1, 1967 – December 31, 1971
- Richard C. Gerstenberg – January 1 – November 30, 1974
- Thomas A. Murphy – December 1, 1974 – December 31, 1980
- Roger B. Smith – January 1, 1981 – July 31, 1990
- Robert C. Stempel – August 1, 1990 – November 1, 1992
- John G. Smale – November 2, 1992 – December 31, 1995
- John F. Smith Jr. – January 1, 1996 – April 30, 2003
- Rick Wagoner – May 1, 2003 – March 30, 2009
- Kent Kresa – March 30 – July 10, 2009
- Edward Whitacre Jr. – July 10, 2009 – December 31, 2010
- Daniel Akerson – December 31, 2010 – January 15, 2014
- Tim Solso – January 15, 2014 – January 4, 2016
- Mary Barra – January 4, 2016 – Present

==== Chief Executive Officers of General Motors ====
- Alfred P. Sloan Jr. – May 10, 1923 – June 3, 1946
- Charles Erwin Wilson – June 3, 1946 – January 26, 1953
- Harlow H. Curtice – February 2, 1953 – August 31, 1958
- James M. Roche – November 1, 1967 – December 31, 1971
- Richard C. Gerstenberg – January 1, 1972 – November 30, 1974
- Thomas A. Murphy – December 1, 1974 – December 31, 1980
- Roger B. Smith – January 1, 1981 – July 31, 1990
- Robert C. Stempel – August 1, 1990 – November 1, 1992
- John F. Smith Jr. – November 2, 1992 – May 31, 2000
- Rick Wagoner – June 1, 2000 – March 30, 2009
- Frederick Henderson – March 30 – December 1, 2009
- Edward Whitacre Jr. – December 1, 2009 – September 1, 2010
- Daniel Akerson – September 1, 2010 – January 15, 2014
- Mary Barra – January 15, 2014 – Present

== Labor conflicts ==
General Motors' American workers are unionized generally under the United Auto Workers (UAW), the primary labor union representing automotive workers in the United States.

=== Flint sit-down strike ===
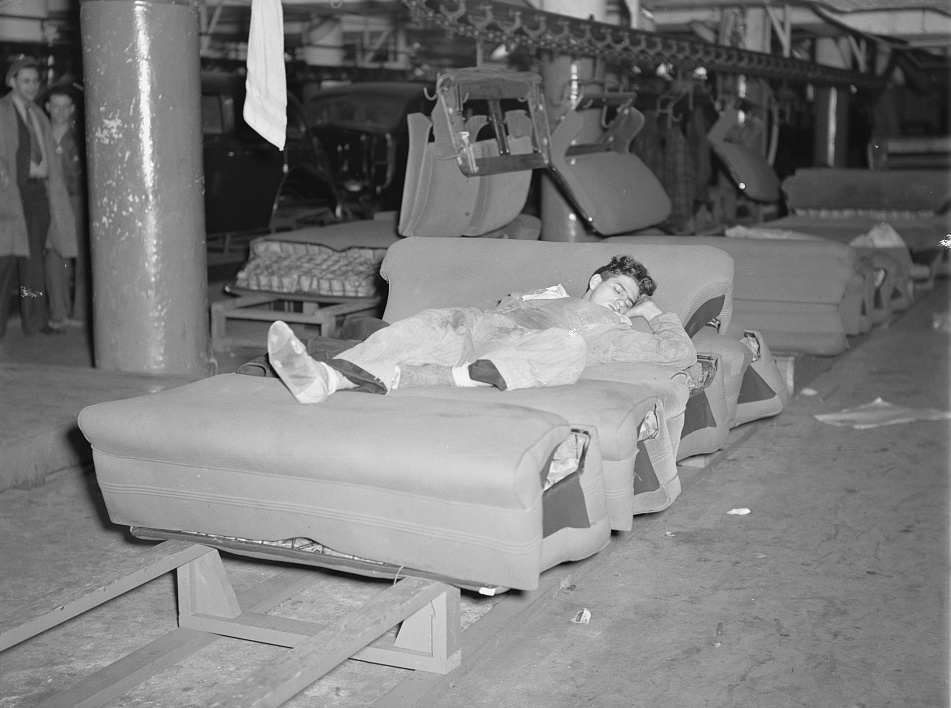
Young striker off sentry duty sleeping on the assembly line of auto seats

The 1936–1937 Flint sit-down strike against General Motors changed the UAW from a collection of isolated local unions on the fringes of the industry into a major labor union and led to the unionization of the domestic United States automobile industry.

After the first convention of UAW in 1936, the union decided that it could not survive by piecemeal organizing campaigns at smaller plants, as it had in the past, but that it could organize the automobile industry only by going after its biggest and most powerful employer, General Motors, focusing on GM's production complex in Flint, Michigan.

Organizing in Flint was a difficult and dangerous plan. GM controlled city politics in Flint and kept a close eye on outsiders. According to Wyndham Mortimer, the UAW officer put in charge of the organizing campaign in Flint, he received a death threat by an anonymous caller when he visited Flint in 1936. GM also maintained an extensive network of spies throughout its plants. This forced UAW members to keep the names of new members secret and meeting workers at their homes.

As the UAW studied its target, it discovered that GM had only two factories that produced the dies from which car body components were stamped: one in Flint that produced the parts for Buicks, Pontiacs, and Oldsmobiles, and another in Cleveland that produced Chevrolet parts.

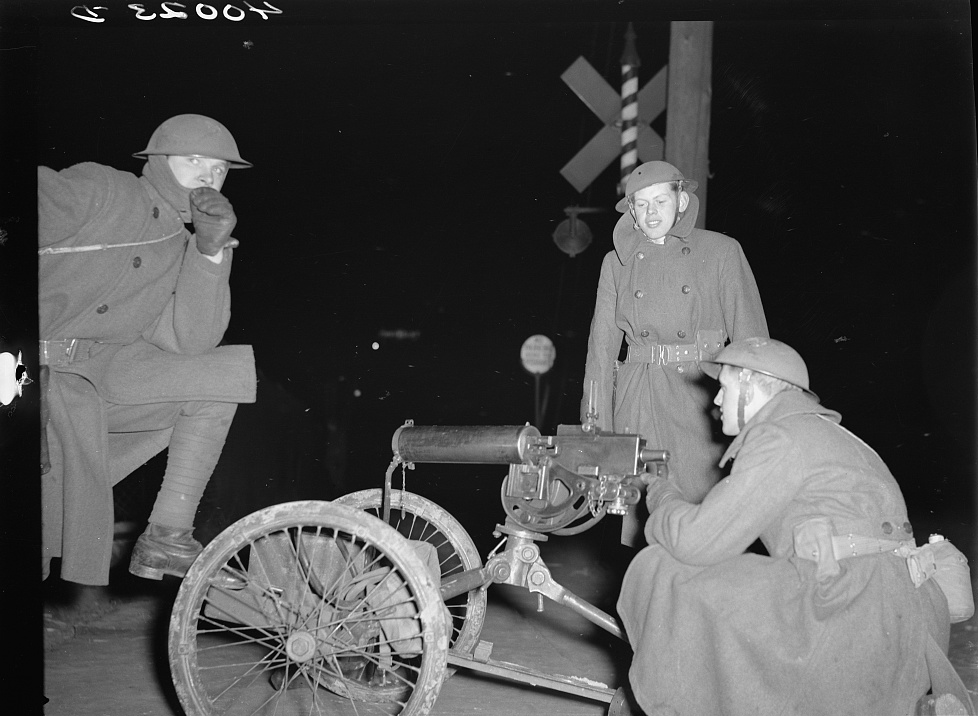
National Guardsmen with machine guns overlooking Chevrolet factories number nine and number four

While the UAW called for a sit-down strike in Flint, the police, armed with guns and tear gas, attempted to enter the Fisher Body 2 plant on January 11, 1937. The strikers inside the plant pelted them with hinges, bottles, and bolts. At the time, Vice President John Nance Garner supported federal intervention to break up the Flint Strike, but this idea was rejected by President Franklin D. Roosevelt. The president urged GM to distinguish a union so the plants could re-open. The strike ended after 44 days.

That development forced GM to bargain with the union. John L. Lewis, President of the United Mine Workers and founder and leader of the Congress of Industrial Organizations, spoke for the UAW in those negotiations; UAW President Homer Martin was sent on a speaking tour to keep him out of the way. GM's representatives refused to be in the same room as the UAW, so Governor Frank Murphy acted as a courier and intermediary between the two groups. Governor Murphy sent in the U.S. National Guard not to evict the strikers but rather to protect them from the police and corporate strike-breakers. The two parties finally reached an agreement on February 11, 1937, on a one-page agreement that recognized the UAW as the exclusive bargaining representative for GM's employees, who were union members for the next six months.

=== Tool and die strike of 1939 ===
The tool and die strike of 1939, also known as the "strategy strike", was an ultimately successful attempt by the UAW to be recognized as the sole representative for General Motors workers. In addition to representation rights, the UAW, working jointly with the Congress of Industrial Organizations (CIO), sought to resolve existing grievances of skilled workers.

=== United Auto Workers (UAW) strike of 1945–1946 ===
From November 21, 1945, until March 13, 1946, (113 days) the UAW organized "320,000 hourly workers" to form a US-wide strike against the General Motors Corporation, workers used the tactic of the sit down strike. It was "the longest strike against a major manufacturer" that the UAW had yet seen, and it was also "the longest national GM strike in its history". As director of the UAW's General Motors Department (coordinator of union relations with GM), Walter Reuther suggested to his colleagues the idea of striking the GM manufacturing plants with a 'one-at-a-time' strategy, which was "intended to maximize pressure on the target company". Reuther also put forth the demands of the strikers: a 30 percent increase in wages and a hold on product prices. However, the strike ended with the dissatisfaction of Walter Reuther and the UAW, and the workers received only a 17.5-percent increase in wages.

=== 2007 General Motors strike ===
The 2007 General Motors strike was a strike from September 24 to 26, 2007, by the UAW against General Motors.

On September 24, 2007, General Motors workers represented by the UAW union went on strike against the company. The first US-wide strike against GM since 1970 was expected to idle 59 plants and facilities for an indefinite period of time. Talks broke down after more than 20 straight days of bargaining failed to produce a new contract. Major issues that proved to be stumbling blocks for an agreement included wages, benefits, job security and investments in US facilities.

Two car assembly plants in Oshawa, Ontario and a transmission facility in Windsor closed on September 25. However, on September 26, a tentative agreement was reached, and the strike's end was announced by UAW officials in a news conference at 4 a.m. By the following day, all GM workers in both countries were back to work.

=== 2019 General Motors strike ===
On September 15, 2019, after talks broke down to renew their contract, which expired earlier that day, the UAW announced that GM employees would begin striking at 11:59 pm. This strike shut down operations in nine states, including 33 manufacturing plants and 22 parts distribution warehouses. After 40 days, on October 25, 2019, the "longest strike by autoworkers in a decade" and the longest against GM since 1970 came to an end when United Auto Workers members voted to approve a new contract with GM. Striking labor union members received a $275 a week strike pay salary for the duration of the strike. The strike cost GM more than $2 billion.

=== 2023 United Auto Workers strike ===
The 2023 strike launched by the UAW was the first strike against all three major American automakers in history. Then-recently elected UAW president Shawn Fain stated that he was "fed up" with the current situation between workers and automakers; Fain specifically blasted the tiered workers system at automakers, failure for automakers to keep wages up with inflation, pensions, as well as the introduction of a four-day workweek as opposed to the five-day workweek. GM CEO Mary Barra protested that her company offered an "unprecedented deal" which gave workers 20% raises as well as "world-class" healthcare. Barra further stated that meeting all 1,000 plus demands would bankrupt the company and cost over $100 billion.

== Controversies ==
=== Opposition to environmental legislation ===
General Motors has sought to influence the US and Canadian governments to weaken or remove environmental regulations governing its products in 2025. General Motors supported a Senate vote to repeal the California Air Resources Board's Advanced Clean Cars II regulation in May 2025, which would require the company to sell an increasing amount of zero-emissions vehicles in participating US states. General Motors is reported to have encouraged employees to privately lobby US senators to oppose the rule, and supported the Transportation Freedom Act, a bill that would repeal the Advanced Clean Cars II rule in March 2025. In Canada, General Motors Canada signed a joint letter issued to Prime Minister Carney requesting the government abandon the Electric Vehicle Availability Standard.

General Motors is a member of multiple industry associations that have opposed environmental regulations, such as the Alliance for Automotive Innovation, the US Chamber of Commerce, the Truck and Engine Manufacturers Association, and the Business Roundtable, where GM's CEO Mary Barra is a board member.

=== Streetcar conspiracy ===
Between 1938 and 1950, GM allegedly deliberately monopolized the sale of buses and supplies to National City Lines (NCL) and its subsidiaries, in violation of the Sherman Antitrust Act of 1890, intending to dismantle streetcar systems in many cities in the United States and make buses, sold by GM, the dominant form of public transport.

=== Ralph Nader and the Corvair ===
1961–63 Corvair swing-axle rear suspension

Unsafe at Any Speed: The Designed-In Dangers of the American Automobile by Ralph Nader, published in 1965, is a book accusing car manufacturers of being slow to introduce safety features and reluctant to spend money on improving safety. It relates to the first models of the Chevrolet Corvair (1960–1964) that had a swing axle suspension design that was prone to 'tuck under' in certain circumstances. To compensate for the removal of a front stabilizer bar (anti-roll bar) as a cost-cutting measure, Corvairs required tire pressures that were outside of the tire manufacturer's recommended tolerances. The Corvair relied on an unusually high front to rear pressure differential (15 psi front, 26 psi rear, when cold; 18 psi and 30 psi hot), and if one inflated the tires equally, as was standard practice for all other cars at the time, the result was dangerous over-steer.

In early March 1966, several media outlets, including The New Republic and The New York Times, reported that GM had tried to discredit Ralph Nader, hiring private detectives to tap his phones and investigate his past, and hiring prostitutes to trap him in compromising situations. Nader sued the company for invasion of privacy and settled the case for $425,000. Nader's lawsuit against GM was ultimately decided by the New York Court of Appeals, whose opinion in the case expanded tort law to cover "overzealous surveillance". Nader used the proceeds from the lawsuit to start the pro-consumer Center for Study of Responsive Law.

A 1972 safety commission report conducted by Texas A&M University concluded that the 1960–1963 Corvair possessed no greater potential for loss of control than its contemporary competitors in extreme situations. The United States Department of Transportation (DOT) issued a press release in 1972 describing the findings of NHTSA testing from the previous year. NHTSA conducted a series of comparative tests in 1971 studying the handling of the 1963 Corvair and four contemporary cars – a Ford Falcon, Plymouth Valiant, Volkswagen Beetle, and Renault Dauphine – along with a second-generation Corvair (with its completely redesigned, independent rear suspension). The 143-page report reviewed NHTSA's extreme-condition handling tests, national crash-involvement data for the cars in the test as well as General Motors' internal documentation regarding the Corvair's handling.

In 1980, former GM executive John DeLorean wrote in his book On a Clear Day You Can See General Motors that Nader's criticisms were valid.

Journalist David E. Davis said that despite Nader's claim that swing-axle rear suspension were dangerous, Porsche, Mercedes-Benz, and Volkswagen all used similar swing-axle concepts during that era.

=== Mcgee v. General Motors Corp. ===
McGee v. General Motors was a 1998 court case in which the jury awarded plaintiffs Robert and Connie McGee $60 million. The trial revealed hidden information about a General Motors fuel tank design. General Motors (GM) was alleged to have sacrificed vehicle safety measures in favor of additional profit. This case was featured on CNN, 60 Minutes, The New York Times, and USA Today.

=== Apartheid ===
In 2002, GM (along with other multinational corporations) was sued by a group of South Africans represented by the Khulumani Support Group. The plaintiffs alleged that the company provided vehicles to the South African security forces during the Apartheid. The company settled with the plaintiffs in 2012, agreeing to pay a sum of up to $1.5 million.

=== Ignition switch recall ===
In May 2014, the National Highway Traffic Safety Administration fined the company $35 million for failing to recall cars with faulty ignition switches for a decade, despite knowing there was a problem with the switches. There were 124 deaths linked to General Motors' deliberate failure to recall the cars, and the company paid compensation as a result: the $35 million fine was the maximum the regulator could impose. The total cost of the recall was estimated to be $1.5 billion. As well as the Cobalts, the switches of concern had been installed in many other cars, such as the Pontiac G5, the Saturn Ion, the Chevrolet HHR, the Saturn Sky, and Pontiac Solstice. The recall involved about 2.6 million GM cars worldwide.

=== Forced Uyghur labor ===
In 2020, the Australian Strategic Policy Institute accused at least 82 major brands, including General Motors, of being connected to forced Uyghur labor in Xinjiang.

=== Sale of driver data to insurance companies ===
General Motors has come under criticism for collecting highly detailed driver data and selling the personal information to insurance companies without consumers' consent or knowledge. Texas attorney general Ken Paxton sued General Motors on August 13, 2024, alleging that General Motors sold the information to at least two companies, LexisNexis Risk Solutions and Verisk Analytics, who then sold the information to insurance companies. In October 2026, GM reached a settlement with 36 attorneys general to pay a $220 million fine.

== Philanthropy ==
From 1976 until it was terminated in 2017, philanthropic activity was carried out via the General Motors Foundation.

General Motors has fundraised for and donated cash and vehicles to the Nature Conservancy.

Since 1997, GM has been a source of funding for Safe Kids Worldwide's "Safe Kids Buckle Up" program, an initiative to ensure child automobile safety through education and inspection.

== See also ==
- Alliance of Automobile Manufacturers
- ASOTRECOL
- Crucible Industries
- EcoCAR
- General Motors Hy-wire
- General Motors proving grounds
- General Motors Technical Center
- GM people
- GM vehicles by brand
- List of automobile manufacturers of the United States
- List of GM engines
- List of General Motors factories
- List of General Motors platforms
- List of GM transmissions
- Marinediesel AB
- United States Council for Automotive Research
- VIA Motors
- Freon
- Global Climate Coalition
- Ethyl Corporation
- Durant Motors
- List of automotive manufacturers by production
