= Thomas Schoewe =

Thomas M. Schoewe (born 1952) was the chief financial officer and executive vice president of Wal-Mart Stores, Inc. until January 2011. He was with the company since taking his positions in January 2000. Prior to joining Wal-Mart he was with Black and Decker where he held the same positions of CFO and executive vice president from 1993 to 1999. He attended Loyola University Chicago where he graduated with a Bachelor of Business Administration degree in finance. He served on the board of directors at General Motors.
