= Truck and Engine Manufacturers Association =

Truck and Engine Manufacturers Association (EMA)
- President: Jacqueline Gelb
- Type: Industry Association
- Website: Official website
- Founded: 1995

The Truck and Engine Manufacturers Association (EMA) is a trade association representing global vehicle manufacturers policy interests United States. The association lobbies the federal government to advance the policy interests of its members. The group has consistently advocated to weaken emissions standards for vehicles, and is opposed to California's regulations for heavy-duty vehicles. The group also engages on issues related to trade, vehicle safety, manufacturing, tariffs, and other regulatory issues relevant to the heavy-duty industry.

== Members ==
The Truck and Engine Manufacturers Association (EMA) has 30 members. Member companies are largely American, German, and Japanese engine and vehicle manufacturers.

Company
AGCO Corporation
Blue Bird Corporation
Briggs & Stratton, LLC.
Catterpillar Inc.
CNH Industrial
Cummins Inc.
Daimler Truck North America LLC
Deere & Company
DEUTZ Corporation
FPT Industrial
Generac Power Systems
General Motors LLC
Hino Motors Manufacturing U.S.A., Inc.
INNIO
International Motors, LLC
Isuzu Technical Center of America, Inc.
JCB Power System
Kawasaki Motors Corp., USA
Komatsu Ltd.
Kubota Engine America Corporation
Liebherr Machines Bulle SA
MAN Truck & Bus SE
PACCAR Inc
Rolls-Royce Solutions America Inc.
Scania CV AB
Stellantis NV
Volvo Group North America, Inc.
Wärtsilä North America, Inc.
Yanmar America Corporation

== Position on regulations ==
=== GHG emissions regulations ===
The Truck and Engine Manufacturers Association (EMA) supported the Trump administration EPA's proposal to repeal the GHG emissions standards enacted by the Biden administration, and also to repeal the 2009 Endangerment Finding. The association stated that it "supports the proposal to curtail the scope of the Agency's authority to regulate GHGs, specifically as it related to the proposed rescission of the Phase 3 Standards under the major questions doctrine." The EMA advocated for the EPA to include various measures to make the repeal of the standards more litigation resistant, such as including an independent rescission of the GHG emissions separate from the repeal of the 2009 Endangerment Finding in the agency's final rule.

Under the Biden administration, the EMA opposed the administrations GHG regulations for heavy-duty vehicles. The EMA advocated to delay the standards by phasing-in the regulations more slowly, weaken the stringency of the standards by lowering the starting stringency they would move from, and to link the stringency of standards to deployment of zero-emission vehicle refueling infrastructure.
