= Carol Stephenson =

Carol Stephenson, OC is a Canadian business executive and the recently retired dean of the Ivey Business School at the University of Western Ontario.

== Career ==
Born in Petrolia, Ontario, Stephenson began her career at Bell Canada in 1973, after graduating from the University of Toronto with a Bachelor of Arts degree. She rose to become an executive in the corporation in 1988 and held various senior positions at the company, including Vice President of Bell Canada and President and Chief Operating Officer (Americas) of BCE Media. She then served as Group Vice President, Strategic Guidance and, from 1995 to 1998, President and CEO of Stentor Resource Centre Inc. (now the Stentor Alliance). She was President and CEO of Lucent Technologies Canada from 1999 to 2003. She joined the Richard Ivey School of Business in 2003.

The 2010 Ontario Salary Disclosure listed her salary at $405,000 CAD, making her the second highest paid employee at the University of Western Ontario, trailing only the president.

== Recognition and awards ==
The Canadian Women in Communications Association named her Woman of the Year in 1995. In 2000, Ryerson University awarded her an honorary doctorate in engineering. In 2001, she received the Woman of Distinction designation from the YWCA, and in 2005, Stephenson was inducted into the Hall of Fame of the Canadian Information Productivity Awards for her contribution in building a competitive telecommunications industry in Canada. In 2012, she was inducted into the London and District Business Hall of Fame in London, Ontario.

In 2009, she was made an Officer of the Order of Canada "for her contributions to the development of our national telecommunications industry and for implementing innovative changes to business school education in Canada".

== Board and committee appointments ==
She was named to the board of directors of the post-bankruptcy General Motors in July 2009 as a representative of Canada Holdings, and had previously served on the board of General Motors Canada. She also serves as a director of Intact Financial Services (formerly ING Canada) and was previously a director of the Ontario Teachers' Pension Plan.

From 2005 to 2007, Stephenson was a member of the Prime Minister's Advisory Council on Science and Technology and is a former Chair of the Ontario Research Fund Advisory Board.

From 2015 to 2019, she was chair of the Board of Directors for the Trillium Network for Advanced Manufacturing, in London, Ontario.

== Education ==
Along with her Bachelor of Arts degree, Stephenson completed the Executive Program at the Graduate School of Business Administration, University of California at Berkeley in 1989, and the six-week Advanced Management Program at Harvard Business School in 1994.
