= Mark of Excellence =

Trademark of the General Motors Company

One World, One GM

The Mark of Excellence is a former trademark of General Motors Corporation. It was first introduced at GM's pavilion at the 1964 New York World's Fair. The logo consisted of the original "GM" logo with the phrase "Mark of Excellence" at the bottom. As a decal, it was installed on the doorjambs of General Motors' vehicles beginning in 1966. This logo also was stamped on the release buttons of seat belt buckles on GM vehicles from 1967 until 1996, as well as being stamped onto the ignition and door keys from 1969 up until 2002, and has also appeared on the windows of certain GM vehicles. Originally turquoise, the color was changed to a royal blue in 1968.

The "Mark of Excellence" was the subject of the first case considered by the National Advertising Review Board, in 1972. The NARB ruled that the mark was not being used in a manner that constituted false advertising, but warned that, given GM's record of product recalls, the slogan could be seen as deceptive if it became a primary theme of GM's auto advertising.

The phrase "Mark of Excellence" and its appearance on the logo was phased out by the 1980s.

In 2005, it was announced that small silver emblems of the logo would be applied to the exterior of every 2006 GM vehicle. This was continued into 2007. A decision was made in August 2009 to stop using the GM "Mark of Excellence" badge on GM vehicles. GM explained this decision as a result of its post-bankruptcy focus on four core brands—and a reduced focus on the GM brand. Marketing surveys also indicated that customers had more positive attitudes about the specific core brands than about the GM corporate brand.

The "Mark of Excellence" is also an award given by Chevrolet/GM to dealerships for superior sales volume and customer satisfaction.
