= Latin America Working Group =

Founded in 1983, the Latin America Working Group (LAWG) is one of the United States' longest-standing coalitions dedicated to foreign policy. LAWG and its sister organization, the Latin America Working Group Education Fund, work with over 60 major religious, humanitarian, grassroots and policy organizations to influence decision makers in Washington, D.C.

== History ==
In 1983, seeking to respond to the humanitarian crisis in Central America and to U.S. policies that backed armies that slaughtered civilians, U.S. churches, grassroots and policy groups sought a coordinated way to respond. Working out of borrowed office space, with one or two paid staff, the Central America Working Group, as it was then called, served to organize, educate, and inspire activists advocating peace and justice in Central America. CAWG developed allies in Congress, the media and the public to end military assistance to the Salvadoran and Guatemalan governments and the Nicaraguan Contras. After the wars ended, CAWG coordinated efforts to encourage implementation of historic peace agreements and support the search for truth by helping to spur the declassification of thousands of U.S. documents for Central American truth commissions. In the early 1990s, the groups participating in CAWG coalition decided, rather than to disband, to expand their issues, becoming the Latin America Working Group. The LAWG has worked since then to call for disaster relief and development aid to the region, successfully lift the embargo on the sale of food and medicine to Cuba, lift the restrictions on Cuban-American travel and advocate for an end to the full travel ban, cut military aid and increase humanitarian aid to Colombia, support the struggle for fair elections in Mexico, and advocate for just border policies that recognize the human rights of migrants and border communities. LAWG is organized as a 501 (c) 4 nonprofit, which carries out advocacy, while its affiliated organization, the Latin America Working Group Education Fund, a 501 (c) 3 nonprofit, carries out educational activities.

== Achievements ==
LAWG was involved in opposing the U.S. role in Central American wars during the 1980s and in supporting the negotiated peace settlements that took hold in the region by the 1990s. Since then, LAWG gained U.S. support to implement Central American peace accords and to declassify documents that shed light on human rights abuses in Latin America and U.S. policies. LAWG helped secure several billion dollars in U.S. disaster relief in the wake of earthquakes and hurricanes that devastated Central America and Haiti. LAWG changed the balance of U.S. aid to Colombia, decreasing military aid and increasing aid for development and victims of violence, and helped ensure U.S. government attention to abuses in Mexico and Colombia. LAWG's efforts assisted the easing of restrictions on the sale of food and medicine to Cuba and restrictions on the right of U.S. citizens to travel to Cuba.
