= Retarder (mechanical engineering) =

Device for slowing down large vehicles

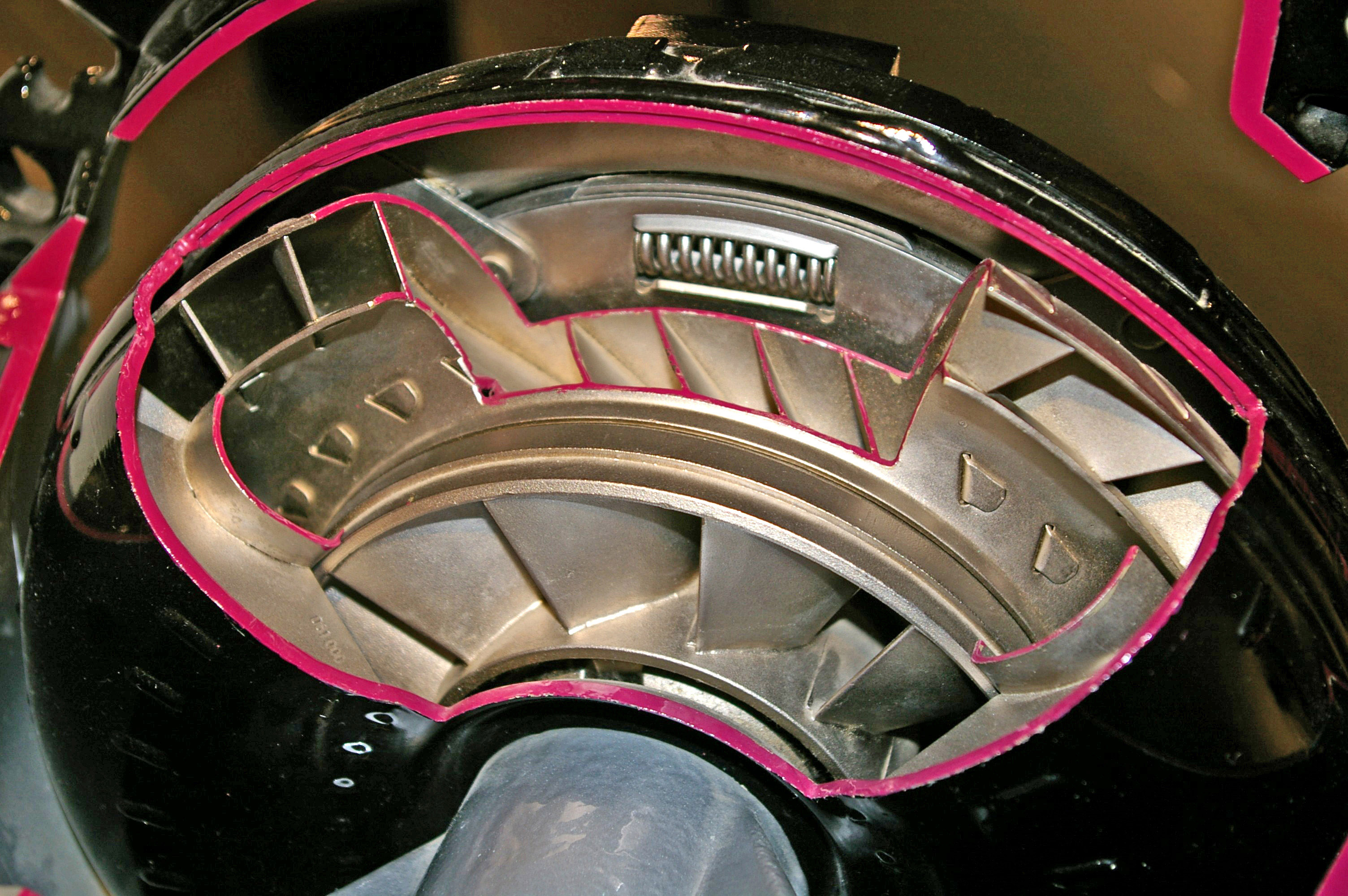
Torque converter, opened, interior similar to a retarder

A retarder is a device used to augment or replace some of the functions of primary friction-based braking systems, usually on heavy vehicles. Retarders serve to slow vehicles, or maintain a steady speed while traveling down a hill, and help prevent the vehicle from unintentional or uncontrolled acceleration when travelling on a road surface with an uneven grade. They are not usually capable of bringing vehicles to a standstill because their effectiveness diminishes as a vehicle's speed lowers. Instead, they are typically used as an aid to slow vehicles, with the final braking done by a conventional friction braking system. An added benefit retarders can provide is an increase in the service life of the friction brake, as it is used less often, particularly at higher speeds. With air-actuated brakes they also serve a dual purpose in conserving air pressure.

Friction-based braking systems are susceptible to brake fade when used extensively for continuous periods. This can be dangerous if braking performance drops below what is required to stop the vehicle, for instance, if a truck or bus is descending a long decline and would otherwise require something like a runaway truck ramp to stop safely. For this reason, such heavy vehicles are frequently fitted with a supplementary system that is not friction-based.

Retarders are not restricted to road motor vehicles, but may also be used in railway systems. The British prototype Advanced Passenger Train (APT) used hydraulic retarders to allow the high-speed train to stop in the same distance as standard lower speed trains, as a pure friction-based system was not viable.

== Engine brake ==
=== Diesel-powered vehicles ===
Diesel engines regulate power output purely by the volume and timing of fuel injected into the combustion chambers. The engine braking generated by creating partial vacuum with a closed throttle at each intake stroke in petrol/gasoline engines does not apply to vehicles equipped with diesel engines, as such engines are quite "free-running". However Clessie L. Cummins, founder of Cummins Engine Company, realized that by opening the cylinder exhaust valves when the piston reached top dead centre, rather than at the end of the power stroke, the accumulated compressed air in the cylinder could be vented before it could act as a "spring" to drive the piston back down again. By doing this, the engine acts as an air compressor, with the energy coming from the transmission used to compress the air, hence slowing the vehicle. The amount of power extracted from the transmission can be up to 90% of the rated power of the engine for certain engines.

In a compression release engine braking system for a turbocharged internal combustion engine, excessive stress associated with opening the exhaust valves of the engine near top dead center of engine compression strokes when the engine is turning at high speed is prevented by reducing the intake manifold pressure from what it otherwise would be at that high speed. This is done by retarding the turbocharger so that its speed is less than it otherwise would be at high engine speed.

This type of retarder is known as compression release engine brake or "Jake brake". A disadvantage of this system is that it becomes very noisy in operation, particularly if the exhaust muffler is faulty; its use is therefore banned in some locales. Type 2A test is required to certify the engine brake efficiency.

=== Exhaust brake ===
Exhaust brakes are simpler in operation than an engine brake. Essentially, the exhaust pipe of the vehicle is restricted by a valve. This raises the pressure in the exhaust system, forcing the engine to work harder on the exhaust stroke of its cylinders, so again the engine is acting as an air compressor, with the power required to compress the air being withheld from the exhaust pipe, retarding the vehicle. Turbocharger retarders that restrict the flow of exhaust gas can also help in increasing the exhaust pressure to achieve the same objective.

== Hydraulic retarder ==
Hydraulic retarders use the viscous drag forces between dynamic and static vanes in a fluid-filled chamber to achieve retardation. There are several different types which can use standard transmission fluid (gear oil), a separate oil supply, water, or a mix of oil and magnetic retardation. Magnetic retarders are similar to the electric retarder discussed below.

A simple retarder uses vanes attached to a transmission driveshaft between the clutch and roadwheels. They can also be driven separately via gears off a driveshaft. The vanes are enclosed in a static chamber with small clearances to the chamber's walls (which will also be vaned), as in an automatic transmission. When retardation is required, fluid (oil or water) is pumped into the chamber, and the viscous drag induced will slow the vehicle. The working fluid will heat, and is usually circulated through a cooling system. The degree of retardation can be varied by adjusting the fill level of the chamber.

Hydraulic retarders are extremely quiet, often inaudible over the sound of a running engine, and are especially quiet in operation compared to engine brakes.

== Electric retarder ==
Electric retarders use electromagnetic induction to provide a retardation force. An electric retardation unit can be placed on an axle, transmission, or driveline and consists of a rotor attached to the axle, transmission, or driveline—and a stator securely attached to the vehicle chassis. There are no contact surfaces between the rotor and stator, and no working fluid. When retardation is required, the electrical windings in the stator receive power from the vehicle battery, producing a magnetic field through which the rotor moves. This induces eddy currents in the rotor, which produces an opposing magnetic field to the stator. The opposing magnetic fields slows the rotor, and hence the axle, transmission or driveshaft to which it is attached. The rotor incorporates internal vanes (like a ventilated brake disk) to provide its own air cooling, so no load is placed on the vehicle's engine cooling system. The operation of the system is extremely quiet.

A hybrid vehicle drivetrain uses electrical retardation to assist the mechanical brakes, while recycling the energy. The electric traction motor acts as a generator to charge the battery. The power stored in the battery is available to help the vehicle accelerate.

Regenerative braking and eddy current braking are separate types of electric braking. Regenerative braking might not be classified as a retarder as it uses no extra physical hardware in addition to the existing rotor/stator pair of the motor. It effectuates braking by using the electric field created by the rotational inertia in the rotor/stator that is delivered into the rotor by the momentum of the vehicle (wheels). Additional circuitry in the controller is used to manage this current flow from the stator windings into the battery, some of which dissipates as heat within the circuitry of the controller.

In contrast, eddy current retarder brakes comprise a distinct and purpose-built static armature and rotor that are explicitly made and added to a vehicle for braking and dissipation of heat and not for motive power; it is a purpose-built system distinct from the motor.

Finally, "dynamic" braking is the complex use of controller braking where the controller can be used either for regenerative braking or by switching the circuit to feed the current to resistors. In this latter way "rheostatic" braking can be achieved. Whereas an eddy brake relies on eddy currents to create magnetic resistance some of which is incidentally dissipated as heat, rheostatic braking relies on controller circuitry resistors which directly dissipate current-borne electric energy as heat. Some dynamic braking vehicles describe the rheostatic braking as "plug" braking. In particular, forklift dynamic braking has been developed to take advantage of combining this type of braking with controllers specialized to quickly reverse vehicle direction.

Dynamic and regenerative braking, when used on electric or diesel-electric railroad locomotives, means that the electric motors which usually are used to drive the road wheels are instead used as generators being driven by the wheels on a downslope. In regenerative braking, the electric current created is typically fed back into the power supply (i.e. overhead catenary, third rail), and can be used by other locomotives or stored for later use. In this way a locomotive will receive current while on level ground or traveling uphill, but acts as a current supply when braking, transforming the kinetic energy created from traveling downhill (or less often, converting forward momentum from travel on level ground) into electricity. In a diesel-electric, rather than being generated remotely and collected from a power source, the power supply is generated directly by the onboard prime mover (engine) and transmitted to the motors; there is presently rarely any way of storing electricity up for later use, so instead, the motors are used as generators, retarding the wheel rotation, and the generated power is routed through resistors mounted on the roof of the locomotive, where it is transformed into heat energy (much like an electric heating element) and dissipated into the atmosphere with large fans. While this has the drawback of not re-utilizing the energy created while traveling uphill, it does create a powerful and safe retarding system that is not prone to brake fade or wearing out like mechanical brakes.

== See also ==
- Dowty retarders
- Dynamic braking
- Retarder (railroad)
