= Columbus Engine Plant =

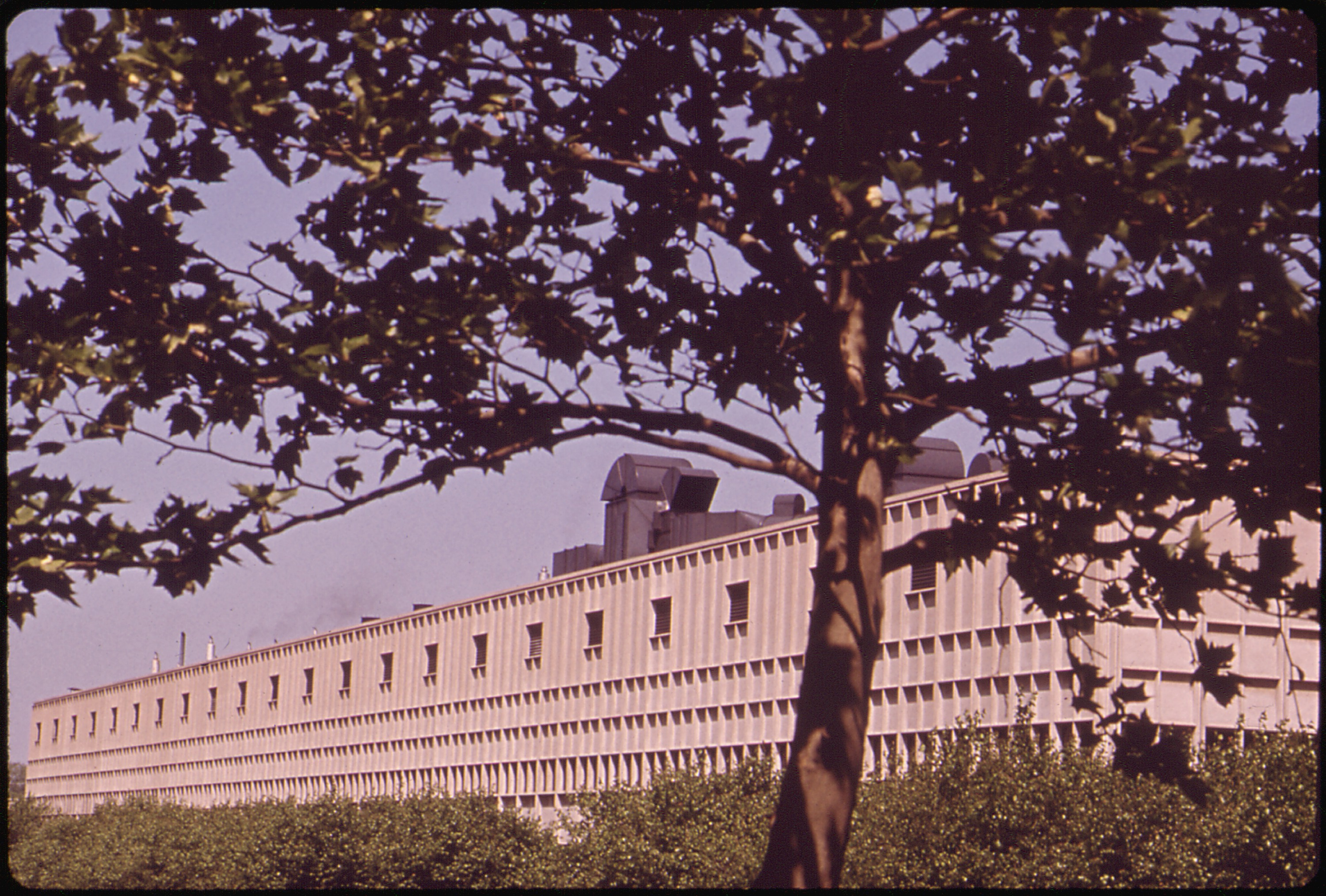
- The plant taken in 1973
- Operated: 1926–present
- Location: 500 Central Avenue; Columbus, Indiana, United States
- Coordinates: 39.2032°N 85.9102°W
- Industry: Automotive
- Products: engines
- Employees: 1,000+
- Volume: 1,400,000 square feet (130,000 m^{2})
- Owner: Cummins Inc.

Columbus Engine Plant (CEP), also known as Plant No. 1, is an engine manufacturing plant in Columbus, Indiana, owned by Cummins Inc. The plant celebrated its 100th anniversary in September 2026.

== History ==
Cummins Inc. was founded as the Cummins Engine Company in Columbus, Indiana on February 3, 1919, by mechanic Clessie Cummins and banker William Glanton Irwin. The company focused on developing the diesel engine, which was invented 20 years earlier.

The plant was opened in January 1926 while Cummins acquired the factory from Reeves & Company (later Emerson-Brantingham), with the former Reeves tractor plant being converted into an engine plant. The plant's first product, the Model F engine (already introduced in 1924), an early high-speed diesel engine with pressurized lubrication and a distributor-type injection pump. It served as Cummins' sole manufacturing facility for over 30 years until the company opened its first international plant in Shotts, Scotland, in 1956.

In the early 1960s, the Columbus Indiana Plant, produced approximately 160 engines a day with a very low repair rate (less than 0.5 per 100 engines). Architect Harry Weese designed major expansions to the Cummins Columbus Engine Plant in 1960 and 1965, building a large manufacturing complex around the original structure. The Cummins Technical Center (CTC), which is near the plant, opened in 1968 and was also designed by Harry Weese.

The company's current corporate and administrative building was opened in 1983, and was designed by architects Kevin Roche and John Dinkeloo on the site of a former railroad yard in Columbus. In the mid-1980s, Cummins employees and engineers led by John C. Walter created Exploded Engine, a deconstructed Cummins NTC-400 Big Cam III diesel made of over 500 real production parts suspended in midair.

In 1996, Cummins completed its $20 million, 50,000-square-foot engine testing facility in the historic site. Also, the plant underwent a major architectural renovation and office addition designed by renowned architect Kevin Roche, which added a new east-side front entry facing Central Avenue along a tree-lined boulevard.

On October 2, 2002, Cummins Inc. avoided full-scale employee layoffs at its main plant by instead cutting back on overtime, trimming its temporary workforce, and scheduling plant shutdown days. A week later on the 9th, Cummins announced it would cease heavy-duty engine production at Plant No. 1 for the first time in company history, and was terminating 200 workers at the plant and shifting production to the Jamestown Engine Plant in Jamestown, New York.

In 2015, the plant resumed full engine assembly starting with the Cummins 5.0L V8 Turbo Diesel engine for the 2016 Nissan Titan pickup truck.

In July 2024, the United States Department of Energy awarded a $75 million grant to Cummins Inc. under the Inflation Reduction Act to support zero-emissions manufacturing at the historic plant. It converted approximately 360,000 square feet of the Columbus Engine Plant for Accelera by Cummins, the company's zero-emissions business segment.

== Products ==
- Cummins Model F engine (1924–1928)
- Cummins Model U engine
- Cummins N14
- Cummins ISX (2001–2003)
- Cummins 5.0L V8 Turbo Diesel (2016–2019)

== See also ==
- Columbus Midrange Engine Plant, another Cummins engine plant in Columbus, Indiana
