= Jacobs Vehicle Systems =

American brake company

- Type: Subsidiary
- Traded as: NYSE: CMI
- Industry: Manufacturing
- Headquarters: Bloomfield, Connecticut; United States
- Area served: Worldwide
- Parent: Cummins
- Website: http://www.jacobsvehiclesystems.com

Jacobs Vehicle Systems, Inc. is an American company that engineers, develops and manufacturers commercial vehicle retarding and valve actuation technologies. The company produces light-duty, medium-duty, and heavy-duty engine brakes, recreational vehicle exhaust brakes, aftermarket parts and tune-up kits to heavy-duty diesel engine manufacturers in its domestic market in America, as well as in Asia and Europe.

Jacobs Vehicle Systems began as a division of Jacobs Manufacturing Company in 1961 and was incorporated as a separate business entity in 1990 with operations based in Bloomfield, Connecticut. The company was operated as a subsidiary of Altra Industrial Motion from 2018 to 2022. On 9 February 2022, Cummins announced an agreement to acquire Jacobs Vehicle Systems from Altra.

== History ==
The Jacobs Engine Brake, better known as the Jake Brake, has been on the market since 1961. The value of an engine retarder had been recognised many years earlier. In England in 1905, the motor car manufacturer Rover provided on its "16-20" model an auxiliary camshaft and modified exhaust cams which, when selected via a camshaft pedal, lifted the exhaust valve twice to every revolution of the shaft, causing air to be taken in from the exhaust pipe on every downward movement of the piston, compressed on the upward stroke, and then exhausted. Rover declared that "the braking effect of this device is very pronounced - in fact, for all ordinary purposes it can be used without recourse to the friction brakes".

Some 26 years later, and despite the advances in friction braking, the need for such a system was experienced by inventor Clessie Cummins. In August 1931, Clessie Cummins, Ford Moyer and Dave Evans driving a Cummins diesel powered Indiana truck from New York to Los Angeles attempted to set a new truck speed record across the continent. All went well until the descent of the Cajon Pass leading into San Bernardino a long and steep gravel road which almost led to the demise of the truck and its driver, Clessie Cummins.

In 1955, Clessie began studying what might be done to turn his engine into an effective “brake”, or vehicle retarder. An idea for a practical method came to Clessie in 1957. The idea revolved around taking advantage of perfectly timed motion already built into Cummins and Detroit Diesel engines; these engines have a third cam on the main camshaft that activates the fuel injector of each cylinder. A simple retrofit mechanism could transfer motion to open the exhaust valve. A patent was ultimately granted by the United States Patent Office.

Although the principles were proven by mechanically transferring the injector motion, a more practical method was to use a fully hydraulic motion and force transfer. The first retarder housings of the prototype design were installed on a Cummins diesel engine in a truck owned and operated by the Sheldon Oil Company. The initial run with the engine brake was to one of their plants just at the eastern base of the grade, down the Sierras on U.S. Route 50 near Lake Tahoe.

In April 1960, Jacobs Manufacturing Company made the decision to establish its new Clessie L. Cummins Division, (now named Jacobs Vehicle Systems) for the manufacture of the engine brake. The first production units for the Cummins NH series engines left the factory in 1961, followed shortly by a brake for the Detroit 71 series.

The firm split in 1986 and chuck manufacturing now takes place in Clemson, South Carolina and engine brake production in Bloomfield.

== Jacobs Vehicle Systems technologies ==
=== Exhaust Brakes ===
Uses back pressure to increase braking power by restricting the flow of exhaust gasses and increasing backpressure inside the engine. The increased backpressure in the engine creates resistance against the pistons, slowing the crankshaft's rotation and helping to control the vehicle speed.

=== Bleeder Brakes ===
The bleeder brake is a simplified version of traditional engine brakes. When the bleeder brake is turned on, a piston extends to its full stroke and stays there, holding the exhaust valve open a small, fixed distance throughout the entire four-stroke engine cycle. Since the bleeder brake only holds the exhaust valve open a fixed distance, it can be designed so that it does not put any load on the camshaft and most of the overhead components.

=== Compression Release Brakes ===
When activated, the Jacobs Engine Brake opens the exhaust valves near the top of the compression stroke, releasing the highly compressed air through the exhaust system. Little energy is returned to the piston, and as the cycle repeats, the energy of the truck's forward motion is dissipated, causing the truck to slow down.

=== Variable Valve Actuation ===
Allows for real-time adjustment to valve opening and closing for precise control of valve motion. By creating a hydraulic link between the cam and the valve, VVA tunes the engine across its operating range.

=== High Power Density ===
Provides large displacement retarding power in small and medium displacement engines. HPD consists of two dedicated rocker arms and two collapsible bridges per cylinder, which enables a second braking event during each engine cycles.

== Customers ==
C&C Trucks, CNHTC, Cummins, DAF, Daimler, Detroit Diesel, Deutz, DFM, Doosan, FAW, FOTON, Fuso, Hino, Hyundai, Navistar, Paccar, SDEC
