= Engine braking =

Retarding forces within an engine used to slow a vehicle

Animation of a diesel engine

Engine braking occurs when the retarding forces within an internal combustion engine are used to slow down a motor vehicle, as opposed to using additional external braking mechanisms such as friction brakes or magnetic brakes.

The term is often confused with several other types of braking, most notably compression-release braking or "jake braking" which uses a different mechanism.

Traffic regulations in many countries require trucks to always drive with an engaged gear, which in turn provides a certain amount of engine braking (viscous losses to the engine oil and air pumped through the engine and friction losses to the cylinder walls and bearings) when no accelerator pedal is applied.

== Engine braking in different engine types ==
=== Gasoline engines ===
The term "engine braking" refers to the braking effect that occurs in gasoline engines when the accelerator pedal is released. This causes fuel injection to cease and the throttle valve to close almost completely, greatly restricting forced airflow from, for example, a turbocharger. The restriction causes a strong manifold vacuum which the cylinders have to work against, sapping much of the potential energy out of the system over time and producing the majority of the engine-braking effect. This vacuum manifold effect can often be amplified by a down-shift, which induces a faster spinning drivetrain to engage with the engine.

Engine braking is a viable method of controlling the speed at which a vehicle travels downhill. By shifting to a lower gear in a manual transmission, or applying "low" mode on an automatic transmission, engine braking reduces the need to repeatedly apply the foot brake, lowering the risk of the brakes overheating.

While some of the braking force is produced due to friction in the drive train, this is negligible compared to the effect from the manifold vacuum caused by the air-flow restriction.

On an automatic transmission, engine braking often spontaneously increases the engine RPM, causing a sudden revving to occur even without applying the accelerator pedal. This is due to the fact that an automatic transmission, as its name implies, automates the inter-mechanical actions in a manual transmission vehicle that would normally be produced from a human driver controlling the clutch pedal and gear shifter with their foot and hand, respectively. As such, the spontaneous revving is the automated reproduction of a manual transmission driving technique called rev-matching.

Rev-matching is used when down-shifting (shift to lower gear) to match the incoming gear's rotational frequency or speed (RPMs) to that of the driveshaft already in motion, requiring a quick "blip" of the throttle while in neutral during the gear shift. This in turn gets the larger (lower) gear up to rotational speed first before engaging the gear. Down-shifting without doing this results in a sudden jerking of the vehicle as the mismatched rotational speeds being engaged produce conflicting forces and directions of momentum.

=== Diesel engines ===
Diesel engines in personal cars provide little engine braking as they are not equipped with a throttle body and thus cannot draw a vacuum in the intake manifold.

In heavy vehicles the engine is often made to provide extra braking power to take some strain off the vehicle's regular brake system and to help avoid overheating the brakes. In its simplest form this consists of a butterfly valve that restricts the exhaust flow. This is referred to as an exhaust brake and mostly found on older trucks. It has a limited effect, and more advanced systems as described below are near universal on newer heavy vehicles.

==== Compression release brake ====
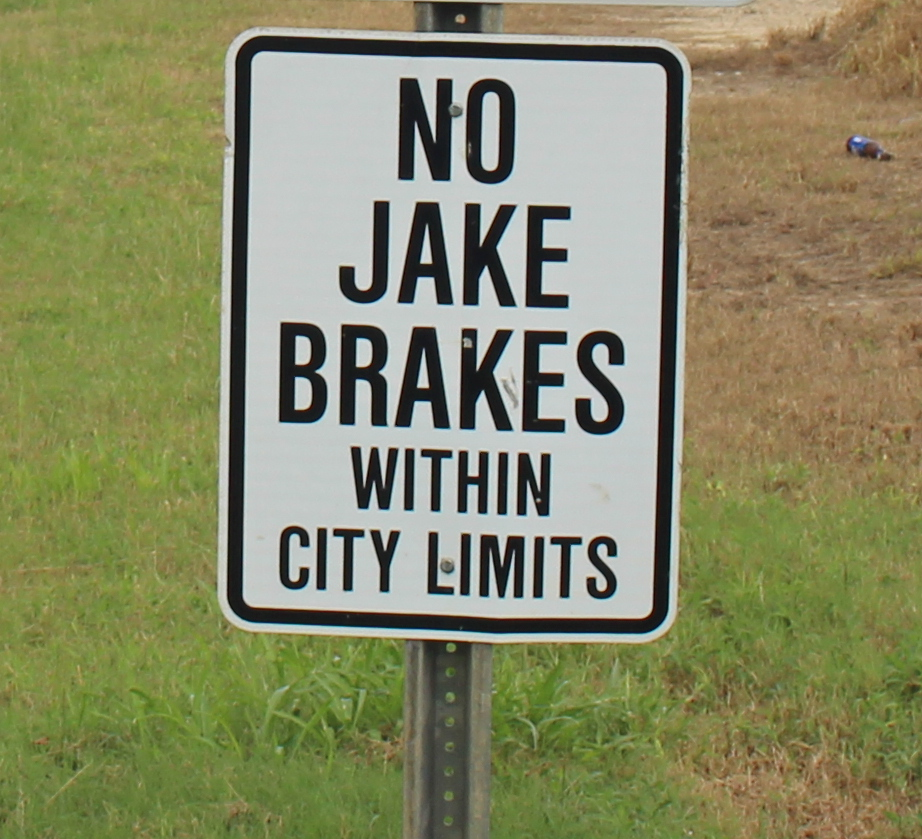
No Jake Brake Sign in Unadilla, Georgia

A compression release brake (also known as a Jacobs brake or "jake brake"), is the type of brake most commonly confused with real engine braking; it is used mainly in large diesel trucks and works by opening the exhaust valves at the top of the compression stroke, so the large amount of energy stored in that compressed air is not returned to the crankshaft but is released into the atmosphere. It is a very effective method of braking, creating large amounts of braking force which significantly extends friction brake life – a 565 hp (421 kW) diesel engine can produce up to 600 hp (450 kW) of braking power at 2,100 RPM.

Normally, during the compression stroke, energy is used as the upward-traveling piston compresses air in the cylinder; the compressed air then acts as a compressed spring and pushes the piston back down. However, with the jake brake in operation, the compressed air is suddenly released just before the piston begins its downward travel (this sudden release of compressed air creates audible sound waves similar to the expanding gases escaping from the muzzle of a firearm). Having lost the energy stored within the compressed air, there is no "spring back" so the engine must expend yet more energy pulling the piston back down again.

This type of brake produces extreme amounts of noise pollution if there is no muffler on the exhaust manifold of the engine, loud enough to disturb the surrounding area. Anecdotally, it sounds similar to a jackhammer, however, the loudness is between 10 and 20 times the sound pressure level of a jackhammer (10 to 13 dB greater). Numerous cities, municipalities, states, and provinces have banned the use of unmuffled compression brakes, which are typically only legal on roads away from populations. In Australia, as of 2008, traffic enforcement cameras were being tested that automatically photograph heavy vehicles that use compression braking.

==== Exhaust brake ====
An exhaust brake works by causing a restriction in the exhaust, much like the intake throttle causes in a gasoline engine. In simple terms, it works by increasing the back-pressure of the exhaust. Nearly all of these brakes are butterfly valves similar to a throttle valve, mounted downstream of the turbocharger if there is one.

==== Exhaust obstructions ====
Modern diesels are subject to many strict controls on emissions and often have many obstructions in the exhaust, which cause them to feel like they have some engine braking like a gasoline engine. The main ones are:

- Turbocharger creates some back-pressure when it is stalled
- Exhaust gas recirculator (EGR) valve redirects exhaust gas back into the engine intake, often through a restricted/narrow pipe.
- Diesel particulate filter (DPF) is designed to capture soot particles that would otherwise be released into the atmosphere; it greatly obstructs exhaust flow and can sap almost as much power as a small air conditioning compressor.

=== Two-stroke engines ===
Engine braking in a premix two-stroke engine can be extremely harmful to the engine, because cylinder and piston lubricant is delivered to each cylinder mixed with fuel. Consequently, during engine braking, the engine starves not only of fuel but also lubricant, causing accelerated wear. Many old two-stroke cars (Saab Automobile, Wartburg 353, etc.) had a freewheel device on the transmission to make engine braking optional. Most two-stroke motorcycle engines since the 1970s have had lubrication by an oil pump, independent of the throttle and fuel system, such as Suzuki's Posi-Force system.

=== Electric motors ===
In electric and hybrid vehicles, electric motors provide the drivetrain resistance, recharging the onboard battery using energy recovered from the vehicle's kinetic motion which would otherwise have been wasted. In hybrid vehicles, the engine runs on electric power to dissipate excess energy when the battery has been fully recharged.

== Applications ==
As soon as the accelerator is released enough to slow the engine, engine braking comes into effect as long as the wheels remain connected via the transmission to the engine. A slipping or disengaged clutch, or a torque converter, would disengage the wheels or absorb braking energy. The braking force varies depending on the engine, and the gear the transmission is in. The lower the gear, the higher the braking effect due to higher rpm and the torque transferred through the transmission (higher torque is delivered from the engine in lower gears).

Engine braking avoids wear on brakes, and can help a driver maintain control of the vehicle. Active use of engine braking by shifting into a lower gear can help control speed while driving down very steep and long slopes, saving the brakes from overheating or excessive wear. If it is applied before the brakes have been used, it can leave the brakes available to make emergency stops. The desired speed is maintained by using engine braking to counteract gravitational acceleration. Potential transmission wear caused by engine braking can be mitigated by certain techniques. Slipping the clutch to complete a downshift wears the clutch plate as it slows the vehicle, doing the job of the brake pads or shoes. A well-executed rev-match in the same setting minimizes stresses on transmission components, so engine braking does the work of slowing the vehicle.

Improper engine braking technique can cause the wheels to skid (also called shift-locking), especially on slippery surfaces, as a result of too much deceleration. As in a skid caused by overbraking, the vehicle will not regain traction until the wheels are allowed to turn more quickly. If the driver reduces engine braking by shifting back up, or disengaging the clutch on a manual transmission, traction can be regained.

In hybrid electric vehicles, like the Toyota Prius, engine braking is simulated by the computer software to match the feel of a traditional automatic transmission. For long downhill runs, the "B" mode acts like a lower gear, using the higher RPM of the internal combustion engine to waste energy, preventing the battery from being overcharged. Almost all electric and hybrid vehicles are able to convert kinetic motion into electricity, i.e. regenerative brakes, but since the internal combustion engine is not used to slow the vehicle when using regenerative braking, it is not the same as engine braking.

== Limitations ==
Engine braking is a generally accepted practice and can help save wear on friction brakes. It is even used in some motor sports to reduce the risk of the friction brakes overheating. Additionally, fuel injection engines generally do not use fuel while engine braking. This is known as deceleration fuel cut-off (DFCO).

Although no longer in production in most countries, there are still carbureted engines in service, with which engine braking is still consuming the fuel. At high engine revolutions and closed throttle valve the high manifold vacuum sucks more fuel through idle bypass than at true idle. The safety aspect of engine braking typically outweighs the minor fuel consumption.

== See also ==
- Dynamic braking, similar effect with electric engines
- Retarder
- Certain types of braking in steam locomotives that are conceptually comparable (using compression in the steam engine cylinders for braking)
  - Countersteam brake
  - Counter-pressure brake
