= Class 52 =

Class 52 may refer to:

- British Rail Class 52
- DRB Class 52, German locomotive class
- DRG Class 52.70, a Saxon Class III steam locomotive
