= Columbus Midrange Engine Plant =

- Operated: 1992–present
- Location: 2725 West 450 South; Columbus, Indiana, United States
- Coordinates: 39.1312°N 85.9475°W
- Industry: Automotive
- Products: engines
- Area: 400 acres (160 ha)
- Volume: 600,000 square feet (56,000 m^{2})
- Owner: Cummins Inc.

Columbus Midrange Engine Plant (CMEP) is a midrange engine manufacturing plant in Columbus, Indiana, owned by Cummins Inc. The plant produces B-Series engines for Ram pickups.

== History ==
Originally designed in the late 1980s for heavy-duty engine components and closed in late 1988, the plant was re-engineered and re-opened in March 1992 to produce the 5.9L 6BT engine used in Dodge Ram trucks following growing demand from the original Consolidated Diesel Company partnership.

In 2002, the plant celebrated its 10th anniversary and was stabilized to employ around 650 people. The next year, Cummins celebrated its 1 millionth engine produced for Dodge at the plant. In October 2006, Cummins and Ram reached the milestone of their 1.5 millionth turbo diesel engine produced at the CMEP, which coincided with the introduction of the 6.7L Turbo Diesel engine.

In June 2008, Cummins planned temporary layoffs affecting about 125 workers at its Walesboro (Columbus) midrange engine plant due to declining demand for pickup truck engines. On May 15, 2009, the plant was temporarily shut down and laid off 690 workers due to the bankruptcy and production halt of its primary customer, Chrysler LLC, with plans to remain idle until Chrysler resumed truck production.. After Chrysler emerged from Chapter 11 bankruptcy, Cummins later began recalling about 400 workers to resume limited production starting July 13, 2009.

== Products ==
- Cummins ISB

== See also ==
- Columbus Engine Plant, the first Cummins engine plant in Columbus, Indiana
