= DFCO =

DFCO may refer to:

- Dijon FCO, Dijon Football Côte d'Or
- Deceleration fuel cut-off, see Engine braking
