= Cummins-Wärtsilä =

Joint venture between Cummins and Wärtsilä

- Type: Joint venture
- Industry: Manufacturing
- Founded: 1995
- Defunct: 2000
- Headquarters: France, United Kingdom
- Products: high-speed diesel engines
- Parent: Cummins (50%); Wärtsilä (50%)

Cummins-Wärtsilä Engine Co. was an Anglo-French joint venture which existed between 1995 and 2000. Jointly owned by Cummins and Wärtsilä, it was a manufacturer of operated diesel engines.

== Background ==
In the 1990s, Cummins was the world's biggest high-speed diesel-engine producer in the category of 200 horsepower and over. Meanwhile, Wärtsilä, was focussed on medium-speed engines. Cummins wanted to extend its selection in the upper range and Wärtsilä in its lower range.

== Establishment ==
Cummins and Wärtsilä Diesel agreed about setting up a joint venture to produce engines which would cover the gap in the engine ranges between both companies. The companies signed a letter of intent for the foundation of Cummins-Wärtsilä in December 1994. The ownership was shared 50% / 50% between Cummins and Wärtsilä. Both Cummins president Tim Solso as well as Wärtsilä chief Pentti-Juhani Hintikka had high expectations about the co-operation. In March 1995, Iain Barrowman, who had served for eight years at Cummins, was appointed president of Cummins-Wärtsilä.

== Scope ==
The joint venture designed, developed and produced two product families of diesel and gas engines for power generation and marine propulsion use. Wärtsilä sold these engines under the Wärtsilä brand, and Cummins under its own name. Initially the sales and services were carried out by both companies separately; these operations were combined in 1997.

- The Wärtsilä 200 family was launched shortly before the joint venture establishment. Its power range was 2,200–4,500 kW and it was produced at the Wärtsilä SACM Diesel factory in Mulhouse, France. Cummins sold this engine type under the name Cummins QSZ.
- Cummins QSW was produced in the Cummins Daventry plant and came into the market in 1997. It had a power range of 550–2,700 kW.

== End of the joint venture ==
According to analytics, Cummins-Wärtsilä failed at introducing new engine types onto the market. The joint venture created significant losses.

In December 1999 Cummins reported about the dissolution of the joint venture. Cummins kept the Daventry factory where it continued producing the Cummins QSW (Wärtsilä 170/180) series, and the Mulhouse factory was transferred back to Wärtsilä NSD together with the production of Wärtsilä 200/220 engines.

In January 2000 Ole Johansson, the president of Wärtsilä, said that both companies would continue the production and development of their own engine families, providing both parties better synergy benefits and improving profitability from the prevailing deficient level.
