= Compression release engine brake =

Mechanism of some diesel engines

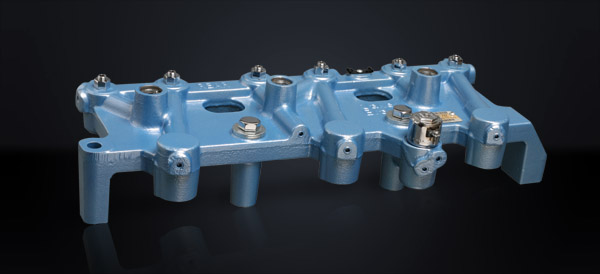
A compression release engine brake from Jacobs Vehicle Systems, popularly known as a "Jake brake"

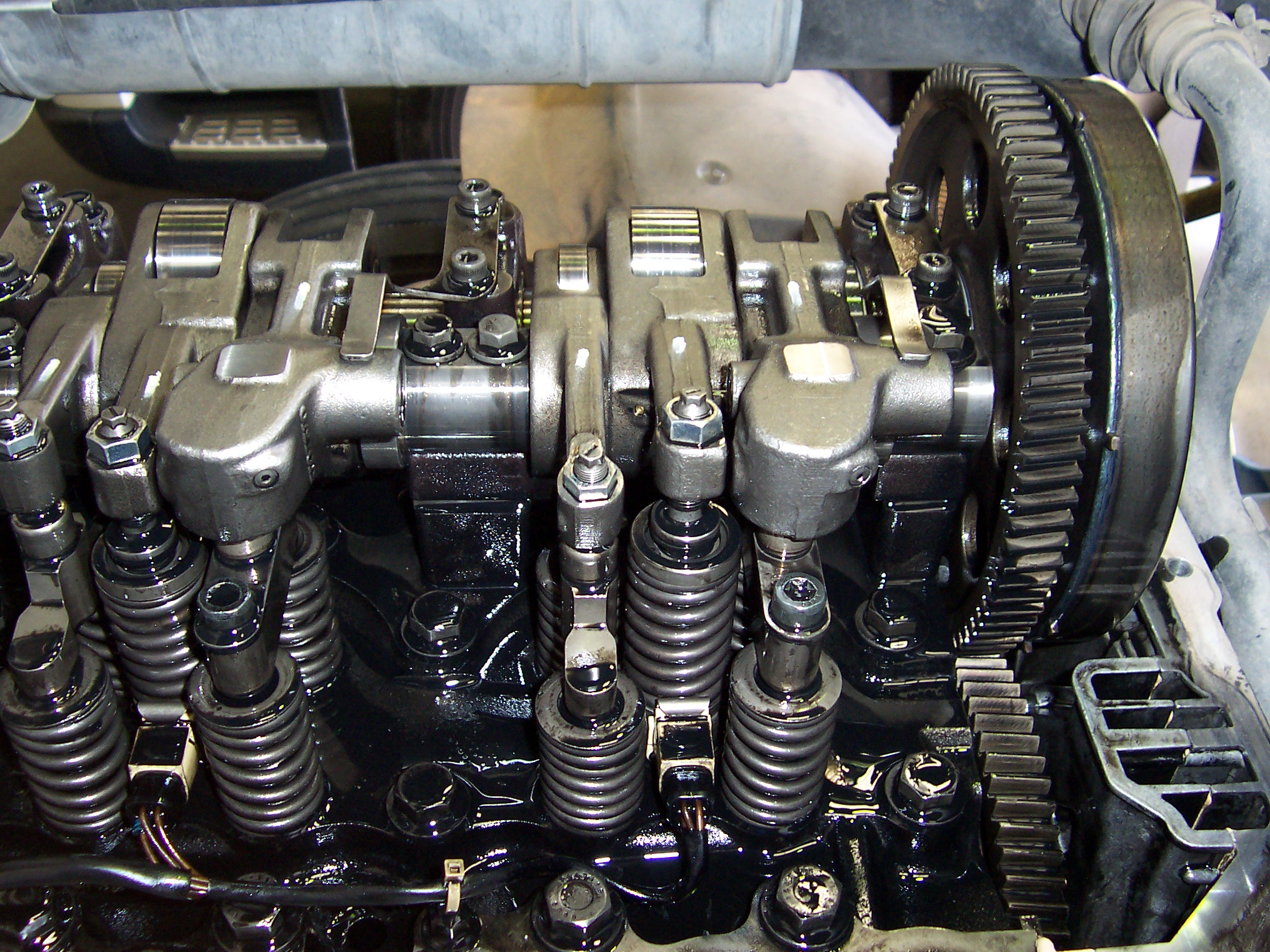
A view of engine compression brake rocker arm (the thickest at the right of each set)

Jacobs Engine Brake Division logo

A compression release engine brake, compression brake, or decompression brake is an engine braking mechanism installed on some diesel engines. When activated, it opens exhaust valves to the cylinders, right before the compression stroke ends, releasing the compressed gas trapped in the cylinders. The compression followed by the "wasteful" release consumes a great amount of energy, effectively slowing the vehicle.

Clessie Cummins was granted U.S. patent 3,220,392 for the engine compression brake in 1965. The first company to manufacture them was Jacobs Vehicle Systems, resulting in the term Jake brake.

== Function ==
When the driver releases the accelerator on a moving vehicle powered by an internal combustion engine, the vehicle's forward momentum continues to turn the engine's crankshaft. Most diesel engines do not have a throttle body, so regardless of the throttle setting, air is always drawn into the cylinders (excluding the valve fitted to certain diesels, such as fire appliances and generators on oil and gas platforms, to prevent diesel engine runaway). The fuel-free air mix that is compressed on the compression stroke then starts to act as an air spring. After the piston reaches maximum compression, the compressed air mixture returns its energy to the piston by pushing the piston back down. The result is that even if the fuel supply to the cylinder is stopped, some energy absorbed during the compression stroke is still returned to the crankshaft. Because of this returned energy, there is very little engine braking applied to the vehicle.

The typical compression brake consists of a hydraulic system using engine oil which transfers the motion of the fuel injector rocker arm to the engine's exhaust valve(s). When activated, the exhaust valve opens very briefly near the piston's top dead center, and releases the compressed air in the cylinder so that the air compression energy is not returned to the crankshaft. A compression release engine brake can assist a vehicle to maintain or even reduce speed with minimal use of friction brakes. The power of this type can be around the same as the engine power.

In contrast, a gasoline engine under deceleration runs with a closed throttle that prevents free flow of air into the cylinders, resulting in little pressure to release at the top of the compression stroke. The closed throttle provides engine braking by forcing the engine to generate a vacuum between the throttle and the cylinders.

Typically, the controls for a compression brake consist of an on/off switch and often a selector that controls the number of cylinders on which the brake is active. Throttle and clutch switches are integral with the system. Activation occurs when both the clutch and the throttle are released with the transmission in gear. It is the driver's job to ascertain the correct transmission gear to use, depending on factors such as the steepness of the grade and the vehicle's load.

== Limitation ==
External videos
- Sound & video of a truck using a compression release engine brake

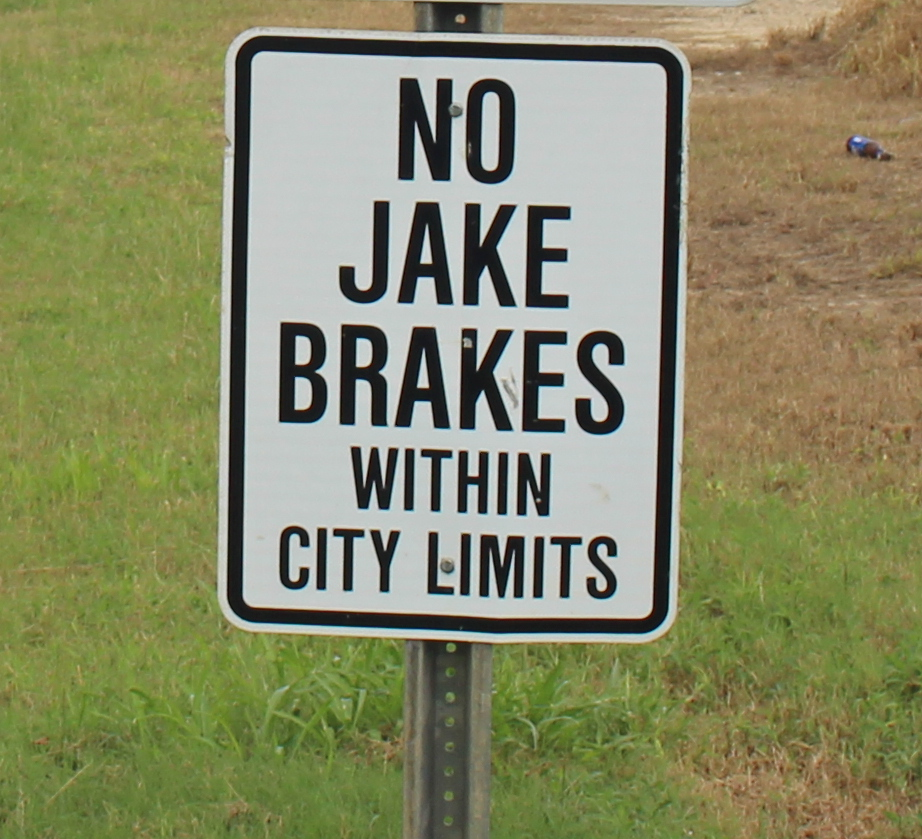
No Jake brakes sign

The use of engine compression brakes may cause a vehicle to make a loud "growling", "machine gun", or "jackhammer"-like exhaust noise, especially with vehicles that don't have mufflers, which has led many communities in the United States, Canada, and Australia to prohibit compression braking within municipal limits. Drivers are notified by roadside signs with text such as "Brake Retarders Prohibited," "No Engine Brake," "No Jake Brakes," "Compression Braking Prohibited," or "Unmuffled Engine Braking Prohibited," and enforcement is typically through traffic fines. Such prohibitions have led to the development of new types of mufflers and turbochargers to better silence engine braking noise.

Jacobs claims that the use of the term "Jake Brake" on signs prohibiting engine retarding brakes violates their trademark and discriminates against Jacobs-brand products.

In the US state of Ohio, state law allows a board of county commissioners or township trustees to prohibit the use of compression brakes within unincorporated areas. These local regulations apply to all state and locally maintained roads except interstate highways. The state's standard "No Engine Brake" sign is designed to avoid discriminating against the Jacobs brand name.

== See also ==
- Compression release
- Exhaust brake
- Retarder (mechanical engineering)
