= Counter-pressure brake =

Dynamic railway brake on steam locomotives that works through driving cylinders

The counter-pressure brake (German: Gegendruckbremse), also named the Riggenbach counter-pressure brake after its inventor, Niklaus Riggenbach, is a dynamic railway brake on steam locomotives that brakes the locomotive using the driving cylinders. In doing so it reduces wear and tear and overheating of the driving wheel tyres and brake blocks and enables a continuously high brake force to be applied. The brake works by using the cylinders as air compressors and converting kinetic energy into heat. Steam is emitted during braking but this does not come from the boiler, it is produced by evaporation of water used to cool the cylinders.

The main part of the system is piping and regulation of atmospheric air drawn into the cylinders, into which cooling water and oil is injected.

== Operation ==
To use the cylinders as pumps necessitates complete reversal of the normal gas flow. Atmospheric air is drawn through the steam exhaust and compressed air ejected through the steam inlet. A separate chimney is provided, usually behind the main chimney, to exhaust the compressed air without increasing flow through the smokebox (which would cause increased draught of the fire).

Water injected into the incoming air evaporates during compression, carrying away much of the heat generated. Oil is also injected into the incoming air to maintain lubrication of the cylinders.

== Use ==
=== Austria and Germany ===
Counter-pressure brakes were found especially on steam engines that worked long inclines and on rack railway locomotives (e.g. on the Vienna Kahlenberg Railway (Kahlenbergbahn), relieving brake blocks and tyres from high levels of wear and tear that they would otherwise be subjected to.

For operation on ramps its availability was indispensable because these dynamic brakes on steam locomotives provided the required third independent set of brakes.

A further area of use was in measurement and testing using braking locomotives to provide continuous load on railway vehicles being tested in normal running. For this niche activity a number of steam locomotives survived in Germany until the middle of the 1970s.

=== Wales ===
Counter-pressure brakes are used on the steam locomotives of the Snowdon Mountain Railway.

=== India ===
It is used on the Nilgiri Mountain Railway X class locomotives

== Countersteam brake ==
The counter-pressure brake should not be confused with the countersteam brake (German:Gegendampfbremse), which is not considered an auxiliary braking system.
