= Daniel Akerson =

Former chairman and CEO of General Motors

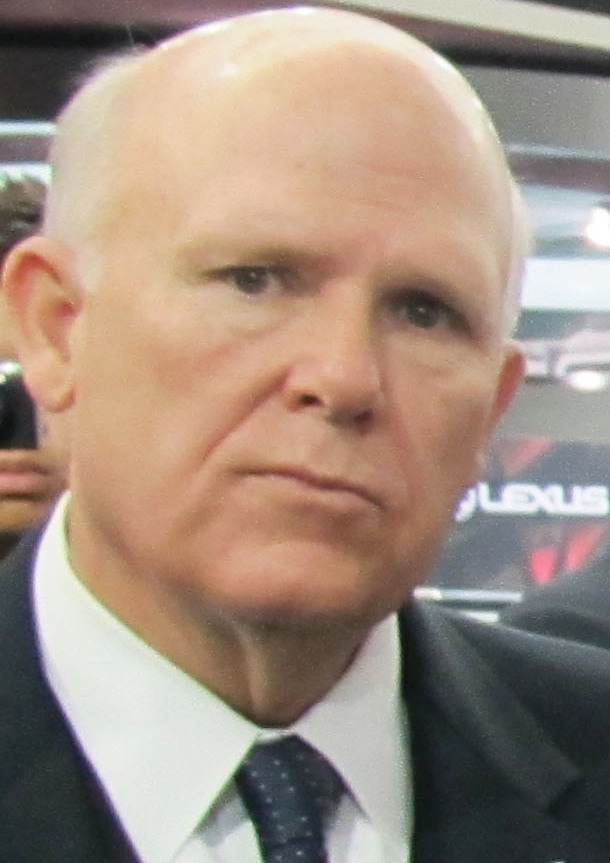
- Akerson in 2012
- Born: Daniel Francis Akerson; October 31, 1948 (age 77); Oakland, California, United States
- Education: U.S. Naval Academy (BS); London School of Economics (MS)
- Occupation: Businessman
- Known for: Former chairman and CEO of General Motors
- Board member of: General Motors, American Express

Daniel Francis Akerson (born October 31, 1948) is the former chairman and CEO of General Motors, serving from 2010 to 2014. Akerson succeeded Edward Whitacre as CEO on September 1, 2010, and became chairman of the board on January 1, 2011. He was succeeded by General Motors CEO Mary Barra. Akerson was a managing director of The Carlyle Group and head of global buyout prior to joining General Motors. He joined the General Motors board of directors on July 24, 2009. Akerson also serves on the boards of American Express and the U.S. Naval Academy Foundation, and in 2014 joined The Carlyle Group as a vice chairman and special advisor to the board of directors.

== Personal life ==
Akerson was born in Oakland, California, grew up in Mankato, Minnesota, and attended Mankato West High School. He currently resides in McLean, Virginia. He holds a Bachelor of Science degree in engineering from the United States Naval Academy (Class of 1970) and a Master of Science degree in economics from the London School of Economics. Akerson served as an officer on a Naval destroyer from 1970-1975.

Akerson's maternal grandparents are German and his paternal grandparents are Swedish.

== Career ==
Akerson joined MCI Inc. in 1983 where he served as the CFO for several years as well as president and chief operating officer. He left MCI in 1993 to become chairman and chief executive of General Instrument, where he succeeded former United States Secretary of Defense Donald Rumsfeld.

In 1996, Akerson was hired to be the chief executive of Nextel. During his tenure as CEO, Nextel's revenues grew from $171.7 million in the year before his arrival to more than $3.3 billion in 1998. Shortly after stepping down as CEO of Nextel in July 1999, Akerson was brought in by Craig McCaw to run Nextlink Communications, later rebranded as XO Communications. XO Communications entered bankruptcy in June 2002, and Akerson resigned as CEO in December 2002. Akerson joined The Carlyle Group in 2003. While at The Carlyle Group, Akerson ran the company's largest private equity fund.

In July 2009, Akerson was named to the board of directors of General Motors as a representative of the U.S. Treasury, which at the time owned a 61% stake in GM. On August 12, 2010, it was announced that Akerson would be the successor of Ed Whitacre as CEO of General Motors, starting September 1, 2010, and would also assume the Chairman of the Board position on January 1, 2011. During Akerson's first year of tenure in 2011, General Motors earned a record $7.6 billion in profit off of $150.3 billion in sales. In December 2013, the U.S. Treasury sold its final remaining shares of GM common stock.

In April 2013, investors began to speculate that the 64-year-old executive may be considering retirement. The speculation was based solely on changes to Akerson's compensation plan at GM.

On December 10, 2013, GM announced that Akerson will be replaced as CEO of GM by Mary Barra, effective January 15, 2014. It is reported that Akerson's retirement was expedited by his wife's advanced stage cancer; however, on March 1, 2014, The Carlyle Group announced that Akerson rejoined the firm as vice chairman and special advisor to the board of directors. As of February 2014, Akerson serves on the board of directors at Lockheed Martin.

== Political opinions ==
In August 2016, Akerson announced that he would—for the first time in his life—not vote for the Republican presidential candidate. In an op-ed piece for The Washington Post, Akerson excoriated Donald Trump on a wide range of issues, while praising Hillary Clinton.

Business positions
Preceded by Edward Whitacre Jr.	CEO of General Motors; September 1, 2010, to January 15, 2014	Succeeded by Mary Barra
Preceded by Edward Whitacre Jr.	Chairman of General Motors; September 1, 2010, to January 15, 2014	Succeeded by Tim Solso
