= Saxon IIIb =

Saxon IIIb DRG Class 52.70 DRG Class 34.77–78
Manufacturers:	Esslingen	Schwartzkopf	Hartmann	Henschel
Quantity:	14; Rebuild from III	32	157	15
Numbers:	274–287; 52 7001	288–319; 34 7701–7702	320–334; 34 7721–7808	335–491
Entered service:	1874	1873–1876	1874–1901	1876
Retired:	by end of the 1920s			
Wheel arrangement:	2-4-0			
Axle arrangement:	1'Bn2			
Service weight:	34.6 t	35.8 t		
Axle load:	11.5 t			
Adhesive weight:	23.1 t	23.8 t		
Length over buffers:	N/K	13,854 mm (45 ft 5 1/2 in) / 13,050 mm (42 ft 9 3/4 in)		
Driving wheel diameter:	1,525 mm (5 ft 0 in)	1,560 mm (5 ft 1 3/8 in)		
Carrying wheel diameter:	990 mm (39 in)	1,035 mm (3 ft 4 3/4 in)		
Top speed:	70 km/h (43 mph)	60 km/h (37 mph) / 70 km/h (43 mph)		
Boiler overpressure:	8.5 bar	10 kg/cm^{2} (981 kPa; 142 psi)		
Piston stroke:	560 mm (22 1/16 in)			
Cylinder bore:	406 mm (16 in)			
Grate area:	1.55 m^{2} (16.7 sq ft)	1.60 m^{2} (17.2 sq ft) / 1.66 m^{2} (17.9 sq ft)		
Evaporative heating area:	90.80 m^{2} (977.4 sq ft)	92.93 m^{2} (1,000.3 sq ft)		
Brakes:	Countersteam brake Westinghouse compressed-air brake			

The Saxon Class III b were German steam locomotives built for the Royal Saxon State Railways (Königlich Sächsische Staatseisenbahnen) in the late 19th century as tender locomotives for express train duties. In 1925, the Deutsche Reichsbahn incorporated the engines into DRG Class 34.77-78.

Between 1873 and 1901, a total of 204 locomotives were delivered to the Royal Saxon State Railways by the firms of Hartmann, Henschel and Schwartzkopff. During the course of their manufacture there were continual modifications. Eighteen were built as compound engines.

The Reichsbahn took over 91 machines and gave them the running numbers 34 7701, 34 7702,
34 7721–34 7808.

== Rebuild of the Saxon Class III ==
Later, 14 engines of the Saxon Class III were equipped with Nowotny steerable axles and also classified as Saxon IIIb locomotives. Of fourteen such engines, only one entered the Deutsche Reichsbahn where it was given the running number 52 7001.

The locomotives equipped with Saxon sä 3 T 7.5 und sä 3 T 9 tenders.

== See also ==
- Royal Saxon State Railways
- List of Saxon locomotives and railbuses
