= Tom Linebarger =

American businessman (born 1963)

- Born: Norman Thomas Linebarger; January 24, 1963 (age 63); Los Altos, California, U.S.
- Education: Claremont McKenna College (BS); Stanford University (BS, MS, MBA)
- Occupations: Former Chairman and CEO of Cummins
- Spouse: Michele
- Children: 2

Norman Thomas Linebarger (born January 24, 1963) is an American businessman, formerly in the diesel engine industry.

== Education ==
Linebarger has joint undergraduate degrees in management engineering from Claremont McKenna College and mechanical engineering from Stanford University. He has an MSc in manufacturing systems from the School of Engineering and an MBA from the Graduate School of Business.

== Career ==
Linebarger began his career as an investment analyst and investment manager at Prudential Financial. He then took an internship at Cummins, joining the company full-time in 1993. During this time he held a variety of roles, including product manager of Fuel Systems Plant, then managing 60-member staff.

From 2012 to 2023, Linebarger served as chairman and chief executive officer of Cummins. Previous positions held at the firm included executive vice president, then president, of Power Generation Business; vice president; chief financial officer; and vice president of Supply Chain Management. He was also one of the "100 CEO leaders in STEM" by STEMblog.

== Boards ==
In 2008, Linebarger joined the Harley Davidson board of directors. He also sits on the Board at the Energy Systems Network. Linebarger is a principal of the American Energy Innovation Council. In 2025, he joined the board of directors of Mainspring Energy.

== Personal life ==
Born in Los Altos, California, Linebarger is married to Michele Linebarger. They have two daughters.
