= Mary Barra =

American businesswoman and executive (born 1961)

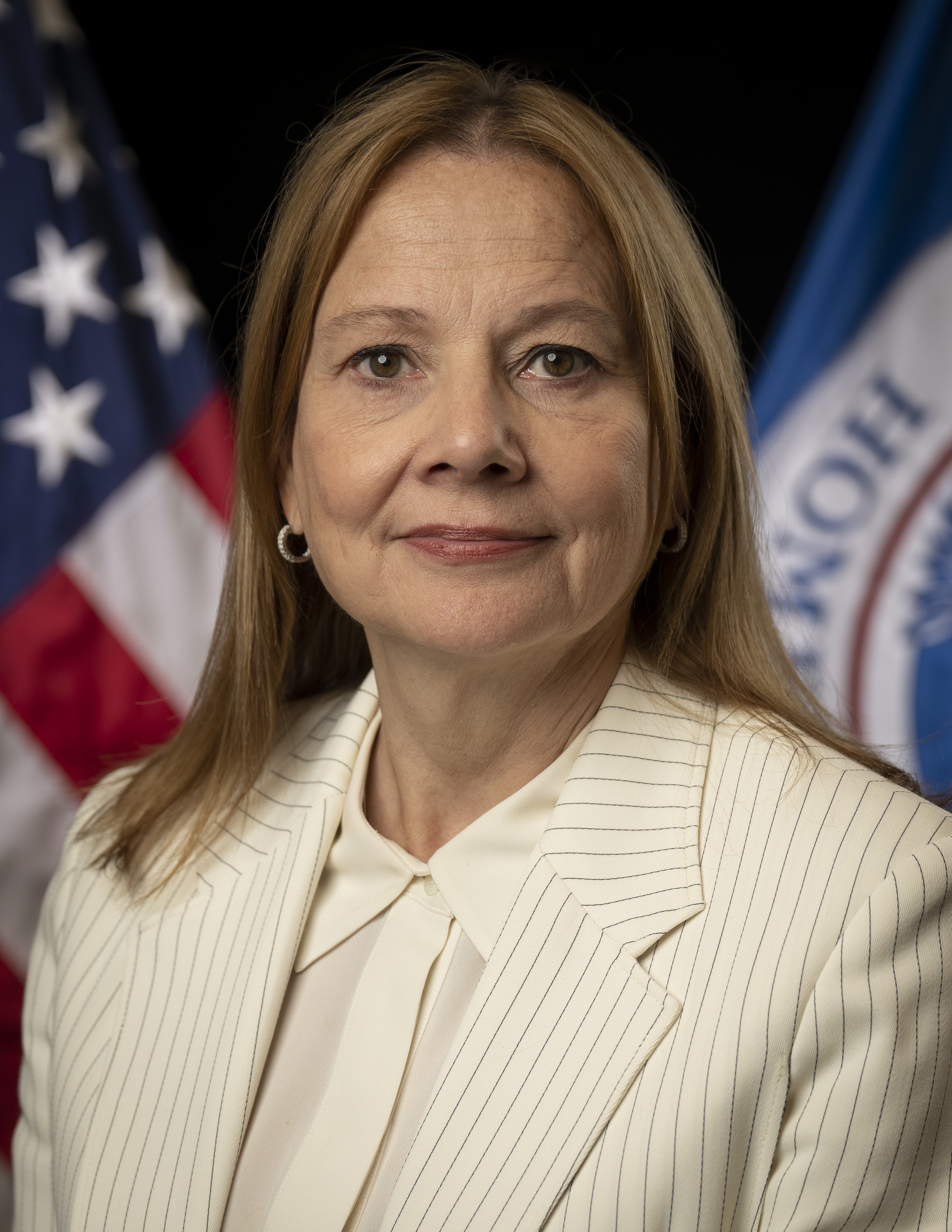
- Official portrait, 2022

Chair of the Board of General Motors
- Incumbent
- Assumed office January 6, 2016
- Preceded by: Tim Solso

CEO of General Motors
- Incumbent
- Assumed office January 14, 2014
- Preceded by: Daniel Akerson

Personal details
- Born: Mary Teresa Mäkelä; December 24, 1961 (age 64) Royal Oak, Michigan, U.S.
- Spouse: Anthony Barra
- Children: 2
- Education: Kettering University (BS); Stanford University (MBA)

Mary Teresa Barra (née Makela; born December 24, 1961) is an American businesswoman who has been the chair and chief executive officer (CEO) of General Motors since January 15, 2014. She is the first female CEO of a 'Big Three' automaker.

In December 2013, GM named her to succeed Daniel Akerson as CEO. Before being named CEO, Barra was executive vice president of global product development, purchasing, and supply chain.

== Early life ==
Barra was born in 1961 in Royal Oak, Michigan, to parents of Finnish descent. Her grandfather, Viktor Mäkelä, moved to the United States and married Maria Saarinen, a Finnish immigrant from Teuva. They lived in Mountain Iron, Minnesota, and had two children, including a son. Reino Päiviö "Ray" Mäkelä (1915–2006) married Eva Elizabeth Pyykkönen (1923–2004) in 1959, and Mary Teresa Mäkelä was their second child. Her father worked for 39 years as a tool and die maker at GM's Pontiac Motor Division. Her mother was a passionate advocate for higher education for both their son, Paul, and daughter.

== Education ==
Barra graduated from the General Motors Institute (now Kettering University) in 1985, where she obtained a Bachelor of Science in Electrical Engineering. Barra was inducted into the engineering honor society Tau Beta Pi (MI Zeta class of 1985) and the honor society IEEE-Eta Kappa Nu (Theta Epsilon chapter 1983) while at Kettering University. She then attended Stanford Graduate School of Business on a GM fellowship, receiving a Master of Business Administration degree in 1990.

== Career ==
=== General Motors ===
Barra started working for General Motors in 1980 as a co-op student when she was 18 years old. Her job was checking fender panels and inspecting hoods, and she used this job to pay for her college tuition. She subsequently held a variety of engineering and administrative positions, including managing the Detroit/Hamtramck Assembly plant.

In February 2008, she became vice president of Global Manufacturing Engineering. In July 2009, she advanced to the position of vice president of Global Human Resources, which she held until February 2011 when she was named executive vice president of Global Product Development. The latter position included responsibilities for design; she worked to reduce the number of automobile platforms in GM. In August 2013, her vice president responsibility was extended to include Global Purchasing and Supply Chain.

When Barra took over as chief executive of General Motors in January 2014, she became the first female head of an automobile manufacturer.

During her first year as CEO, General Motors issued 84 safety recalls involving over 30 million cars. Barra was called before the Senate to testify about the recalls and deaths attributed to the faulty ignition switch. Barra and General Motors also came under suspicion of paying for awards to burnish the CEO and corporation's image during that time. The recalls led to the creation of new policies encouraging workers to report problems they encounter in an attempt to change company culture.

As CEO, Barra directed GM's move into driverless and electric-powered cars through acquisitions including Strobe, a startup in driverless technology.

In 2017, Barra was the highest-paid Detroit Three executive, with a total remuneration of $21.96 million. In November 2018, Barra announced the closure of five North American plants and 14,000 worker layoffs. Her decision was criticized by President Donald Trump, who threatened to remove the company's government subsidies in response.

=== Boards and councils ===
Barra was a General Dynamics board of directors member. She serves on the board of directors of the Detroit Economic Club and Detroit Country Day School. She is a member of the Stanford University Board of Trustees, the Stanford Graduate School of Business Advisory Council, and the Duke University Board of Trustees.

In August 2017, she was elected to the board of Disney. She was the 12th person elected to this board, and the fourth woman.

In March 2022, she was appointed to the Homeland Security Advisory Council by Secretary of Homeland Security Alejandro Mayorkas.

== Awards ==
Barra was honored at the 2023 Arthur W. Page Center Awards where she received a Larry Foster Award for Integrity in Public Communication.

Barra was elected to the National Academy of Engineering in February 2018. In September 2018, Barra was awarded the Yale Chief Executive Leadership Institute's Legend in Leadership Award.

== Personal life ==
Barra is married to consultant Tony Barra, whom she met while studying at Kettering University, and has two children.

Business positions
Preceded by Daniel Akerson	CEO of General Motors; 2014–present	Incumbent
Preceded by Tim Solso	Chairman of the Board of General Motors; 2016–present	Incumbent
