= Tim Solso =

Chairman of General Motors from 2014–2016

- Born: Theodore Matthew Solso; March 5, 1947 (age 79); Spokane, Washington, United States
- Education: DePauw University; Harvard University
- Occupation: Chairman of General Motors
- Board member of: General Motors

Theodore Matthew "Tim" Solso (born March 5, 1947) is an American businessman that served as the chairman of General Motors, from January 15, 2014, to January 4, 2016, where he was succeeded by General Motors CEO Mary Barra. Prior to that, Solso served as the chief executive officer of Cummins from 2000 to 2011.

== Personal life ==
Solso was born in Spokane, Washington to Virgil Edward Solso and Dorothy Jane Burger Solso. Solso graduated from DePauw University in 1969 with a degree in psychology and received an MBA from Harvard University.

Business positions
Preceded by James A. Henderson	CEO of Cummins; 2000 to 2011	Succeeded by Norman Thomas Linebarger
Preceded by Daniel Akerson	Chairman of General Motors; January 15, 2014 to January 4, 2016	Succeeded by Mary Barra
