= Brake force =

Brake force, also known as brake power, is a measure of force applied by the brakes of a vehicle in order to decelerate it. It is one of the main components in determining a vehicle's stopping distance.

== Formula for brake force ==
Brakes convert the kinetic energy of a vehicle into heat over the distance traveled by said vehicle. Thus, we can find the brake force of a vehicle through the formula:

$F_b={mv_i^2\over 2d}$

where:

- $F_b$ is the brake force
- $m$ is the mass of the vehicle
- $v_i$ is the initial velocity of the vehicle when the brakes were applied
- $d$ is the distance traveled by the vehicle between when the brakes were applied until coming to a stop

== Railways ==
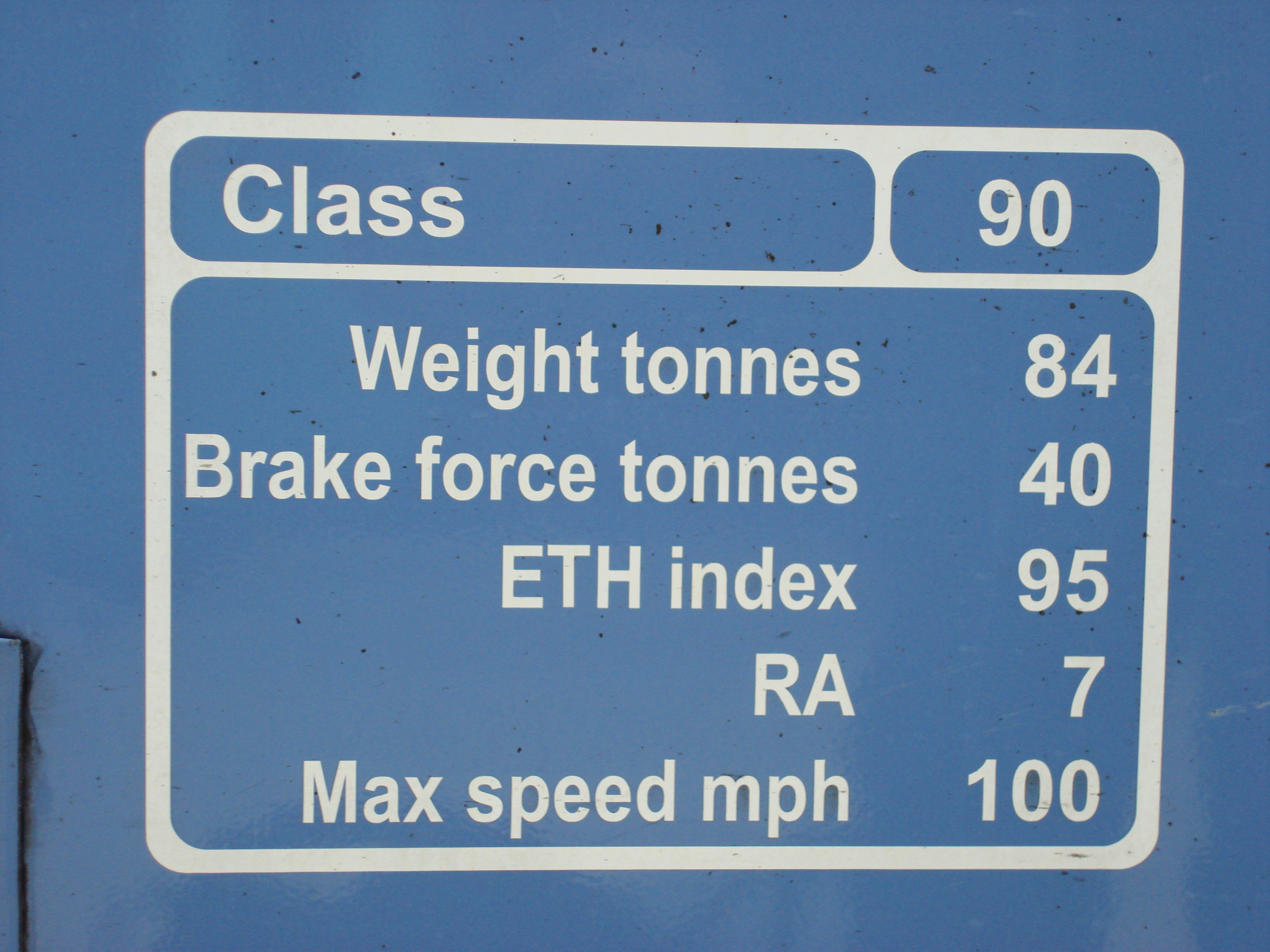
British Railway Class 90 infobox showing brake force

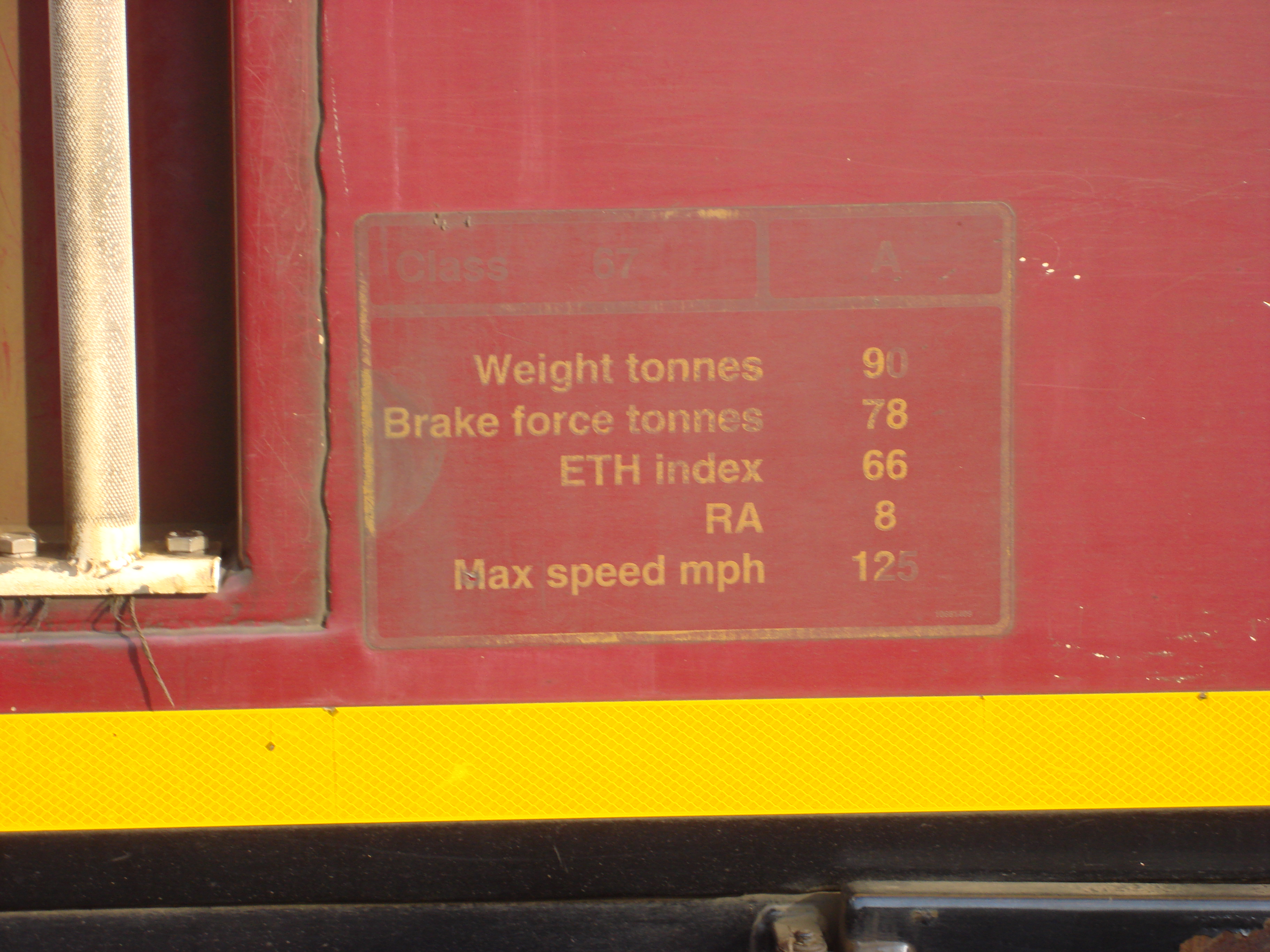
Brake force to weight ratio of the Class 67 is higher than some other locomotives

In the case of railways, it is important that staff are aware of the brake force of a train so sufficient brake power will be available to bring the train to a halt within the required distance from a given speed. In simple terms the brake force of a train should be relative to the sum of the brake force that can be exerted by all the vehicles in the train relative to the weight of the train, excluding problems that may occur such as wheels locking and sliding under braking.

Modern freight wagons typically have brakes that can be operated from the locomotive, these are sometimes referred to as fitted freights. Older wagons typically were not fitted with brakes that could be operated from the locomotive, sometimes these are referred to as unfitted freights. These unfitted freights would typically have brake vans attached to provide additional braking force and operated at a reduced field.

While very early passenger trains might have had brakes that would have been applied by a brakesman riding in say every second carriage modern passenger vehicles have brakes that will be applied to all vehicles.

There are a certain of cases in modern practice where operating at higher at higher speeds can could the brake force above a certain speed would be insufficient to stop the train within the required distance. Some cases arise because the brake force to weight ratio of a locomotive of typically 80 to 120 tonnes in weight is often less than that of passenger vehicle in the 40 tonne range; and it may be that locomotives running by themselves require several coaches to be attached if the train is to run at its maximum permitted speed with a suitable brake force to weight ratio. Another issue that can arise is when a locomotive is hauling a set of coaches, typically a multiple unit, where it is unable to work the brakes of the unit. In this case additional braking vehicles may be attached or the train may need to run at reduced speed.

== See also ==
- Tractive effort
- Continuous tractive effort
- Power at rail
