= Countersteam brake =

A countersteam brake is a brake on a steam locomotive that uses the engine (specifically the cylinders) to help brake the locomotive.

It uses the working principle of steam cylinders fitted with slide or piston valves such that, by changing the configuration of the valve gear, the motion of the valves is also altered such that they work in opposition to the movement of the pistons.

Because of the inertia of a steam locomotive in its initial direction of travel, changing the direction in which the steam cylinders have to work acts first to brake the movement of the connecting rod, which in turn slows the transmission of power to the drive of the locomotive until it stops.

The countersteam brake is often confused with the counterpressure brake, which works with air, not steam, and acts as a dynamic brake. Unlike the countersteam brake, the counterpressure brake is permitted to be used as an independent braking system in its own right.

== Operation ==
The countersteam brake is actually not a brake in the true sense; but simply a way of using the working principle of a steam engine to produce a braking effect. It is therefore not a separate component of a steam locomotive. Countersteam braking is however only achievable with piston valves. On simple slide valves, no opposing steam admission is possible due to the way they are constructed.

Using the countersteam brake, experienced locomotive drivers can reverse the running direction of a steam locomotive almost as if it hasn't been brought to a stop, because the actual changeover point occurs whilst the locomotive is still moving in the initial direction of travel. This technique requires detailed knowledge and experience because if it is not carried out correctly, damage to the locomotive engine may result.

On steam locomotives without a second independent brake system (like e.g. a compressed-air brake, vacuum brake or steam brake) for the engine, in addition to the usual counterweight or fixed brake, the countersteam brake was used as a braking system. Today, steam locomotives generally have to have two independent brake systems in order to be licensed, so that the countersteam brake is not viewed as a braking system, but is nevertheless still used.

== Sources ==
- Heym, Rudolf: Wie funktioniert sie eigentlich, die Dampflok?, Bruckmann, 2004, ISBN 3-7654-7255-7
