= Clessie Cummins =

20th-century American entrepreneur and engineer

Clessie Cummins Sr.
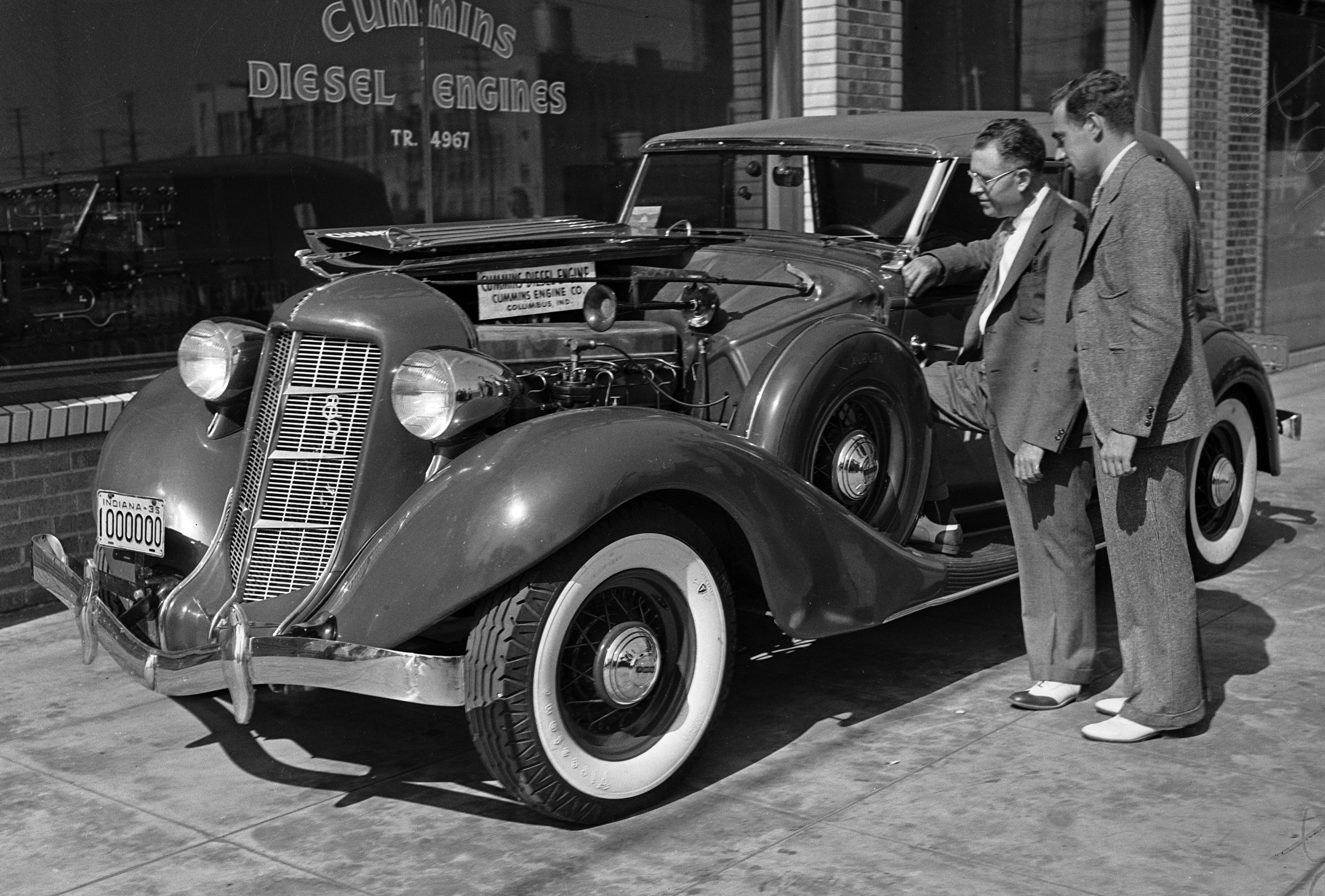
- Cummins (left) showing Fred Duesenberg one of his engines
- Born: December 27, 1888; Columbus, Indiana, United States
- Died: August 17, 1968 (aged 79); California, United States
- Occupations: Mechanic, Inventor, Businessman, Entrepreneur

Clessie Lyle Cummins (December 27, 1888 – August 17, 1968) was the founder of the Cummins Engine Company. He was an entrepreneur who improved on existing diesel engines, created new diesel engine designs, was awarded 33 United States patents for his inventions, and set five world records for endurance and speed for trucks, buses and race cars.

== Early life ==
Clessie Cummins was born on December 27, 1888, in Columbus, Indiana.

He began his career as a farmboy, and had no formal higher education beyond the eighth grade. Although he didn't have any formal education, he learned to build a steam engine at age 11. In the 1910s Cummins went to work for a banker named William Irwin in Columbus, Indiana, as a chauffeur and mechanic.

== Foundation of Cummins Engine Co. ==
In 1919, Clessie Cummins founded the Cummins Engine Company, Inc (now Cummins, Inc) with the assistance of banker William G. Irwin. At the time of its founding, Cummins developed the first engine as licensee of R.M. Hvid Co. This engine was a 6 horsepower (4.5 kW) model designed for use on the farm.

Cummins' former employer, Irwin, invested a great deal of money in Cummins' company. However, Irwin was not satisfied with the company's profits and threatened to cease investing. Sales of diesel engines to farmers through the Sears-Roebuck catalog were not generating significant profits, partially because farmers would purchase and use the engines during the harvest period and then return them to Sears.

Clessie Cummins secured a Packard limousine (a vehicle with a large engine compartment) and fitted one of his best engines into it with 3/8-inch to spare. He and an assistant drove the vehicle to the 1929 auto show in New York City using $1.39 (equal to $26.06 today) worth of diesel fuel. The pair arranged for publicity along the way, but when they arrived at the show they found that they had been banned from any presentation because he had not registered in advance. Cummins proceeded to rent space across the street from the Auto Show, and the "$1.39 for fuel, Indy to NYC" auto became a popular feature of the show (despite not technically being included in it).

During the 1920s, many of the company's engines were used in yachts—a market that vanished during the Great Depression of the 1930s. At that time, his employer and patron, Will Irwin, owned a controlling interest in the Purity Stores supermarket chain, in California. Cummins convinced Irwin to install diesel engines in the fleet of trucks used to deliver food and staples to the stores. The diesel trucks were far better at managing the California mountains than the gasoline engines of that time, and were much more durable and economical to run. The success at Purity Stores attracted considerable attention, and the over-the-road diesel truck industry thus came into being. Thereafter, the growth of Cummins Engine came mainly from supplying high-speed, high-torque engines, which buyers specified for installation in semi-trailer tractors from most of the major manufacturers.

Cummins' times with the engine company continued to be tumultuous even after this success, but money was being made. Cummins' first successful engine design, the Model F (1924), was originally used for marine applications, but came to be used in other applications. In 1931 Cummins entered the Indianapolis 500 with a self-built (3,389 pound, 361 cubic-inch) four cylinder, three-valve, 85 horsepower (63 kW), Model U marine diesel that he installed into a Model A Duesenberg. The Cummins Duesy averaged 86 miles per hour (138 km/h) and completed the race on 1 tank of fuel, without any pit stops.

World War II ensured the success of the fledgling company: the American military bought every diesel engine which could be produced in preparation for an Allied invasion of continental Europe. But it was the post-war sale of truck engines that contributed most to the company's subsequent growth.

In 1955, Cummins had to leave the company he created, retiring from the position of Chairman. He had managed to hold onto some key patents and formed Cummins Enterprises Company later that year. He moved on to work for the Allison Engine Company in California.

Clessie Cummins continued to innovate until his death. He identified the problem of vehicle brakes overheating and becoming non-functional during long, steep downhill descents. As a result, he designed and patented the first compression release engine brake. The design was first offered to Cummins, but Jacobs was ultimately the company with which he partnered. In 1960, the product was sold under the Jake Brake name by Jacobs Vehicle Systems, Inc. As he approached eighty years of age, he designed, built, and ran in his basement shop a new concept engine. In 2022 Jacobs Vehicle Systems was acquired by Cummins Inc. bringing one of Clessie's inventions back to the company he originally founded.

== Death and legacy ==
Cummins died on August 17, 1968. Cummins, Inc. is now a worldwide builder of diesel engines. On February 22, 2007, Clessie Cummins was inducted into the Central Indiana Business Hall of Fame. His son, Clessie Lyle Cummins Junior, has written several books.

== See also ==
- Cummins Inc., formerly Cummins Engine Company
