= History of General Motors =

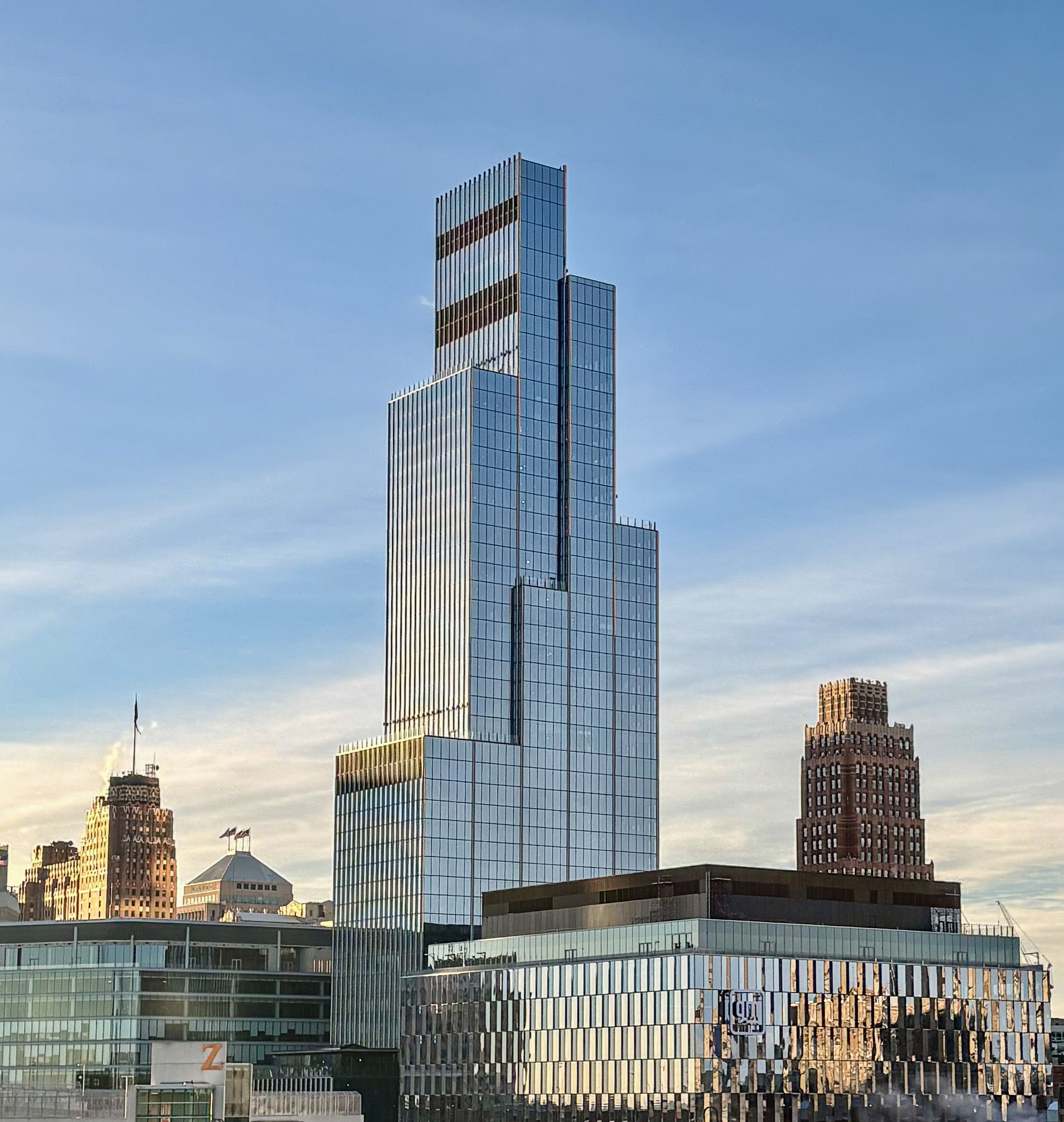
The skyscraper of Hudson's Detroit in Downtown Detroit, Michigan, is the world headquarters of General Motors, since 2026.

The history of General Motors (GM), one of the world's largest car and truck manufacturers, dates back more than a century and involves a vast scope of industrial activity around the world, mostly focused on motorized transportation and the engineering and manufacturing that make it possible. Founded in 1908 as a holding company in Flint, Michigan, as of 2012 it employed approximately 209,000 people around the world. With global headquarters at the Hudson's Detroit in Detroit, Michigan, United States, General Motors manufactures cars and trucks in 35 countries. In 2008, 8.35 million GM cars and trucks were sold globally under various brands. Current auto brands are Buick, Cadillac, Chevrolet, GMC, Baojun, and Wuling. Former GM automotive brands include LaSalle, McLaughlin, Oakland, Oldsmobile, Opel, Pontiac, Hummer, Saab, Saturn, Vauxhall, Daewoo, and Holden.

In addition to brands selling assembled vehicles, GM also has had various automotive-component and non-automotive brands, many of which it divested in the 1980s through 2000s. These have included Euclid and Terex (earthmoving/construction/mining equipment and vehicles), Electro-Motive Diesel (locomotive, marine, and industrial diesel engines), Detroit Diesel (automotive and industrial diesel engines), Allison (aircraft engines, transmissions, gas turbine engines), New Departure (bearings), Delco Electronics and ACDelco (electrical and electronic components), GMAC (finance), General Aviation and North American Aviation (airplanes), Frigidaire (appliances including refrigeration and air conditioning), and Electronic Data Systems (information technology).

== 1907–1929 ==
GM's old headquarters in downtown Detroit, Michigan, built 1919-1923, served for 73 years, from 1923 until 1996, a National Historic Landmark / listed on the National Register of Historic Places, and is now known as Cadillac Place state office building for the state of Michigan.

General Motors was capitalized by William C. Durant on September 16, 1908, as a holding company. The next day it purchased Buick Motor Company, and rapidly acquired more than twenty companies including Oldsmobile, Cadillac, Oakland Motor Car Company, and McLaughlin of Canada. Dr. Campbell, Durant's son-in-law, put 1,000,000 shares on the stock market in Chicago Buick (then controlled by Durant).

Durant's earlier company, the Durant-Dort Carriage Company, had been in business in Flint since 1886, and by 1900 was producing over 100,000 carriages a year in factories located in Michigan and Canada. Prior to his acquisition of Buick, Durant had several Ford dealerships. With springs, axles and other key components being provided to the early automotive industry by Durant-Dort, it can be reasoned that GM actually began with the McLaughlin Carriage gear from 1867 founding of Durant-Dort.

GM under Durant's leadership acquired Olds Motor Works later in 1908. The next year, he brought in Cadillac, Cartercar, Elmore, Ewing, and Oakland. In 1909, General Motors also acquired the Reliance Motor Car Company of Detroit, Michigan, and the Rapid Motor Vehicle Company of Pontiac, Michigan, the predecessors of GMC Truck. A Rapid became the first truck to conquer Pikes Peak in 1909. In 1909, the Corporation produced and sold 25,000 cars. In 1910, Welch and Rainier were added to the ever-growing list of companies controlled by GM.

GM was initially created by combining independent manufacturers who were competing with the Ford Motor Company and vehicles offered before the October 1, 1908 introduction of the Model T (produced for 19 years until 1927). Once the soon iconic Model T began to appear in all corners of America and dominate the automobile market, independent companies began to combine their resources as corporations and decided to offer what the Model T didn't. The Model T was offered by Ford only in the black color, because it dried the fastest as it rolled off the assembly line plus was the cheapest with only one color painting process, so GM offered their products in various color combinations; the Model T came with one four-cylinder engine, so GM offered their vehicles with different wheelbases and engine displacements on a gradual scale based on price.

Founder / president Durant eventually lost control of GM in 1910 to a bankers trust as the deal to buy Ford for $8 million fell through, due to the large amount of debt (around $1 million) that was taken on in its earlier acquisitions, while Samuel McLaughlin left at the same time. Durant was forced out of the firm by the stockholders and then later co-founded the Chevrolet Motor Company in 1911 with Louis Chevrolet. McLaughlin then bought Chevrolet stock in 1912, and by 1915 had built Chevrolet in Canada and after a stock buyback campaign with the McLaughlin and DuPont corporations, and other Chevrolet stock holders, Durant returned to head GM in 1916, as Chevrolet owned 54.5% with the backing of Pierre S. du Pont. On October 13 of the same year, GM Company incorporated as the "General Motors Corporation" after McLaughlin merged his companies and Became the first General Motors Company of Canada Limited sold his Chevrolet stock to allow the incorporation, which in turn followed the incorporation of General Motors of Canada (reverting to General Motors Company upon emergence from bankruptcy in 2009 that left General Motors of Canada Limited as a Wholly-Owned Privet Canadian Company). Chevrolet entered the General Motors fold in 1918 as it became part of and merged into the corporation with R S McLaughlin as Director and vice-president of the corporation; its first GM car was 1918's Chevrolet 490. Du Pont later removed Durant from management in 1920, and various Du Pont interests held large or controlling GM shareholdings until about 1950.

In 1918, GM acquired the Chevrolet stock from McLaughlin Motor Car Company of Oshawa, Ontario, Canada, manufacturer of the McLaughlin automobile since 1907 (later to be renamed McLaughlin-Buick) as well as Canadian versions of Chevrolet cars since 1915. The company was renamed General Motors of Canada Ltd., with R.S. ("Colonel Sam") McLaughlin as its first president and his brother George as vice-president allied with the Corporation 1919. Superior Court of Ontario Canada documents show the corporation as indirect parent of General Motors of Canada Limited. General Motors of Canada is a 100% owned Canadian Company.

1918 also saw personnel increase at GM. The number of employees grew from about 49,000 workers to 85,000 workers. Many came from the South of the United States, as well as from Europe, to work at GM Michigan facilities. To accommodate them, GM began to build employee housing with the nearly $2.5 million set aside for the project. This would become one of General Motors top 5 expenditures for the year 1919. 1919 also brought changes to employee investment opportunities. Similar to modern-day 401(k) plans, all employees could invest a percentage of their wages or salary. GM proceeded to match every penny that their employees invested.

GM's headquarters were located in Flint, Michigan until the mid-1920s, when they were moved to downtown Detroit. Its building, originally to be called the Durant Building, was designed and began construction in 1919 when Durant was still president, was completed four years later in 1923. Alfred P. Sloan became president that year, and the building was officially dedicated it as the General Motors Building in 1929. GM maintained this headquarters location, now called Cadillac Place (used as a state office building by the state of Michigan since 1996) until it purchased the prominent modernist glass-facade skyscraper of the Renaissance Center seven decades later in 1996.

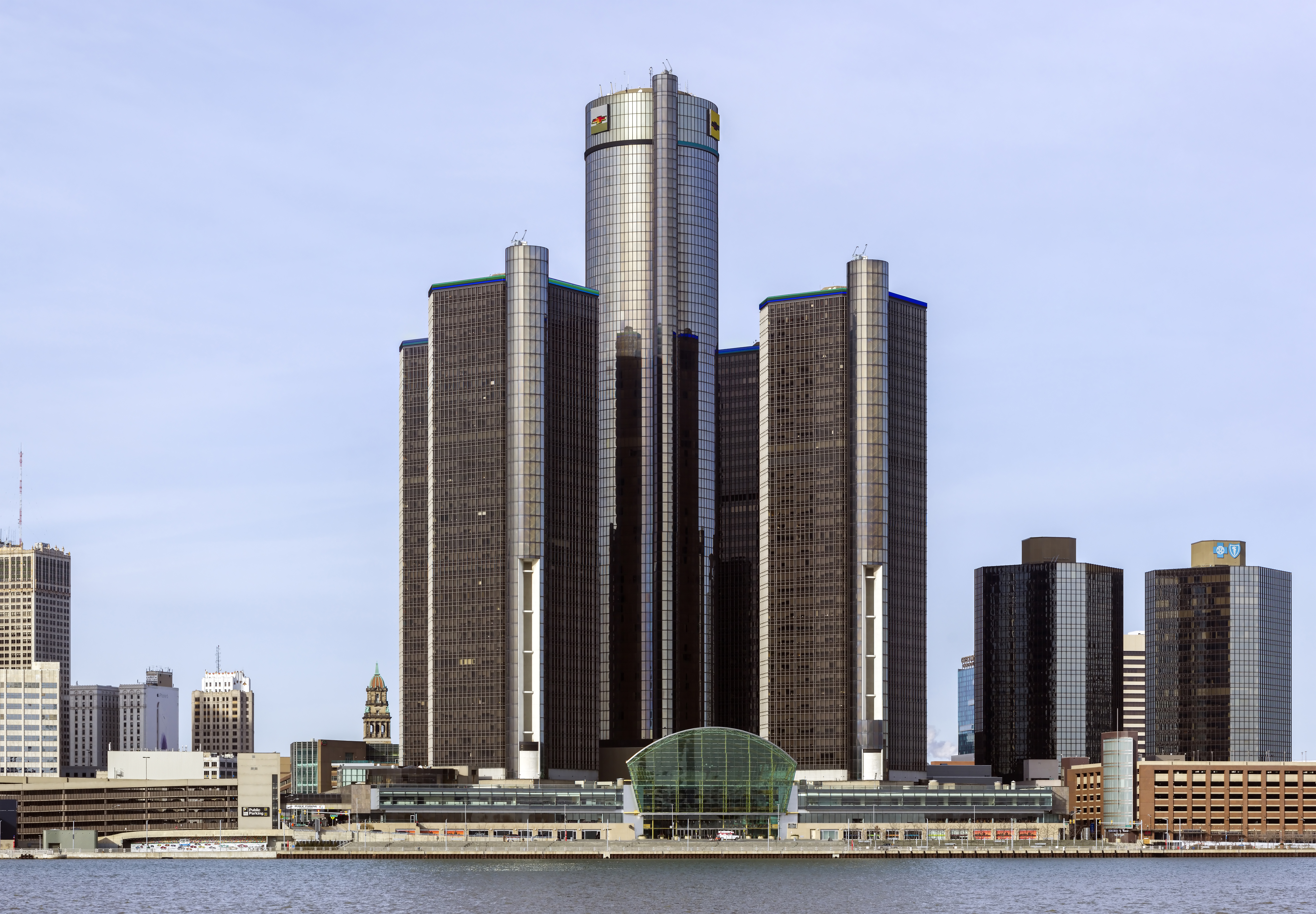
GM's former headquarters the Renaissance Center in downtown Detroit, Michigan, from 1996-2026.

The Buick Division headquarters however remained in Flint until two years later 1998 when it too was relocated to the Renaissance Center. On April 15, 2024, GM announced that it would relocate its global headquarters from the Renaissance Center to the nearby Hudson's Detroit development in 2025. As of January 12, 2026 they have begun official occupancy of the site.

In 1920, Durant oversaw the start-up of the Sheridan line of cars, manufactured (from 1920 to 1921) in Muncie, Indiana. The Sheridan nameplate has the distinction of being the first automotive brand started from scratch by General Motors. When Buick's D. A. Burke approached Durant about the idea of designing a car from the ground up, and then marketing the car as a bridge vehicle between GM's established divisions of Chevrolet and Oakland (a four-cylinder), and between Buick and Cadillac (an eight-cylinder), respectively.

To market the vehicles, Sheridan hired World War I flying ace Eddie Rickenbacker, himself an accomplished automobile racer in his own right. Through prosaic marketing and Rickenbacker's endorsements, Sheridan officials felt the production target of 300 cars a day was not only achievable but profitable as well.

Just as production began to ramp up, Durant was fired for the second and final time from General Motors. Since the Sheridan was a Durant pet project, GM, now under Alfred Sloan, was left with Sheridan, one of Durant's more costly but viable caprices. Durant on the other hand knew that the vehicle was soundly engineered and knew what GM paid for the Muncie facility. In May 1921, Durant purchased the rights to the Sheridan and to the Muncie plant, with the intent on using the facility to continue building the Sheridan and Durant's new project, the Durant and Princeton automobiles, now to be built by Durant Motors.

In 1925, GM bought Vauxhall of England, and then in 1929 went on to acquire an 80% stake in German automobile manufacturer Opel. Two years later this was increased to 100%. In 1931, GM acquired Holden of Australia.

In 1926, GM created the Pontiac as a "companion" to the Oakland brand, an arrangement that lasted five years. The companion outsold its parent during that period, by so much that the Oakland brand was terminated and the division was renamed, Pontiac. As part of General Motors Companion Make Program, three other companion makes (Buick's Marquette, Oldsmobile's Viking, and Cadillac's LaSalle) were created. Each of these, however, had less staying power than Pontiac and was discontinued within a few years, due in large part to the Great Depression.

General Motors acquired control of the 'Hertz Drive-Ur-Self System' (now better known as The Hertz Corporation), the Yellow Cab Manufacturing Company together with its subsidiaries, Yellow Coach Manufacturing Company in 1926 from John D. Hertz who joined the mainboard (John Hertz purchased the car rental business back from GM in 1953 and took it public the following year). GM also acquired the Yellow Coach bus company, and helped create Greyhound bus lines.

During this period (and into the 30s), Sloan and his team established the practice of targeting each of GM's automotive divisions to a specific demographically and socio-economically identifiable market segment. Despite some shared components, each marque distinguished itself from its stablemates with unique styling and technology. The shared components and common corporate management created substantial economies of scale, while the distinctions between the divisions created (in the words of GM President Sloan) a "ladder of success", with an entry-level buyer starting out at the bottom with the "basic transportation" Chevrolet, then rising through Pontiac, Oldsmobile, Buick, and ultimately to Cadillac.

While Ford continued to refine the manufacturing process to reduce cost, Sloan was inventing new ways of managing a complex worldwide organization, while paying special attention to consumer demands. Car buyers no longer wanted the cheapest and most basic model; they wanted style, power, and prestige, which GM offered them. Sloan did not neglect cost, by any means; when it was proposed Chevrolet should introduce safety glass, he opposed it because it threatened profits. Thanks to consumer financing via GMAC (founded 1919), easy monthly payments allowed far more people to buy GM cars than Ford, as Henry Ford was opposed to credit on moral principles (nevertheless, Ford did offer similar credit arrangements with the introduction of the Model A in the late 1920s, but Ford Credit would not exist until 1959).

== 1929–1958 ==
=== The 1930s ===
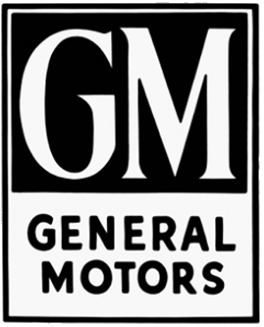
GM logo launched in 1938, used until 1964

In 1930, GM entered aircraft design and manufacturing by buying Fokker Aircraft Corp of America (U.S. subsidiary of Fokker) and Berliner-Joyce Aircraft, merging them into General Aviation Manufacturing Corporation. Through a stock exchange GM took controlling interest in North American Aviation and merged it with its General Aviation division in 1933, but retaining the name North American Aviation. In 1948, GM divested NAA as a public company, never to have a major interest in the aircraft manufacturing industry again. GM did, however, establish their own air transportation, with the creation of the General Motors Air Transport Section (GMATS).

General Motors bought the internal combustion engined railcar builder Electro-Motive Corporation and its engine supplier Winton Engine in 1930, renaming both as the General Motors Electro-Motive Division.

In 1931, after purchasing remaining stake – General Motors took over the full control of Opel, making the company a wholly owned subsidiary, and over the next twenty years, diesel-powered locomotives—the majority built by GM—largely replaced other forms of traction on American railroads. (During World War II, these engines were also important in American submarines and destroyer escorts.) Electro-Motive was sold in early 2005.

In 1932, GM formed a new subsidiary—United Cities Motor Transport (UCMT)—to finance the conversion of streetcar systems to buses in small cities. From 1936 the company was involved in an unpublicized project, with others, in what became known as the General Motors streetcar conspiracy to buy out streetcar and intercity train transport operators using subsidiary companies, and convert their operations to use buses.

In 1935, the United Auto Workers labor union was formed, and in 1936 the UAW organized the Flint Sit-Down Strike, which initially idled two key plants in Flint, but later spread to half-a-dozen other plants including Janesville, Wisconsin and Fort Wayne, Indiana. In Flint, police attempted to enter the plant to arrest strikers, leading to violence; in other cities the plants were shuttered peacefully. The strike was resolved February 11, 1937, when GM recognized the UAW as the exclusive bargaining representative for its workers.

=== World War II ===
General Motors produced vast quantities of armaments, vehicles, and aircraft for the Allied war effort during World War II. Its multinational interests were split up by the combating powers during the war such that the American, Canadian and British parts of the corporation served the Allied war effort and Adam Opel AG served the Axis war effort. By the spring of 1939, the German Government had assumed day-to-day control of American owned factories in Germany, but decided against nationalizing them completely (seizing the assets and capital). Soon after the war broke out, the nationalization came.

General Motors ranked first among United States corporations in the value of wartime production contracts. GM's William S. Knudsen served as head of U.S. wartime production for President Franklin Roosevelt. The General Motors UK division, Vauxhall Motors, manufactured the Churchill tank series for the Allies. The Vauxhall Churchill tanks were instrumental in the UK campaigns in North Africa. Bedford Vehicles and GM of Canada, CMP manufactured 500,000 logistics vehicles for the UK military, all important in the UK's land campaigns. In addition to the obvious manufacture of motor vehicles for the Allied cause, GM was also a major manufacturer of aircraft, setting up the Eastern Aircraft Division with five plants to assemble Grumman-designed aircraft for the allied navies.

By mainstream accounts, General Motors' German subsidiary (Adam Opel AG) was outside the control of the American parent corporation during World War II. Some historians posit that GM profiteered on both sides, but Alfred Sloan's memoir presents a description of lost control. However, GM found criticism for its tax avoidance around the Opel topic. During the war, GM declared it had abandoned its German subsidiary, and took a complete tax write-off worth "approximately $22.7 million", yet after the war, GM collected some $33 million in "war reparations" because the Allies had bombed its German facilities.

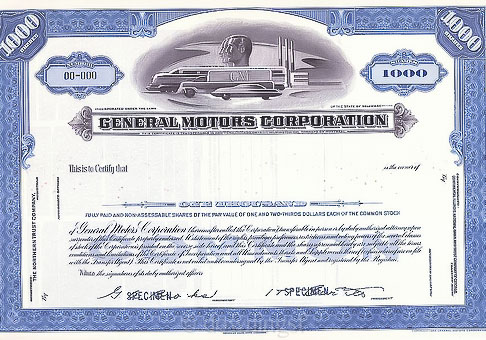
General Motors Corporation specimen stock certificate

=== Post-war growth ===
At one point GM had become the largest corporation registered in the United States, in terms of its revenues as a percent of GDP. In 1953, Charles Erwin Wilson, then GM president, was named by Eisenhower as Secretary of Defense. When he was asked during the hearings before the Senate Armed Services Committee if as secretary of defense he could make a decision adverse to the interests of General Motors, Wilson answered affirmatively but added that he could not conceive of such a situation "because for years I thought what was good for the country was good for General Motors and vice versa". Later this statement was often misquoted, suggesting that Wilson had said simply, "What's good for General Motors is good for the country."

At the time, GM was one of the largest employers in the world—only Soviet state industries employed more people. In 1955, General Motors became the first American corporation to pay taxes of over $1 billion.

GM operated six divisions at this time, one of which (GMC) only sold trucks. The other five settled into a hierarchy, which consisted, from most- to least-prestigious, Cadillac, Buick, Oldsmobile, Pontiac and Chevrolet.

== 1958–1980 ==
The Mark of Excellence, which GM used variations of as its logo between 1964 and 2021.

By 1958, the divisional distinctions within GM began to blur with the availability of high-performance engines in Chevrolets and Pontiacs. The introduction of higher trim models such as the Chevrolet Impala and Pontiac Bonneville priced in line with some Oldsmobile and Buick offerings was also confusing to consumers. By the time Pontiac, Oldsmobile and Buick introduced similarly styled and priced compact models in 1961, the old "step-up" structure between the divisions was nearly over. Earlier in the late 1920s, GM had introduced "junior" brands as a result of the General Motors companion make program as an attempt to bridge the pricing gap between the brands but the overlap and offering eight different brands had a similar confusing effect to consumers and was cancelled by 1930.

The decade of the 1960s saw the creation of compact and intermediate classes. The Chevrolet Corvair was a flat 6-cylinder (air cooled) response to the Volkswagen Beetle, the Chevy II was created to match Ford's conventional Falcon, after sales of the Corvair failed to match its Ford rival, and the Chevrolet Camaro/Pontiac Firebird was GM's countermeasure to the Ford Mustang. Among intermediates, the Oldsmobile Cutlass nameplate became so popular during the 1970s that Oldsmobile applied the Cutlass name to most of its products in the 1980s. By the mid-1960s, most of GM's vehicles were built on a few common platforms and in the 1970s GM began to further unify body panel stampings.

The 1971 Chevrolet Vega was GM's launch into the new subcompact class to compete against the import's increasing market share. Problems associated with its innovative aluminum engine led to the model's discontinuation after seven model years in 1977. During the late 1970s, GM would initiate a wave of downsizing starting with the Chevrolet Caprice which was reborn into what was the size of the Chevrolet Chevelle, the Malibu would be the size of the Nova, and the Nova was replaced by the troubled front-wheel drive Chevrolet Citation. In 1976, Chevrolet came out with the rear-wheel drive sub compact Chevette.

In 1974, GM was the first major automobile company to offer airbags as optional equipment in a non-experimental, unlimited vehicle capacity. Called the "Air Cushion Restraint System", the safety feature was optional on specific full-size Cadillac, Buick, and Oldsmobile vehicles. The occupant safety system proved an unpopular option and was discontinued after the 1976 model year not to return until the 1990s when federal mandates made the system a requirement.

While GM maintained its world leadership in revenue and market share throughout the 1960s to 1980s, it was product controversy that plagued the company in this period. It seemed that, in every decade, a major mass-production product line was launched with defects of one type or another showing up early in their life cycle. And, in each case, improvements were eventually made to mitigate the problems, but the resulting improved product ended up failing in the marketplace as its negative reputation overshadowed its ultimate excellence.

The first of these fiascos was the Chevrolet Corvair in the 1960s. Introduced in 1959 as a 1960 model, it was initially very popular. But before long its quirky handling eventually earned it the reputation for being unsafe, inspiring consumer advocate Ralph Nader to lambaste it in his book, Unsafe at Any Speed, published in 1965. Coincidentally, by the same (1965) model year, suspension modifications and other improvements had already transformed the car into a perfectly acceptable vehicle, but its reputation had been sufficiently sullied in the public's perception that its sales declined over the next few years, and it was discontinued after the 1969 model year. During this period, it was also somewhat overwhelmed by the success of the Ford Mustang.

The 1970s was the decade of the Vega. Launched as a 1971 model, it also began life as a very popular car in the marketplace. But within a few years, quality problems, exacerbated by labor unrest at its main production source in Lordstown, Ohio, gave the car a bad name. By 1977, its decline resulted in termination of the model name, while its siblings along with a Monza version and a move of production to Ste-Thérèse, Quebec, resulted in a thoroughly desirable vehicle and extended its life to the 1980 model year.

Oldsmobile sales soared in the 1970s and 1980s (for an all-time high of 1,066,122 in 1985) based on popular designs, positive reviews from critics and the perceived quality and reliability of the Rocket V8 engine, with the Cutlass series becoming North America's top selling car by 1976. By this time, Olds had displaced Pontiac and Plymouth as the #3 best-selling brand in the U.S. behind Chevrolet and Ford. In the early 1980s, model-year production topped one million units on several occasions, something only Chevrolet and Ford had achieved. The soaring popularity of Oldsmobile vehicles resulted in a major issue in 1977, as demand exceeded production capacity for the Oldsmobile V8, and as a result Oldsmobile quietly began equipping some full size Delta 88 models and the very popular Cutlass/Cutlass Supreme with the Chevrolet 350 engine instead (each division of GM produced its own 350 V8 engine). Many customers were loyal Oldsmobile buyers who specifically wanted the Rocket V8, and did not discover that their vehicle had the Chevrolet engine until they performed maintenance and discovered that purchased parts did not fit. This led to a class-action lawsuit which became a public relations nightmare for GM. Following this debacle, disclaimers stating that "Oldsmobiles are equipped with engines produced by various GM divisions" were tacked onto advertisements and sales literature; all other GM divisions followed suit. In addition, GM quickly stopped associating engines with particular divisions, and to this day all GM engines are produced by "GM Powertrain" (GMPT) and are called GM "Corporate" engines instead of GM "Division" engines. Although it was the popularity of the Oldsmobile division vehicles that prompted this change, declining sales of V8 engines would have made this change inevitable as all but the Chevrolet (and, later, Cadillac's Northstar) versions were eventually dropped.

In the 1980 model year, a full line of automobiles on the X-body platform, anchored by the Chevrolet Citation, was launched. Again, these cars were all quite popular in their respective segments for the first couple of years, but brake problems, and other defects, ended up giving them, known to the public as "X-Cars", such a bad reputation that the 1985 model year was their last. The J-body cars, namely the Chevrolet Cavalier and Pontiac Sunbird, took their place, starting with the 1982 model year. Quality was better, but still not exemplary, although good enough to survive through three generations to the 2005 model year. They were produced in a much-improved Lordstown Assembly plant, as were their replacements, the Chevrolet Cobalt and Pontiac Pursuit/G5.

== 1980–present ==
Roger B. Smith served as CEO throughout the 1980s. GM profits struggled from 1981 to 1983 following the late 1970s and early 1980s recession. In 1981, the UAW negotiated some concessions with the company in order to bridge the recession. GM profits rebounded during the 1980s. During the 1980s, GM had downsized its product line and invested heavily in automated manufacturing. It also created the Saturn brand to produce small cars. GM's customers still wanted larger vehicles and began to purchase greater numbers of SUVs. Roger Smith's reorganization of the company had been criticized for its consolidation of company divisions and its effect on the uniqueness of GM's brands and models. His attempts to streamline costs were not always popular with GM's customer base. In addition to forming Saturn, Smith also negotiated joint ventures with two Japanese companies (NUMMI in California with Toyota, and CAMI with Suzuki in Canada). Each of these agreements provided opportunities for the respective companies to experience different approaches.

The 1980s also marked the dismantling of General Motors' medium and heavy trucks, with imported Isuzu trucks taking over at the lighter end and with the heavy-duty business being gradually sold off to Volvo through a joint venture.

The decade of the 1990s began with an economic recession, taking its inevitable toll on the automotive industry, and throwing GM into some of its worst losses. As a result, "Jack" Smith (not related to Roger) became burdened with the task of overseeing a radical restructuring of General Motors. Sharing Roger's understanding of the need for serious change, Jack undertook many major revisions. Reorganizing the management structure to dismantle the legacy of Alfred P. Sloan, instituting deep cost-cutting and introducing significantly improved vehicles were the key approaches. These moves were met with much less resistance within GM than had Roger's similar initiatives as GM management ranks were stinging from their recent near-bankruptcy experience and were much more willing to accept the prospect of radical change.

Following the first Persian Gulf War and a recession GM's profits again suffered from 1991 to 1993. For the remainder of the decade the company's profits rebounded and it made market share gains with the popularity of its SUVs and pick-up truck lines. Rick Wagoner had served as the company's Chief Financial Officer during this period in the early 1990s. GM's foreign rivals gained market share especially following U.S. recessionary periods while the company recovered. U.S. trade policy and foreign trade barriers became a point of contention for GM and other U.S. automakers who had complained that they were not given equal access to foreign markets. Trade issues had prompted the Reagan administration to seek import quotas on some foreign carmakers. Later, the Clinton administration engaged in trade negotiations to open foreign markets to U.S. automakers with the Clinton administration threatening trade sanctions in efforts to level the playing field for U.S. automakers.

José Ignacio López de Arriortúa, who worked under Jack Smith in both Europe (particularly the successful turnaround of Opel) and the United States, was poached by Volkswagen in 1993, just hours before Smith announced that López would be promoted to head of GM's North American operations. He was nicknamed Super López for his prowess in cutting costs and streamlining production at GM, although critics said that his tactics angered longtime suppliers. GM accused López of poaching staff and misappropriating trade secrets, in particular taking documents of future Opel vehicles, when he accepted a position with VW. German investigators began a probe of López and VW after prosecutors linked López to a cache of secret GM documents discovered by investigators in the apartment of two of López's VW associates. G.M. then filed suit in a United States District Court in Detroit, using part of the Racketeer Influenced and Corrupt Organizations Act, which left VW open to triple damages (billions of dollars) if the charges were proved in court. VW, faced with a plummeting stock price, eventually forced López to resign. GM and Volkswagen since reached a civil settlement, in which Volkswagen agreed to pay GM $100 million and to buy $1 billion worth of parts from GM.

After GM's lay-offs in Flint, Michigan, a strike began at the General Motors parts factory in Flint on June 5, 1998, which quickly spread to five other assembly plants and lasted seven weeks. Because of the significant role GM plays in the United States, the strikes and temporary idling of many plants noticeably showed in national economic indicators.

In the early 1990s, following the first Gulf War and a recession, GM had taken on more debt. By the late 1990s, GM had regained market share; its stock had soared to over $80 a share by 2000, peaking at $93.63 a share on April 28 and $50 billion capitalization. However, in 2001, the stock market drop following the September 11, 2001 attacks, combined with historic pension underfunding, caused a severe pension and benefit fund crisis at GM and many other American companies and the value of their pension funds plummeted.

=== Production of SUVs and trucks vs. cars ===
In the late 1990s, the U.S. economy was on the rise and GM and Ford gained market share producing enormous profits primarily from the sale of light trucks and sport-utility vehicles.

In 2001, following the September 11th attacks, a severe stock market decline caused a pension and benefit fund underfunding crisis. GM began its Keep America Rolling campaign, which boosted sales, and other auto makers were forced to follow suit. The U.S. automakers saw sales increase to leverage costs as gross margins deteriorated.

In 2004, GM redirected resources from the development of new sedans to an accelerated refurbishment of their light trucks and SUVs for introduction as 2007 models in early 2006. Shortly after this decision, fuel prices increased by over 50% and this in turn affected both the trade-in value of used vehicles and the perceived desirability of new offerings in these market segments. The current marketing plan is to tout these revised vehicles extensively as offering the best fuel economy in their class (of vehicle). GM claims its hybrid trucks will have fuel economy improvements of 25%.

=== Corporate restructuring and operating losses ===
After gaining market share in the late 1990s and making enormous profits, General Motors stock soared to over $80 a share. From June 1999 to September 2000, the Federal Reserve, in a move to quell potential inflationary pressures created by, among other things, the stock market, made successive interest rate increases, credited in part for putting the country into a recession. The recession and the volatile stock market created a pension and benefit fund crisis at General Motors and many other American companies. General Motors' rising retiree health care costs and Other Post Employment Benefit (OPEB) fund deficit prompted the company to enact a broad restructuring plan. Although GM had already taken action to fully fund its pension plan, its OPEB fund became an issue for its corporate bond ratings. GM had expressed its disagreement with the bond ratings; moreover, GM's benefit funds were performing at higher than expected rates of return. In 2003, GM responded to the crisis by fully funding its pension fund with a $15 B payment; however, its Other Post Employment Benefits Fund (OPEB) became a serious issue resulting in downgrades to its bond rating in 2005. Then, following a $10.6 billion loss in 2005, GM acted quickly to implement its restructuring plan.

GM began its Keep America Rolling campaign, which boosted sales, and other automakers were forced to follow suit. The U.S. automakers saw sales increase to leverage costs as gross margins deteriorated. For the first quarter of 2006, GM earned $400 million, signaling that a turnaround had already begun even though many aspects of the restructuring plan had not yet taken effect. Although retiree health care costs remain a significant issue, General Motors' investment strategy has generated a $17.1 billion surplus in 2007 in its $101 billion U.S. pension fund portfolio, a $35 billion reversal from its $17.8 billion of underfunding.

In February 2005, GM successfully bought itself out of a put option with Fiat for US$2 billion (€1.55 billion). In 2000, GM had sold a 6% stake to Fiat in return for a 20% share in the automotive business of the Italian conglomerate. As part of the deal, GM granted Fiat a put option, which, if the option had been exercised between January 2004 and July 2009, could have forced GM to buy Fiat's auto unit. GM had agreed to the put option at the time, perhaps to keep it from being acquired by another automaker, such as DaimlerChrysler, competing with GM's German subsidiary Opel. The relationship suffered and Fiat had failed to improve. In 2003, Fiat recapitalized, reducing GM's stake to 10%.

In 2006, GM had begun to apply the Mark of Excellence, which was actually the GM logo. GM had stopped putting their logo on the cars in 2009, but GM did apply the GM logo on some of the early 2010 GM models.

In February 2006, GM slashed its annual dividend from $2.00 to $1.00 per share. The reduction saved $565 million a year. In March 2006, GM divested 92.36 million shares (reducing its stake from 20% to 3%) of Japanese manufacturer Suzuki, in order to raise $2.3 billion. GM originally invested in Suzuki in the early 1980s.

On March 23, 2006, a private equity consortium including Kohlberg Kravis Roberts, Goldman Sachs, and Five Mile Capital purchased 78% of GMAC's (now Ally Financial) commercial mortgage arm, then called Capmark, for $8.8 billion.

On April 3, 2006, GM announced that it would sell 51% of GMAC (now Ally Financial) as a whole to a consortium led by Cerberus Capital Management, raising $14 billion over three years. Investors also included Citigroup's private equity arm and Aozora Bank of Japan. The group will pay GM $7.4 billion in cash at closing. GM will retain approximately $20 billion in automobile financing worth an estimated $4 billion over three years.

GM sold its remaining 8% stake in Isuzu, which had peaked at 49% just a few years earlier, on April 11, 2006, to raise an additional $300 million. 12,600 workers from Delphi, a key supplier to GM, agreed to buyouts and an early retirement plan offered by GM in order to avoid a strike, after a judge agreed to cancel Delphi's union contracts. 5,000 Delphi workers were allowed to flow to GM.

In 2006, GM offered buyouts to hourly workers to reduce future liability; over 35,000 workers responded to the offer, well exceeding the company's goal. GM gained higher rates of return on its benefit funds as a part of the solution. Stock value began to rebound—as of October 30, 2006, GM's market capitalization was about $19.19 billion. GM stock began the year 2006 at $19 a share, near its lowest level since 1982, as many on Wall Street figured the ailing automaker was bound for bankruptcy court. But GM remained afloat and the company's stock in the Dow Jones industrial average posted the biggest percentage gain in 2006.

In June 2007, GM sold its military and commercial subsidiary, Allison Transmission, for $5.6 billion. Having sold off the majority, it will, however, keep its heavy-duty transmissions for its trucks marketed as the Allison 1000 series.

During negotiations for the renewal of its industry labor contracts in 2007, the United Auto Workers (UAW) union selected General Motors as the "lead company" or "strike target" for pattern bargaining. Late in September, sensing an impending impasse in the talks, the union called a strike, the first nationwide walkout since 1970 (individual plants had experienced local labor disruptions in the interim). Within two days, however, a tentative agreement was achieved and the strike ended.

On June 28, 2007, GM agreed to sell its Allison Transmission division to private equity firms Carlyle Group and Onex for $5.1 billion. The deal will increase GM's liquidity and echoes previous moves to shift its focus towards its core automotive business. The two firms will control seven factories around Indianapolis but GM will retain management of a factory in Baltimore. Former Allison Transmission president Lawrence E. Dewey will be the new CEO of the standalone company.

Kirk Kerkorian once owned 9.9 percent of GM. According to press accounts from June 30, 2006, Kerkorian suggested that Renault acquire a 20 percent stake in GM to rescue GM from itself. A letter from Tracinda (Kerkorian's investment vehicle) to Rick Wagoner was released to the public to pressure GM's executive hierarchy, but talks failed. On November 22, 2006, Kerkorian sold 14 million shares of his GM stake (it is speculated that this action was due to GM's rejection of Renault and Nissan's bids for stakes in the company as both of these bids were strongly supported by Kerkorian); the sale resulted in GM's share price falling 4.1% from its 20 November price, although it remained above $30/share. The sale lowered Kerkorian's holding to around 7% of GM. On November 30, 2006, Tracinda said it had agreed to sell another 14 million shares of GM, cutting Kerkorian's stake to half of what it had been earlier that year. By the end of November 2006, he had sold substantially all of his remaining GM shares. After Kerkorian sold, GM lost more than 90% of its value, falling as low as $1/share by May 2009.

On February 12, 2008, GM announced its operating loss was $2 billion (with a GAAP loss of $39 billion including a one time accounting charge). GM offered buyouts to all its UAW members.

On March 24, 2008, GM reported a cash position of $24 billion, or $6 billion less than what was on hand September 31, 2007, which is a loss of $1 billion a month. A further quarterly loss of $15.5 billion, the third-biggest in the company's history, was announced on August 1, 2008.

On November 17, 2008, GM announced it would sell its stake in Suzuki Motor Corp. (3.02%) for 22.37 billion yen ($230 million) in order to raise much needed cash to get through the 2008 economic crisis.

In 2008, 8.35 million GM cars and trucks were sold globally under the brands Vauxhall, Buick, Cadillac, Chevrolet, GMC, Daewoo, Holden, Pontiac, Hummer, Saab, Saturn, Wuling, and Opel.

=== Great Recession and Chapter 11 reorganization ===
In late 2008 GM, along with Chrysler, received loans from the American, Canadian, and Ontarian governments to bridge the late-2000s recession, record oil prices, and a severe global automotive sales decline (see also automotive industry crisis of 2008–2009) due to the 2008 financial crisis. On February 20, 2009, GM's Saab division filed for reorganization in a Swedish court after being denied loans from the Swedish government.

On April 27, 2009, GM announced that it would phase out the Pontiac brand by the end of 2010 and focus on four core brands in North America: Chevrolet, Cadillac, Buick, and GMC. It announced that the resolution (sale) of its Hummer, Saab, and Saturn brands would take place by the end of 2009 (by November, however, proposed deals to sell Saturn to Penske and Saab to Koenigsegg had failed to materialize). The company had closed its Oldsmobile division in 2004.

In 2009, GM renamed itself as General Motors Company, creating its former appellation: General Motors Corporation.

On May 30, 2009, it was announced that a deal had been reached to transfer GM's Opel assets to a separate company, majority-owned by a consortium led by Sberbank of Russia (35%), Magna International (20%), and Opel employees (10%). GM was expected to keep a 35% minority stake in the new company. However, GM delayed acceptance of the deal pending other bids, notably a proposed 51% stake by Beijing Automotive. By early July, a decision had not been made, but Magna remained confident and scheduled a meeting for July 14 to announce its acceptance. After months of deliberation, however, GM decided on November 3, 2009, to retain full ownership of the German carmaker Opel, thus voiding the tentative deal with the Magna consortium.

In June 2010, the company established General Motors Ventures, a subsidiary designed to help the company identify and develop new technologies in the automotive and transportation sectors.

In 2012, PSA Peugeot Citroën and General Motors formed an alliance, which involved General Motors acquiring seven percent of the PSA Group. The ownership was soon divested on December 13, 2013, generating "gross proceeds of €0.25 billion". By 2017, Groupe PSA considered taking over Opel from GM, after GM reported a loss of $257 million from its European operations in 2016, the sixteenth consecutive loss-making year for GM in Europe, bringing its total losses in Europe since 2000 to more than US$15 billion. On March 6, 2017, the sale of Opel and Vauxhall to the PSA Group for $2.3 billion was confirmed.

=== Post-reorganization ===
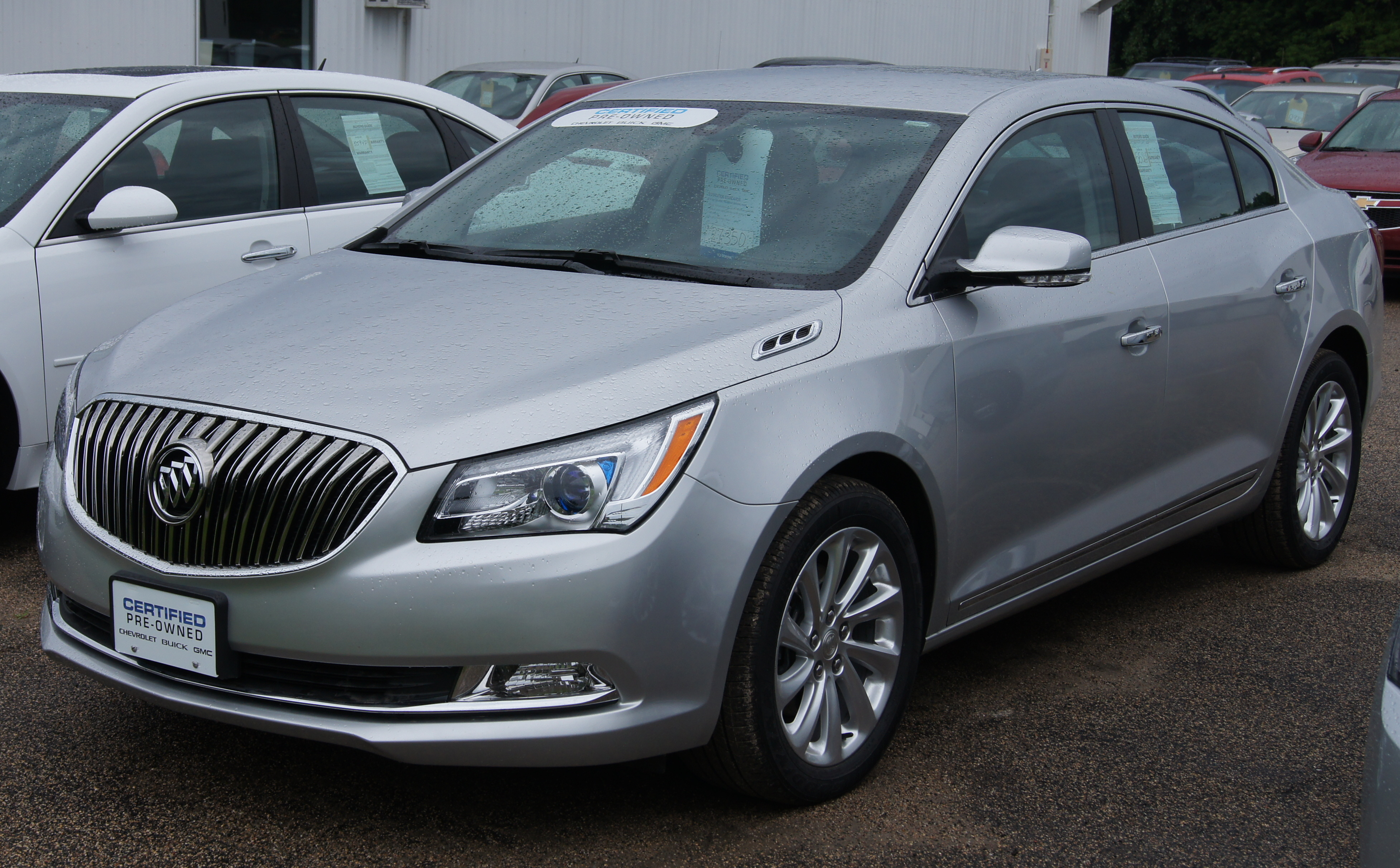
2nd generation Buick LaCrosse (2010–2016)

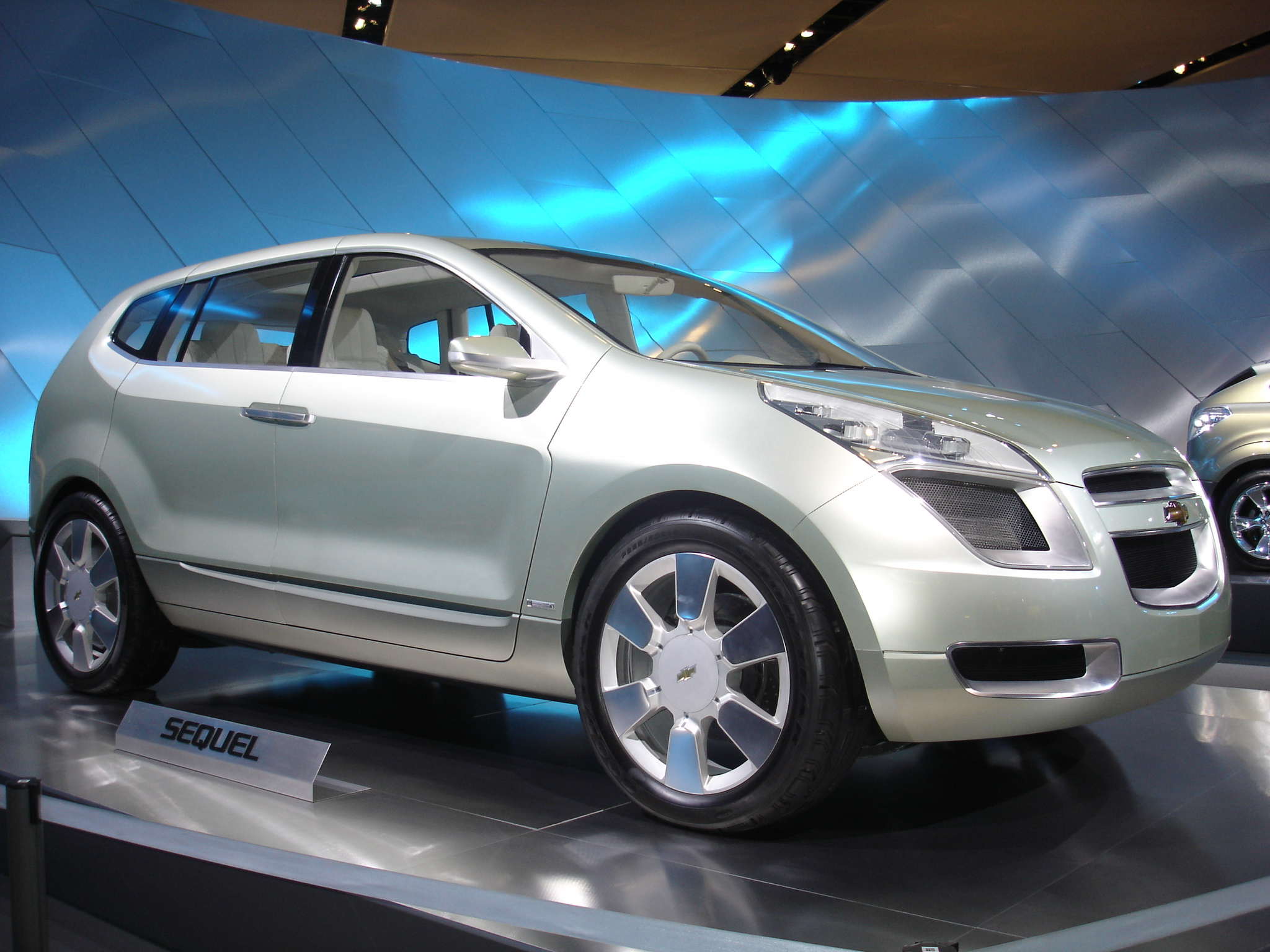
General Motors Sequel, a fuel cell-powered vehicle from GM.

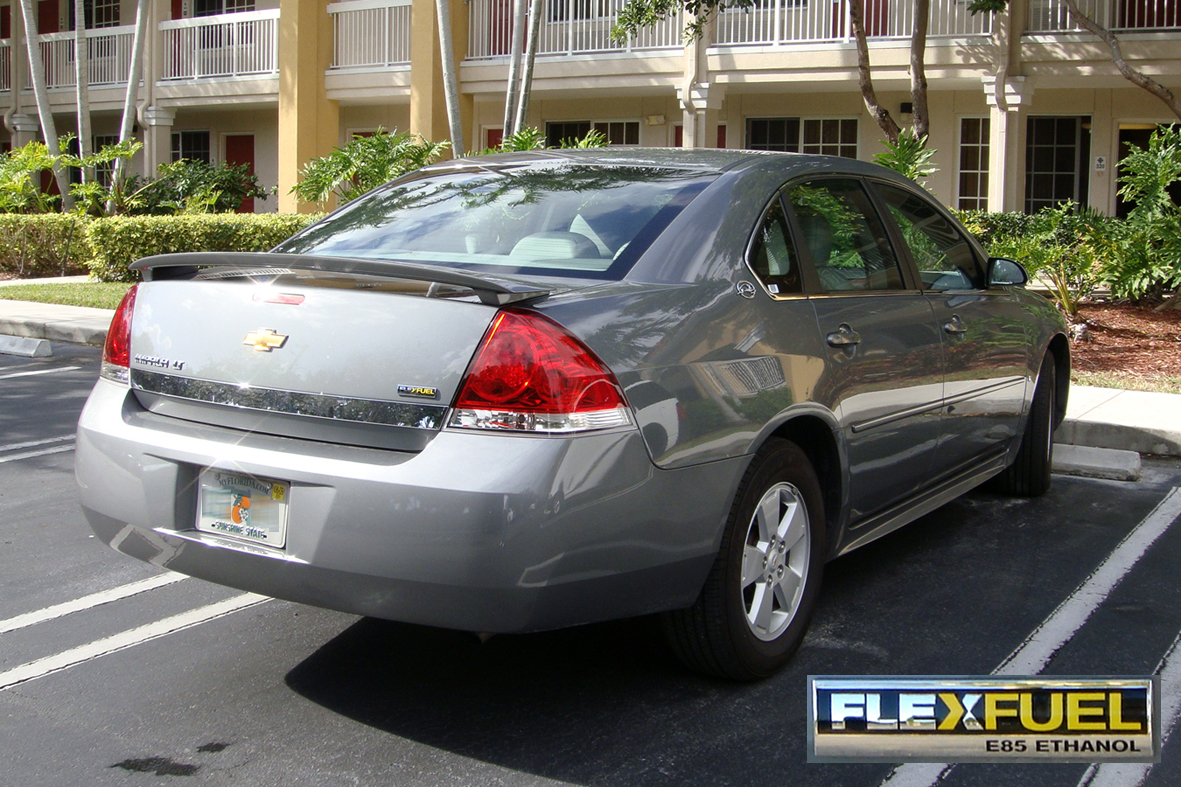
E85 FlexFuel Chevrolet Impala LT 2009 (USA)

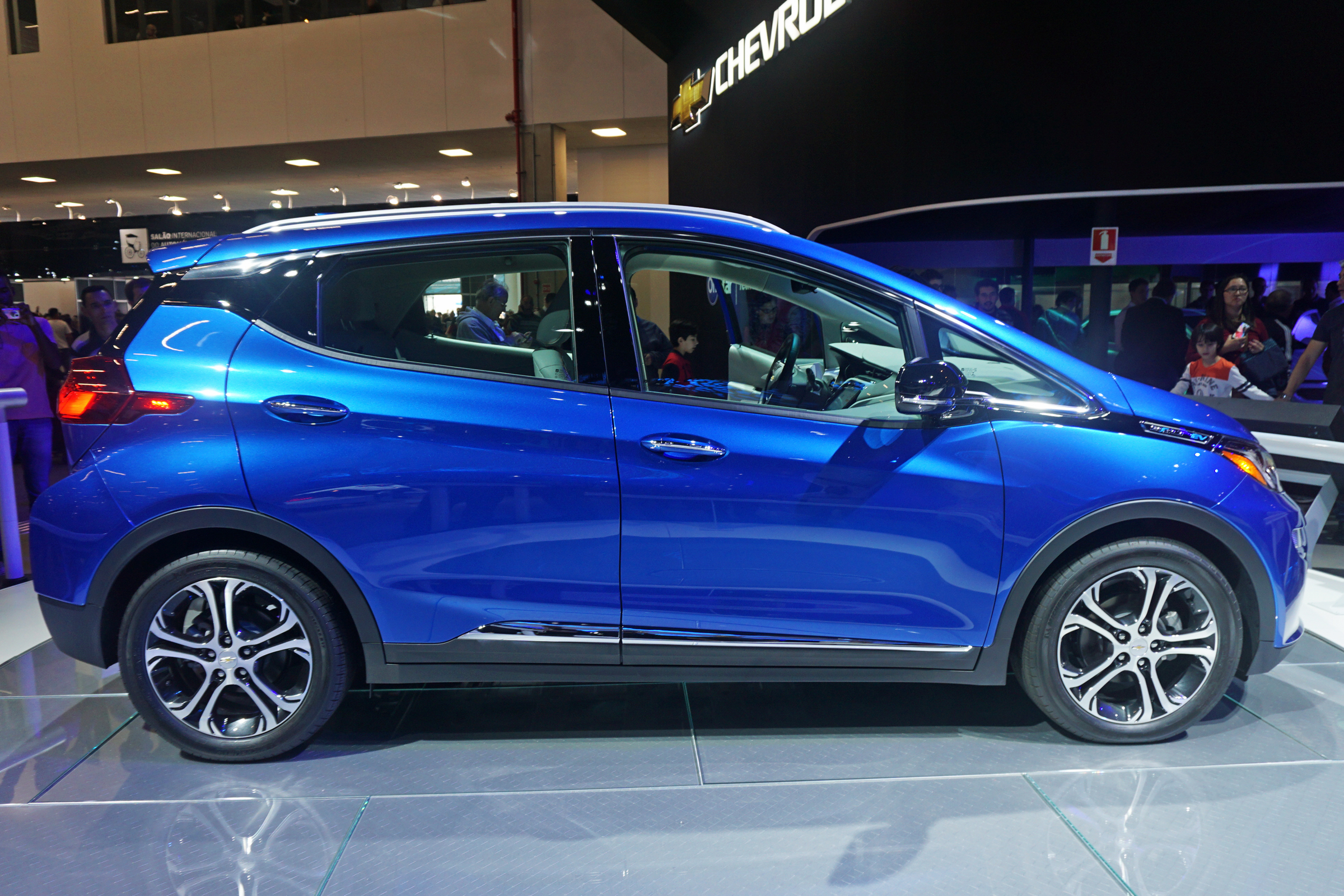
The Chevrolet Bolt EV was released in late 2016.

In October 2011, GM introduced the Chevrolet Spark EV, an all-electric car version of the third generation Chevrolet Spark, the first all-electric passenger car marketed by GM in the U.S. since the General Motors EV1 was discontinued in 1999. The production version was unveiled at the 2012 Los Angeles Auto Show. The Chevrolet Spark was released in the U.S. in selected markets in California and Oregon in June 2013. Retail sales began in South Korea in October 2013.

In 2011, GM revived one of its idled U.S. factories for the production of a subcompact car in Orion, Michigan, with the creation of 1,500 jobs. Production started in late 2011 with the Chevrolet Sonic. GM ended production of the Sonic at Orion Assembly on October 19, 2020.

In 2012, Peugeot parent company PSA Group and GM formed an alliance, including GM acquiring a 7% stake in PSA. The ownership was divested on December 13, 2013, generating gross proceeds of €250 million.

In late 2013, after losing approximately $18 billion over 12 years, GM began phasing out mainstream sales of Chevrolet in Europe and finished by late 2015 to focus on Opel and Vauxhall (Opel's largely identical badge-engineered variant in the UK). The Chevrolet brand had been reintroduced in Europe in 2005, selling mostly rebranded Daewoo Motors cars acquired by GM Korea.

In October 2015, the second-generation Volt was launched in the United States and Canada. The second generation had an upgraded drivetrain and improved battery system that increased the all-electric range from 38 to 53 miles (61 to 85 km).

On March 6, 2017, GM sold its Opel and Vauxhall brands to PSA Group for $2.3 billion.

In October 2017, GM acquired Strobe, a solid-state LIDAR company. Strobe's prototypes produce brief "chirps" of frequency-modulated (FM) laser light, where the frequency within each chirp varies linearly. Measuring the phase and frequency of the echoing chirp allows the system to directly measure both the distance and the velocity of objects on the road ahead. Strobe, Cruise, and GM will work together to develop the technology for future self-driving cars.

In November 2018, GM announced it would lay off more than 14,000 employees in North America, comprising 15% of its workforce and 25% of its executive staff in the region. The company ceased production at three assemblies: Lordstown Assembly in Ohio, Detroit-Hamtramck Assembly in Michigan and Oshawa in Canada and two engine/transmission (White Marsh, Maryland, and Warren, Michigan) plants in 2019.

In November 2018, GM announced that it would cease production of the Chevrolet Volt in February 2019. GM sold a total of 157,054 Volts within the U.S. during its eight-year production tenure through December 2019. However, the Tesla Model 3 and similar Tesla Model Y have since far exceeded the Volt's production levels: as of Q2 2023, Tesla sells more Model 3s and Ys in a single month than GM sold during the Volt's entire lifetime.

In January 2020, GM announced the return of the Hummer nameplate as a series of electric vehicles to be sold from within the GMC portfolio, known as the GMC Hummer EV. The first vehicle, a pickup truck variant with over 1,000 horsepower, shipped in December 2021.

On September 8, 2020, GM announced a partnership with Nikola Corporation to engineer and manufacture the Nikola Badger, and GM made an equity investment in Nikola. Two days later, Nikola founder and chairman Trevor Milton was accused of orchestrating "an intricate fraud" by falsifying a road test suggesting a Nikola test mule was able to propel itself; in reality, the vehicle had been placed at the top of a hill, and was "propelled" solely by gravity. In November 2020, a revised deal was proposed: GM would continue to provide Nikola with the promised fuel-cell technology, but it cut its proposed acquisition of an 11% stake in the company as well as no longer producing the Badger electric pickup truck for the company. The Badger was subsequently cancelled.

In November 2020, GM committed to increased capital investment in electric vehicles to over half of new capital expenditures, totaling $27 billion over five years.

In April 2021, after being criticized for not advertising enough in Black-owned businesses, General Motors said that it will spend 2% of 2021's advertising budget on Black-owned media and 4% in 2022 until reaching 8% in 2025.

In April 2021, GM announced a joint venture with LG to build a $2.3 billion plant to build batteries for electric vehicles.

In November 2021, GM acquired a 25% stake in Pure Watercraft, a producer of all-electric boats.

In January 2022, General Motors announced plans to invest $7 billion to convert a plant in Michigan to produce electric cars and build a new battery plant. It also announced an investment of $154 million into its Western New York Lockport Components plant.

In August 2022, the company offered buyouts to the roughly 2,000 Buick dealers in the US that did not want to make investments as the company switches to an all-electric lineup. This move came after a similar move with Cadillac dealers that reduced their presence by about a third.

In September 2022, the firm announced it would introduce an electric version of its Chevrolet Equinox in the third quarter of 2023, priced around $30,000 to leave it less expensive than comparable vehicles.

In October 2022, the company announced the creation of GM Energy, a unit that would provide battery packs, EV chargers, and software to help residential and business customers to help with charging and electrical grid disruptions.

In May 2023, GM announced the creation of GM Envolve, a synergistic combination of the company's business-to-business products and services into a new division with an emphasis on helping customers with sustainability goals and providing future-forward technology. The new entity is focused on GM's proprietary electric, fuel cell, autonomous and, intelligence platforms.

== History of General Motors in various countries ==
=== South Africa ===
General Motors was criticized for its presence in apartheid South Africa. The company withdrew after pressure from consumers, stockholders and Leon H. Sullivan. It retained a commercial presence, however, in the form of its Opel subsidiary. Right hand drive Opel and Vauxhall production took place in GM's Uitenhage plants outside Port Elizabeth in the Eastern Cape Province, and does so to this day.

=== Argentina ===
In 1925, General Motors settled down in Argentina and started producing the Double Phaeton standard and the Double Phaeton called "Especial Argentino". The production was completed with a sedan model, a roadster and a truck chassis also adaptable to transporting of passengers. Sales increased and soon the Oldsmobile, Oakland and Pontiac brands were incorporated into the assembly line; the capacity of the facility was not enough to supply the increasing demand and the building of a new plant was required. A new 48,000 m2 plant with a covered area was opened in 1929, and since then the Buick, Marquette, La Salle, Cadillac, Vauxhaul and Opel marques also started to be produced.

When the Second World War broke out the operations were complicated. In 1941, 250,000 Chevrolets were made, but shortage of parts made car production impossible. The last Chevrolet left the plant in August, 1942. though in order to avoid total stoppage, the company made electrical and portable refrigerators and car accessories in addition to other items. After the war, GM started producing the Oldsmobile and Pontiac lines and later Chevrolet was added.

Production resumed in 1960 with Chevrolet pickups and shortly thereafter in 1962 it started assembling the first/second generation Chevy II until 1974 as the Chevrolet 400, and the early third-generation (1968 model) Nova as the Chevrolet Chevy from late 1969 through 1978, both models overlapping for several years, the Chevy II marketed as a family sedan while the Nova as a sporty alternative. Several Opel models and Chevrolet pickups are being manufactured.

=== China ===
For the Chinese market, most of its cars are manufactured within China. Shanghai GM, a joint venture with the Chinese company SAIC Motor, was created with Canadian Regal 1990 on March 25, 1997. The Shanghai GM plant was officially opened on December 15, 1998, when the first Chinese-built Buick came off the assembly line. The SAIC-GM-Wuling Automobile joint-venture is also selling microvans under the Wuling brand (34% owned by GM).

Buick has had a strong presence in China from its early introduction with a Canadian Buick sold to the last Emperor of China, later being led by the Buick Regal 1990 subcompact. The last emperor of China owned a Buick.

The Cadillac brand was introduced in China in 2004, starting with exports to China. GM pushed the marketing of the Chevrolet brand in China in the mid-2000s as well. As part of this push, GM transferred the Buick Sail to that brand as an attempt to appeal to Chinese middle-class buyers looking for small and affordable cars.

In August 2009, FAW-GM, a joint venture between GM and FAW Group that mainly produced FAW Jiefang light-duty trucks, was formed. GM left the joint venture in 2019, and the Jiefang brand is now wholly owned by FAW.

In 2011, GM opened an auto research center as part of a US250 million corporate campus in Shanghai to develop gasoline-hybrid cars, electric vehicles and alternative fuel vehicles, engines, and new technologies. A second phase opened in 2012.

SAIC-GM-Wuling established the low-cost Baojun brand to better compete with domestic rivals Chery Automobile, Geely Automobile and BYD Auto for first-time buyers of cars priced around US$10,000.

In 2022 GM founded the Durant Guild (道朗格) lifestyle brand to sell Hummer EV, Cadillac Escalade, Cadillac Escalade IQ, GMC Yukon, Chevrolet Tahoe, Chevrolet Silverado EV, Cadillac Celestiq and Chevrolet Corvette in China. As of 2025, Durant Guild has stopped taking customer orders due to its sales being less than 0.1% of total GM vehicle sales in China.

=== Japan ===
GM maintains a dealership presence in Japan, called GM Chevrolet Shop, previously known as GM Auto World Shop. Current GM Japan dealerships were either former Saturn dealerships or Isuzu dealership locations. Since 1915, GM products are also currently sold by the company Yanase Co., Ltd. currently a subsidiary of ITOCHU Corporation.

GM also had a capital tie-up with Suzuki Motor Corporation from 1981 to 2008, and Suzuki has been a procurement source to GM. A three-way agreement of co-ownership was signed in August 1981, with Isuzu and Suzuki exchanging shares and General Motors taking a 5% share of Suzuki. The Swift and Sidekick were cousins to GM's Geo Metro and Geo Tracker and were mostly produced in Ingersoll, Ontario, Canada by Suzuki and GM's joint venture, CAMI Automotive. The Swift GT/GTi and 4-door models were imported from Japan. In 1998, Suzuki and GM agreed on joint development of compact vehicles, both companies agree to strengthen their business tie-up and form a strategic alliance, and GM increased its equity stake in Suzuki from 3.3% to 10%. GM raised its stake in Suzuki Motor Corp. to 20%. When GM's performance deteriorated, the stake was lowered from 20% to 3% in 2006, and the business tie-up continued. The Suzuki SX4 is produced as a joint venture with Fiat and the XL7 (notice the shortening of the name from Grand Vitara XL-7) was produced as a joint venture with GM at CAMI Automotive Inc. in Ingersoll. Suzuki put XL7 production on indefinite hiatus in mid-2009 due to low demand and subsequently sold off its share of CAMI back to GM later that year. In 2008, the deterioration of GM's business performance has become serious, and the remaining 3% stake will also be sold in 2008. The two companies have agreed to actively promote cooperation in the development of cutting-edge automotive technologies, existing projects, and collaboration in new markets. This agreement is based on mutual confirmation by Osamu Suzuki, chairman and CEO of Suzuki, and Rick Wagoner, Chairman and CEO of GM. Their sourcing business relations still remains in a few countries.

=== Indonesia ===
In August 2011, GM announced plans to build a $150 million 190,300 square-foot plant in Bekasi, West Java, Indonesia, which would produce 40,000 passenger cars per year for the Southeast Asian market. The plant opened on March 11, 2013. The plant was shut in 2015.

GM withdrew the Chevrolet brand from Indonesia in March 2020. However, GM will continue to sell Wuling badged vehicles in Indonesia through SGMW Motor Indonesia.

=== South Korea ===
In October 2011, the South Korea free trade agreement opened the South Korean auto market to American-made cars. GM owns 77.0% of its joint venture in South Korea, GM Korea, which mainly designs and produces Chevrolet and Holden branded vehicles.

In 2011, GM discontinued the Daewoo brand in South Korea and replaced it with the Chevrolet brand.

In 2018, the company approached the Korea Development Bank to participate in a $2.7 billion debt swap issued by its Korean subsidiary.

In February 2018, General Motors shut one factory in South Korea. The plant was affected by the pullout of the Chevrolet brand from Europe.

=== Uzbekistan ===
In 2008, GM Uzbekistan was established, owned 25% by GM. It produced Ravon, Chevrolet, and Daewoo branded vehicles. This interest was sold to the Government of Uzbekistan in 2019.

=== India ===
In 1928, GM became the first car maker to manufacture cars in India. GM entered the market for the second time in 1996. The older Halol, Gujarat plant, with a capacity of 50,000 units, stopped production on April 28, 2017, and was sold to MG Motor India. GM continues to manufacture cars for the export market from its Talegaon Dhamdhere, Maharashtra plant, which has a capacity of 160,000 units annually.

=== Thailand ===
GM stopped production of the Chevrolet Sonic in Thailand in mid-2015.

In February 2020, GM discontinued the Chevrolet brand in Thailand. GM withdrew from the Thai market and sold its Rayong plant to Great Wall Motors.

=== Egypt ===
GM has a long history in Egypt which began in the 1920s with the assembly of cars and light pickup trucks for the local market. In the mid of the 1950s, GM withdrew from the Egyptian market. Some years later, the Ghabbour Brothers began to assemble Cadillac, Chevrolet, and Buick models up to the 1990s.

Since 1983, GM and Al-Monsour Automotive have owned General Motors Egypt, which is currently the only manufacturer of traditional GM branded vehicles in Egypt.

=== Nigeria ===
In the 1920s, Miller Brothers Nigeria was founded as an importer of commercial vehicles of the Bedford brand in the country. In 1949, the company opened its own assembly plant and operated under the name Niger/Nigeria Motors. In 1965, the plant and its distribution network were split into different companies and renamed Federated Motors Industries. In 1991, the company was taken in by a joint venture between General Motors and UACN of Nigeria.

=== Tunisia ===
In 1982, GM formed Industries Mécaniques Maghrébines, which built a plant in Kairouan, Tunisia.

=== East Africa ===
Formed in 1975, General Motors East Africa (GMEA) was the largest assembler of commercial vehicles in the region, exporting them from Kenya to East and Central African countries, including Uganda, Tanzania, Malawi, Rwanda and Burundi. Its facility located in Nairobi assembled a wide range of Isuzu trucks and buses, including the popular Isuzu N-Series versatile light commercial vehicle, TF Series pick-ups, and Isuzu bus chassis. In addition to assembly, GMEA also marketed the Chevrolet Spark and Optra. In 2017, GM sold its 57.7% stake in General Motors East Africa to Isuzu, and GMEA was renamed Isuzu East Africa Limited.

=== South Africa ===
General Motors began operating in South Africa in 1913 through its wholly owned subsidiary, General Motors South Africa, and was a market that briefly had its own local brand, Ranger. Following the passage of the Comprehensive Anti-Apartheid Act in 1986, GM was forced to divest from South Africa, and GMSA became the independent Delta Motor Corporation. GM purchased a 49% stake in Delta in 1997 following the end of apartheid and acquired the remaining 51% in 2004, reverting the company to its original name. By 2014, it was targeting the production of 50,000 cars a year but was being hampered by national labor unrest, strikes, and protests. GM exited the South Africa market in 2017, selling its parts business to Isuzu.

=== New Zealand ===
In New Zealand, GM locally assembled Chevrolet, Buick, Oldsmobile, Cadillac, and Pontiac vehicles from 1926 and Vauxhall cars from 1931. After World War II, the local production of Chevrolet and Vauxhalls resumed, followed by Pontiac in 1959. In 1954, sales of fully imported Holden vehicles into New Zealand began. New Zealand assembly of Holdens began in 1957, and by the end of the 1960s, Holdens replaced all Chevrolets and Pontiacs (both in 1968) and most Vauxhalls. Opel, Bedford, and Isuzu vehicles were assembled or imported at different times during the 1970s, 1980s, and 1990s. All local General Motors assembly plants in New Zealand closed by 1990. GM New Zealand was renamed Holden New Zealand in 1994.

=== Australia ===
GMSV logo

In 1926, GM formed an Australian subsidiary, General Motors (Australia) Limited, which imported, distributed and assembled General Motors products. The bodies were manufactured at an Adelaide-based family business, Holden's Motor Body Builders, which had built up its operations with the help of tariff protection and amicable relations with trade unions. During the Great Depression, Holden's Motor Body Builders collapsed, which allowed General Motors to acquire Holden, becoming General Motors-Holden in 1931. In 1948, the first fully manufactured Australian car, the Holden 48-215, was released to great fanfare amongst the Australian public. It was marketed as "Australia's Own" Holden, and became an iconic feature of post-war Australian culture.

In 2012, GM established Opel as a niche marque in Australia and began to sell Opel branded cars in Australia. However, in August 2013, sales of Opel ceased due to low sales.

In 2020, GM discontinued the Holden brand and HSV brand due to poor reception and sales, shutting the facilities where they were produced. GM continues to export some Chevrolet vehicles to Australia and New Zealand through a new entity called General Motors Specialty Vehicles (GMSV).

As of 2025 GMSV sells the Chevrolet Silverado, Chevrolet Corvette, and GMC Yukon Denali. Cadillac introduced the Cadillac Lyriq in 2024, and will introduce the Cadillac Optiq and Cadillac Vistiq in 2026.

== Corporate spin-offs ==
=== Electronic Data Systems Corporation ===
In 1984, GM acquired Electronic Data Systems Corporation (EDS), a leading data processing and telecommunications company, to be the sole provider of information technology (IT) services for the company. EDS became independent again in 1996, signing a 10-year agreement to continue providing IT services to General Motors.

=== Delco Electronics Corporation ===
Delco Electronics Corporation was the automotive electronics design and manufacturing subsidiary of General Motors.

The name Delco came from the Dayton Engineering Laboratories Co., founded in Dayton, Ohio by Charles Kettering and Edward A. Deeds.

Delco was responsible for several innovations in automobile electric systems, including the first reliable battery ignition system and the first practical automobile self starter.

In 1936, Delco began producing the first dashboard-installed car radios. By the early 1970s, Delco had become a major supplier of automotive electronics equipment. Based in Kokomo, Indiana, Delco Electronics employed more than 30,000 at its peak.

In 1962, GM created the General Motors Research Laboratories, based in Santa Barbara, California, to conduct research and development activities on defense systems. This organization was eventually merged into Delco Electronics and renamed Delco Systems Operations.

In 1985, General Motors purchased Hughes Aircraft and merged it with Delco Electronics to form Hughes Electronics Corporation, an independent subsidiary. In 1997, all of the defense businesses of Hughes Electronics (including Delco Systems Operations) were merged with Raytheon, and the commercial portion of Delco Electronics was transferred to GM's Delphi Automotive Systems business. Delphi became a separate publicly traded company in May 1999, and continued to use the Delco Electronics name for several of its subsidiaries through approximately 2004.

Although Delco Electronics no longer exists as an operating company, GM still retains rights to the Delco name and uses it for some of its subsidiaries including the AC Delco parts division.

=== Hughes Electronics Corporation ===
Hughes logo, adopted after its new owner General Motors

Hughes Electronics Corporation was formed on December 31, 1985, when Hughes Aircraft Company was sold by the Howard Hughes Medical Institute to General Motors for $5.2 billion. General Motors merged Hughes Aircraft with its Delco Electronics unit to form Hughes Electronics Corporation, an independent subsidiary. This division was a major aerospace and defense contractor, civilian space systems manufacturer and communications company. The aerospace and defense business was sold to Raytheon in 1997 and the Space and Communications division was sold to Boeing in 2000. Hughes Research Laboratories became jointly owned by GM, Raytheon, and Boeing. In 2003, the remaining parts of Hughes Electronics were sold to News Corporation and renamed The DirecTV Group.

=== Delphi Corporation ===
Delphi Corp. logo

Delphi was spun off from General Motors on May 28, 1999. Delphi is one of the largest automotive parts manufacturers and has approximately 185,000 employees (50,000 in the United States). With offices worldwide, the company operates 167 wholly owned manufacturing sites, 41 joint ventures, 53 customer centers and sales offices, and 33 technical centers in 38 countries. Delphi makes the Monsoon premium audio systems found in some GM and other manufacturer automobiles.

On October 8, 2005, Delphi filed for Chapter 11 bankruptcy. On March 31, 2006, Delphi announced it would sell off or close 21 of its 29 plants in the United States.

=== Diesel engines ===
Detroit Diesel was originally the GM Diesel Division, then Detroit Diesel Allison Division until 1988. It made diesel engines for truck, generating set and marine use.

Electro-Motive Diesel (EMD) was originally the Electro-Motive Division of GM, until 2005. It made diesel engines and locomotives.

See also General Motors Diesel Division and GM Defense.

=== General Motors Acceptance Corporation ===
By the end of 2006, GM had completed the divestiture of 51% of its financing unit, GMAC.

== General Motors leadership ==
=== Chairmen of the Board of General Motors ===
Chairmen of the Board of General Motors

- Thomas Neal – November 19, 1912 – November 16, 1915
- Pierre S. du Pont – November 16, 1915 – February 7, 1929
- Lammot du Pont II – February 7, 1929 – May 3, 1937
- Alfred P. Sloan Jr. – May 3, 1937 – April 2, 1956
- Albert Bradley – April 2, 1956 – August 31, 1958
- Frederic G. Donner – September 1, 1958 – October 31, 1967
- James M. Roche – November 1, 1967 – December 31, 1971
- Richard C. Gerstenberg – January 1, 1972 – November 30, 1974
- Thomas A. Murphy – December 1, 1974 – December 31, 1980
- Roger B. Smith – January 1, 1981 – July 31, 1990
- Robert C. Stempel – August 1, 1990 – November 1, 1992
- John G. Smale – November 2, 1992 – December 31, 1995
- John F. "Jack" Smith Jr. – January 1, 1996 – April 30, 2003
- G. Richard Wagoner Jr. – May 1, 2003 – March 30, 2009
- Kent Kresa – March 30, 2009 – July 10, 2009
- Edward ("Ed") Whitacre Jr. – July 10, 2009 – December 31, 2010
- Dan Akerson – December 31, 2010 – January 15, 2014
- Tim Solso – January 15, 2014 – January 4, 2016
- Mary Barra – January 4, 2016 – Present

=== Chief Executive Officers of General Motors ===
Chief Executive Officers of General Motors

- Alfred P. Sloan Jr. – May 10, 1923 – June 3, 1946
- Charles Erwin Wilson – June 3, 1946 – January 26, 1953
- Harlow H. Curtice – February 2, 1953 – August 31, 1958
- James M. Roche – November 1, 1967 – December 31, 1971
- Richard C. Gerstenberg – January 1, 1972 – November 30, 1974
- Thomas A. Murphy – December 1, 1974 – December 31, 1980
- Roger B. Smith – January 1, 1981 – July 31, 1990
- Robert C. Stempel – August 1, 1990 – November 1, 1992
- John F. "Jack" Smith Jr. – November 2, 1992 – May 31, 2000
- G. Richard Wagoner Jr. – June 1, 2000 – March 30, 2009
- Frederick A. "Fritz" Henderson – March 30, 2009 – December 1, 2009
- Edward ("Ed") Whitacre Jr. – December 1, 2009 – September 1, 2010
- Dan Akerson – September 1, 2010 – January 15, 2014
- Mary Barra – January 15, 2014 – Present

=== Vice Chairmen of General Motors ===
Vice Chairmen of General Motors

- Donaldson Brown – May 3, 1937 – June 3, 1946
- George Russell – November 1, 1967 – March 31, 1970
- Richard C. Gerstenberg – April 6, 1970 – December 31, 1971
- Thomas A. Murphy – January 1, 1972 – November 30, 1974
- Richard L. Terrell – October 1, 1974 – January 1, 1979
- Oscar A. Lundin – December 1, 1974 – November 30, 1975
- Howard H. Kerhl – February 1, 1981 – December 31, 1986
- Donald J. Atwood – June 1, 1987 – April 19, 1989
- John F. "Jack" Smith Jr. – August 1, 1990 – April 6, 1992
- Robert J. Schultz – August 1, 1990 – November 1, 1992
- Harry J. Pearce – January 1, 1996 – May 25, 2001
- John M. Devine – January 1, 2001 – June 1, 2006
- Robert A. Lutz – September 1, 2001 – May 1, 2010
- Frederick A. "Fritz" Henderson – January 1, 2006 – March 3, 2008

=== Presidents of General Motors ===
Presidents of General Motors

- George E. Daniels – September 22, 1908 – October 20, 1908
- William M. Eaton – October 20, 1908 – November 23, 1910
- James J. Storrow – November 23, 1910 – January 26, 1911
- Thomas Neal – January 26, 1911 – November 19, 1912
- Charles W. Nash – November 19, 1912 – June 1, 1916
- William C. Durant – June 1, 1916 – November 30, 1920
- Pierre S. du Pont – November 30, 1920 – May 10, 1923
- Alfred P. Sloan Jr. – May 10, 1923 – May 3, 1937
- William S. Knudsen – May 3, 1937 – September 3, 1940
- Charles E. Wilson – January 6, 1941 – January 26, 1953
- Harlow H. Curtice – February 2, 1953 – August 31, 1958
- John F. Gordon – September 1, 1958 – May 31, 1965
- James M. Roche – June 1, 1965 – October 31, 1967
- Edward N. Cole – November 1, 1967 – September 30, 1974
- Elliott M. Estes – October 1, 1974 – January 31, 1981
- F. James McDonald – February 1, 1981 – August 31, 1987
- Robert C. Stempel – September 1, 1987 – July 31, 1990
- Lloyd E. Reuss – August 1, 1990 – April 6, 1992 (Note: The father of current GM president Mark Reuss.)
- John F. "Jack" Smith Jr. – April 6, 1992 – October 5, 1998
- G. Richard Wagoner Jr. – October 5, 1998 – March 29, 2009
- Frederick A. "Fritz" Henderson – March 31, 2009 – December 1, 2009
- Dan Ammann – January 2014 – January 2019
- Mark Reuss – January 1, 2019

== Criticism ==
=== Nazi collaboration ===
In August 1938, before World War Two, a senior executive for General Motors, James D. Mooney, received the Grand Cross of the German Eagle for his distinguished service to the Reich. "Nazi armaments chief Albert Speer told a congressional investigator that Germany could not have attempted its September 1939 Blitzkrieg of Poland without the performance-boosting additive technology provided by Alfred P. Sloan and General Motors". During the war, GM's Opel Brandenburg plant produced trucks, parts for Ju 88 aircraft, land mines and torpedo detonators for Nazi Germany. Charles Levinson, formerly deputy director of the European office of the CIO, alleged in his book, Vodka-Cola extensive collaboration and information sharing between US and German divisions of General Motors during the war.

Sloan's memoir presents a different picture of Opel's wartime existence. According to Sloan, Opel was nationalized (along with most other industrial activity owned or co-owned by foreign interests) by the German state soon after the outbreak of war. Sloan presents Opel at the end of the war as a black box to GM's American management—an organization that the Americans had had no contact with for five years. According to Sloan, GM in Detroit debated whether to even try to run Opel in the postwar era, or to leave to the interim West German government the question of who would pick up the pieces. But Opel was never factually nationalized and the GM-appointed directors and management remained unchanged throughout the war, dealing with other GM companies in Axis and Allied countries including the United States.

In April 1939, defending the German investment strategy as "highly profitable", Alfred P. Sloan had told shareholders that GM's continued industrial production for the Nazi government was merely sound business practice. In a letter to a concerned shareholder, Sloan said that the manner in which the Nazi government ran Germany "should not be considered the business of the management of General Motors....We must conduct ourselves as a German organization.… We have no right to shut down the plant." “In other words, to put the proposition rather bluntly,” Sloan said in the letter, “such matters should not be considered the business of the management of General Motors.”

After 20 years of researching General Motors, Bradford Snell alleged that, "General Motors was far more important to the Nazi war machine than Switzerland ... Switzerland was just a repository of looted funds. GM's Opel division was an integral part of the German war effort. The Nazis could have invaded Poland and Russia without Switzerland. They could not have done so without GM." The day before the German invasion of Poland, which was aided by Nazi soldiers who drove in GM Blitz vehicles, Sloan reportedly told shareholders that GM was “too big” to be impeded by “petty international squabbles.” However, a letter which Mooney wrote to shareholders in June 1940 confirmed that Nazi Germany had nationalized the Opel plant by this point in time.

On June 26, 1940, one day after the Fall of France, Mooney was present at a celebratory dinner at the Manhattan Waldorf Astoria organized by Gerhard Alois Westrick. Other attendees included Sosthenes Behn of ITT, Torkild Rieber of Texaco, Edsel Ford of Ford Motor Company, and Philip Dakin Wagoner of the Underwood Typewriter Company. That same year, a senior GM executive wrote that “the management of Adam Opel A.G. is in the hands of German nationals,” while also noting that it was still “actively represented by two American executives on the Board of Directors.” In April 1941, Walter Carpenter, a GM board member and vice president of DuPont, advised Sloan, who used South America as a way of keeping business relations with Nazi Germany following U.S. sanctions against the country, to end the business relations, stating "If we don’t listen to the urgings of the State Department in this connection, it seems to me just a question of time ... The effect of this will be to associate the General Motors with Nazi or Fascist propaganda against the interests of the United States ... The effect on the General Motors Corporation might be a very serious matter and the feeling might last for years.” Around this time, Assistant Secretary of State Adolf Berle would successfully urge the FBI to investigate GM. The investigation would find no evidence of disloyalty to American policy, but would also name both Sloan and Mooney in the final report and detail Mooney's ties to Nazi Germany. Mooney, who was in charge of GM's multinational operations, had resigned from the company in 1940.

=== Great American streetcar scandal theory ===
The Great American Streetcar Scandal is an unproven theory developed by Robert Eldridge Hicks in 1970 and published by Grossman Publishers in 1973 in the book Politics of Land, Ralph Nader's Study Group Report on Land Use in California at pp. 410–412, compiled by Robert C. Fellmeth, Center for Study of Responsive Law, and put forth by Bradford Snell again in 1974, in which GM, along with road-builders, is alleged to have engaged in a policy that triggered the shift from the mass transportation of the previous century to the 'one-person-one-car' trip of today. The theory states that in order to expand auto sales and maximize profits GM bought local mass transit systems and privately owned railways, following which it would proceed to eliminate them and replace them all with GM-built buses. Alternative versions of the events have been put forth by scholars in the field. Slater, Cosgrove and Span all put forth evidence that counters Snell's theory.

=== Ralph Nader ===
Consumer advocate Ralph Nader issued a series of attacks on vehicle safety issues from GM—particularly the Chevrolet Corvair—in his book Unsafe at Any Speed, written in 1965. This first major work undertaken by Nader established his reputation as a crusader for safety. GM was accused of sending spies after him. The company was questioned at a Senate hearing in March 1966 about its attempted intimidation of Nader. Senators Robert Kennedy and Abe Ribicoff questioned CEO James Roche. In the end, the CEO apologized to Nader. The hearings led to legislation which created the United States Department of Transportation and predecessor agencies of the National Highway Traffic Safety Administration later that year. Nader sued GM in November 1966 for invasion of privacy, winning the case on appeal in January, 1970.

=== Top-level management ===
In 1980, J. Patrick Wright wrote a book named On a Clear Day You Can See General Motors. This book, which critics acclaimed "blows the lid off the king of carmakers" was about the allegations of corruption, "mismanagement and total irresponsibility" at the top level of the company, as seen by John Z. DeLorean, the vice-president, who, in 1973, resigned from his position in spite of a brilliant and meteoric rise. He was earning $650,000 per year and was expected to be the next President of GM.

=== Climate change denial ===
In 1989, GM joined the Global Climate Coalition, which opposed efforts to reduce greenhouse emissions during the George H. W. Bush administration. It withdrew from the lobbying group in March 2000 after criticism from environmental groups.

== See also ==
- Fisher P-75 Eagle
- FM/F2M Wildcat
- F3M Bearcat (none actually built)
- TBM Avenger
- List of General Motors factories

== Bibliography ==
=== Works cited ===
- Sloan, Alfred P. (1964), McDonald, John (ed.), My Years with General Motors, Garden City, NY, US: Doubleday, LCCN 64011306, OCLC 802024. Republished in 1990 with a new introduction by Peter Drucker (ISBN 978-0385042352).

=== Further reading ===
- Barabba, Vincent P. Surviving Transformation: Lessons from GM's Surprising Turnaround (2004)
- Chandler, Alfred D. Jr., ed. Giant Enterprise: Ford, General Motors, and the Automobile Industry 1964.
- Cray, Ed. Chrome Colossus: General Motors and Its Times. 1980.
- Farber, David. Sloan Rules: Alfred P. Sloan and the Triumph of General Motors U of Chicago Press 2002
- Gustin, Lawrence R. Billy Durant: Creator of General Motors, 1973.
- Halberstam, David. The Reckoning (1986) detailed reporting on the crises of 1973-mid-1980s
- Keller, Maryann. Rude Awakening: The Rise, Fall, and Struggle for Recovery of General Motors, 1989.
- Leslie, Stuart W. Boss Kettering: Wizard of General Motors Columbia University Press, 1983.
- Maxton, Graeme P. and John Wormald, Time for a Model Change: Re-engineering the Global Automotive Industry (2004)
- Maynard, Micheline. The End of Detroit: How the Big Three Lost Their Grip on the American Car Market (2003)
- Rae, John B. The American Automobile: A Brief History. University of Chicago Press, 1965.
- Weisberger, Bernard A. The Dream Maker: William C. Durant, Founder of General Motors, 1979
- General Motors World 1927, The Historic truth on GM 1927

Videos

- "Why General Motors Left Europe". CNBC. May 14, 2019. Archived from the original on December 15, 2021.
