= William Eaton =

William Eaton or Bill Eaton may refer to:

- William Eaton (soldier) (1764–1811), United States Army soldier during the Barbary Wars
- William Eaton (athlete) (1909–1938), British long-distance runner
- William Eaton (guitarist), American luthier and guitar player
- William Eaton (scientist), American biophysicist
- William W. Eaton (1816–1898), politician from Connecticut
- William Eaton, 2nd Baron Cheylesmore (1843–1902), collector of English mezzotint portraits
- William R. Eaton (1877–1942), U.S. Representative from Colorado
- William J. Eaton (1930–2005), American journalist
- William A. Eaton (born 1952), U.S. diplomat
- William M. Eaton (1856–1923), American businessman
- William W. Eaton (epidemiologist), epidemiologist and psychiatrist, winner of the 2000 Rema Lapouse Award

== See also ==
- William E. Chandler (William Eaton Chandler, 1835–1917), lawyer; U.S. Secretary of the Navy and U.S. Senator from New Hampshire
