= Daniels Motor Company =

Defunct American motor vehicle manufacturer

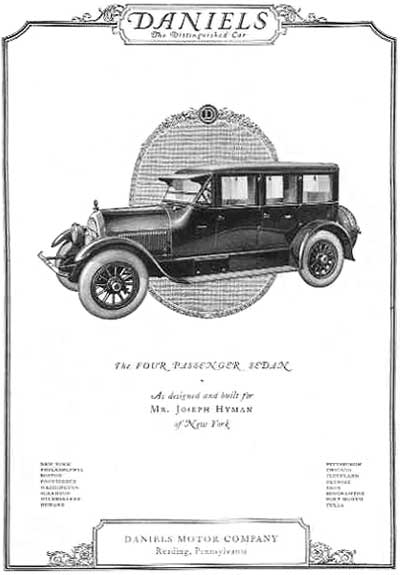
- Daniels 8 limo (1919)
- Type: Manufacturer
- Industry: Automobile
- Founded: 1915 in Reading, Pennsylvania, United States of America
- Founder: George E. Daniels and Neff E. Parish
- Defunct: 1924
- Fate: Closed
- Headquarters: Reading, Pennsylvania, United States of America
- Products: Daniels Eight

Daniels Motor Company was a pioneer brass era American automobile company, founded in 1915 by George E. Daniels (formerly of General Motors) with Neff E. Parish. George Daniels was a known lawyer, engineer, and mechanic. He was considered the best motorcar designer in the United States. Neff Parish had his own automobile parts and framing manufacturing company. Neff was the creator of the time's highest-grade heat-treated alloy steel frames, respected in the steel industry. Daniels Motor Company produced 1,500 high-quality automobiles between 1916 and 1924, branding themselves as “the distinguished car with just a little more power than you will ever need”, and “The aristocrat of American cars”.

No stock models were created. Daniels cars were built to be permanent personal pieces of art. Each car fabricated was crafted for the individual buyer. With custom coachwork, the Daniels was a bespoke car, built to order, offering a proprietary narrow-angle V8 as standard equipment, for a price (in 1922) of US$7,450. By contrast, the 1913 Lozier Big Six limousines and landaulettes were US$6,500, tourers and roadsters US$5,000; the Lozier Light Six Metropolitan tourer and runabout started at US$3,250; Americans ran from US$525 down to US$4250; the Enger 40 was US$2000, the FAL US$1750, the Oakland 40 US$1600, and both the Cole 30 US$1500, and Colt Runabout were US$1500. Below that, presumably, a Daniels customer would not have looked.

== Beginning ==
The Daniels Motor Company was incorporated in 1915. Its president, George E. Daniels, was an incorporator of General Motors, a branch manager for Buick, and vice president and general of the Oakland Motor Car Company. The company outfitted a 30,000 square foot factory in Reading, Pennsylvania formerly occupied by the Mt. Penn Stove Works. Daniels chose to specialize on an eight cylinder car and chose Herschell–Spillman, which constructed engines for the Curtiss Aeroplane and Motor Company, to be his engine supplier.

In 1916, Daniels Motor Company produced 142 Model A Daniels Eight Cylinder cars with several body styles. As Daniels did all of its own production, the company never had to refuse buyers due to high demand unlike competitors. In 1917, the three passenger Coupe Model B was produced. Prices ranged from $3,100 to $5,200. In 1919, between one hundred and two hundred Cloverleaf Coupe model Cs were produced. This model displayed the first Daniels-built engine. The engine, designed by the same Italian engineer who created the best four-cylinder engines in Europe, proved inadequate and had to be reconfigured.

== 1920s ==
In 1920, Daniels announced it would be opening a new plant in Philadelphia, Pennsylvania, and premiered the V8 engine. Production was expected to be 1,500 automobiles annually at the new facility. Seven different body styles were available with V8 engines, with designs ranging from the seven-passenger touring cars priced $4,750 to the Daniels limousine at $6,250. In 1921, prices increased and existing models experienced moderate design changes. In 1922, the Daniels Motor Company opened a new office in Brooklyn, New York, intended to serve Brooklyn and Long Island residents and announced the plan to double output of all Daniels' plants within two months' time. This office was the first Daniels to offer a service station to all Daniels Motor Company buyers with Daniels Motor Company-specific tools and equipment. George Daniels cited providing service stations as the most important facet of his business structure, as it was a major driver of sales. In its prime, Daniels Motor Company had between 15 and 20 agents across the US. That same year, Daniels released a statement explaining the company would be cutting prices for the first time. The president warned buyers no further reductions were expected and prices are to rise again within 90 days. At the same time, a majority of the company's preferred stock was offered on the New York Stock Exchange.

== Financial crisis ==
In 1923, the company underwent “unusual” procedures to take back its declaration of dividends. A series of internal business problems lead to the initial breakdown of the company. A federal judge rejected an offer of $84,271 made for assets of Daniels Motor Company at public auction for the company's Reading plant. The auction was held by the company's receivers of equity under adherence of the US court system. The courts told receivers they could apply later for a re-sale after they have considered two proposals made in court. First, the president asked for two weeks to develop a reorganization plan. Second, one bidder offered to buy the land for $110,000. The second option fell through when the court found the proposal inadequate. In 1924, as a last-ditch effort to save the business, the company announced its line of products would begin to be sold at higher prices in order to make a profit. Additionally, it was announced the moving of its company headquarters from Reading to Philadelphia. Later in 1924, anyone holding claims against the “defunct” Daniels Motor Company were notified to present their claims to the Philadelphia court district who has appointed a special master dedicated to passing the final accounts of the corporation.

In a statement from the company:

With a desire to produce the best material available and to obtain products at the lowest prices, a heavy cash investment was made in raw materials. These expenditures have placed the company in the position of not having sufficient cash to conduct its business along the best and most economical lines. With the object of conserving assets, protecting the creditors, serving the public, and to insure a continuation of the company as soon as the present financial situation is straightened out, the company is asking for a temporary receiver in equity.

The corporation was sold by the order of the district court. One hundred people attended the public auction and six bids were made. George Billman, a real estate dealer, bought the Reading plant property. The property was estimated to be worth $300,000. George Nagle purchased the name, trademarks, and drawings for $1,900. Levene Motor Company of Philadelphia acquired the assets of Daniels Motor Company. The company paid $90,000, $50,000 subject to mortgage. The company planned to invest $20,000 in improvements to convert the plan to a warehouse and manufacturing facility for their own purposes.

== Post operation ==
In 1953, a 32-year-old Daniels 1921 model D car was up for auction in California. The original cost was $6,500. It was believed to be the last existing 1921 Daniels Model D in existence, and one of fifteen remaining Daniels cars in the world. Chassis numbers 1915 101-108 Model A Herschell Spillman engine 1916 109-250 Model A Herschell Spillman engine 1917 251-400 Model A Herschell Spillman engine 1918 401-? Model B Herschell Spillman engine 1919 601-? 1920 ?-1350 1921 1351-1769 1922 1838-2087 1923 2089-?

== See also ==
- List of automobile manufacturers
- List of defunct automobile manufacturers

== Sources ==
- Clymer, Floyd. Treasury of Early American Automobiles, 1877-1925. New York: Bonanza Books, 1950.
