= José Ignacio López de Arriortúa =

Spanish automotive executive (1941–2026)

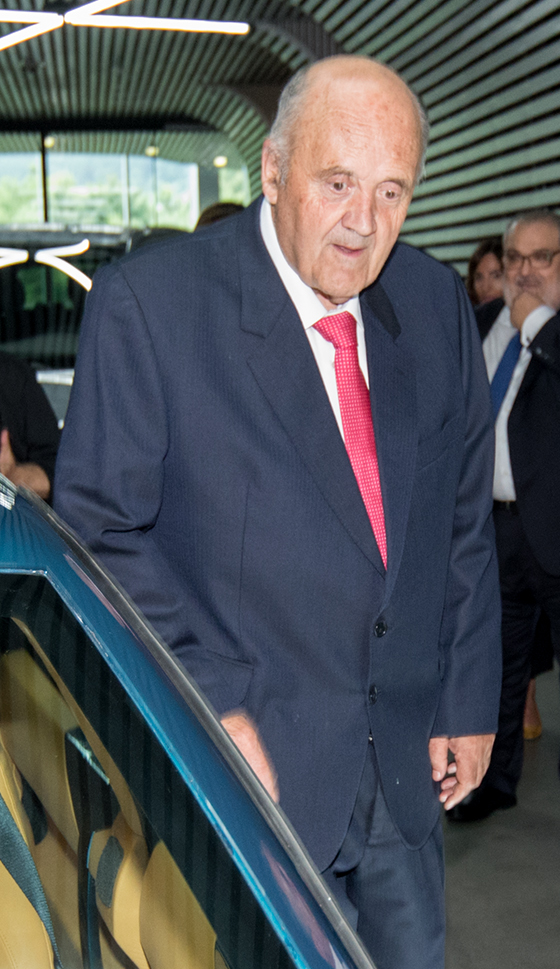
- Born: 18 January 1941; Amorebieta, Spain
- Died: 10 June 2026 (aged 85)
- Occupations: Head of Process Optimization and Procurement at Volkswagen
- Known for: López Effect

José Ignacio López de Arriortúa (18 January 1941 – 10 June 2026) was a Spanish businessman who held senior positions at Opel, General Motors and Volkswagen. He was known for his assertive style dealing with suppliers, managing lean production and driving down cost. During the 1990s he was caught in the "López affair" when his former employer GM accused VW of corporate espionage, alleging that López took GM trade secrets to VW.

== Early life and education ==
López was born in Amorebieta, Basque Country, Spain, where his father ran a car repair workshop. He studied manufacturing engineering and operations control in Bilbao. He was awarded a Doctor of Engineering in 1966.

== Career ==
López started his career at Westinghouse and Firestone in Spain.

He joined GM in 1980. Initially working at the Zaragoza plant, he became Head of Purchasing for GM's subsidiary Opel in Rüsselsheim in 1987. There he established consumer price-driven production methods dubbed "Purchased Input Concept Optimisation with Suppliers" or PICOS, which reversed commonly held supplier-manufacturer relations in the automotive industry. When GM Europe President Jack Smith was promoted to CEO of the parent GM, López was appointed global Vice President of Procurement where he relocated to Detroit, and applied his PICOS processes which resulted in reported savings of US$1bn. After only one year in his position, López abruptly resigned from GM in 1993, purportedly as executives decided to build an automotive plant with his lean production system in Poland or Hungary instead of his native Spain as initially promised. Smith offered to promote López to president of North American operations, but López had already departed for Wolfsburg having accepted a position at Volkswagen. In leaving Detroit, López claimed that his family wanted to return to Europe.

In 1993, Volkswagen poached López and three GM purchasing executives, and he was appointed Head of Process Optimization and Procurement. VW chairman Ferdinand Piëch who aimed to cut costs had wooed López with the promise that a plant would be built in the Basque region of Spain, while López's lean production system would be applied to the existing Wolfsburg plant. GM immediately filed a civil suit against VW for corporate espionage for López taking documents to VW relating to key GM trade secrets for factory operations, supplier prices, and Opel new car designs, plus Lopez's hiring would have violated his non-compete clause with GM. Around the same time, in what was called the "López Affair" by the press, German authorities raided the offices and homes of López and the three former GM executives as part of an investigation that led to criminal charges being filed on 12 December 1996 (the charges were dropped in 1998), while US authorities unsuccessfully requested his extradition from Spain on similar charges. Three days after a U.S. court in Detroit ruled that federal racketeering laws could be invoked in GM's civil suit against VW which could potentially result in triple damages, Lopez resigned from VW on 30 November 1996, which was also seen as a step for VW to distance itself from the scandal. In 1997 a settlement was reached where VW paid $100 million in damages to GM, and agreed to buy $1 billion in GM parts over seven years.

After resigning from VW in 1996, López established a consulting practice in Spain and later on unsuccessfully attempted to establish a Spanish car company.

== López Effect ==
López introduced a number of changes to the supply chains and production methods at Volkswagen and GM known as "Purchased Input Concept Optimisation with Suppliers" or PICOS. The particular focus was on reduction of supplier prices so that a target end price of cars could be achieved. While he was at Opel, the manufacturer's input prices continuously fell, while prices in the overall market increased. The reduction in supplier prices was achieved by systematic price negotiations in a competitive market where a larger number of suppliers faced increasingly integrated car companies. López's success in those price negotiations that resulted in a positive impact on overall cost basis had been dubbed "López Effect". However, as suppliers increasingly struggled to deliver at cost, input part quality started to deteriorate which in turn had a negative effect car build quality. The "López Effect" is therefore used for both those effects.

Automotive News suggested that López "knows all the tricks—how to use emotion, flattery, jokes, threats, ruthlessness, even lying if need be" to wring cuts from reluctant suppliers. In an example of his strong-arm tactics, he was known to march "into a supplier's office, announcing that the company's work was subpar or overpriced, and issuing an edict for corrective action" for the supplier to keep its contract with GM. It was suggested that López even shared proprietary information with competitors to force lower bids from suppliers. Supporters said that López sent GM teams to a supplier to make it more competitive in terms of cost and quality, creating a "win-win" situation for the supplier and GM.

== Death ==
López de Arriortúa died on 10 June 2026, at the age of 85.
