= Kent Kresa =

American businessman (born 1938)

- Born: March 24, 1938 (age 88); New York City, US
- Education: Massachusetts Institute of Technology (BS, MS, EAA)
- Occupation: businessman
- Title: Northrop Grumman (Former chairman & CEO); General Motors (Former chairman)
- Father: Helmy Kresa

Kent Kresa (born March 24, 1938) is an American businessman. Formerly, he was chairman and CEO of Northrop Grumman, as well as chairman of General Motors; and has worked with the Defense Advanced Research Projects Agency (DARPA), the Lincoln Laboratory at MIT, Avery Dennison, the Fluor Corporation, and the MannKind Corporation. Before being appointed as interim chairman of General Motors as a result the decisions made by President Barack Obama, Kresa was on the board.

== Education ==
Kresa was born in New York City; his father was the songwriter Helmy Kresa. He has B.S., M.S., and E.A.A. degrees from Massachusetts Institute of Technology in aeronautics and astronautics, and received an honorary doctorate from Pepperdine University in 2003.

== Career ==
Kresa's career began when he was employed by the top-secret DARPA, where he was responsible for broad, applied research and development programs in the tactical and strategic defense arena. Then from 1961–68, Kresa was associated with the Lincoln Laboratory at the Massachusetts Institute of Technology (M.I.T.), where he worked on ballistic missile defense research and reentry technology. Kresa then joined Northrop in 1975, became chairman in 1987, then CEO in 1990.

In 1997, he was elected as a member into the National Academy of Engineering for contributions in aeronautical technology.

When Kresa took over Northrop Grumman, he transformed the company, which like GM was on the brink of extinction. In a 2002 Los Angeles Times interview when the company was on the verge of closing, Kresa was quoted saying, "We could just go out of business and give money back to our shareholders or we could reinvent ourselves...It became clear to us we could take the latter path."

Under Kresa's control, Northrop Grumman was transformed resulting in the acquisition of 16 companies including TRW (with its Space Park in Redondo Beach, California). Overall, Northrop went from an annual revenue of $5 billion to $28 billion during the time of the Gulf War. Kresa retired from head of Northrop in 2003.

On November 3, 2003, The Carlyle Group hired Kresa as a Senior Advisor to its aerospace and defense group. Kresa commented on his hiring by stating, “I’ve known the Carlyle executives for many years and have an abiding respect for their approach and judgment. For years, Carlyle has played a significant role in the aerospace and defense market. Carlyle has a straightforward approach to its business and delivers on its promises. I’m delighted to be associated with them.”

He was named the chairman of GM on March 30, 2009, after Rick Wagoner, the chairman and CEO of GM was ordered to resign by U.S. president Barack Obama. In an interview in 2008, he was asked if he thought that bailout money should come with a requirement that Wagoner be ousted. He replied "...And we're going to have to look at whatever the demands are from the individual who's bringing the money. But I don't think it's reasonable." Kresa was replaced as chairman by former AT&T CEO Ed Whitacre on July 10, 2009.

Business positions
Preceded by Rick Wagoner	Chairman of General Motors; 2009	Succeeded by Ed Whitacre
