= Frederick Henderson =

American automotive executive

- Born: Frederick Arthur Henderson; November 29, 1958 (age 67); Detroit, Michigan, US
- Other name: Fritz
- Education: University of Michigan (BBA); Harvard University (MBA)
- Occupations: SVP, Sunoco, Inc., Chairman, CEO SunCoke Energy
- Predecessor: Rick Wagoner
- Successor: Edward Whitacre, Jr.
- Spouse: Karen Lucht Henderson
- Children: Sarah, Emily

Frederick Arthur "Fritz" Henderson (born November 29, 1958) is a former president and chief executive officer (CEO) of General Motors (GM).

He replaced Rick Wagoner as CEO of GM when Wagoner stepped down after serving in that position for eight years, at the request of President Barack Obama, in relation to the General Motors Chapter 11 reorganization. Henderson assumed the new position on March 31, 2009. Prior to this appointment, Henderson was the Vice President of General Motors and had been with the company since 1984. Henderson resigned as CEO of GM on December 1, 2009.

== Early life and education ==
Henderson was born in Detroit, Michigan. He is a 1976 graduate of Lake Orion High School in Lake Orion, Michigan.

He holds a Bachelor of Business Administration degree from the University of Michigan's Ross School of Business and a Master of Business Administration degree from Harvard Business School. During his time at Michigan, Henderson pitched for the University of Michigan Wolverines baseball team.

== Career ==
Henderson joined General Motors in 1984. He held a number of positions with the company until 1992 when he became GMAC group vice president of finance in Detroit. From 1997 to 2000, he was GM vice president and managing director of GM do Brasil covering GM operations in Brazil, Argentina, Paraguay, and Uruguay. He was successful in introducing small, inexpensive cars such as the Celta subcompact and the Meriva microvan, both produced in Brazil.

In June 2000, he was appointed group vice president and president of GM-LAAM (Latin America, Africa and Middle East) and in January 2002, he moved to Singapore as president of GM Asia Pacific where he was successful in expanding operations in Korea and China.

In 2004, Henderson was appointed chairman of GM Europe, based in Zurich, Switzerland, where he undertook substantial restructuring including significant reductions in jobs. After becoming vice chairman and chief financial officer in January 2006, in March 2009, he became GM president and chief operating officer.

On December 1, 2009, Henderson resigned from General Motors as CEO and was replaced by board Chairman Edward Whitacre, Jr. (former head of AT&T Inc.), who temporarily was CEO while a global search for a new permanent replacement was conducted. On January 25, 2010, Whitacre announced that he would become the permanent CEO while keeping his current chairman of board of directors role. On February 19, 2010, GM announced that Henderson would serve as a consultant on the company's international operations, to be paid $59,090 per month ($709,080 per year).

On September 2, 2010, Sunoco, Inc. announced that Henderson would join the company as senior vice president, and that he would lead the company's SunCoke Energy unit as chairman and CEO when it was spun off in 2011.

On June 11, 2018, Adient plc announced that Henderson would replace former CEO R. Bruce McDonald as interim CEO, pending a search for a full-time replacement for McDonald.

== Personal life ==
Henderson is married to Karen Henderson and has two daughters, Sarah and Emily Henderson.

Business positions
Preceded by Rick Wagoner	President of General Motors; 2009	Vacant
Preceded by Rick Wagoner	Chief Executive Officer of General Motors; 2009	Succeeded by Edward Whitacre, Jr. Interim
