= Edward Whitacre Jr. =

American businessman

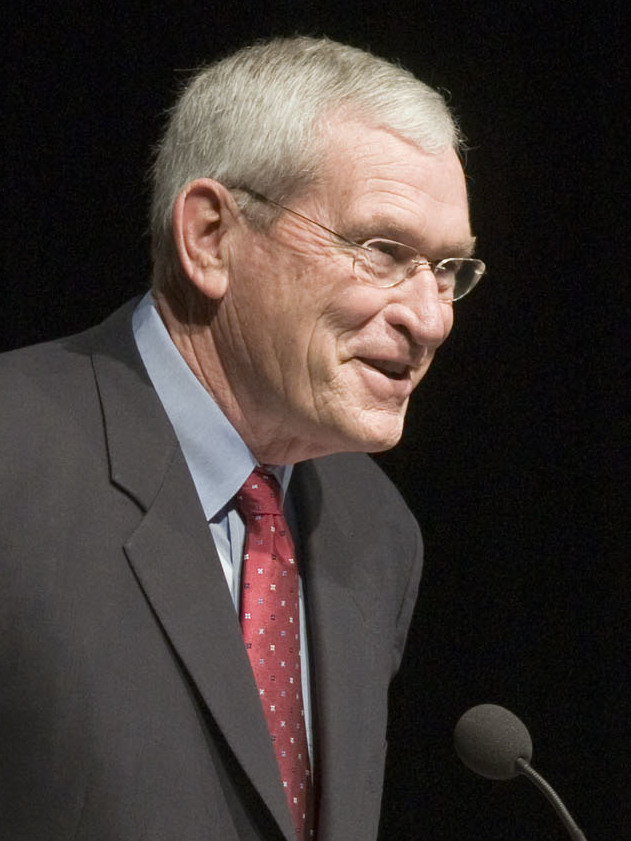
- Whitacre in 2010
- Born: Edward Earl Whitacre Jr. November 4, 1941 (age 85); Ennis, Texas, U.S.
- Education: Texas Tech University BSE
- Occupations: business executive and consultant
- Known for: leadership of Southwestern Bell Corporation/AT&T Inc., and General Motors
- Political party: Republican

Edward Earl Whitacre Jr. (born November 4, 1941) is the former chairman and CEO of General Motors. He is also a former chairman of the board and chief executive officer of AT&T, previously Southwestern Bell Corporation (SBC). He served as national president of the Boy Scouts of America from 1998 to 2000. On September 1, 2010, Whitacre stepped down as CEO, and retired as chairman of the board by the end of 2010.

== Early life and education ==
Whitacre was born in Ennis, Texas on November 4, 1941. He graduated from Texas Tech University with a bachelor's degree in industrial engineering and is a member of the Delta Tau Delta fraternity.

He began his career with Southwestern Bell in 1963 as a facility engineer.

== Business career ==
In October 1988, Whitacre became president and chief operating officer of a regional bell operating company, Southwestern Bell Corporation. Two years later, Whitacre became chairman of the board and chief executive officer. In 1995, Southwestern Bell Corporation changed its name to SBC Communications. Whitacre led SBC through a series of mergers and acquisitions in building the largest provider of both local long distance telephone services and wireless service (through its Cingular division) in the United States. These acquisitions included Pacific Telesis (1997), SNET (1998), Comcast Cellular (1999), Ameritech (1999) and AT&T Corporation (2005), from which the post-merger company took its name, as well as the 2006 acquisition of Bell South.

On June 23, 2006, he and the CEO of BellSouth were brought in under the Senate Antitrust Subcommittee following the AT&T-BellSouth merger. Whitacre was questioned regarding possible customer information leaks to the NSA in the interest of national security. There had been allegations by former AT&T technician Mark Klein that such work had been done in Room 641A of the San Francisco offices.

Whitacre's compensation totaled $61 million in 2006, $17 million in 2005, and about $14 million in 2004.

In 2006, Whitacre famously declared that companies like Google, Yahoo! or Vonage should not be able to “use the pipes for free.”

On April 27, 2007, at the AT&T annual stockholders meeting, Whitacre announced his intent to retire as chief executive officer and chairman of the board, effective June 3. The board of directors elected Randall Stephenson to succeed Whitacre as new CEO and chairman. Whitacre retired on June 4, 2007, with Randall Stephenson taking over the following morning. Upon retirement, Whitacre was eligible for a $158 million payout from AT&T. Following retirement, under his employment contract, Whitacre was entitled to receive some continuing benefits, including automobile use, access to AT&T's corporate aircraft for up to ten hours per month, use of AT&T office facilities and support staff, home security, and club memberships, as well as payment of applicable taxes resulting from these benefits, except for use of the aircraft. In addition, Whitacre has a three-year consulting contract with AT&T for which he is paid about $1 million annually. It has been reported that during his tenure at AT&T, Whitacre offered Randall Stephenson three words of advice via text message when the executive change was announced: "Give 'em hell".

BusinessWeek (1999) reported that, although the CEO of AT&T — amongst the largest and most influential names in telecommunications and its surrounding technology, Whitacre did not use e-mail or have a computer at his office.

As General Motors chairman and interim CEO, Whitacre does have a computer at his office and prefers to answer e-mail via BlackBerry.

In May 2008, Whitacre was elected to the board of directors for ExxonMobil.

On June 9, 2009, General Motors named Whitacre as chairman. He took the position when the automaker emerged from bankruptcy proceedings on July 10, 2009. On December 1, 2009, Whitacre became interim CEO following Fritz Henderson's resignation. Since taking the helms, he has been dubbed the GM Reaper by many in blogs, noted for his strong desire to "kill off" brands and projects, such as Saab and a sub-Volt Toyota Prius competitor planned for Chevrolet. In January 2010, chairman Whitacre was appointed permanent CEO after serving in the post in an interim capacity. On September 1, 2010 he relinquished the CEO position to Daniel Akerson but agreed to continue on as GM Chairman to the end of the year.

In February 2014 it was announced that he will deliver the Spring Commencement address for University of the Pacific's Stockton campus on May 10, 2014 at Alex G. Spanos Center.

He continues to live in San Antonio, but frequently travels to Detroit.

== Honors ==
In 1997, Whitacre received the Golden Plate Award of the American Academy of Achievement. His Golden Plate was presented by Awards Council member Carlos Slim.

AT&T headquarters in downtown Dallas was dubbed "Whitacre Tower" in honor of Whitacre's 44 years at the company, 17 of which were spent as chairman and CEO.

In 2004, he was awarded an honorary doctorate degree by the University of the Incarnate Word.

On November 12, 2008, Texas Tech announced that its college of engineering will be renamed the Edward E. Whitacre Jr. College of Engineering. In 2007, AT&T created an award called the "Whitacre Award" to honor the former chairman.

Whitacre was inducted into the Junior Achievement U.S. Business Hall of Fame in 2009.

In 2010, Whitacre was named as a finalist for Texan of the Year.

In 2023, Whitacre was inducted into the Wireless Hall of Fame for his contributions to the cellular industry.

== Book ==
- American Turnaround: Reinventing AT&T and GM and the Way We Do Business in the USA. 2013. ISBN 1455513016

Boy Scouts of America
Preceded by John W. Creighton Jr.	National president 1998–2000	Succeeded by Milton H. Ward
Business positions
Preceded by Zane E. Barnes	Chairman of Southwestern Bell; 1990–1995	Company name changed to SBC Communications
Preceded by Zane E. Barnes	Chief Executive Officer of Southwestern Bell; 1990–1995	Company name changed to SBC Communications
New title	President of SBC Communications; 1995–2005	Company name changed to AT&T Inc.
New title	Chief Executive Officer of SBC Communications; 1995–2005	Company name changed to AT&T Inc.
Preceded by David Dorman as Chairman and Chief Executive Officer of AT&T Corporation	Chairman of AT&T Inc. 2005–2007	Succeeded by Randall L. Stephenson
Preceded by David Dorman as Chairman and Chief Executive Officer of AT&T Corporation	Chief Executive Officer of AT&T Inc. 2005–2007	Succeeded by Randall L. Stephenson
Preceded by Kent Kresa	Chairman of General Motors; 2009 - 2010	Succeeded by Daniel Akerson
Preceded by Frederick Henderson	Chief Executive Officer of General Motors; 2009 - 2010	Succeeded by Daniel Akerson
