= Frederic G. Donner =

American businessman (1902–1987)

Frederic G. Donnner
- Portrait of Frederic G. Donner, 1962.
- Born: Frederic Garrett Donner; October 4, 1902; Three Oaks, Michigan, U.S.
- Died: February 28, 1987 (aged 84); Greenwich, Connecticut
- Education: University of Michigan

Frederic Garrett Donner (October 4, 1902 – February 28, 1987) was an American chairman and CEO of the General Motors Corporation from September 1, 1958, to October 31, 1967.

== Early life ==
Frederic G. Donner was born in Three Oaks Michigan, the son of an accountant, on October 4, 1902. He graduated from the University of Michigan with a degree in economics and worked briefly for a Chicago accounting firm.

== Career ==
He joined General Motors's New York staff as an accountant in 1926, and worked there for 32 years. He became assistant treasurer in 1934 and in 1941, at 38, he became one of the youngest GM executives ever to reach a vice-presidency. In 1956 he was named executive vice president for finance. He served as an officer of General Motors from 1941 until 1958, when he became chairman and chief executive officer. Donner presided over a major reorganization of GM's board of directors to include more representation from outside the corporation. During his tenure GM achieved record sales and profits.

He was at the helm when GM expanded its product line with 12 new passenger cars, including the Nova, Chevelle, Firebird, Century, Riviera, Camaro, Pontiac LeMans, Cutlass, and Eldorado.

Donner was the author of The worldwide industrial enterprise; its challenge and promise.

Donner was inducted into the Automotive Hall of Fame in 1994.

== Personal life ==
Donner died on February 28, 1987 in Greenwich, Connecticut.

Business positions
Preceded by Albert Bradley	Chairman of General Motors; 1958 – 1967	Succeeded by James Roche
Preceded by Harlow Curtice	CEO of General Motors; 1958 – 1967	Succeeded by James Roche
