= George E. Daniels =

American automobile industry executive (1875 – 1954)

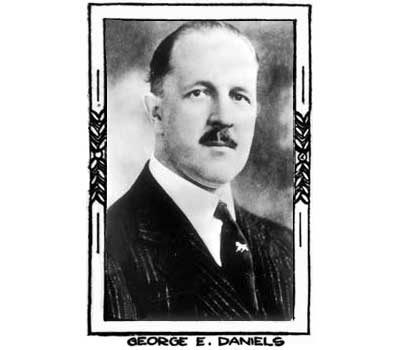
- Daniels in 1914
- Born: April 17, 1875; Franklin, Massachusetts, U.S.
- Died: March 24, 1954 (aged 78); Danbury, Connecticut, U.S.
- Known for: First president of General Motors; Founder of the Daniels Motor Company
- Spouse(s): Teresa Holmes (1906-?); Marion (Philips) Hart (m. 1912)
- Children: 1

George Emery Daniels (April 17, 1875 – March 24, 1954) was an American automobile industry executive who was the founder of Daniels Motor Company.

== Early life ==
Daniels was born in Franklin, Massachusetts on April 17, 1875, to Mancy M. and Mary E. Daniels. In 1898, he graduated from Tufts College, where he played tackle for the school's football team. In 1901 he graduated from Harvard Law School. He practiced law in Massachusetts and New York for eight years before entering the automobile industry.

== Personal life ==
On February 20, 1906, Daniels married Teresa Holmes in the chantry of Grace Church. Rev. William Reed Huntington performed the ceremony. On August 2, 1912, Daniels married Marion (Philips) Hart, ex-wife of Charles Henry Hart, in Philadelphia. They had one son, George Emery Daniels Jr.

== Career ==
=== General Motors ===
In 1908, Buick owner William C. Durant engaged attorney Curtis R. Hathaway to draw up articles of incorporation for General Motors. On September 15, 1908, the certificate of incorporation was signed by Hathaway, Daniels, and Benjamin Marcuse. On September 22, Daniels was chosen to be president of the new corporation. Soon thereafter, GM purchased Buick. On October 20, 1908, the GM's bylaws were changed and a new board of directors and group of officers were elected. Daniels chose to remain with GM as the manager of Buick's Philadelphia branch. In 1910, he was named vice president and general manager of another GM division, the Oakland Motor Car Company. During his four years in charge of Oakland, Daniels was able to double the company's sales from $500,000 a year to $1 million. He left Oakland in 1914.

=== Daniels Motor Company ===
In 1915, Daniels organized the Daniels Motor Company to construct luxury eight-cylinder, closed-body vehicles that were close to custom made. In 1920, due to increased business, the Daniels Motor Company underwent a major restructuring. It acquired the Keystone Vehicle Works, which had manufactured bodies for Daniels. The reorganized Daniels company relocated to the Keystone factory, which it planned on expanding. The company also announced plans for a new $500,000 factory on a six-acre site in Fox Chase, Philadelphia. The company spent too much on raw materials and equipping its factory to remain profitable and on January 19, 1923, with $840,000 in liabilities, the Daniels Motor Car Company went into receivership. The company's assets were sold off the following year.

=== Later career ===
From 1924 to 1929, Daniels was vice president and general manager of the Locomobile Company of America, a subsidiary of his former GM boss William C. Durant's Durant Motors. In 1934, he was elected to the board of directors of the Munson Steamship Line.

== Later life ==
After leaving Locomobile, Daniels returned to the practice of law. He had an office in New York City until the early 1950s, when he moved to Danbury, Connecticut. He died on March 24, 1954, at Danbury Hospital.

Business positions
Preceded by Position created	President of General Motors; September 22, 1908–October 20, 1908	Succeeded by William M. Eaton
