= James Roche (General Motors) =

James M. Roche
- Born: James Michael Roche; December 16, 1906; Elgin, Illinois, U.S.
- Died: June 6, 2004 (aged 97); Belleair, Florida, U.S.
- Occupations: statistician, automobile company executive
- Known for: Chairman and CEO of General Motors

James Michael Roche (December 16, 1906 – June 6, 2004) was an American statistician who served as the Chief Executive Officer (CEO) and Chairman of the Board at General Motors Corporation. He is credited for promoting racial equality within General Motors (GM).

== Early life and background ==
Roche was born in Elgin, Illinois. He married Louise McMillan in 1929 and eventually had a daughter and two sons, James Roche, Doug Roche and Joan Roche. Roche never went to college because of his father's early death. He was one of the few American industrialists lacking a college education.

== General Motors career ==
He joined GM as a statistician in 1927 in the Chicago sales and service branch and slowly worked his way up through the ranks, becoming president of the corporation in 1965. Most of his career was spent at the Cadillac Division, becoming head of the division in 1957. Roche became vice-president of General Motors in 1957, and executive vice-president and board member in 1962.

=== Involvement in equal opportunity and other controversies at GM ===
Roche is cited as dedicating General Motors and himself personally to ensuring equal employment opportunities. In 1971, he offered Rev. Leon Sullivan, a Philadelphia minister active in the civil rights movement, a seat on the GM board - GM's first black board member. Sullivan later sought to have GM and other corporations leave South Africa in protest of the country's apartheid policies.

In 1966, Roche issued an apology for the company's efforts to discredit consumer activist Ralph Nader after Nader published the book Unsafe at Any Speed, which criticized the GM-built Corvair as being unsafe.

During Roche's tenure, public opinion about automobile companies was changing from praise for producing cars which allowed freedom and mobility to dissatisfaction.

=== Chairman and Chairman of the Board ===
Roche served as Chairman of GM from June 1, 1965, to October 31, 1967, and as Chairman of the Board of Directors from November 1, 1967, to December 31, 1971. He retired in 1971 because of a mandatory retirement age.

== Other career achievements ==
Roche served on the board of directors of PepsiCo, Jack Eckerd Corp., the New York Stock Exchange and other entities. After retirement he served several years as chairman of the National Committee for Employer Support of the Guard and Reserve. He also volunteered in many community development programs, mostly in Detroit. Roche was quoted as saying in 1987, "Anybody who achieves a top position in an organization owes a debt of some kind,... If you have a talent and you have your health, you should help others."

Roche is an inductee to the Automotive Hall of Fame. Ten colleges and universities awarded him honorary degrees.

Time magazine called Roche "a folksy sort who never shows his temper and whose greatest failing, according to companions and competitors alike, is that 'he may be too much of a gentleman.' "

== Death ==
Roche died on June 6, 2004 in his home in Belleair, Florida at the age of 97.

Business positions
Preceded by Frederic G. Donner	Chairman of General Motors; 1967–1971	Succeeded by Richard C. Gerstenberg
Preceded by Frederic G. Donner	CEO of General Motors; 1967 – 1971	Succeeded by Richard C. Gerstenberg
Preceded by John F. Gordon	President of General Motors; 1965–1967	Succeeded by Edward N. Cole
