= Rick Wagoner =

American businessman (born 1953)

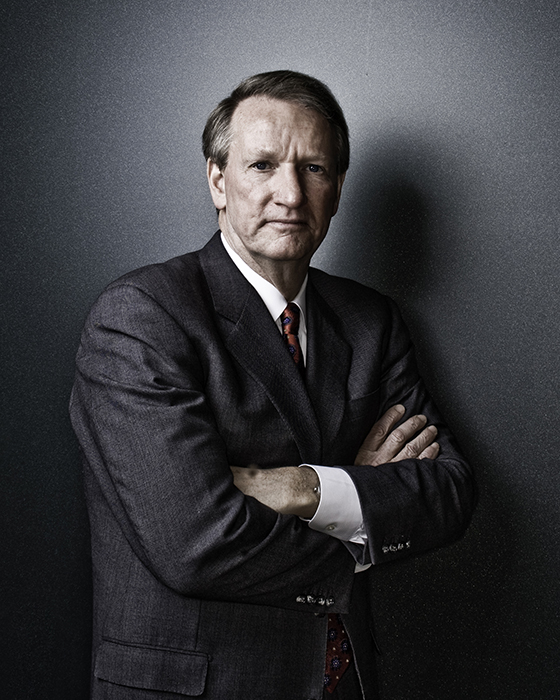
- Wagoner in 2008
- Born: George Richard Wagoner Jr. February 9, 1953 (age 73); Wilmington, Delaware, US
- Education: Duke University (BA); Harvard University (MBA)
- Occupations: Businessman; Formerly chairman & CEO of General Motors (2000–2009)
- Predecessor: John F. Smith Jr.

George Richard Wagoner Jr. (born February 9, 1953) is an American businessman and former chair and chief executive officer of General Motors. Wagoner resigned on March 29, 2009, at the request of the White House. The latter part of Wagoner's tenure as CEO found him under heavy criticism as the market valuation of GM went down by more than 90% and the company lost more than US$82 billion. He is a board member of ChargePoint, an electric vehicle infrastructure company.

== Family and education ==
Wagoner was born in Wilmington, Delaware and grew up in Richmond, Virginia. He graduated from John Randolph Tucker High School there, where he was named "Best All Around" student in his graduating class. He received a BA in Economics from Duke University in 1975. He then attended Harvard Business School, from which he received an MBA in 1977. He is married and has three adult sons.

While at Duke, he became a member of the Delta Tau Delta fraternity. Wagoner is a member of the boards of trustees of Duke University, Detroit Country Day School, the Board of Dean's Advisors of the Harvard Business School, and the board of directors of Catalyst. He is a member of The Business Council, The Business Roundtable, Detroit Renaissance Executive Committee, and the Secretary of Energy Advisory Board.

== General Motors ==
After Harvard, he joined GM as an analyst in the treasurer's office. In 1981, he became treasurer of GM's Brazil subsidiary and later served as managing director.

In 1992, he was named GM's chief financial officer, in 1994 he became executive vice president and/or president of North American Operations, and in 1998 he was named president and chief operating officer.

After GM lost $30 billion during a single three-year stretch in the early 1990s, Wagoner and chairman John F. "Jack" Smith Jr. forced GM "back to basics" to battle "30 years of management mistakes" that left him with little room to maneuver.

=== Chief Executive Officer ===
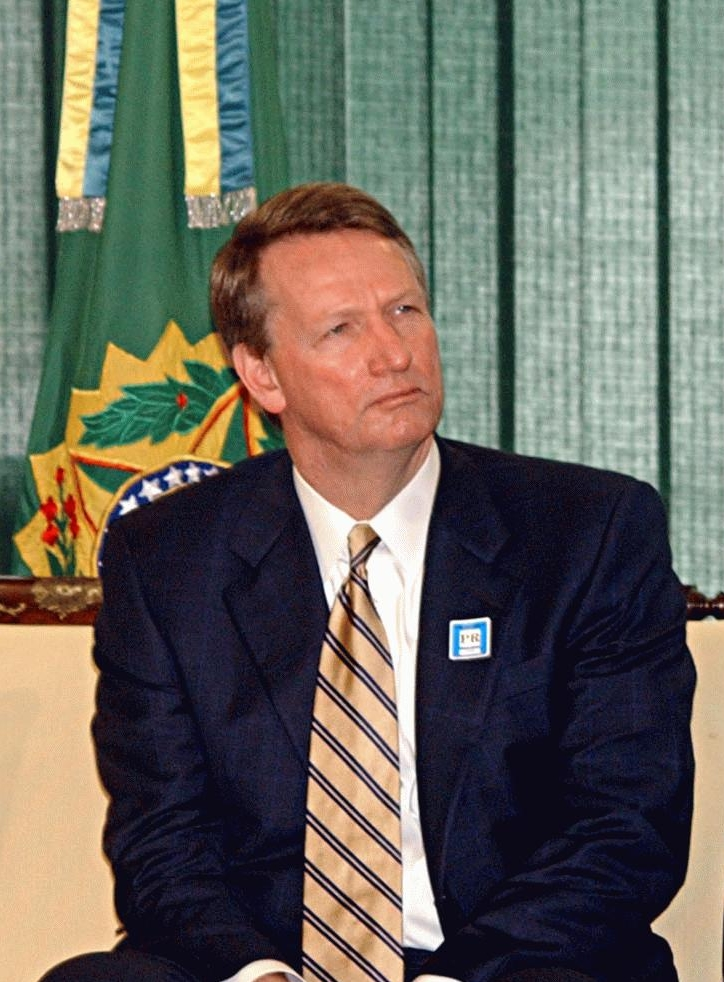
Wagoner in 2004

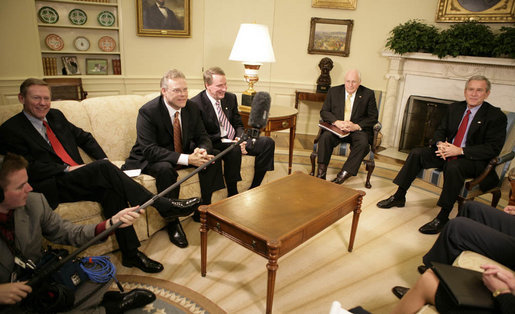
Wagoner with President George W. Bush, Vice President Dick Cheney, Ford CEO Alan Mulally, and Chrysler CEO Tom LaSorda in 2006

Wagoner became president and Chief Executive Officer in June 2000 and was elected chairman on May 1, 2003. Under his leadership, GM suffered more than $85 billion in losses.

In an interview, Wagoner stated that the worst decision of his tenure at GM was "axing the EV1 electric car program and not putting the right resources into hybrids. "It didn't affect profitability," Wagoner claimed, "but it did affect image".

In April 2005, Wagoner took back personal control of GM's North American car division from GM North American chairman Bob Lutz and GM North American President Gary Cowger in light of its poor performance. In early June 2005, Wagoner announced that GM in the United States would close several plants and shed 25,000 employees (17% of GM's U.S. workforce) by 2008. The cuts will result in GM production reducing output by one million cars and trucks (from 6 million to 5 million).

In the Automotive industry crisis of 2008–10, Wagoner came under renewed pressure as GM sought financial support from the U.S. government in an attempt to avoid bankruptcy. During the latter half of 2008, Wagoner and GM maintained that bankruptcy was "not an option that GM is considering," despite rapidly running out of capital. This stance was called "presumptuous" by some observers. Within 9 months, GM was to declare bankruptcy.

During hearings for government loans to the Big Three Automakers, Wagoner, Alan Mulally and Robert Nardelli were criticized for flying to Washington, D.C. in corporate jets. For a subsequent meeting, the three CEOs drove from Detroit to Washington by hybrid cars.

The BBC reported that Wagoner was popular among GM employees and reporters. However, it cites that he lacked the "ruthless streak needed to make the tough decisions required to bring GM back from the brink of bankruptcy." While analysts have praised Wagoner for operational improvements, cost-cutting moves and an increased focus on vehicle quality, with the appointment of Bob Lutz to oversee product execution, others criticized him for his incremental approach to change, largely as he resisted making the drastic cuts demanded by the US government. Throughout the first months of 2009, Wagoner argued that a bankruptcy would be more costly than a government bailout. However, there remained lingering doubts that he was implementing the restructuring moves necessary to remain viable in the future without further government loans.

On March 29, 2009, Wagoner agreed to immediately resign his position as GM chairman and CEO, as part of the Obama administration deal to provide GM with further short-term financing. The following day, the US government rejected GM's initial restructuring plan and gave the company 60 days to come with a new proposal or be forced into bankruptcy. He was replaced as CEO by Fritz Henderson, who had been serving as GM's President and chief operating officer.

After 32 years at GM, Wagoner retired with an exit package of over $10 million: $1.65 million in benefits per year for his first five years of retirement, $74,030 per year pension for the rest of his life, and a $2.6 million life insurance policy that can be cashed out at any time.

In 2017, Wagoner was appointed a director at ChargePoint Inc., a Silicon Valley company that makes electric-vehicle charging stations.

In 2018, Wagoner made an investment into YourMechanic, a Silicon Valley startup which connects owners with a group of certified mechanics, currently offering more than 800 repair services.

== See also ==
- Automotive industry crisis of 2008–2009
- General Motors Chapter 11 reorganization

Business positions
Preceded by John F. Smith Jr.	Chairman of General Motors; 2003–2009	Succeeded by Kent Kresa
Preceded by John F. Smith Jr.	CEO of General Motors; 2000–2009	Succeeded by Frederick Henderson
Preceded by John F. Smith Jr.	President of General Motors; 1998–2008	Succeeded by Frederick Henderson
