= John F. Smith Jr. =

American businessman and executive (born 1938)

John Francis "Jack" Smith Jr. (born April 6, 1938) is an American businessman and executive who was COO in 1992, CEO from 1992 to 2000 and then chairman of General Motors from 1996 to 2003.

He later was non-executive chairman of Delta Air Lines from 2004 to 2007, and a member of the board of Procter & Gamble from 1995 to 2008, and also Suzuki Motor Corporation.

== Early life and education ==
Smith was born in Worcester, Massachusetts.

He graduated from Saint John's High School in Shrewsbury, Massachusetts and later received his Bachelor of Business Administration from the University of Massachusetts Amherst in 1960 and his Master of Business Administration from Boston University in 1965. While at the University of Massachusetts Amherst he was initiated into the Kappa Sigma fraternity.

== Career ==
He joined General Motors as a payroll auditor in 1961, moving to its financial group in New York City in 1966. He went on to hold positions ranging from director of international planning to president of GM Canada, president of GM Europe and head of international operations.

As CEO of GM, he undertook one of its most sweeping reorganizations, overturning a cumbersome and inefficient structure created in the 1920s by Alfred P. Sloan and left virtually unchanged since then. Starting with purchasing in 1992 and ending with engineering in 2003, he brought together separate overlapping functions related to the various divisions that formed the company, while also expanding operations into Asia. In this transformation, which included terminating the Oldsmobile brand, over 90% of core management positions were eliminated, corporate decision-making became faster and easier, production efficiencies and quality improved by spreading the lean manufacturing Toyota Production System from NUMMI, and, above all, the bottom line went from near-bankruptcy losses to decent profits. After he relinquished the CEO position in 2000 to his personally selected successor, Rick Wagoner, he continued on as chairman to see his plan fully executed.

Along with his chairmanship of Delta, Smith is a director of several other entities, including Procter & Gamble and The Nature Conservancy. Smith is a trustee of Boston University.

Business positions
Preceded by John G. Smale	Chairman of General Motors; 1996–2003	Succeeded by Rick Wagoner
Preceded by Robert C. Stempel	CEO of General Motors; 1992–2000	Succeeded by Rick Wagoner
Preceded by Lloyd E. Reuss	President of General Motors; 1992–1998	Succeeded by Rick Wagoner
