= William M. Eaton =

American business executive (1856 – 1923

President of General Motors
- In office October 20, 1908 – November 23, 1910
- Preceded by: George E. Daniels
- Succeeded by: James J. Storrow

Personal details
- Born: William M. Eaton; July 23, 1856 Cambridge, Ohio, U.S.
- Died: September 29, 1923 (aged 67) Jackson, Michigan, U.S.
- Children: 2

William M. Eaton (July 23, 1856 – September 29, 1923) was an American business executive who managed various utility companies and was the second president of General Motors.

== Early life ==
Eaton was born in Cambridge, Ohio on July 23, 1856. In 1872 he moved to Jackson, Michigan, where his father started a pottery business.

== Career ==
After a year and a half in school, Eaton went to work for his father. In 1880, he joined the Jackson Furniture Company as an accountant and timekeeper. From 1882 to 1885 he worked for Holden and Tinker and the D. A. Tinker Company. He then spent two years with the Bennett Clay Machinery Company.

In 1887, Eaton was named superintendent of the Jackson Gas Light Company. In 1903, he joined the Grand Rapids Gas Light Company as vice president and general manager. The following year he moved to Rochester, New York, where he was vice president and general manager of the newly-formed Rochester Railway and Light Company. From 1907 to 1914, Eaton worked for Hoodenpyle, Hardy & Co. of New York City, where he was a member of the operating committee for Commonwealth Power, Railway, and Light Company's electric and gas properties and worked on hydropower projects on the Au Sable and Muskegon Rivers.

On October 10, 1908, Eaton was elected president of General Motors. He handled administrative work while company founder William C. Durant worked on acquiring more automotive companies. In 1910, GM was taken over by a group of financiers, who installed a new management team led by James J. Storrow.

== Later life ==
In 1914, Jackson retired to Jackson, where he was active in community affairs. He served as president of the board that developed Ella Sharp Park and was a director of several local businesses. He died on September 29, 1923, at his home in Jackson.
