= RACER Trust =

Revitalizing Auto Communities Environmental Response Trust
- Type: Trust
- Industry: Environmental remediation and real estate
- Predecessor: Motors Liquidation Company
- Founded: March 31, 2011; 15 years ago
- Headquarters: Detroit, Michigan, United States
- Key people: Elliott P. Laws (Trustee)
- Website: racertrust.org

The RACER Trust (Revitalizing Auto Communities Environmental Response Trust) was created in March 2011 by a consent decree in the United States Bankruptcy Court for the Southern District of New York to clean up and position for redevelopment certain real properties owned by the former General Motors Corporation (“GMC”) and various GMC affiliates at the time of GMC's bankruptcy in 2009.

Through its bankruptcy proceeding, GMC became known as Motors Liquidation Company ("MLC") and has since been effectively dissolved. Before its dissolution, MLC was carved into five separate trusts; the first to settle the claims of unsecured creditors (General Unsecured Creditors Trust); the second (RACER) to manage, perform environmental activities at, and ultimately dispose of certain remaining MLC real and personal property assets; the third to manage asbestos-related claims (Asbestos Personal Injury Trust); the fourth for litigation claims (Action Avoidance Trust); and the fifth for general unresolved GMC matters (MLC Debtor In Possession Lenders Trust).

At its inception, RACER's portfolio included properties at 89 locations in 14 states, comprising 358 individual parcels and more than 7,000 acres of primarily industrial land, making RACER one of the largest holders of industrial property in the United States. When it was formed, RACER was the largest environmental response and remediation trust in U.S. history.

RACER is headquartered in Detroit, Michigan. Its administrative trustee is EPLET, LLC, the managing member of which is Elliott P. Laws, a former assistant administrator of the U.S. Environmental Protection Agency's Office of Solid Waste and Emergency Response and a partner in the law firm Crowell & Moring. The Bankruptcy Court appointed EPLET, LLC to a five-year term as administrative trustee when RACER was established in 2011; EPLET, LLC was then reappointed to a second term in 2016 and a third term in 2021.

The Settlement Agreement assigns RACER two general roles regarding the former GMC properties in the RACER portfolio. First, RACER manages these properties while under RACER ownership and performs certain environmental cleanup of them where needed, even in some cases after RACER is no longer the owner. Second, RACER seeks to sell or transfer the properties for productive or beneficial reuse.

RACER is not a government entity but rather an independent trust with the United States of America as its sole beneficiary.

== Background ==
On June 1, 2009, General Motors Corporation filed for Chapter 11 bankruptcy protection in the United States Bankruptcy Court for the Southern District of New York. On October 9, 2009, Remediation and Liability Management Company, Inc. (“REALM”) and Environmental Corporate Remediation Company, Inc. (“ENCORE”) each filed voluntary petitions for relief under Chapter 11.

On July 5, 2009, the bankruptcy court approved the sale of the old GMC's good assets to a new General Motors Company (“New GM”). Following the sale of assets, the old GMC was renamed Motors Liquidation Company (“MLC”). The new GM did not purchase all plant locations, and most that remained with MLC were transferred to the RACER Trust for environmental remediation in preparation for sale or transfer.

Parties to the consent decree and settlement agreement that established the RACER Trust included MLC, REALM, and ENCORE (collectively the “debtors”); the United States of America; the states of Delaware, Illinois, Indiana, Kansas, Michigan, Missouri, New Jersey, New York, Ohio, Virginia and Wisconsin; the Louisiana Department of Environmental Quality, the Massachusetts Department of Environmental Protection; and the Department of Environmental Protection for the Commonwealth of Pennsylvania (collectively the “States”); the Saint Regis Mohawk Tribe; and EPLET, LLC, in its capacity as administrative trustee.

== Properties ==
MLC's portfolio included properties at 89 locations in 14 U.S. states. These properties totaled more than 7,100 acres (2,900 ha) of land and nearly 40,000,000 square feet (3,700,000 m^{2}) of structural area. By the time MLC's assets were transferred to RACER Trust, MLC had sold six properties outright and a portion of a seventh. While RACER Trust was conveyed the remaining properties, it was transferred the environmental cleanup and monitoring responsibilities of all properties that required environmental remediation and long-term monitoring, regardless of whether the property had changed ownership. Sixty of the properties carried environmental obligations, including four sold by MLC prior to RACER Trust's creation.

== Environmental mission ==
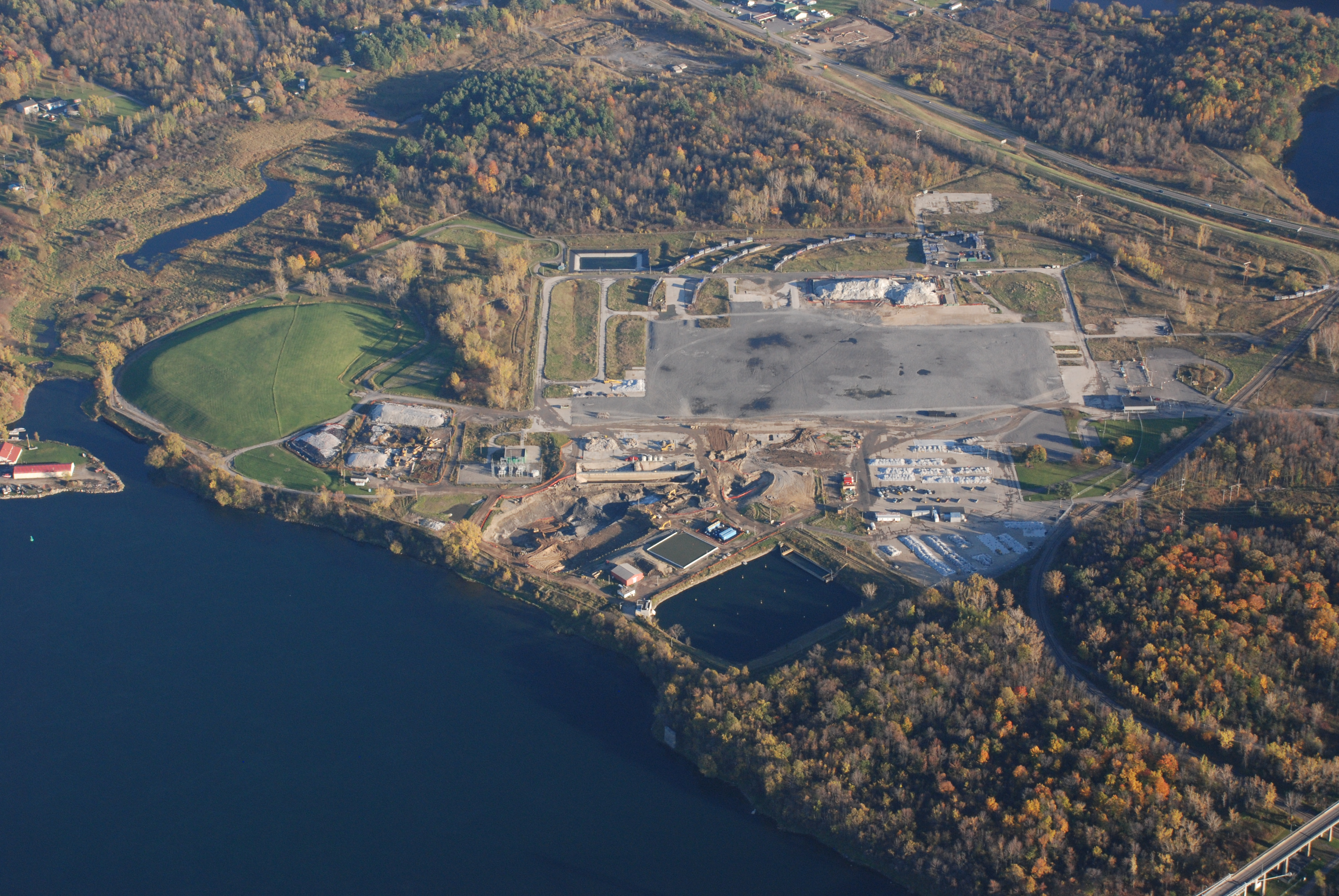
Active remediation at RACER's Massena, New York site, the former Massena Castings Plant, in 2013

RACER Trust is responsible for conducting safe, effective cleanups of legacy environmental contamination resulting from previous operations at 60 former GM locations. The cleanups are conducted with the approval and oversight of state and federal regulatory agencies and funded by the principal and investment income from nearly $500 million that RACER received from the U.S. Department of the Treasury at the time of RACER's establishment. RACER's goal is to obtain "No Further Action" letters or other such instruments of completion from responsible regulatory agencies for all locations where cleanups were required.

To the extent possible, RACER coordinates its cleanups to accommodate the interests of buyers or end users who seek to invest in new industrial or commercial development and job creation. In most cases, RACER properties can be sold for new uses even before environmental cleanups are started or completed, assuming RACER is guaranteed continuing access to the properties to conduct cleanup work.

Budgets for each cleanup were incorporated into the settlement agreement that established RACER Trust. In cases where the established budget is insufficient, RACER Trust has access to supplemental funding with the approval of the signatories to the settlement agreement.

== Redevelopment mission ==
RACER begins the redevelopment process for new job-creating uses by meeting with local elected officials, community leaders and economic development organizations, with a goal of understanding the local community's common vision for the optimal re-use of each location. Based on this common vision, RACER determines how best to market the property for sale to prospective buyers. Following these initial steps, RACER published detailed marketing brochures and documents describing the terms for purchase, formally opening the marketing process.

Offers for purchase are evaluated by RACER against six criteria set forth in the Settlement Agreement that resulted in RACER's creation. RACER also may consider additional factors, in its sole discretion, when assessing whether these criteria have been best satisfied by a particular offer. While purchase price will be evaluated, RACER also must consider each offer's ability to create jobs and generate new economic opportunity in the communities hurt by the GM bankruptcy.

RACER strongly prefers buyers who have a specific plan to create new jobs in those properties while reusing, improving and expanding existing buildings, rather than buyers who intend to dismantle buildings and sell components of the properties they have purchased.

Proceeds from property sales or leases are used to pay so-called holding costs at RACER sites, including the property taxes RACER pays on these properties, and maintenance, insurance and security expenses. Proceeds from the sale or lease of RACER properties are transferred to RACER's Administrative Funding Account, from which RACER pays its day-to-day expenses. RACER is self-sustaining, and the anticipated proceeds from the sale or lease of properties were factored into the ongoing operations of RACER at the time of its creation. Thus, donation of property as a redevelopment strategy is precluded.

RACER does not invest directly in redevelopment (for example, by providing funding to offset infrastructure improvement costs) or otherwise pay third-party expenses (for example, for consultants to evaluate redevelopment proposals). RACER invests in local communities by maintaining properties in a marketable condition, paying property taxes and acting as an economic development partner in pursuit of new investment and job creation.

=== Sales criteria ===
RACER is obligated by terms of the Settlement Agreement to sell its properties at prices that approximate fair market value and that take into consideration the jobs and other economic benefits new projects can bring to auto communities hurt by the GM bankruptcy.

The Settlement Agreement described the criteria that RACER, at a minimum, must consider when selling properties. These criteria include:

1. Whether the purchase price is sufficient
2. The potential for job creation in the affected community and the state
3. Increases in tax revenue or other benefits, like the reduction of blight, to the community, state or Tribe
4. Avoiding an unanticipated increase in costs for the environmental cleanup
5. The views of the local communities, the Tribe or the state
6. The reputation and credibility of the prospective purchaser.

The Settlement Agreement does not require any particular weighting of the factors. Although the effects of a proposed sale on the states and localities are to be considered — and are considered — by RACER, these entities are not beneficiaries of RACER. Its sole beneficiary is the United States Government.

== Notable sales ==
=== Moraine, Ohio ===
RACER sold two of its properties, Moraine Industrial Land and Moraine Assembly Plant, to Industrial Realty Group (IRG) in June 2011. The adjacent sites totaled more than 3.3 million square feet of factory space on 379 acres of land in Moraine and Kettering, Ohio. In one of the largest international deals in Ohio's history, Fuyao Glass America purchased 1.5 million square feet of manufacturing space from IRG. The company, now the largest auto glass manufacturer in the world, supplies customers such as General Motors, Ford, and Honda. The plant also serves after-market glass suppliers, which includes companies such as Safelite AutoGlass.

Fuyao originally pledged $230 million in investment and the creation of 800 jobs. One year later this jumped to $360 million in investment and 1,550 jobs. One year after that, Fuyao announced its labor need had risen to a total of 2,400 workers at this facility. A total of 622 temporary construction jobs also were created. In July 2016, Fuyao announced it is leasing an additional 241,000 square feet of the plant in a 15-year agreement with IRG. Fuyao's chairman, Cho Tak Wong, said it expects to have more than 3,000 employees at this site sometime in the future. IRG leases portions of the sites to other auto- and non-auto related manufacturers.

=== Kansas City, Kansas ===
In September 2013, RACER sold its 74-acre Kansas City, Kansas holdings to NorthPoint Development. The buyer named the site Central Industrial Park and prepared it for new industrial development. In 2015, NorthPoint developed a 74,000 square-foot, $10 million build-to-suit facility that was purchased by Plastic Omnium Auto Inergy, which manufactures plastic fuel tank systems for the nearby General Motors Fairfax Assembly Plant. The manufacturer employs approximately 200 new workers. NorthPoint then constructed an 842,000 square-foot speculative building that General Motors Company occupies under a long-term lease. This $55 million development now employs approximately 500 new workers. Additional areas of the site are planned for redevelopment.

=== Pontiac, Michigan ===
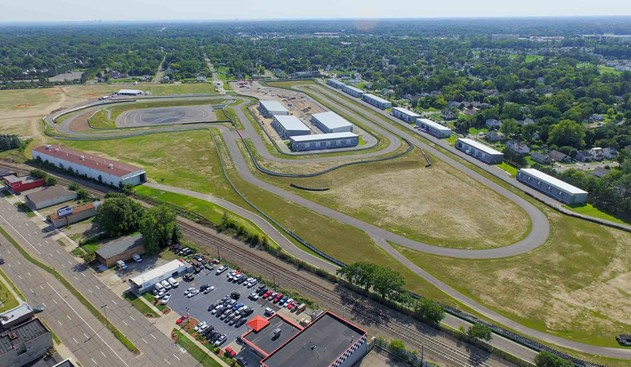
M1 Concourse in 2016

In August 2014, RACER sold two of its Pontiac, Michigan properties, PCC Validation I and PCC Validation II, to M1 Concourse, LLC. The two adjacent sites comprised 86 acres of vacant land once owned by the Rapid Motor Vehicle Company until being acquired by Old GM in 1909. The buyer built an exclusive community of more than 250 secure private garages set along the 1.5-mile Champion Motor Speedway, also part of the M1 Concourse development. Private garages are individually owned flexible storage and entertainment spaces. A 6,000 square-foot entertainment venue, a restaurant and banquet/event center, and commercial/retail spaces were part of the nearly $70 million investment.

RACER sold its 3.6-acre commercial lot in downtown Pontiac to George W. Auch Company in 2017, which was relocating its construction business headquarters. The 20,000 sq. ft., LEED-certified hub was completed in 2018. Approximately 50 employees moved to the new office space.

United Wholesale Mortgage is one of largest wholesale mortgage lending companies in the United States. From 2018 to 2021, the firm purchased all or portions of five former RACER properties in Pontiac, including the 1.2 million sq. ft. Pontiac Centerpoint Campus – Central. While retrofitting the facility to house thousands of new UWM employees, a massive skywalk was constructed to connect the property with UWM’s headquarters to the north of South Boulevard. It is estimated that more than UWM now employs more than 9,000 workers throughout Pontiac.

=== Indianapolis, Indiana ===
RACER sold its 103-acre Indianapolis Stamping Plant site in Indianapolis, Indiana to the Ambrose Property Group in March 2018. The property was once home to the 2.2-million square-foot General Motors Indianapolis Metals Center. RACER razed the vast majority of the structures on site prior to selling to Ambrose. Ambrose's site plan included a mixed-use development along the White River that could require some 1,000 temporary construction jobs, 900 permanent jobs, and more than $500 million in project investments over 10 to 15 years. The City of Indianapolis did not perform under the project agreement and consequently Ambrose abandoned these plans and listed the property for sale. In September 2019, Ambrose sold 12 acres of the property to the neighboring Indianapolis Zoo. In November 2020, Ambrose sold the remaining 91 acres of the property to the Indiana Economic Development Corporation (IEDC). Soon thereafter, the state announced Elanco Animal Health would be relocating its global headquarters to a 45-acre portion of the site through a total incentive package worth as much as $150.5 million. In March 2022, the IEDC announced that it plans to transition 20 additional acres into a mixed-use development including residential, retail and office spaces.

=== Livonia, Michigan ===
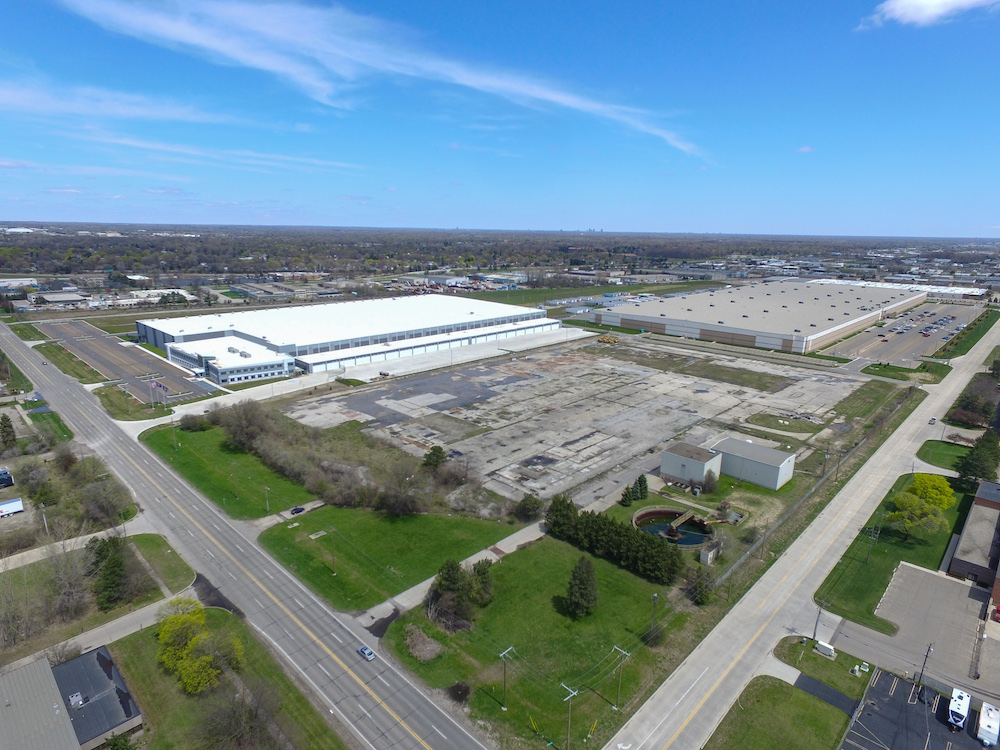
Republic National Distributing Company warehouse (left), Amazon fulfillment center (right), and now-developed 19 acres (center) in 2019

RACER sold its Delco Chassis site in Livonia, Michigan to Ashley Capital in August 2015. The buyer built a 1-million square-foot facility that it leases to Amazon.com as a fulfillment center. Over 500 temporary construction jobs were created, and in the summer of 2017, Amazon estimated it would hire more than 1,000 employees to staff the facility. Ashley Capital sold a portion of the same site to Republic National Distributing Company. The wine and spirits distributor is building a 515,000 square-foot development that will serve as both a regional headquarters and a logistics facility. It is estimated that the company will invest over $67 million in the project and need to hire 525 employees. In May 2021, Ashley Capital purchased the remaining 19 acres of the property and constructed a 370,000 sq. ft. speculative industrial building.

=== Ypsilanti Township, Michigan ===
In November 2016, RACER sold 312 acres of its Willow Run Transmission plant to a partnership that has redeveloped the property into the American Center for Mobility, a state-of-the-art, four-season testing facility for connected and automated vehicles in Ypsilanti Township, Michigan. The facility includes a 2.5-mile test track with ramps, a 700-degree tunnel, and other components necessary to developing and marketing driverless automobiles and related technologies.

Prior to this sale, RACER sold 144,000 square feet of former manufacturing space on almost 17 acres of this property for the newly relocated Yankee Air Museum, which suffered a devastating fire at its previous location in 2004.

=== Spotsylvania County, Virginia ===
Old GM owned a single property in Virginia, located near Fredericksburg in Spotsylvania County, which RACER took possession of as part of Old GM's bankruptcy. The 265,000 square-foot manufacturing facility and 76 acres of land were sold by RACER to idX Corporation in May 2017. It was reported in 2017 that the company will spend approximately $7.2 million developing the site and create 150 new jobs.

=== Ewing Township, New Jersey ===
In August 2018, RACER sold its 80-acre vacant industrial lot in Ewing Township, New Jersey to Atlantic Realty. The buyer is redeveloping the property into a mixed-use township center including 14,000 sq. ft. of commercial space and 90,000 sq. ft. of residential space.

== Controversies ==
=== Ontario, Ohio ===
In August 2012, RACER announced it had reached agreement with the Brownfield Communities Development Company, a joint venture between Hilco and the Adler Group, for the sale of the former Ontario Stamping plant, a 2.5-million-square-foot manufacturing facility in Ontario, Ohio. The sale was completed in December 2012. "We are taking an obsolete single-tenant facility and turning it into a modern multi-tenant business generator,” said Michael M. Adler, CEO and Chairman of the Adler Group. "We are excited to start the next phase of the project and we are looking forward to working with the community." The company promised to create 500 jobs within five years or pay a $1 million fine to the city.

Brownfield Communities Development Company represented to RACER and to the community in a Development Agreement dated August 16, 2012, that it intended to seek new tenants to occupy most of the intact building. In a letter dated April 12, 2013, Michael M. Adler, president of Ontario Business Park LLC, requested approval from the City of Ontario for demolition of the buildings on the property. The request was approved by the Ontario City Council and the buildings were demolished and sold for scrap.

Brownfield Communities Development Company claimed that its marketing of the property was thwarted by ongoing environmental activity at the property, despite never having raised the environmental conditions as a potential impediment when purchasing the property and despite ample examples of RACER properties that were purchased and redeveloped while environmental activities were ongoing. The Ohio Environmental Protection Agency, the regulatory agency that oversaw RACER's cleanup activities at the property, issued a Covenant Not to Sue to RACER in April 2016, certifying the completion of environmental cleanup at the property.

In August 2017, the Ontario City Council sent a notice of default of completion to the Adler Group. After lengthy discussions, the two parties agreed to transfer title of the entire property to the city in exchange for the return of a $1 million deposit in escrow to the Adler Group. Now owned by the city, and with the assistance of the RACER Trust, a new marketing strategy for the site was developed. In November 2020, it was announced that Industrial Commercial Properties (ICP) would purchase 6 acres of the site, including its 45,000 square-foot press-prep building, and lease it to Charter Next Generation (CNG) for the manufacturing of specialty bags. In March 2022, it was reported that a 90,000-sq. ft. addition would be constructed to expand CNG’s operation. At the same time, ICP unveiled plans to the Ontario City Council for a new 32-foot-high, 250,000 to 300,000-sq. ft. speculative industrial building.

=== Caddo Parish, Louisiana ===
In January 2013, RACER and Elio Motors announced that Elio Motors would purchase the former Shreveport Operations plant in Caddo Parish, Louisiana and hire 1,500 people to manufacture the company's innovative three-wheel, gas-powered vehicles. The deal was restructured to enable purchase of the facility by the Caddo Parish Industrial Development Board (IDB) in December 2013, with a master lease provided to Industrial Realty Group (dba Shreveport Business Park) and a secondary lease provided to Elio Motors. Shreveport Business Park, in addition to making monthly lease payments to the IDB, is responsible for all of the property's marketing, maintenance and upkeep.

Local elected officials who initially were supportive of Elio Motors began to publicly criticize the deal as Elio Motors continued to miss start-of-production targets, citing lack of capital. In particular, Caddo Commissioner Matthew Linn and Louisiana State Rep. Cedric Glover, a prominent supporter of Elio Motors during his time as mayor of Shreveport, levied false allegations — Commissioner Linn that RACER threatened to demolish the plant if the Caddo Parish IDB did not purchase it, and Rep. Glover that the sale of the plant prevented other prospects from leasing or purchasing the plant. Rep. Glover sponsored a House resolution requesting “the House Committee on Commerce to study the state of the automotive manufacturing industry in the state of Louisiana since the onset of the most recent worldwide economic downturn.”

The House Committee on Commerce convened a hearing on the transaction on October 26, 2016, in Shreveport. The committee issued a two-page report that included no conclusions or finding of fact, except to note that, “Since the October 2016 meeting, officials with the North Louisiana Economic partnership announced that GLOVIS America, a subsidiary of Hyundai, will open a new distribution center in the former General Motors facility that will result in the production of 75,000 vehicles annually and the creation of 400 new positions in north Louisiana.”

In 2017, the Louisiana House authorized the creation of a subcommittee of the House Committee on Commerce “to further examine certain matters relative to the (RACER Trust’s) fulfillment of fiduciary duties concerning the former General Motors Shreveport plant.” A report of the subcommittee was due 30 days before the start of the 2018 Regular Session of the Legislature of Louisiana. No report was issued.

== See also ==
- General Motors Chapter 11 reorganization
- General Motors Company
- Motors Liquidation Company
