= Willow Run Transmission =

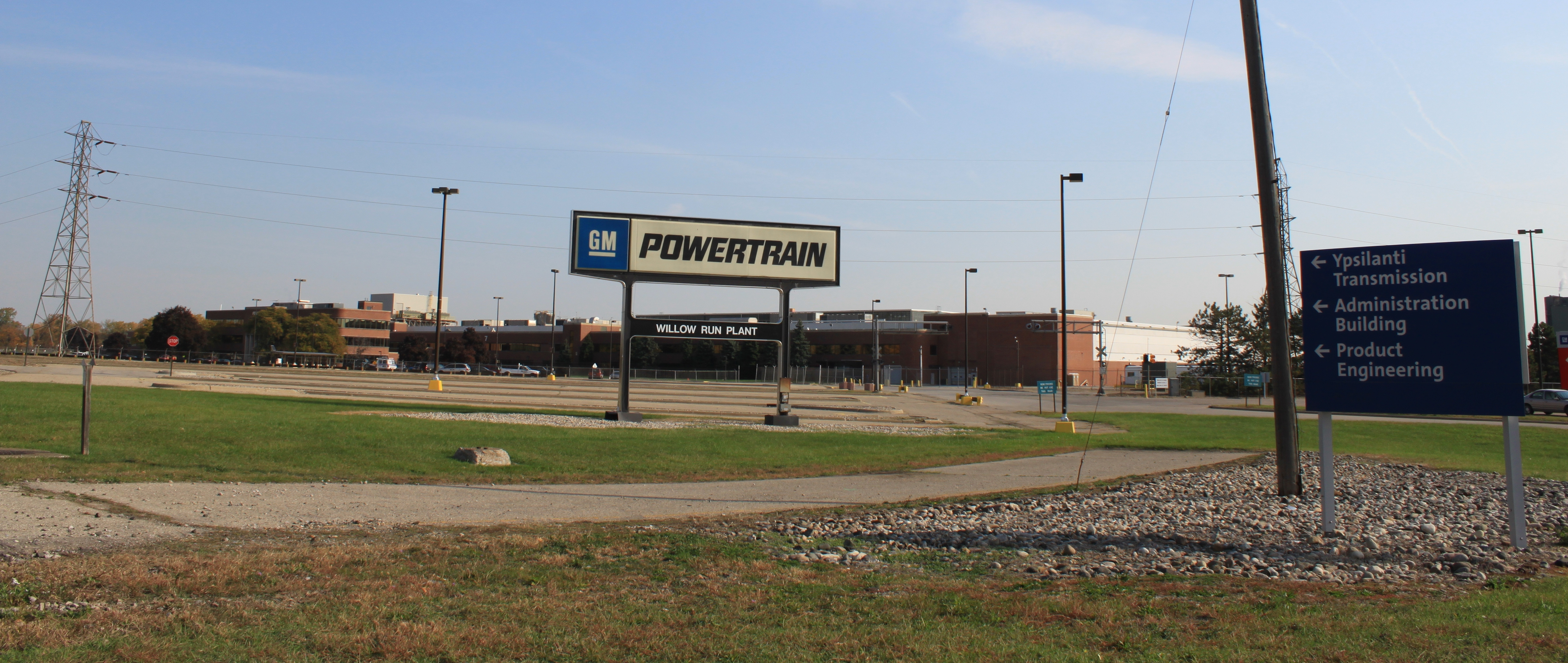
- Willow Run Transmission plant, taken shortly before its final closing (2010)
- Operated: 1953–2010
- Location: Ypsilanti Township, Michigan
- Coordinates: 42.2422°N 83.5511°W
- Industry: Automotive
- Products: Hydramatic and automatic transmissions
- Owner: General Motors
- Defunct: December 2010; 15 years ago

Willow Run Transmission (also called Ypsilanti Transmission Operations, YTO) was a General Motors factory in Ypsilanti Township, Michigan. Acquired by GM in 1953, it produced Hydramatic and other automatic transmissions for use in vehicles built by General Motors and other automakers. The factory first opened in 1941 as the Ford Willow Run facility, which built B-24 Liberator bombers during World War II, and its original building (still preserved within the fabric of the GM Powertrain plant) was designed by noted architect Albert Kahn.

Following the war, the bomber plant was sold as surplus property to the Kaiser-Frazer Corporation, a partnership of construction and shipbuilding magnate Henry J. Kaiser and Graham-Paige executive Joseph W. Frazer. From 1947 to 1953, Willow Run built Kaiser and Frazer cars for Kaiser-Frazer and its successor Kaiser Motors. Kaiser also produced cargo planes during the Korean War at Willow Run under license from Fairchild Aircraft, including the C-119 Flying Boxcar.

== General Motors production ==
The Willow Run factory was acquired by General Motors in late 1953, after the Detroit Transmission plant in Livonia, Michigan, which held GM's only Hydramatic production line, burned down in mid-August; the line was up and running at Willow Run a mere nine weeks after the fire. The plant grew over the years from the 3,500,000 square feet (330,000 m^{2}) bomber plant to the nearly 5,000,000 square feet (460,000 m^{2}) GM Powertrain factory and engineering center that the company abandoned as part of its 2009 bankruptcy. A parcel of land south of the Powertrain facility became Willow Run Assembly, which produced cars until 1992, later being sold by GM and becoming the Willow Run Business Center.

In addition to making automatic transmissions, Willow Run Transmission also produced the M16A1 rifle and the M39A1 20mm autocannon for the U.S. military during the Vietnam War.

=== Products manufactured ===
This list is incomplete; please help by expanding it.

- GM Turbo-Hydramatic 200
- GM Turbo-HydraMatic 425
- GM Turbo-Hydramatic 400
- GM Turbo-Hydramatic 125
- GM Turbo-Hydramatic 325
- GM 4L80 transmission
- GM 4L85 transmission
- GM 4T60 transmission
- GM 4T80-E transmission
- GM 6L80 transmission
- GM 6L90 transmission
- M16A1 rifle
- M39A1 20mm autocannon

== Closure and redevelopment ==
On June 1, 2009, GM announced it would be closing the plant as part of its bankruptcy proceedings. The plant was transferred to Motors Liquidation Company, and transmission production ended on December 15, 2010. The RACER Trust, which was charged with cleaning up and discharging with old GM properties, has controlled the property since March 2011, and received among other proposals an offer from A.E. Equities Group Holdings to buy the plant in 2011.

In April 2013, the Detroit Free Press confirmed that the RACER Trust was negotiating with the Yankee Air Museum, which had until August 2013 to raise the funds needed to purchase a portion of the original bomber plant, which became part of what was Willow Run Transmission. The museum would consolidate operations scattered on various parcels around Willow Run, and the trust expected to clear the remainder of the Powertrain plant for redevelopment.

The main Willow Run article has more details on the complex's history, and its redevelopment efforts.
