= Motors Liquidation Company =

American automotive company

- Formerly: General Motors Company (1908–1916); General Motors Corporation (1916–2009)
- Type: Public
- Traded as: OTC Pink: MTLQQ; OTC Pink: GMGMQ; NYSE: GM
- Industry: Automotive
- Founded: 1908 (as General Motors Company); 2009 (changed name to Motors Liquidation Company)
- Defunct: March 31, 2011; 15 years ago
- Fate: Filed for Chapter 11 bankruptcy in 2009. Reorganized as General Motors Company.
- Successor: General Motors; RACER Trust and four other trusts
- Headquarters: Detroit, Michigan, United States

Motors Liquidation Company (MLC), formerly General Motors Corporation, was the company left to settle past liability claims from Chapter 11 reorganization of the former American car manufacturer General Motors. It exited bankruptcy on March 31, 2011, and was subsequently carved into five trusts: the first to settle the claims of unsecured creditors (General Unsecured Creditors Trust); the second to handle environmental cleanup for MLC's remaining assets (RACER Trust); the third (Asbestos Personal Injury Trust) to handle present and future asbestos-related claims (such as from braking systems); the fourth for litigation claims (Action Avoidance Trust); and the fifth for general unresolved GMC matters (MLC Debtor In Possession Lenders Trust).

Motors Liquidation Company's stock symbol was changed from GMGMQ to MTLQQ, effective July 15, 2009. MTLQQ stock was cancelled. Its unsecured creditors were issued stock for the Motors Liquidation Company General Unsecured Creditors Trust under the symbol MTLQU.

== History ==
=== Bankruptcy filing ===
On the morning of June 1, 2009, Chevrolet-Saturn of Harlem, a dealership in Manhattan that was owned by GM itself, filed for bankruptcy protection there, followed in the same court by General Motors Corporation (the main GM in Detroit), GM's subsidiary Saturn LLC, and Saturn LLC's subsidiary Saturn Distribution Corporation. All cases were assigned to Judge Robert Gerber.

The filing by the dealership declared General Motors to be a debtor in possession. The Manhattan dealership's filing allowed General Motors to file its own bankruptcy petition in the United States Bankruptcy Court for the Southern District of New York, its preferred court. Normally for such cases, the company would have filed in the courts located in the state(s) where the company is incorporated, or where it conducts operations, which for Detroit-headquartered General Motors would have been the courts in Michigan or Delaware, where it is incorporated. General Motors' attorneys, however, preferred to file in the federal courts in New York, because those courts have a reputation for expertise in bankruptcy. In a press conference that began four hours and eighteen minutes after the filing, the GM Chief Executive Officer, Fritz Henderson, stressed that he intended for the bankruptcy process to move quickly. In addition to Henderson's press conference, President of the United States Barack Obama made a speech from the White House four hours and three minutes after the court filing.

=== Court schedule and motions ===
The General Motors bankruptcy case was formally entitled In re General Motors Corp., case number 09-50026 in the Southern District, Manhattan, New York. General Motors was represented by the New York specialist law firm Weil, Gotshal & Manges. The United States Treasury and an ad hoc group of the bondholders of General Motors Corporation were also represented in court.

One of the first motions filed in court was to void the leases on the seven corporate jets, and corporate aircraft hangar at Detroit Metropolitan Wayne County Airport, which the company said were no longer valuable to the company's business. A GM spokesman said that the company had found itself unable to escape the lease in 2008 when it had tried to.

On June 1, 2009, the court gave interim approval to GM's request to borrow $15 billion as debtor-in-possession financing, the company only having $2 billion cash in hand. The United States Treasury had argued in court that it was the only source of such debtor in possession funding, and that without the money from the loan, General Motors would have no option but liquidation. Other motions in the first-day hearing included motions to approve payments to key suppliers and to employees and distributors who are in possession of goods manufactured for General Motors. All motions passed in court without substantial objection.

The case schedule laid out by the court was as follows:

- June 19, 2009: Deadline for filing all objections to the sale of General Motors.
- June 22, 2009: Deadline for making competing bids in the auction of General Motors' assets.
- June 25, 2009: Final hearing on the bankruptcy loan.
- July 10, 2009: Deadline for completion of the sale, requested by the U.S. Treasury and General Motors.

=== Failed sale of Hummer ===
On June 1, 2009, GM announced that the Hummer brand would be discontinued. The following day GM announced that it had reached a deal to sell the brand to an undisclosed buyer. Later, on June 2, 2009, the buyer was disclosed to be Chinese road equipment manufacturer Tengzhong. Tengzhong itself confirmed the deal on their website the same day. The proposed transaction was scheduled to close in the third quarter of 2009, subject to customary closing conditions and regulatory approvals; financial terms of the agreement were not disclosed.

Chinese regulators refused to allow for the purchase of the brand and GM decided on February 24, 2010, to retire the brand. Despite the failed sale, GM discussed entertaining interest in part of the Hummer brand, subsequently made no effort in that direction, leaving Hummer to close.

=== Failed sale of Saturn ===
On June 5, 2009, GM announced that the Saturn brand would be sold to the Penske Automotive Group. GM would continue building the Aura, Outlook and Vue for Penske for two years. However, the Penske deal failed and the Saturn division became defunct.

=== Sale of Saab to Spyker Cars ===
On June 16, 2009, it was announced that Koenigsegg and a group of Norwegian investors planned to acquire the Saab brand from General Motors. GM would continue to supply architecture and powertrain technology for an unspecified amount of time. It also becomes the last brand/subsidiary from GM to be sold (Hummer was first, followed by Saturn). The deal failed on November 24, 2009. GM, however, requested Spyker Cars to acquire Saab from MLC a few weeks later. But however, MLC announced it would close Saab on December 19, 2009, although this plan was later reversed. Motors Liquidation Company had until January 7, 2010, for the deadline of the revised bid. The sale of Saab to Spyker was approved on January 26, 2010, and completed on February 23, 2010.

=== Franchise dealership consolidation controversy ===
Since the early 1990s, GM had been trying to close dealership locations under its Project 2000. At the time, GM had about 9,000 franchise dealers nationwide, most selling a single brand. Many of these locations sold few vehicles and supporting them was costly for GM. Under Project 2000, GM would eliminate or relocate dealerships, and also focused on establishing multi-brand locations, selling Buick, Pontiac and GMC vehicles or Cadillac, Hummer and Saab vehicles. The program was controversial with dealers, many who didn't want to close their dealership or sell their franchise rights.

However, Section 363 of the Federal Bankruptcy Code allowed GM to force thousands of dealerships to forfeit their franchise rights. Dealers accused GM of fraud and theft and formed the Committee to Restore Dealer Rights. The group helped draft HR 2743 in 2009, which asserted the action taken by GM to consolidate its dealer network without compensation was illegal. However, HR 2743 died in committee, and was never reintroduced.

=== Sale of good assets to New GM ===
GM's assets were sold in a section 363 sale. Because the price that these assets were expected to sell for was very high, there was expected to be only one bidder in the auction, a new company NGMCO Inc. This company had been formed by the United States government with a 60% stake, the federal government of Canada and provincial government of Ontario with a 12% stake, the United Auto Workers and Canadian Auto Workers unions with a 17.5% stake, and the unsecured bondholders of General Motors with a 10% stake. "Old GM" was renamed Motors Liquidation Company.

A creditor meeting, at the New York Hilton, held by the United States Trustee Program, was scheduled for June 3, 2009.

On July 10, 2009, the purchase of the ongoing operational assets and trade name of "old GM" was completed and the purchasing entity, "NGMCO Inc", changed its name to "General Motors Company LLC." The new GM held an IPO on November 17, 2010, that raised an estimated $20.1 billion.

By December 2013, the US government sold the last of its GM stock. By February 2015, the Ontario government sold the last of its 4% stake in GM, and by April 2015, the Canadian federal government sold the last of its own 8% GM stake.

The "new" GM acquired most of the brands and the good assets of the old GM, including the Buick, Cadillac, Chevrolet, GMC, GM Daewoo, Holden, Opel, Pontiac, SAIC-GM, SAIC-GM-Wuling, and Vauxhall brands. Pontiac was quickly phased out by October 31, 2010, GM Daewoo was renamed GM Korea in 2011 and the Daewoo brand was retired, Opel and Vauxhall were sold to Groupe PSA in 2017, and Holden was closed by the end of 2020.

=== The end of MLC ===
MLC exited bankruptcy on March 31, 2011, and was immediately carved into four separate trusts; the first to settle the claims of unsecured creditors of MLC (General Unsecured Creditors Trust); the second (RACER) to manage, perform environmental activities at, and ultimately dispose of certain remaining MLC real and personal property assets; the third to manage asbestos-related claims against MLC (Asbestos Personal Injury Trust); and the fourth for litigation claims against MLC (Action Avoidance Trust).
