= H4 =

H4, H04, or H-4 may refer to:

== Science and mathematics ==
- ATC code H04 Pancreatic hormones, a subgroup of the Anatomical Therapeutic Chemical Classification System
- Histamine H_{4} receptor, a human gene
- Histone H4, a protein involved in the structure of chromatin in eukaryotic cells
- Hydrogen-4 (H-4), an isotope of hydrogen
- H4, a symmetry group in the fifth dimension; see H_{4} polytope
- H-4, a huge eruption of the Hekla volcano around 2310 BC

== Technology ==
- H-4 SOW, a precision-guided glide bomb used by the Pakistan Air Force
- H4 (chronometer), an 18th-century marine chronometer designed by John Harrison
- Zoom H4 Handy Recorder, a handheld digital audio recorder
- <h4></h4>, level 4 heading markup for HTML Web pages, see HTML element#heading

== Transport ==
=== Automobiles and roads ===
- H4, a halogen headlamp bulb
- H4, development name of the Hummer HX concept car
- H-4, shorthand for a 4-cylinder horizontally opposed or "flat four" engine
- H4 Dansteed Way, a road in Milton Keynes, England

=== Aviation ===
- GEN H-4, a Japanese helicopter design
- Hughes H-4 Hercules (Spruce Goose), the largest flying boat ever built
- Héli Sécurité Helicopter Airlines (IATA code), based in France; see List of airline codes (H)
- Inter Islands Airlines (IATA code), a former airline based in Cape Verde

=== Ships and submarines ===
- HMS H4, a 1915 British Royal Navy H-class submarine
- HMS Tenedos (H04), a 1918 British Royal Navy Admiralty S-class destroyer
- USS H-4 (SS-147), a 1918 United States Navy submarine

=== Rail ===
- GNR Class H4, a class of British steam locomotives

== Other uses ==
- Halo 4, a video game created by 343 Industries for the Xbox 360
- H4 (film), a 2013 film
- H-4 visa, issued by the U.S. Citizenship and Immigration Services
- British NVC community H4, a heath community in the British National Vegetation Classification system
- H4 (classification), a cycling classification used in para-cycling
- The Desprez Opening, a move in chess marked by the move 1. h4

== See also ==
- 4H (disambiguation)
- HHhH, a novel by the French author Laurent Binet
