= IINS =

IINS may refer to:

- Implementing Cisco IOS Network Security, part of Cisco certifications
- Illustrated Inclusion of Nature in Self Scale, a tool measuring nature connectedness
- Inelastic incoherent neutron scattering, a vibrational Raman spectroscopy technique

== See also ==
- IIN (disambiguation)
- INS (disambiguation)
