= General Motors Chapter 11 reorganization =

2009 bankruptcy filing by American automobile manufacturer General Motors

- Date: 2009
- Location: U.S.
- Cause: Bankruptcy
- Motive: 2008 automotive crisis
- Organised by: U.S. bankruptcy court
- Verdict: Sale of General Motors subsidiaries and assets

The 2009 General Motors Chapter 11 sale of the assets of automobile manufacturer General Motors and some of its subsidiaries was implemented through Chapter 11, Title 11, United States Code in the United States bankruptcy court for the Southern District of New York. The United States government-endorsed sale enabled the NGMCO Inc. ("New GM") to purchase the continuing operational assets of the old GM. Normal operations, including employee compensation, warranties, and other customer services were uninterrupted during the bankruptcy proceedings. Operations outside of the United States were not included in the court filing.

The company received $33 billion in debtor-in-possession financing to complete the process. GM filed for Chapter 11 reorganization in the Manhattan New York federal bankruptcy court on June 1, 2009, at approximately 8:00 am EDT. June 1, 2009, was the deadline to supply an acceptable viability plan to the U.S. Treasury. The filing reported US$82.29 billion in assets and US$172.81 billion in debt.

After the Chapter 11 filing, effective Monday, June 8, 2009, GM was removed from the Dow Jones Industrial Average and replaced by Cisco Systems. From Tuesday June 2, old GM stock has traded Over the Counter (Pink Sheets/OTCBB), initially under the symbol GMGMQ and subsequently under the symbol MTLQQ.

On July 10, 2009, a new entity completed the purchase of continuing operations, assets and trademarks of GM as a part of the 'pre-packaged' Chapter 11 reorganization. As ranked by total assets, GM's bankruptcy marks one of the largest corporate Chapter 11 bankruptcies in U.S. history. The Chapter 11 filing was the fourth-largest in U.S. history, following Lehman Brothers, Washington Mutual and WorldCom. A new entity with the backing of the United States Treasury was formed to acquire profitable assets, under section 363 of the Bankruptcy Code, with the new company planning to issue an initial public offering (IPO) of stock in 2010. The remaining pre-petition creditors claims are paid from the former corporation's assets.

== Background ==
The following table is a comparison (estimates) of the new GM and the old GM
Old GM (before July 10, 2009)		New GM (as of July 10, 2009)
Buick; Cadillac; Chevrolet; GM Daewoo (48.2%); GMC; Holden; Opel; Vauxhall Motors; Hummer; Pontiac; Saturn; Saab	Brands	Buick; Cadillac; Chevrolet; GM Daewoo (70.1%); GMC; Holden; Opel; Vauxhall Motors; Hummer
5,900	U.S. Dealerships	5,000
Common shareholders, bondholders and secured creditors	Ownership	The United States Treasury, the Canada Development Investment Corporation, Government of Ontario, Old GM bondholders, and UAW and CAW unions
47	U.S. Plants	34
$94.7 billion USD	Debt	$17 billion USD
91,000	U.S. employees	68,500

General Motors was financially vulnerable before the automotive industry crisis of 2008–2010. In 2005, the company posted a loss of US$10.6 billion (~$16.8 billion in 2025). In 2006, its attempts to obtain U.S. government financing to support its pension liabilities and also to form commercial alliances with Nissan and Renault failed. For fiscal year 2007, GM's losses for the year were US$38.7 billion, (~$57.8 billion in 2025) and sales for the following year dropped by 45%.

On November 7, 2008, General Motors reported it had projected it would run out of cash around mid-2009 without a combination of government funding, a merger, or sales of assets. Ten days later General Motors representatives, along with executives from Ford and Chrysler testified about their need for financial aid at a congressional hearing in Washington D.C. All three companies were unsuccessful in their attempts to obtain legislation to authorize U.S. government aid, and were invited to draft a new action plan for the sustainability of the industry. On December 2, 2008, General Motors submitted its "Restructuring Plan for Long-Term Viability" to the Senate Banking Committee and House of Representatives Financial Services Committee. Congress declined to act, but in December 2008 the Bush administration provided a "bridge loan" to General Motors with the requirement of a revised business plan. It said it needed $4.6 billion in loans within weeks, from the $18 billion it had already requested, and an additional $12 billion in financial support in order to stave off bankruptcy. On February 26, 2009, General Motors announced that its cash reserves were down to $14 billion at the end of 2008. G.M. lost $30.9 billion, or $53.32 a share, in 2008 and spent $19.2 billion of its cash reserves. Mr. Wagoner met with President Obama’s auto task force, and the company said that it could not survive much longer without additional government loans.

On the March 30, 2009 deadline, President Barack Obama declined to provide financial aid to General Motors, and requested that General Motors produce credible plans, saying that the company's proposals had avoided tough decisions, and that Chapter 11 bankruptcy appeared the most promising way to reduce its debts, by allowing the courts to compel bondholders and trade unions into settlements. GM Chairman and CEO Rick Wagoner was also forced to resign. GM bondholders rejected the government's first offer, but the unions agreed to the preferential terms. A bondholder debt to equity counteroffer was ignored.

== Earlier restructuring efforts ==
Efforts to sell General Motors' European operations ran into difficulties, as the corporation was expected to file for bankruptcy protection by June 1, 2009. United States government officials suggested that, if they were satisfied with the company's plans to restructure, the U.S. government would take at least a 50% equity stake and reserve the right to name board members. On May 31, 2009, news broke that the U.S. would initially likely become the largest shareholder of the reorganized GM following a bankruptcy filing and re-emergence from bankruptcy. The U.S. government would invest up to $50 billion and own 60% of the new GM and the Canadian government would own 12.5%.

Some observers also claimed that creditors were encouraged to push GM into bankruptcy protection because it would trigger a credit event, and thus a beneficial financial payout, on credit default swaps held by these creditors. Due to a lack of transparency, there was no way to find out who the CDS protection buyers and protection writers were, and they were subsequently left out of the negotiation process.

=== U.S. government-backed guarantee of warranties ===
On March 29, 2009, the U.S Treasury committed to fund a government guarantee of General Motors' warranty liabilities, up to US$360.6 million (~$525 million in 2025).

On May 27, 2009, the U.S. Treasury advanced a secured loan of US$360.6 million to GM, and GM issued a note to the Treasury for US$360.6 million, plus $24.1 million USD as additional compensation for the warranty advance, pursuant to the terms of the Warranty Agreement dated December 31, 2008, between GM and the U.S. Treasury. The loan funded a separate account established by GM Warranty LLC, a new special purpose subsidiary of GM that was formed to operate the warranty program. GM also on May 29, 2009, contributed $49.2 million to GM Warranty LLC to fund the program.

=== Proposed sale of Opel and Vauxhall ===
On May 30, 2009, it was announced that a deal had been reached to transfer New Opel (Opel plus Vauxhall, minus Saab) assets to a separate company majority-owned by a consortium led by Sberbank of Russia (35%), Magna International of Canada (20%), and Opel employees and car dealers (10%). GM was expected to keep a 35% minority stake in the new company. It was announced on November 3, 2009, that the GM board had decided not to sell off Opel. However, after the reorganization in 2017, Opel and Vauxhall would later be sold to Groupe PSA for $2.3 billion (~$2.97 billion in 2025).

== Chapter 11 protection ==
=== Filing ===
On the morning of June 1, 2009, Chevrolet-Saturn of Harlem, a dealership in Manhattan that is owned by GM itself, filed for bankruptcy protection there, followed in the same court by General Motors Corporation (the main GM in Detroit), GM's subsidiary Saturn LLC, and Saturn LLC's subsidiary Saturn Distribution Corporation. All cases were assigned to Judge Robert Gerber.

The filing by the dealership declared General Motors to be a debtor in possession. The Manhattan dealership's filing allowed General Motors to file its own bankruptcy petition in the United States Bankruptcy Court for the Southern District of New York, its preferred court. Normally, a company would file for bankruptcy in the courts located either in the state where the company is incorporated (which for GM was Delaware), or where it conducts operations (which would have been Michigan, where the company was headquartered). General Motors' attorneys, however, preferred to file in the federal courts in New York, because those courts have a reputation for expertise in bankruptcy. In a press conference later that day, the GM Chief Executive Officer, Fritz Henderson, stressed that he intended for the bankruptcy process to move quickly. In addition to Mr Henderson's press conference, President of the United States Barack Obama made a speech from the White House after the court filing.

=== Court schedule and motions ===
The General Motors Chapter 11 filing formally was entitled "In re General Motors Corp.", and was case number 09-50026 in the Southern District, Manhattan, New York. General Motors was represented by the New York specialist law firm Weil, Gotshal & Manges. The United States Treasury was represented by the United States Attorneys Office for the Southern District of New York and Cadwalader, Wickersham & Taft LLP. An ad hoc group of the bondholders of General Motors Corporation was also represented in court.

One of the first motions filed in court was one to void the leases on the seven corporate jets, and corporate aircraft hangar at Detroit Metropolitan Wayne County Airport, for being no longer valuable to the company's business — a lease that the company had, according to its spokesman, found itself unable to escape in 2008 when it had tried to.

On June 1, 2009, the court gave interim approval to GM's request to borrow US$15 billion as debtor-in-possession funding, the company only having US$2 billion cash in hand. The United States Treasury argued in court that it was the only source of such debtor in possession funding, and that without the money from the loan General Motors would have no option but liquidation. Other motions in the first-day hearing included motions to approve payments to key suppliers and to employees and distributors who are in possession of goods manufactured for General Motors. All motions passed in court without substantial objection.

The case schedule laid out by the court is as follows:

- 2009-06-19: Deadline for filing all objections to the sale of General Motors.
- 2009-06-22: Deadline for making competing bids in the auction of General Motors' assets.
- 2009-06-25: Final hearing on the bankruptcy loan.
- 2009-07-10: Deadline for completion of the sale, requested by the U.S. Treasury and General Motors.

=== Planned sale ===
General Motors auctioned off its assets in a section 363 sale. Because the price of these assets were very high, there was only one bidder in the auction, NGMCO Inc. ("New GM"). This company was formed by the United States government with a 60.8% stake, the federal government of Canada and provincial government of Ontario with an 11.7% stake, the United and Canadian Auto Workers unions VEBA fund with a 17.5% stake, and the unsecured bondholders of General Motors with a 10% stake. The selling company was Motors Liquidation Company ("Old GM") (see below).

A creditor meeting, at the New York Hilton Hotel, held by the United States Trustee Program, was scheduled for June 3, 2009.

=== Failed sale of Hummer ===
On June 1, 2009, GM announced that the Hummer brand would be discontinued. On October 9, they reached an agreement to sell their entire stake in the Hummer brand to China-based Sichuan Tengzhong Heavy Industrial Machinery Company Ltd. and a group of private investors (Mr. Suolang Duoji, a private entrepreneur with holdings that include the Hong Kong-listed thenardite producer Lumena, would have held the remaining 20 percent stake.) The sale would have net GM around $150 million. The deal would have included manufacturing to continue in the two plants that GM already uses to produce the Hummer trucks through June 2011, with a possible extension until 2012.

On February 24, 2010, GM announced that the sale could not be completed with Sichuan Tengzhong and that they would discontinue the brand. They were approached by several other companies interested in purchasing the Hummer brand and began reviewing potential buyers. However, in the end no sale could be finalised and Hummer was declared defunct on May 24, 2010.

=== Failed sale of Saturn ===
On June 5, 2009, GM announced that the Saturn brand would be sold to the Penske Automotive Group. GM was to continue to build the Aura, Outlook and Vue for Penske for two years, however, as of September 30, 2009, the deal had fallen through. Penske had asked GM to extend the time it was to build Saturns until it could reach a deal with the Renault Group for vehicle replacements in 2012, but since that deal fell through Penske cancelled the planned sale. GM has said that the Saturn brand will be phased out by the 2010 model year, and the brand was declared defunct on October 31, 2010.

=== Sale of Saab ===
On June 16, 2009, it was announced that the Swedish firm Koenigsegg Automotive AB and a group of Norwegian investors planned to acquire the Saab brand from General Motors. GM would have continued to supply architecture and powertrain technology for an unspecified amount of time. On November 24, 2009, it was announced that the sale of Saab to the Koenigsegg Group had collapsed.

"We're obviously very disappointed with the decision to pull out of the Saab purchase," said GM CEO Fritz Henderson in a statement. "Given the sudden change in direction, we will take the next several days to assess the situation and will advise on the next steps next week."

On February 23, 2010 GM sold Saab to Spyker Cars, later renamed Swedish Automobile. The Saab brand would collapse under Spyker in 2012 after filing for bankruptcy.

=== 363 Sale of assets ===
As part of a reorganization plan agreed to with the U.S., Canadian and Ontario governments, and the company's unions, General Motors filed for Chapter 11 bankruptcy protection in a federal Manhattan court in New York on June 1, 2009, at approximately 8:00 am, planning to re-emerge as a less debt-burdened organization. The filing reported US$82.29 billion in assets. The case was assigned to U.S. Bankruptcy Judge Robert Gerber, who had previously presided over another high-profile bankruptcy case of Adelphia Communications Corp.

Shortly after the Chapter 11 filing, it was announced that on Monday, June 8, 2009, GM would be removed from the Dow Jones Industrial Average, and replaced by Cisco Systems. This coincided with the announcement that Citigroup Financial would also be removed and replaced by insurer Travelers Co.

$GM was delisted from the NYSE. Beginning June 2, GM stock traded on the Pink Sheets OTC market under the symbol GMGMQ. On July 15, the stock symbol was changed to MTLQQ ("Motors Liquidation Company").

Despite these developments, the organization expressed optimism in the future success of a "new GM". On July 10, 2009, after an auction process and approval by Judge Gerber concluded, GM's continuing operational assets and trademarks were transferred to the sole bidder, a primarily government-owned entity called "NGMCO Inc.", which upon sale assumed the name General Motors Company. The purchase was supported by $50 billion in U.S. Treasury loans, giving the U.S. government a 60.8% stake. The Queen of Canada, in right of both Canada and Ontario, held 11.7% and the United Auto Workers, through its health-care trust (VEBA), a further 17.5%. The remaining 10% was held by unsecured creditors. In other words, a company called "NGMCO Inc.", financed by the U.S. Treasury, Canada, and a labor union, purchased the desirable assets of "old GM" via the bankruptcy process, thus renaming it to "General Motors Company" and forming a "new GM". This marked the emergence of a new operation from the "pre-packaged" Chapter 11 reorganization. The claims of former stakeholders and remaining pre-petition creditors of "old GM" would be handled by the "Motors Liquidation Company", with the new company planning to issue an initial public offering (IPO) of stock in 2010. The directors of Motors Liquidation Company stated that they believed shares in the "old" GM would eventually have no value since the company had far more debts than assets.

Under the reorganization process, termed a 363 sale (for Section 363 which is located in Title 11, Chapter 3, Subchapter IV of the United States Code, a part of the Bankruptcy Code), the purchaser of the assets of a company in bankruptcy proceedings is able to obtain approval for the purchase from the court prior to the submission of a re-organization plan, free of liens and other claims. It is used in most Chapter 11 cases that involve a sale of property or other assets. This process is typical of large organizations with complex branding and intellectual property rights issues upon exiting bankruptcy.

As ranked by total assets, the Chapter 11 reorganization of "new GM" from the old is one of the largest successful corporate reorganizations in U.S. history, and the fourth-largest bankruptcy in U.S. history by total assets, following Lehman Brothers Holdings Inc., Washington Mutual and WorldCom Inc.

The same day, GM reported 88,000 U.S. employees, and announced plans to reduce its U.S. workforce to 68,000 by the end of 2009.

On July 23, 2009, "new GM" announced its new board of directors: Daniel Akerson (of the Carlyle Group), David Bonderman (of TPG Capital), Robert D. Krebs (a former railroad executive), Patricia F. Russo (the former CEO of Alcatel-Lucent), Ed Whitacre (GM Chairman) and Fritz Henderson (GM CEO).

=== Brand reorganization ===
In addition to selling off brands and killing brands like Pontiac and Goodwrench, General Motors Company restructured its brand architecture and adopted a new corporate identity. The practice of putting the GM "Mark of Excellence" badge on the front doors or fenders of every car with a GM brand, was discontinued in August 2009. The company moved from a 'corporate-endorsed, hybrid-brand' architecture structure (where GM underpinned every brand) to a 'multiple-brand, corporate-invisible' brand architecture structure. The company's familiar square blue Mark of Excellence logo was removed from its website and advertising, in favor of a new, subtle all-text logo treatment.

==== Timeline 2008–2009 ====
October 10, 2008: GM considered exchanging its remaining 49% stake in GMAC to Cerberus Capital Management for Chrysler LLC, potentially merging two of Detroit's "Big Three" automakers. Acquisition talks involving Chrysler were cancelled, however, before November 7, 2008, as part of a broader response to the increasing urgency of GM's own cash flow problems. That was a result of Chrysler's senior bank debt currently trading at less than 50 cents on the dollar and because Chrysler's other owner – Daimler, formerly DaimlerChrysler – recently revalued its 19.9% Chrysler stake down to zero, which may or may not reflect its value in a potential sale.

December 12, 2008: General Motors stated that it was nearly out of cash, and may not survive past 2009. The U.S. Senate voted and strongly opposed any source of government assistance through a bailout bridge loan (originally worth $14 billion in emergency aid) which was aimed toward helping the struggling Big Three automakers financially, despite strong support from President George W. Bush and President-elect Barack Obama, along with some mild support from the Democratic and Republican political parties.

Prior to the U.S. Senate's announcement, General Motors announced that it had hired several lawyers to discuss the possibility of filing for bankruptcy, with Chapter 11 bankruptcy being one of the options discussed. GM stated that "all options are on the table" for the company. Chrysler LLC, which is owned by Cerberus Capital Management, in a similar financial situation, warned that it, too, was nearly out of cash and might not survive much longer.

December 18, 2008: President Bush announced that an "orderly" bankruptcy was one option being considered for both General Motors and Cerberus-owned Chrysler LLC. Sources said that setting up this type of "orderly" bankruptcy would be complicated because it would not only involve talks with the automakers, but also the unions and other stakeholders would have to be involved.

December 19, 2008: President Bush approved a bailout plan and gave General Motors and Chrysler $13.4 billion in financing from TARP (Troubled Assets Relief Program) funds, as well as $4 billion to be "withdrawn later".

As of February 14, 2009: General Motors was considering filing for Chapter 11 bankruptcy under a plan that would assemble all of their viable assets, including some U.S. brands and international operations, into a new company. Less than a week later, its Saab subsidiary filed for bankruptcy protection in Sweden.

March 5, 2009: GM's independent public accounting firm (Deloitte & Touche) issued a qualified opinion as part of GM's 2008 annual report that stated "[these conditions] raise substantial doubt about its ability to continue as a going concern". A qualified going concern audit letter like this is only issued by the auditors when the company is in extreme financial distress and it is likely that it may file for bankruptcy protection.

March 12, 2009: GM's CFO Ray Young said that it would not need the requested $2B (~$2.91 billion in 2025) in March noting that the cost-cutting measures are starting to take hold.

March 29, 2009: GM's Chairman and CEO, Rick Wagoner, agreed to immediately resign his position as part of an Obama administration automotive restructuring plan. Wagoner was replaced by Fritz Henderson. In announcing that plan, on March 30, 2009, President Obama stated that both GM and Chrysler may need to use "our bankruptcy code as a mechanism to help them restructure quickly and emerge stronger". He also announced that the warranties on cars made by these companies would be guaranteed by the U.S. Government.

March 31, 2009: President Barack Obama announced that he would give GM 60 additional days to try and restructure their company and prove their viability. If they succeeded, Washington would provide General Motors with additional bridge loans. However, if GM could not meet the requirements set by the White House, a prepackaged bankruptcy is probable. President Obama reiterated that GM will be part of the future even if bankruptcy is necessary.

April 22, 2009: GM stated that it will not be able to make their June 1, 2009, debt payment.

April 24, 2009: GM announced that they will be scrapping the Pontiac brand in an effort to invest more money into their major brands (Buick, Cadillac, Chevrolet, and GMC). It was the second discontinuation of a major GM brand in the 21st century, after Oldsmobile (which ended production in 2004).

May 4, 2009: German Economy Minister Karl-Theodor zu Guttenberg said Fiat (among others) might be interested in the GM European unit.

June 1, 2009: GM filed for Chapter 11 Bankruptcy, the fourth largest filing in the United States history after Lehman Brothers, Washington Mutual, and Worldcom. On June 29, 2009, General Motors announced that they would discontinue the NUMMI joint venture with Toyota.

July 10, 2009: A new company financed by the United States Treasury, "NGMCO Inc" purchased most of the assets, and the trademarks of the General Motors Corporation. Vehicle Acquisition Holdings LLC then changed its name to "General Motors Company". The General Motors Corporation (old GM) in turn changed its name to "Motors Liquidation Company" and it continued in bankruptcy proceedings to settle with its bondholders, and on other liabilities. The new GM company, after the purchase of most of the assets of "old GM" is not a participant in the continuing bankruptcy proceedings of Motors Liquidation Company (Old GM). The "new GM" is mostly owned by the United States Government.

== Motors Liquidation Company ==
General Motors Corporation, upon sale of its major assets, trademarks and intellectual property on July 10, 2009, pursuant to the provisions of section 363 of the Bankruptcy Code, was renamed as Motors Liquidation Company. It continued its bankruptcy court proceedings, exiting bankruptcy and splitting into four trusts. Motors Liquidation Company announced on July 10, 2009, in relation to its equity and debt investors:

Management continues to remind investors of its strong belief that there will be no value for the common stockholders in the bankruptcy liquidation process, even under the most optimistic of scenarios. Stockholders of a company in chapter 11 generally receive value only if all claims of the company's secured and unsecured creditors are fully satisfied. In this case, management strongly believes all such claims will not be fully satisfied, leading to its conclusion that the common stock will have no value.

None of the publicly owned stocks or bonds issued by the former General Motors Corporation (now renamed "Motors Liquidation Company"), including its common stock formerly traded on the New York Stock Exchange under the ticker symbol "GM", are or will become securities of General Motors Company (the "new GM"), which is an independent separate company. All of these securities relate to Motors Liquidation Company, and will be treated in accordance with the provisions of the U.S. Bankruptcy Code and the rulings of the Bankruptcy court.

Motors Liquidation Company's stock symbol was changed from GMGMQ to MTLQQ, effective July 15, 2009.

== New General Motors ==
The new General Motors was named General Motors Company LLC, a separate and independent entity from the old corporation. The new company retained four of its major brands: Chevrolet, Cadillac, GMC, and Buick. It planned to keep 3,600 out of 6,000 of its US dealerships. Lastly, the company was also shutting down 14 of its US plants, which would eliminate 20,000 of its 80,000 current employees. The present General Motors Company is a smaller, restructured version of the former General Motors Corporation.

=== Bailouts ===
==== European loans ====
GM received loans from European governments in 2009, and reduced its ownership stake in European operations as part of its reorganization. As of July 10, 2009, the new GM has over $40 billion in cash, with the company's reorganized liability total of $48.8 billion which includes $24.4 billion to be paid to the Voluntary Employee Beneficiary Association (VEBA) trust, $9 billion to the U.S. and Canadian governments, and $15 billion in liabilities to suppliers and other bills. GM was bound to pay $10 billion to the VEBA trust in December 2009, with the remainder being paid in increments from 2012-19. GM was not required to make contributions to its pension fund until 2013, but it could elect to if needed, since the company contributed $15.2 billion to its pension fund in 2003. Stock market conditions cause the fund value to fluctuate. In February 2009, GM's combined pension fund had about $85 billion in assets, $56 billion in assets for hourly pensions and $29 billion in assets for salaried pensions.

==== United States ====
Through the Troubled Asset Relief Program the US Treasury invested a total $51 billion into the GM bankruptcy. Until December 10, 2013, the U. S. Treasury recovered $39 billion from selling its GM stake. The final direct cost to the Treasury of the GM bailout was $11-12 billion ($10.5 billion for General Motors and $1.5 billion for former GM financing GMAC, now known as Ally). Local tax incentives amounted to $1.7 billion, most of them in Michigan. A study by the Center for Automotive Research found that the GM bailout saved 1.2 million jobs and preserved $34.9 billion in tax revenue.

=== 2012 suit ===
In 2012, a trust representing "old" GM's unsecured creditors filed suit in the Southern District of New York against GM over payments made to hedge funds in 2009 in exchange for waiving of claims against GM's Canadian subsidiary. The deal, of which Judge Robert Gerber says he was unaware despite its disclosure in an SEC filing on the day GM sought Chapter 11 protection, could prompt at the time a reopening of the 2009 case.

== See also ==
- Automotive industry crisis of 2008–2010
- Chrysler Chapter 11 reorganization
