= HH4 =

HH4 or HH-4:

- Field of Dishonor, the fourth novel in the Honor Harrington series by David Weber, abbreviated HH4
- HH4, a model in the series of Honda Acty trucks
- 01444 — Haywards Heath (HH4), West Sussex, England, UK; see list of dialling codes in the United Kingdom
- HH4, one of the Hamburger–Hamilton stages in chick development

== See also ==
- H4 (disambiguation)
