= VEBA (disambiguation) =

VEBA was a German state owned energy company.

VEBA or Veba may also refer to:

- Voluntary employees' beneficiary association
- Veba, artist that recorded Veba vs Grand Central, a 2005 compilation album of Grand Central Records
