= Judge Gerber =

Judge Gerber may refer to:

- Joel Gerber (1940–2022), judge of the United States Tax Court
- Robert Gerber (fl. 1960s–2020s), judge of the United States Bankruptcy Court judge for the Southern District of New York
