= 4H (disambiguation) =

4H may refer to:

- 4-H, a youth organization administered by the USDA
- Curtiss JN-4H, an American biplane
- 4H, a Washington, D.C. Metrobus route, in the United States
- 4H-pyran
- 4H-SiC, one of the polymorphs of silicon carbide
- Hydrogen-4 (^{4}H, or quadrium), an isotope of hydrogen
- 4H, IATA code for United Airways, a Bangladeshi airline
- 4H disease, an early name for AIDS since the syndrome seemed to affect heroin users, homosexuals, hemophiliacs, and Haitians
- 4H, the production code for the 1975 Doctor Who serial Planet of Evil

== See also ==
- H4 (disambiguation)
