= Chevrolet-Saturn of Harlem =

Car dealership in New York City

Coordinates: 40°48′16″N 73°55′59″W

Chevrolet-Saturn of Harlem, Inc.
- Type: Subsidiary
- Industry: Automotive
- Founded: 2006
- Defunct: January 2011; 15 years ago
- Fate: Filed for Chapter 11 bankruptcy, closed after the GM reorganization
- Headquarters: New York City, U.S.
- Area served: New York metropolitan area
- Products: Automobiles
- Brands: Chevrolet; Saturn
- Parent: General Motors

Chevrolet-Saturn of Harlem, Inc., was a car dealership in the East Harlem neighborhood in New York City. Originally touted as a minority-owned dealership and part of the only new-car facility in Harlem, it was abandoned by its original operator within months and was taken over by General Motors directly. On June 1, 2009, it was used as the lead company in the General Motors Chapter 11 reorganization filing in New York.

== Overview ==
The Harlem auto mall opened in February 2006 but had its ceremonial opening on June 2, 2006. Located between 2nd and 3rd Avenues at 127th Street in East Harlem, it was the largest dealership complex in Manhattan, the only new-vehicle dealerships north of 57th Street, and the first new-vehicle dealerships in Harlem in 40 years. Run by Otis Thornton, a black man and Buick dealer in East Brunswick, New Jersey, the Chevy and Saturn dealership in the Mall received attention for being a large, new minority-owned business: the opening was attended by Jesse Jackson, New York mayor Michael Bloomberg, General Motors chairman and CEO Rick Wagoner, New York City Economic Development Corporation president Andrew Alper, and New York City Department of Transportation commissioner Iris Weinshall.

The mall was developed by the Potamkin Auto Group, which through its Potamkin Development LLC subsidiary acquired nearly an entire block of city-owned land and built the mall's stores to lease to manufacturer tenants. The Chevrolet and Saturn store occupied a 138,000-square-foot (12,800 m^{2}) three-story building at 2485 Second Avenue with rooftop parking and room for 300 vehicles, next door to Potamkin Cadillac-Hummer of Harlem at 2495 Second Avenue. The Cadillac-Hummer store was Potamkin's own, headed by Craig Lee as president and executive manager, while General Motors established the Chevrolet and Saturn store under its minority dealer development program.

The dealership was funded with $60,000,000 in private investment and $17,000,000 in tax-exempt empowerment zone bonds from the NYCEDC's New York City Industrial Development Agency, and was advertised by the city government as "bringing 150 new jobs to Harlem to date with expected growth up to 200 jobs".

However, Otis Thornton quit in December 2006, and General Motors took direct control of the company, planning to maintain it until another owner could be found. Potamkin's own portion of the mall added Hyundai and Mitsubishi franchises in 2007.

On June 1, 2009, Chevrolet-Saturn of Harlem was the first GM company to file Chapter 11 bankruptcy, in order for the United States Bankruptcy Court for the Southern District of New York to obtain jurisdiction over the entire General Motors Chapter 11 reorganization. General Motors Corporation and its other subsidiaries filed in the same court moments later. The same morning, despite the filings, a man at the dealership told the media he was the dealership's "owner" but refused to identify himself or comment on the bankruptcy. Chevrolet-Saturn of Harlem was renamed MLC of Harlem, Inc. after the sale of most of the old company's assets to the new General Motors, which closed in July 2009.

General Motors closed the dealership in January 2011, a GM spokeswoman cited four years of operation and "millions of dollars" in losses and support. Potamkin, which owned the site, released General Motors from the remaining 11 years of its Harlem lease and leased General Motors a building it owned at 704 Eleventh Avenue on Manhattan's auto row instead. Alan Potamkin said General Motors had moved to Harlem in the expectation that rents on Eleventh Avenue would rise sharply, but BMW, Mercedes-Benz and Volkswagen dealerships had since opened there. In August 2011, the Potamkin family announced it would sell the whole block, which the Post reported could hold more than 765,000 square feet (71,100 m^{2}) of housing, by which time the former General Motors building had been leased to a Chevrolet and Cadillac dealer.
