= Tengzhong =

Chinese road equipment manufacturer

Sichuan Tengzhong Heavy Industrial Machinery
- Type: Privately owned company
- Industry: Automotive; Heavy equipment
- Founded: 2005 (Chengdu)
- Headquarters: Chengdu, China
- Area served: Worldwide
- Products: Construction equipment Heavy-duty trucks
- Website: www.sctengzhong.com

Sichuan Tengzhong Heavy Industrial Machinery Co., Ltd
- Simplified Chinese: 四川腾中重工机械有限公司
- Traditional Chinese: 四川騰中重工機械有限公司
Transcriptions
Standard Mandarin
- Hanyu Pinyin: Sìchuān Téngzhōng Zhòng Gōngjīxiè Yǒuxiàn Gōngsī

Alternative Chinese name
- Simplified Chinese: 腾中重工
- Traditional Chinese: 騰中重工
Transcriptions
Standard Mandarin
- Hanyu Pinyin: Téng Zhōng Zhòng Gōng

Sichuan Tengzhong Heavy Industrial Machinery Co., Ltd. is based in Chengdu, China. Sichuan Tengzhong is a privately owned company known for making a wide range of road equipment, such as bridge piers, highway construction and maintenance machinery. Sichuan Tengzhong has been moving more into heavy-duty trucks, including tow trucks and oil tankers.

== Aborted acquisition of Hummer ==
On 1 June 2009, as a part of General Motors Chapter 11 reorganization announcement, GM revealed that Hummer brand would be discontinued. However, the following day GM announced it had reached a deal to sell the brand to an undisclosed buyer. On 2 June 2009 GM announced the sale of Hummer to a non-disclosed Chinese company. The New York Times reported Tuesday that the buyer would be the Sichuan Tengzhong Heavy Industrial Machinery Company Ltd., a machinery company in western China. Late Tuesday Sichuan Tengzhong itself posted it on their own website. The transaction was expected to close in the third quarter of 2009, subject to customary closing conditions and regulatory approvals. Financial terms of the agreement were not disclosed. Credit Suisse acted as exclusive financial advisor and Shearman&Sterling acted as international legal counsel to Tengzhong on this transaction. Citi acted as financial advisor to GM. Prior to the 2009 sale a handful of other Chinese automakers, including Chang Feng, expressed interest in the brand, but all declined to make a formal offer.

The deal include the continuation of manufacturing in the two plants that GM already used to produce the Hummer trucks until June 2011, with a possible extension until 2012.

On 24 February 2010, The Chinese Ministry of Commerce rejected Tengzhong's bid to purchase Hummer from General Motors, and that the deal had collapsed. The later stated the same and that they will discontinue the brand. Some reports were saying that Tengzhong would instead purchase it privately through the company's new supporter, J&A Tengzhong Fund SPC, a private equity investment fund owned by an offshore entity that was recruiting private investors to buy into its acquisition plan. At the time, even established companies were in difficulties. With them, small companies were also declining (including Tengzong). Also falling was Hummer's value, with lowered customer demand.

After that, some other buyers were approached to buy the brand, but those deals also failed. Finally, the Hummer brand was defunct on 24 May 2010.
