= IIN =

IIN and variants may mean:

- International Institute for Nanotechnology at Northwestern University
- II-n or IIn, a subtype of Type II supernova
- Issuer Identification Number, a field in the ISO/IEC 7812 specification for ID cards
- IIN, ICAO airline code for Inter Islands Airlines
- IIN, IATA airport code for Nishinoomote Airport or Tanagashima Airport in the Ōsumi Islands
- Nieuport II.N, an airplane model
- iin, former stock ticker symbol for Australian ISP iiNet, now part of TPG Telecom
