= Southern District of New York =

The Southern District of New York is a federal judicial district that encompasses the counties of New York (Manhattan), Bronx, Westchester, Rockland, Putnam, Orange, Dutchess, and Sullivan.

Federal offices or agencies operating in the district include:

- United States Attorney for the Southern District of New York
- United States Bankruptcy Court for the Southern District of New York
- United States District Court for the Southern District of New York

== See also ==
- Eastern District of New York
- Northern District of New York
- Western District of New York
