= Bankruptcy of Saab Automobile =

Bankruptcy of Swedish car company Saab

Saab Automobile was sold to Spyker Cars N.V. in 2010 after a deal between Spyker and then-current owner General Motors. After struggling to avoid insolvency throughout 2011, the company petitioned for bankruptcy following the failure of a Chinese consortium to complete a purchase of the company; the purchase had been blocked by former owner GM, which opposed the transfer of technology and production rights to a Chinese company. In 2012, Spyker filed a lawsuit against GM asking for US$3 billion in damages after GM had attempted to block the deals between Spyker and Chinese automaker Youngman, who were investing in Saab Automobile. Consequently, Saab was forced to file bankruptcy in 2012. Spyker's claim was dismissed in June 2013.

== 2010 ==
On 26 January 2010, General Motors confirmed that Spyker and GM had come to an agreement allowing Spyker to purchase Saab, subject to regulatory and government approval; the sale was completed on February 23, 2010. General Motors would continue to supply Saab with engines and transmissions, and also completed vehicles in the shape of the new Saab 9-4x from GM's Mexican factory. The deal included a loan from the European Investment Bank, guaranteed by the Swedish government. It comprised US$74m in cash up front, payable to GM by July 2010, and shares in Spyker in the amount of US$320m.

Saab announced that it was going to build its US headquarters in Royal Oak, Michigan. A new Saab 9-3 was confirmed for 2012, while production restarted at the Saab plant in Sweden in March 2010. Victor Muller, CEO and founder of Spyker Cars stated in an interview that the take-over was financed solely by Vladimir Antonov with the knowledge of General Motors.

In July, the company said it expected to sell between 50,000 and 55,000 vehicles in 2010. As part of its expansion programme Saab announced plans to return to China after General Motors withdrew the brand from the Chinese market in 2008 due to the 2008 financial crisis, Saab planned to sell between 2,000 and 5,000 cars initially and should the reception of the vehicle go well, it planned to move production to China as well, as the deal would have seen 10 dealerships open. The deal was to be signed with China Automobile Trading Co. Ltd.

In October, the company revised its production target for the year to 30,000 to 35,000 vehicles from 45,000 vehicles, this was down to the fact that it needed more time to recover from plant shutdown for two months at the beginning of the year and reverse liquidation proceedings. It was reported that it was the second time forecast was cut in less than three months. Eventually Saab sold 31,696 cars in 2010.

== 2011 ==
On February 25, Spyker Cars N.V. announced that it had agreed to sell the sports car arm to focus on Saab. Spyker intended to change its name, in May, to include the Saab name.

At the beginning of April several suppliers halted shipment of components to the Trollhättan assembly plant because of unpaid invoices. As a result, Saab had to stop production on April 5.

On 3 May, Spyker Cars reached an agreement with Chinese automaker Hawtai Motor to obtain emergency funding for Saab, aiming to restart production within a week. On May 12, the deal with Hawtai collapsed when it failed to get the necessary approvals. Spyker was still hopeful that a deal could be made with Hawtai. Great Wall Motor, another Chinese car maker, was also rumoured to be in talks with Spyker about investing; however, this was denied by Great Wall on May 13.

On May 16, Spyker announced that it had signed a memorandum of understanding with China's Pang Da Automobile Trade Co. (Pang Da) that would give Saab the financing needed to restart production, and give Pang Da an equity stake in Spyker.

On June 8, Saab said it had stopped production due to an insufficient supply of parts. This occurred only two weeks after resuming production following a seven-week hiatus. Production was due to start again on August 9.

On June 23, Saab announced that it was unable to pay June salaries to the entire workforce of 3,800 due to lack of funding. The trade union IF Metall gave Saab seven days to pay the salaries to their employees; otherwise, IF Metall threatened to force a liquidation of the company. On June 29, Saab employees were paid.

In June, China Youngman Automobile Group (Youngman) and Pang Da announced their intention to buy 54% of Saab for €245 million. They also announced that they would finance three new models, Saab 9-1, Saab 9-6 and Saab 9–7.

On July 26, Saab announced that it was unable to pay July salaries to 1,600 white-collar workers. The company was also unable to verify when the salaries would be paid. However, the entire workforce of blue-collar workers were paid on July 25.

On July 27, it was reported that Bahama-based Gemini Fund would ensure employee salaries did not pay out to Saab, because of the uncertainty arising in securities that would protect the payment. On the same day it was also confirmed by Russian businessman Vladimir Antonov's Swedish representative Lars Carlström that Antonov has close ties to the fund. On July 28, the trade union Unionen announced that if Saab did not pay the white-collar workers within two weeks, Unionen will force the company into bankruptcy. On the same day, European Investment Bank (EIB) announced it had rejected the request from Vladimir Antonov to become part-owner of Saab. In response to that decision, the director general of Swedish National Debt Office, Bo Lundgren, severely criticised the EIB for its treatment of Antonov in recent months. On August 5, Saab paid the salaries to the white-collar workers through equity issuance where the Gemini Fund bought 5m shares in Saab.

On August 17, the Swedish Enforcement Administration (SEA) started a distraint process of Saab as a result of the company not settling its debts.

On August 19, it was confirmed that SEA had more than 90 cases with claims amounting to 169 million SEK ($25.5 million/€18.4 million) against Saab, of which 22 were in the distraint phase. On the same day, the SEA found an account at Skandinaviska Enskilda Banken, which they hoped contained at least SEK5.1 million ($0.8 million/€0.555 million) which would be used to pay off Saabs debt to Kongsberg Automotive.

On August 23, Saab spokesperson, Gunilla Gustav, announced there was a chance the August salaries may not be paid because of lack of funding. One reason is that Saab had not received the money it was promised. The president of Unionen, Cecilia Fahlberg, was highly critical of unpaid salaries becoming an issue for the third time during the summer, and said the union would restart bankruptcy proceedings unless the salaries were paid. As a result of the announcement, shares of Saabs parent company, Swedish Automobiles, fell by 20%.

On August 25, it was confirmed that the August salaries had not been paid to the blue-collar employees, and most likely its white-collar workers also, whose salaries were rumoured to be paid on August 26. On the same day, SEA announced that it had foreclosed on about SEK50 million (US$7.9 million/€5.45 million) and it was entitled to the money from the company's payroll account if it didn't not find the remainder earlier. Saab had to have approximately SEK100 million (US$15.8 million/€10.9 million) each month in the payroll account in order to remunerate its entire workforce.

On August 26, Swedish Automobile announced that they had pushed back the interim report until the following week (week 35). On the same day it was reported that Saab was preparing an application for reconstruction of the company. Saab was lacking the appropriate funds to start production or pay salaries to its employees and debts to its subcontractors.

On August 31, after a five-day delay, Saab released its interim report which announced a loss of €201.5 million with revenues of €359 million after the first six months. It was also reported that Saab was preparing an application for reconstruction of the company. Again this is as a result of insufficient funds preventing the start of production, payment of employee salaries, and payment of subcontractor debts. In 2011 Saabs Trollhättan plant ended production.

On September 7, Saab Automobile petitioned Swedish court for a voluntary reconstruction. The aim was to protect the company from creditor's claims until Chinese government approval could be completed for a €245 million deal agreed in June 2011 with Pang Da and Zhejiang Youngman Lotus Automobile (Zhejiang Youngman). The following day, the Swedish courts rejected Saabs reconstruction petition, expressing doubt that the automaker could secure the funding necessary to continue.

On September 12, Saab announced that it had signed a technology license agreement worth €70 million with Zhejiang Youngman. On the same day, it became known that the trade unions Unionen and Swedish Organization for Managers (Ledarna) submitted the application requesting that Saab be put into liquidation. Saab Automobile confirmed through a press release that the trade unions had petitioned for bankruptcy supervision of the company.

On September 22, Saab Automobile AB and its subsidiaries Saab Automobile Powertrain AB and Saab Automobile Tools AB (collectively Saab Automobile) received approval for their proposal for voluntary reorganization from the Court of Appeal in Gothenburg, Sweden.

On 28 October, media reports stated that the Chinese carmaker Youngman and the Chinese automotive retailer Pang Da had agreed to a joint US$140 million takeover of Saab Automobile and its UK dealer network unit from Swedish Automobile, with Youngman and Pang Da taking 60 and 40 percent stakes respectively.

On 6 December, GM announced that it would not continue its licenses to GM patents and technology to Saab if the company had been sold to Pang Da and Zhejiang Youngman, stating that the new owner's use of the technology is not in the best interest of GM investors. This was somewhat ironic since most of the patents in question were Saabs in origin but surrendered to GM's ownership back in 2000. Because of this, Saab started working on a new proposal which would not change the original ownership structure and would not include a Chinese partner as an owner of the company, but instead as a 50% owner of a new daughter company.

On 19 December 2011 with no alternatives left after GM continued to block any form of involvement with a Chinese partner, Saab officially filed for bankruptcy after a three-year fight for survival. Under Sweden's bankruptcy laws, a party that files for bankruptcy can be bought out of bankruptcy. Therefore, this was not the end of Saab.

== 2012 ==
In the aftermath, both Saab's CEO Victor Muller and Saab's manager of government relations, Anna Petre, stated that the original deal with Pang Da and Youngman that would have given the two Chinese companies 54% of Saab's parent company, Swedish Automobile (SWAN), was cleared with GM. The turbulence created by Saab's administrator, Guy Lofalk, leading the Chinese to believe they could take a 100% ownership, and the subsequent bid for 100% of SWAN, supposedly severely hurt the relationship with GM. Muller blamed Guy Lofalk for the collapse of the talks. He claimed that Lofalk had led the Chinese investors to believe they could become sole owners of the company. Muller also said he [Lofalk] knew that sole ownership was impossible. GM's had strong concerns about licenses. "Until this problem arose the relationship with GM was excellent," Muller said.

There is some doubt as to the validity of both Muller and Petre's opinions. Both General Motors and Guy Lofalk have denied their claims. General Motors also refute Mullers statements that they approved his sale of Saab to Chinese parties.

Since 26 January 2010 Saab was managed by the board, with Victor Muller presiding.

Victor Muller, as CEO of Spyker cars, is now suing General Motors and claims it is accountable for the bankruptcy of Saab. Muller said: "Ever since we were forced to file for Saab Automobile’s bankruptcy in December of last year, we have worked relentlessly on the preparation for this lawsuit which seeks to compensate Spyker and Saab for the massive damages we have incurred as a result of GM’s unlawful actions". Obviously Muller changed his opinion and now blames General Motors instead of Guy Lofalk. In June 2013 the claim was dismissed by a US federal judge.

On 29 January 2012 the receivers handling Saab's bankruptcy stated that discussions were being held with four or five interested parties with the intention of buying Saab out of bankruptcy. Parties that publicly showed interest were China's Youngman, Indian Mahindra and Mahindra and the Turkish private equity firm Brightwell Holdings. On 14 February 2012 the receivers of the bankruptcy let the press know that there were now six or seven interested parties to buy Saab as a whole and restart production of Saab vehicles and that they aimed to have a final candidate before the end of February. On March 6, 2012, three companies placed bids for complete Saab Automobile buy out; Mahindra and Mahindra and Youngman with bids in the region of US$300m-400m, and Tata Motors with an alleged bid of US$350m, which was later denied.

On April 10, 2012, many documents regarding the bankruptcy became official and the deadline for final bids of Saab Automobile was reached. Since the first reconstruction in 2009, Saab had gathered a debt of approximately €1.3 billion. The total value of all assets was found to be approximately €360m. The potential sale of Saab would therefore mean that many with claims on Saab Automobile would not be paid. GM's claim of approximately €220m would be prioritized because it consisted of preference shares. The handful of previous interested parties in buying Saab Automobile out of bankruptcy were confirmed to have handed in final bids and were all intending to produce Saab cars in Trollhättan in one form or another. The receivers hoped to have a deal done before summer. The receivers also found that the sale of the Saab Automobile property in the summer of 2011 may not have been legitimate and the property may have to be returned to Saab.

On 16 April 2012, a meeting on Saab's bankruptcy was held at the District Court of Vänersborg. The official receivers in charge of the Saab liquidation valued the assets at US$500m and the debt at US$2,000m. After subtracting the value of the assets, Saab leaves a debt of US$1,500m.

On 29 May 2012, Saab AB (aerospace and defence company) CEO Håkan Buskhe spoke to the media for the first time in an interview regarding the bankruptcy of Saab Automobile. Saab AB has the rights to the name Saab Automobile and has the possibility to block the use of the name for any potential buyer of Saab Automobile. Buskhe said that as long as any potential buyer would continue production and development in Trollhättan Saab AB would grant the use of the name but that it will block any deal with a buyer who had the intent of taking production and development outside Sweden. It was also mentioned that Saab AB has strategic partnerships with one of the interested parties in buying Saab Automobile, Indian Mahindra, regarding aerospace and defence and that Saab AB is trying to sell its Jas 39 Gripen fighter jet to India. However, Buskhe did not want to comment on Mahindra's offer on Saab Automobile.

On 6 August 2012, Spyker, represented by the law firm Patton Boggs filed a lawsuit against General Motors in the United States District Court of the Eastern District of Michigan claiming US$3 billion in damages for the actions GM took in the fall of 2011 to stop the various proposed deals between Spyker and Youngman concerning Saab Automobile where Youngman claimed to be ready to invest several billion dollars in Saab Automobile to guarantee its future. More precisely, under the Automotive Technology License Agreement (ATLA) between GM Global Technology Operations Inc (GTO) and Saab, GM refused licensing of the platforms and technology in Saab cars if any Chinese party would be involved in Saabs ownership structure. To solve this issue, Spyker and Youngman came up with a deal where Youngman would provide Saab with a loan of €200 million which would be converted into an equity interest in Saab only after Saab ceased using GM technology in its vehicles. Despite this, GM maintained that it would still refuse licensing of platforms and technology needed for production of Saab cars in Trollhättan and also threatened to cease 9-4X production at GM's plant in Mexico, should the deal go through. Consequently, the deal finally collapsed and Saab was forced to file for bankruptcy. According to Spyker, the actions taken by GM were not legal. Since Saab had been in receivership since the bankruptcy, and would be until the deal with Nevs was closed, Spyker and the receivers of Saab Automobile had entered into an agreement where Spyker would bear the costs of the litigation in exchange for 90% of the claim if the case is successful.

== 2013 ==
In June 2013, the district court dismissed the lawsuit, ruling that General Motors was within its rights to block the sale. Saab was purchased by National Electric Vehicle Sweden in June 2012, with production of the Saab 9-3 resuming in December 2013.

== 2014 ==
A Swedish book, Saabs sista strid, was published on August 28, 2014. The book chronicles Saab Automobile under Spyker Cars and the road to bankruptcy. The author is Swedish financial journalist Jens B Nordström.

== See also ==
- Saab Automobile
- Spyker Cars
- General Motors
- National Electric Vehicle Sweden
