= Hummer HX =

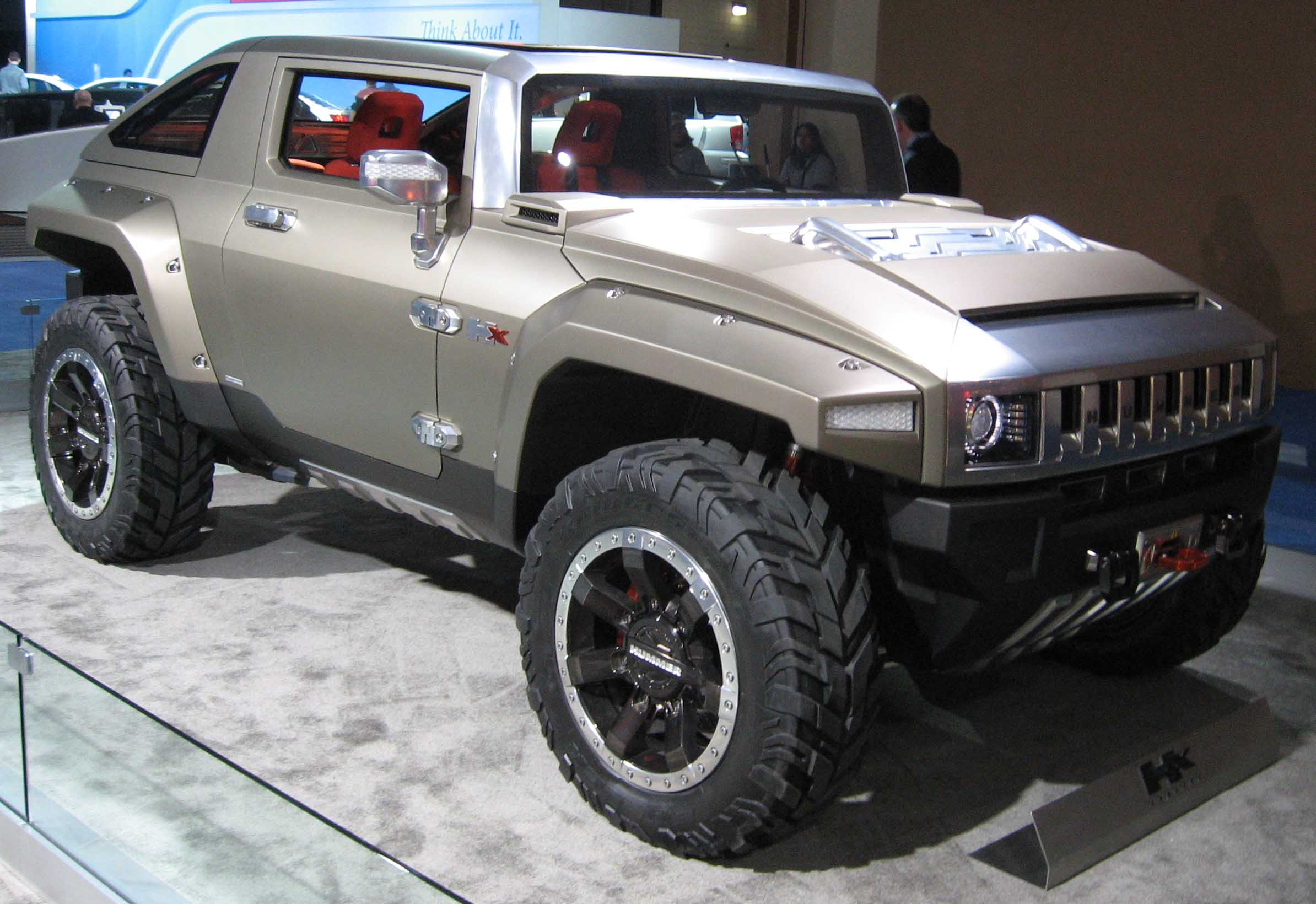

Overview
- Manufacturer: General Motors
- Production: 2008

Body and chassis
- Class: Concept car
- Body style: 2-door SUV
- Layout: Front engine, four-wheel drive

Powertrain
- Engine: 3.6 L V6
- Transmission: 6-speed automatic

Dimensions
- Wheelbase: 2,616 mm (103.0 in)
- Length: 4,343 mm (171.0 in)
- Width: 2,057 mm (81.0 in)
- Height: 1,829 mm (72.0 in)

The Hummer HX is a two-door off-road concept compact SUV that was revealed at the 2008 North American International Auto Show by General Motors.

== Design ==
The objective of the HX concept car project was to potentially market a Hummer branded vehicle in the smaller-sized and lower priced SUV market segments. Development of the vehicle, dubbed H4, began in 2004 and the new model was to be Jeep Wrangler sized.

The 2008 HX show car was smaller than both the H2 and H3. It featured a 3.6 L (220 cu in) V6 engine mated to a six-speed automatic transmission. The HX shared with other Hummers a body-on-frame design, with front and rear independent suspensions, four-wheel-disc brakes, and full-time four-wheel drive.

The HX was shown with a slant-back configuration, wearing a desert-inspired matte olive paint scheme, and featured removable doors with exposed hinge pins and removable composite fender flares that are attached with quarter-turn quick-release fasteners.

The exterior's matte olive color was also applied to the interior's largely sheet metal-covered panels. The floor was a rubberized material. The HX seats four, with a pair of bucket-type seats in the second row. The rear seats are removable to allow cargo room. The console included a compartment for phones and MP3 players with no conventional radio, only integrated speakers and a connector for digital players or similar devices.

Three designers, recent graduates of College for Creative Studies who were new to General Motors, Robert Jablonski; Kang Min-young, a South Korea native; and David Rojas, a native of Peru, participated in the development of the Hummer HX.

== Production Through MEV ==
The Hummer HX never reached production through GM; however, MEV (My Electric Vehicle) won exclusive rights to the Hummer HX brand. MEV produces the Hummer HX as a small electric vehicle with similar proportions to the original HX concept although significantly smaller and is intended as a resort vehicle/golf cart. It utilizes a 72v drive system, powering an AC brushless motor, giving a range of 60+ miles and top speed of 19mph. MEV also produces the Hummer HXT, which is a soft-top version of their HX.
