= Equity issuance =

Sale of new shares to raise capital

An equity issuance or equity issue is the sale of new equity or capital stock by a firm to investors. Equity issuance can involve a private sale, in which the transaction between investors and the firm takes place directly, or publicly, in which case the firm has to register the securities with the authorities and the sale takes place in an organized market, open to any registered investor, a process more akin to an auction. Two common types of public equity issuance are initial public offerings (IPOs) and secondary equity offerings (SEOs or FO). This is one of the ways firms finance themselves, that is, they obtain funds from investors in order to engage in business.

== Role of investment banks ==
Investment banks such as Goldman Sachs or Morgan Stanley are frequently intermediaries in the equity issue process, and for some of these firms the fees associated with IPOs are a substantial part of their income. The role of these banks is to study the characteristics and business plans of the firm which is issuing equity and then recommend a minimum purchase price to investors. On the other hand, they are in charge of convincing investors that the purchase is a good opportunity and therefore the success of IPO placement partly hinges on the reputation of the investment bank that is doing it.

Often it is done by joint stock companies to raise money.

== Types of equity issuance ==
Public equity issuance commonly includes initial public offerings (IPOs), in which a company first offers shares to the public, and seasoned or follow-on offerings, in which a company whose securities already trade publicly issues additional shares.

Seasoned equity offerings may take the form of a cash offer to the market or a rights offering to existing shareholders. Nasdaq defines a seasoned new issue of common stock as a new issue after the company’s securities have previously been issued, and notes that such an issue may be conducted as either a cash offer or a rights offer.

In addition to traditional IPOs, companies may also become publicly traded through direct listings, in which shares begin trading on an exchange without a conventional underwritten public offering.

== See also ==
- Thomson Financial league tables
- Underwriting
