= Robert Gerber =

Robert E. Gerber is a former United States Bankruptcy Court judge from the Southern District of New York, who presided over the General Motors bankruptcy of June 2009. Gerber previously presided over the bankruptcy of Adelphia Communications Corporation and Ames Department Stores. Gerber served in that office from 2000 to 2016.

Judge Gerber earned a B.S. degree from Rutgers University in 1967 and a J.D. degree from Columbia Law School in 1970.

Prior to his appointment in 2000, he was a partner in the New York City law firm of Fried, Frank, Harris, Shriver & Jacobson, where he specialized in securities and commercial litigation and, thereafter, bankruptcy litigation and counseling.

In 2012, a trust representing unsecured creditors of "old" GM filed a lawsuit (which came under Gerber's purview) against GM over payments made to hedge funds in 2009 in exchange for waiving of claims against GM's Canadian subsidiary. The challenge threatened (unsuccessfully) to reopen the 2009 case.

Gerber presided over the bankruptcy of LyondellBasell. Though the company emerged from bankruptcy in 2010, claims of fraudulent conveyance by the litigation trust representing unsecured creditors against individual former shareholders, employees, and management of LyondellBasell are still pending as of early 2013.

After leaving the court, Gerber joined the New York law firm of Joseph Hage Aaronson, and taught as an adjunct professor of Law at Columbia.
