= Hummer =

Vehicle nameplate sold under GMC

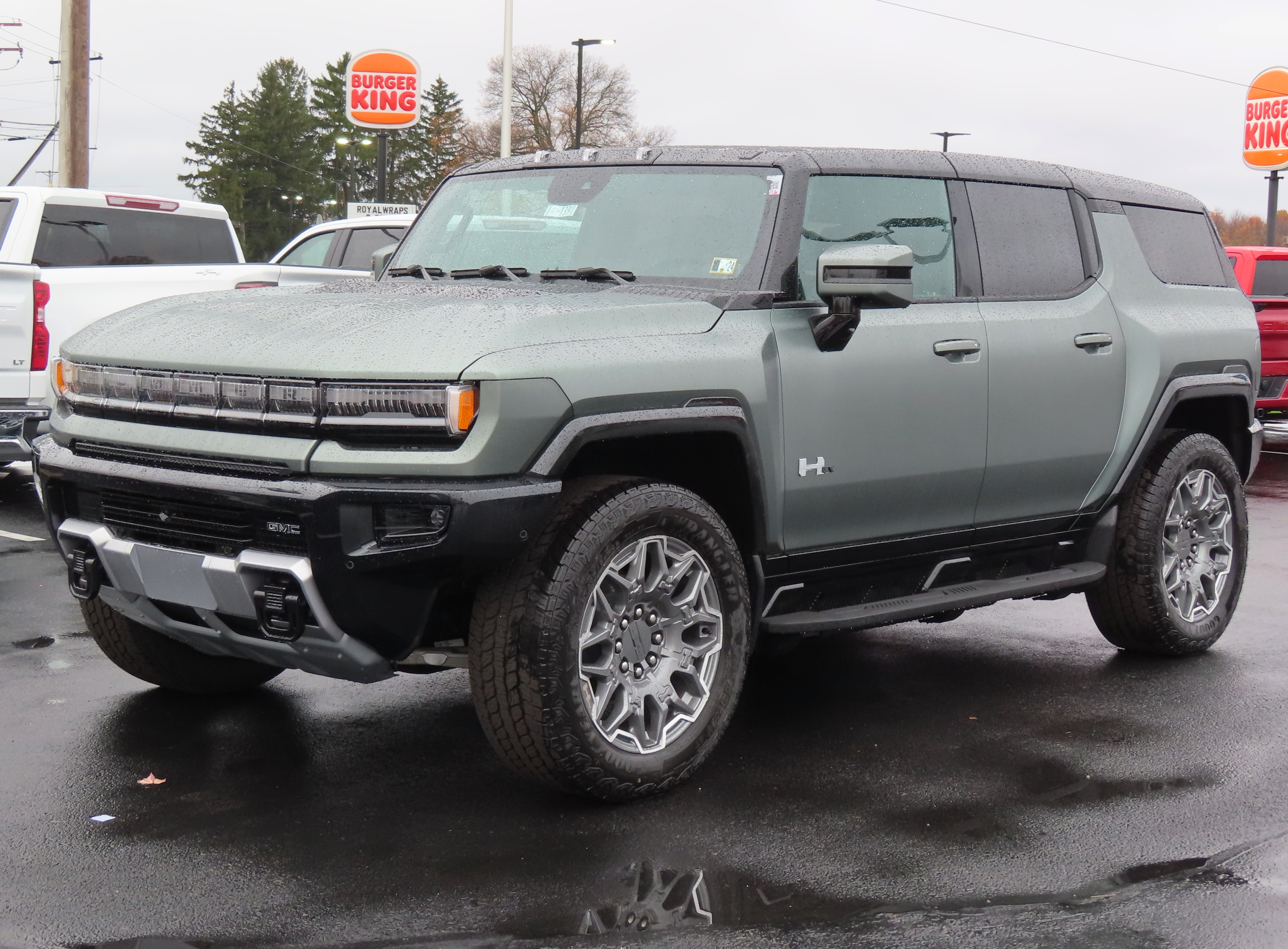
- 2024 GMC Hummer EV3X SUV
- Product type: SUVs
- Current owner: General Motors
- Produced by: General Motors
- Country: United States
- Introduced: 1992; 34 years ago
- Markets: Worldwide
- Previous owners: AM General (until 1999)
- Website: gmc.com/hummer-ev

Hummer (stylized in all caps) is an American brand of pickups and SUVs launched in 1992 when AM General began selling a civilian version of the M998 Humvee. Although discontinued in 2010, Hummer returned as a model under GMC in 2020. In 1998, General Motors (GM) purchased the brand name from and marketed three vehicles: the original Hummer H1, based on the military Humvee, as well as the new H2 and H3 models, which were based on smaller, civilian-market GM platforms.

By 2008, Hummer's viability in the economic downturn was questioned. Rather than being transferred to the Motors Liquidation Company as part of the GM bankruptcy in 2009, the brand was retained by GM, to investigate its sale. No final deal was made, and in 2010, Hummer dealerships began shutting down.

The nameplate returned to the marketplace for the 2022 model year, not as a separate brand but as an electric pickup truck and an SUV, both sold under the GMC brand as the "GMC Hummer EV". The pre-production versions of the EV began in November 2021, after a $2.2 billion investment to build a variety of all-electric vehicles in GM's Detroit-Hamtramck assembly plant.

== History ==
=== Origin ===
AM General had planned to sell a civilian version of its Humvee as far back as the late 1980s. Having the same structure and most mechanical components, the civilian Hummers were finished in automotive gloss paint, adding passenger car enhancements such as air conditioning, sound insulation, upgraded upholstery, stereo systems, wood trim, and convenience packages. The civilian model began in part because of the persistence of Arnold Schwarzenegger, who saw an Army convoy while filming Kindergarten Cop in Oregon and began to campaign and lobby for a civilian version to be available on the market.

In 1992, AM General began selling a civilian version of the M998 Humvee vehicle to the public under the brand name "Hummer". The first two Hummer H1s to be sold were purchased by Schwarzenegger.

=== GM purchase ===
In December 1999, AM General sold the brand name to General Motors but continued to manufacture the vehicles. GM was responsible for the marketing and distribution of all civilian Hummers produced by AM General. Shortly thereafter, GM introduced two of its own design models, the H2 and H3, and renamed the original vehicle H1. AM General continued to build the H1 until it was discontinued in 2006 and was contracted by GM to produce the H2. The H3 was built in Shreveport, LA, alongside the Chevrolet Colorado and GMC Canyon pickups, with which it shared the GMT-355 platform (modified and designated GMT-345). Hummer dealership buildings featured an oversized half Quonset Hut style roof, themed to the Hummer brand's military origins.

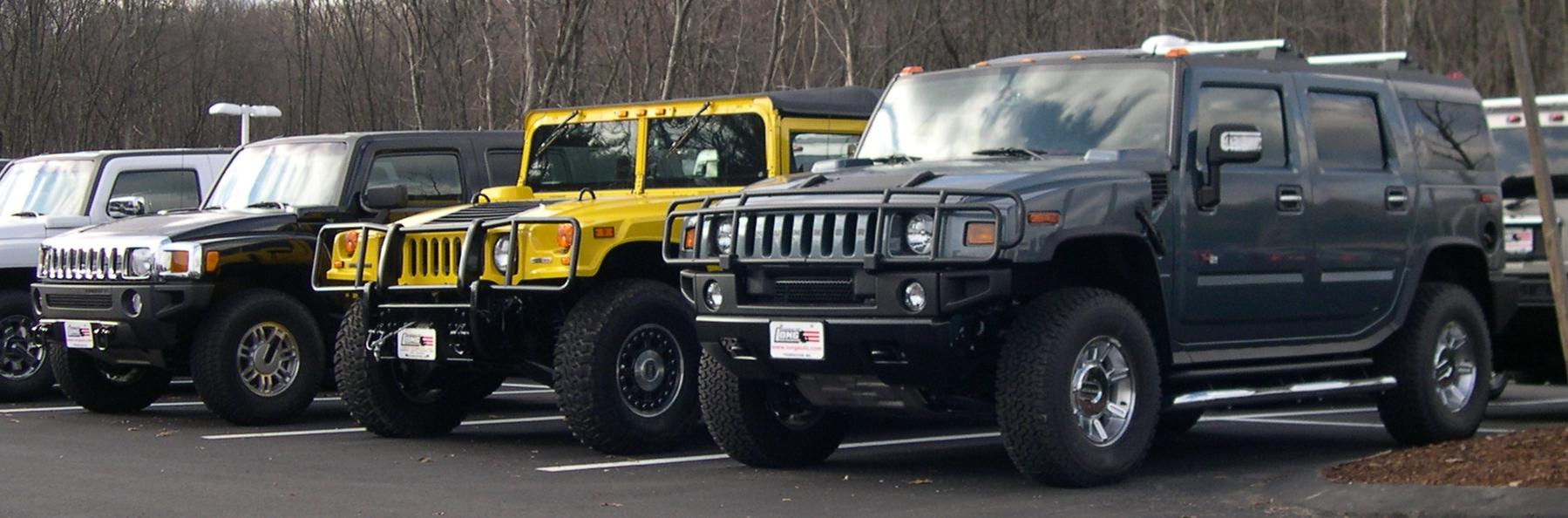
From left: Hummer H3, H1, and H2 models

By 2006, the Hummer began to be exported and sold through importers and distributors in 33 countries. On October 10, 2006, GM began producing the Hummer H3 at its Port Elizabeth plant in South Africa for international markets. The Hummers built there at first were only left-hand drive, but right-hand drive versions were added and exported to Australia and other markets.

The H2 was also assembled in Kaliningrad, Russia, by Avtotor, starting in 2006 and ending in 2009. The plant produced a few hundred vehicles annually, and its output was limited to local consumption with five dealers in Russia.

On June 3, 2008, one day prior to GM's annual shareholder meeting, Rick Wagoner, GM's CEO at that time, said the brand was being reviewed and would possibly be sold, have the production line completely redesigned, or be discontinued. This was due to the decreasing demand for large SUVs as a result of higher oil prices. Almost immediately after the announcement, a pair of Indian automakers, including Mahindra & Mahindra, expressed interest in purchasing all or part of Hummer.

In April 2009, GM President Fritz Henderson stated several interested parties had approached GM regarding the Hummer business.

=== Failed sale and shutdown ===
On June 1, 2009, as a part of the General Motors bankruptcy announcement, the company revealed that the Hummer brand would be discontinued. However, the following day GM announced that instead it had reached a deal to sell the brand to an undisclosed buyer. After GM announced that same day that the sale was to an undisclosed Chinese company, CNN and The New York Times identified the buyer of the Hummer truck unit as China-based Sichuan Tengzhong Heavy Industrial Machinery Company Ltd. Later that day, Sichuan Tengzhong itself announced the deal on their own website.

On January 6, 2010, GM CEO Ed Whitacre said he hoped to close the deal with Tengzhong by the end of that month. On February 1, 2010, it was announced that Sichuan and General Motors had agreed to extend the deadline until the end of February as Sichuan tried to get approval by the Chinese government. It was also revealed that the price tag of the Hummer brand was $150 million.

Later, on February 24, 2010, GM announced the Tengzhong deal had collapsed and the Hummer brand would soon shut down. There were reports that Sichuan Tengzhong might pursue the purchase of the Hummer brand from GM by purchasing it privately through the company's new J&A Tengzhong Fund SPC, a private equity investment fund owned by an offshore entity that was recruiting private investors to buy into its acquisition plan. The financial markets posed problems for established borrowers and even more for Tengzhong, a little-known company from western China, at the same time as the potential value of the Hummer brand continued to decline, given high fuel prices and weak consumer demand.

The company announced it was willing to consider offers for all or part of the assets. American company Raser Technologies along with several others expressed interest in buying the company. However, on April 7, 2010, this attempt failed as well, and General Motors officially said it was shutting down the Hummer SUV brand and offering rich rebates in a bid to move the remaining 2,200 vehicles.

After filling a rental-car fleet order, the last Hummer H3 rolled off the line at Shreveport on May 24, 2010.

=== Revival ===
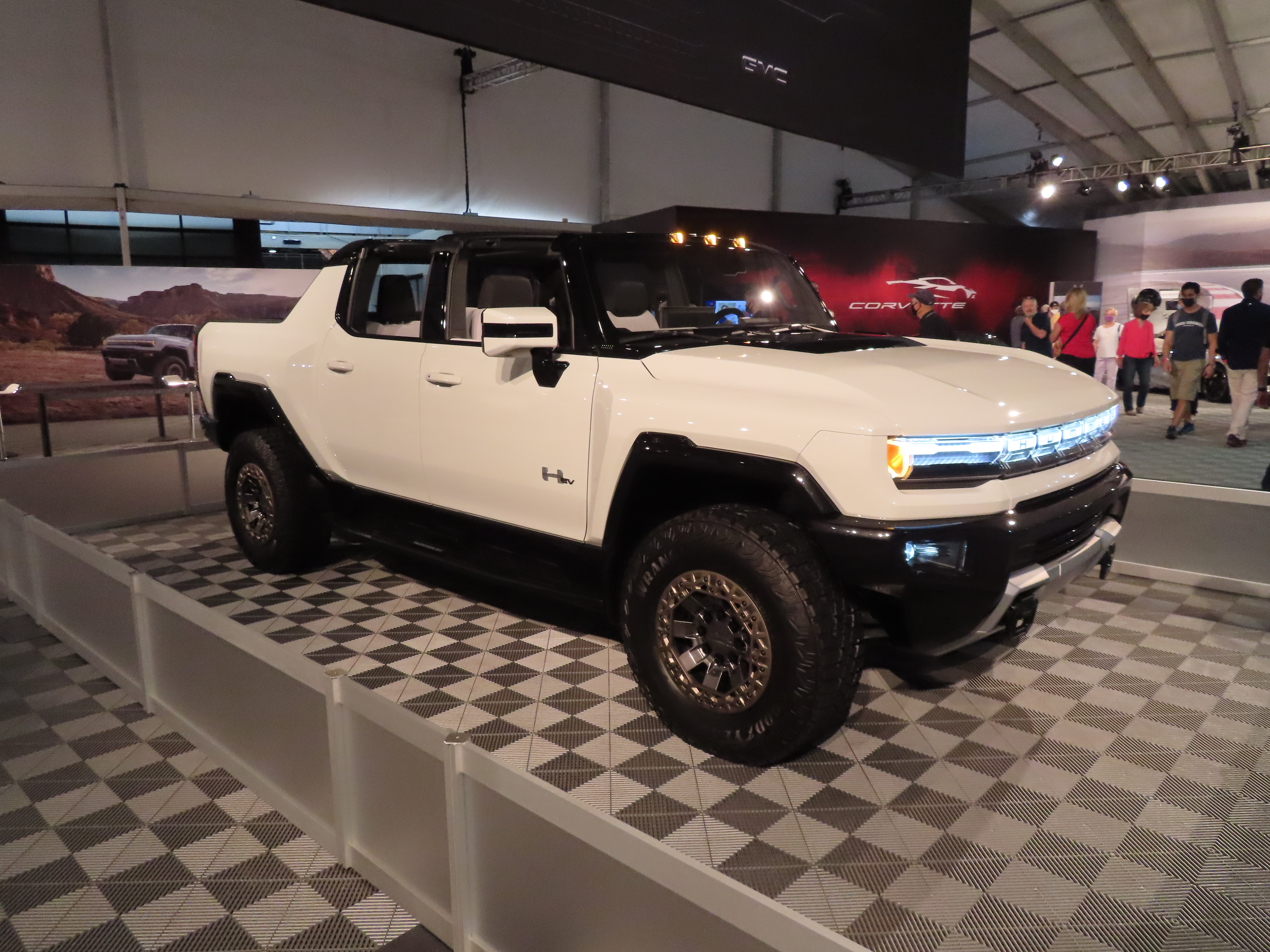
GMC Hummer EV pickup truck

In mid-2019, rumors began to circulate that General Motors was considering reviving the Hummer nameplate in 2021, as the market for off-road vehicles was reaching historic levels of sales. GM President Mark Ruess was asked about the possible return in the summer of 2019 and said, "I love Hummer. I don't know. We're looking at everything." Credibility to the earlier reporting began to solidify after the conclusion of the 2019 General Motors strike, as contract negotiations led to the commitment by GM of saving its Detroit-Hamtramck facility from closing by investing in and retooling it to build future electric trucks and SUVs; the products were to be built on GM's upcoming "BT1" electric truck platform. GM's own documentation listed three brands as receiving products from the BT1 architecture: Cadillac (Escalade IQ), Chevrolet (Silverado EV), and a third unknown brand referred to as the "M-Brand."

Industry insiders claimed they had sources saying that the "M-Brand" was a Hummer, because a revival of the brand with established name recognition would help reduce marketing costs. The Hummer revival on the BT1 platform was known internally as "Project O," potentially named after former Chief Camaro Engineer Al Oppenheiser (the man responsible for the return of the Camaro in 2010), who was moved from Camaro development to overseeing an EV program. Oppenheiser later confirmed this himself. By November 2019, media reports all but confirmed that Hummer would return with two electric models, a truck and an SUV, sometime in 2021. On November 21, 2019, General Motors CEO Mary Barra confirmed that GM would be releasing an electric pickup truck in the fall of 2021, but did not name the brand under which it would be built.

The new Hummer line is not a standalone brand, as it was before General Motors filed for bankruptcy, but a model within GM's GMC brand.

On January 30, 2020, GM released a series of short videos revealing the return of Hummers in the form of electric SUV and truck models marketed under the GMC brand. A 30-second Super Bowl ad featured NBA superstar LeBron James. The vehicle was to be revealed on May 20, 2020, but the date was later pushed back to October 20, 2020.

The Hummer EV SUT was officially revealed on October 20, 2020, during the 2020 World Series. The Hummer EV SUV was unveiled during the NCAA Tournament Final Four on April 3, 2021.

There will be several versions and models under GM brand GMC, with initially only the most expensive "Edition 1" four-door pickup available, followed by other models and later as an SUV.

== Models ==
=== Hummer H1 ===
The first vehicle in the Hummer range was the Hummer H1, based on the Humvee. Released for the civilian market in 1992, this vehicle was designed by American Motors' AM General subsidiary to meet U.S. Military specifications that were issued in 1979. By 1982, Renault (which was partially owned by the French government) took controlling interest in AMC, and the AM General division was sold in 1983 to Ling-Temco-Vought (LTV), because US regulations barred ownership of defense contractors by foreign governments. American Motors itself was acquired by Chrysler in 1987. Production of H1 civilian versions continued throughout 2006.

=== Hummer H2 ===
The Hummer H2 was the second vehicle in the Hummer range built in the AM General facility under contract from General Motors from 2002 to 2009. There were two variations: The H2 SUV and the H2 SUT.

=== Hummer H3 ===
The H3 and H3T pickup truck were the smallest of the Hummer models and were based on the GMT355 platform shared with the Chevrolet Colorado and GMC Canyon compact pickup trucks. The H3 line was produced from 2005 to 2010 by General Motors.

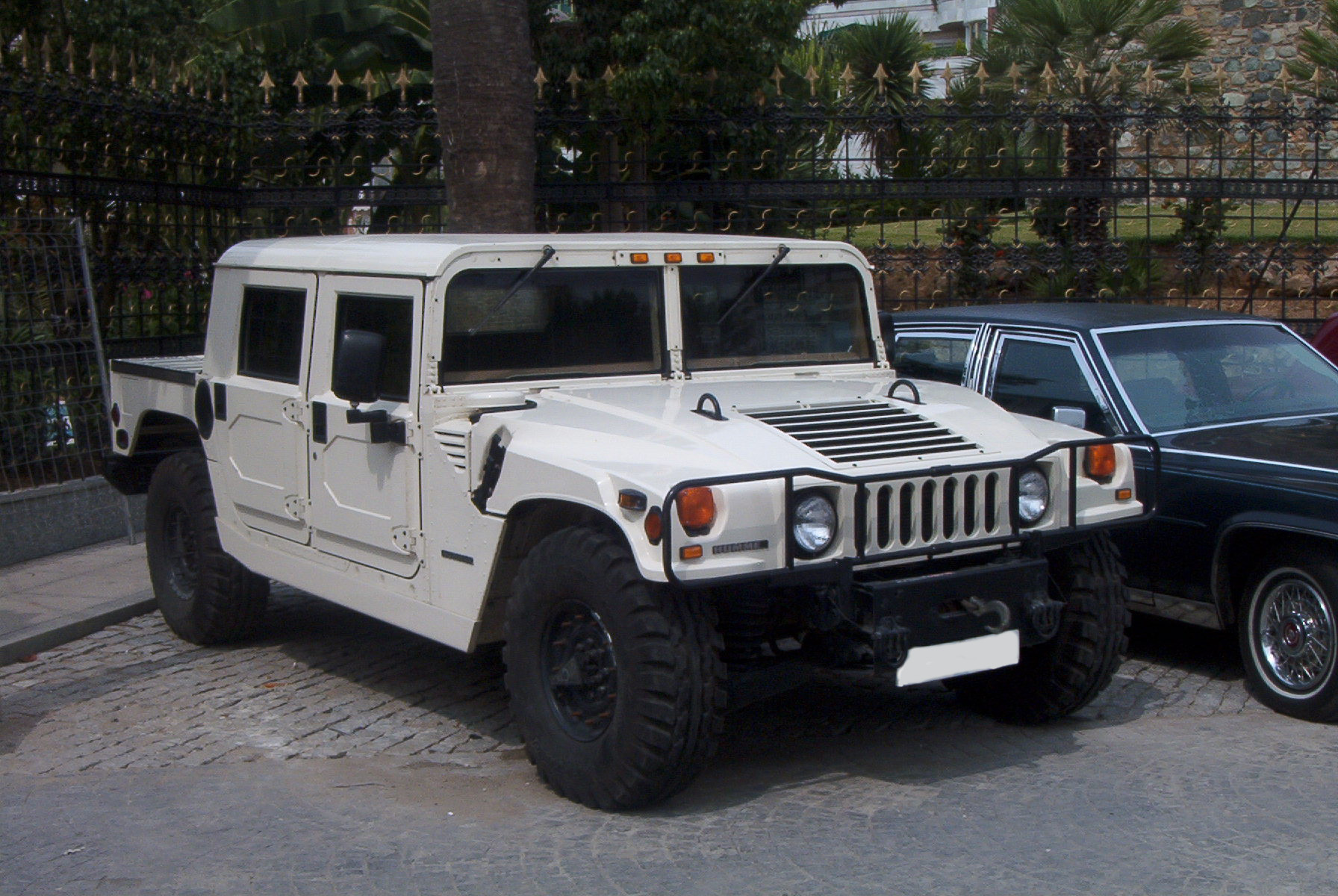
Hummer H1

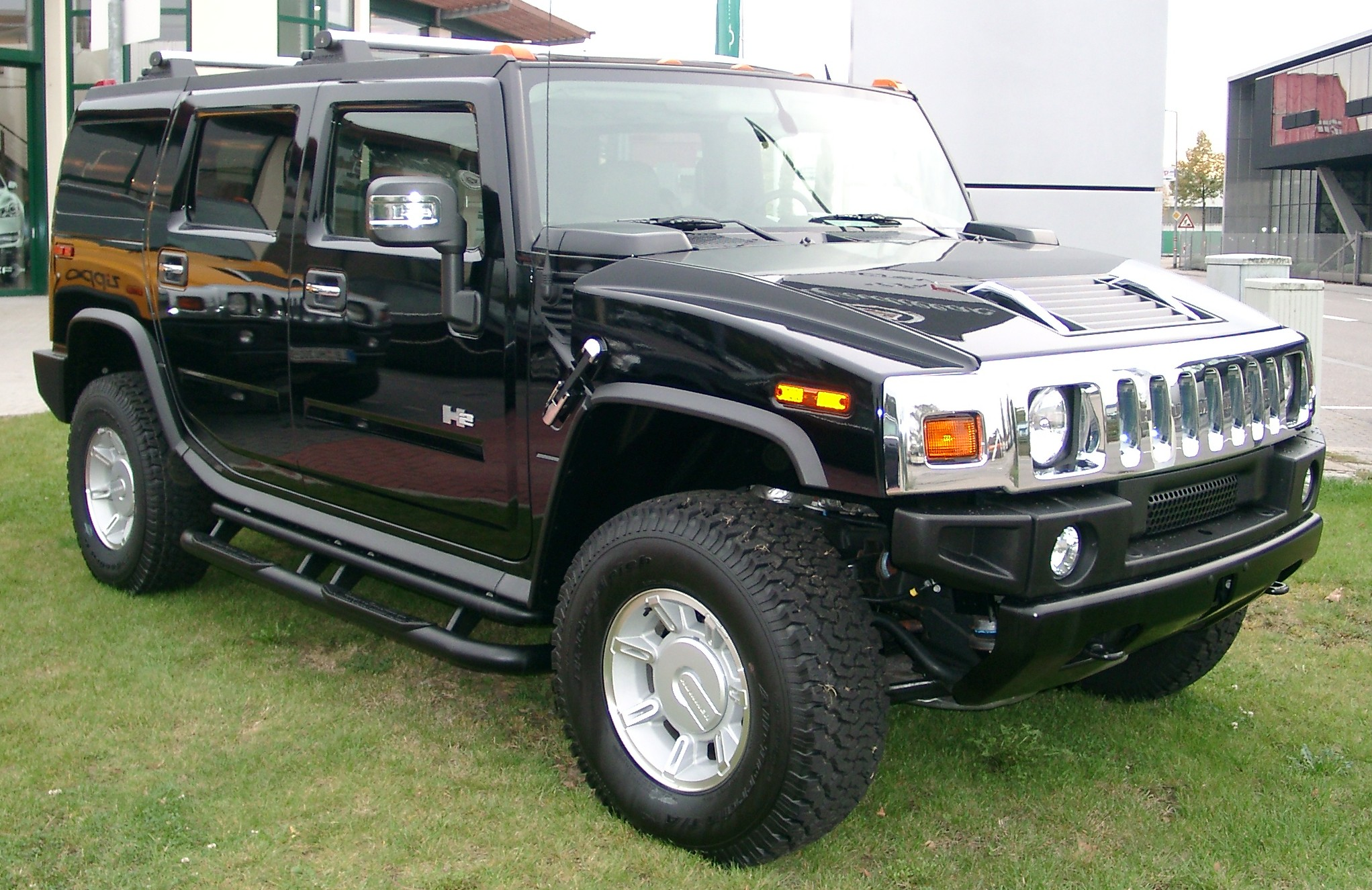
Hummer H2

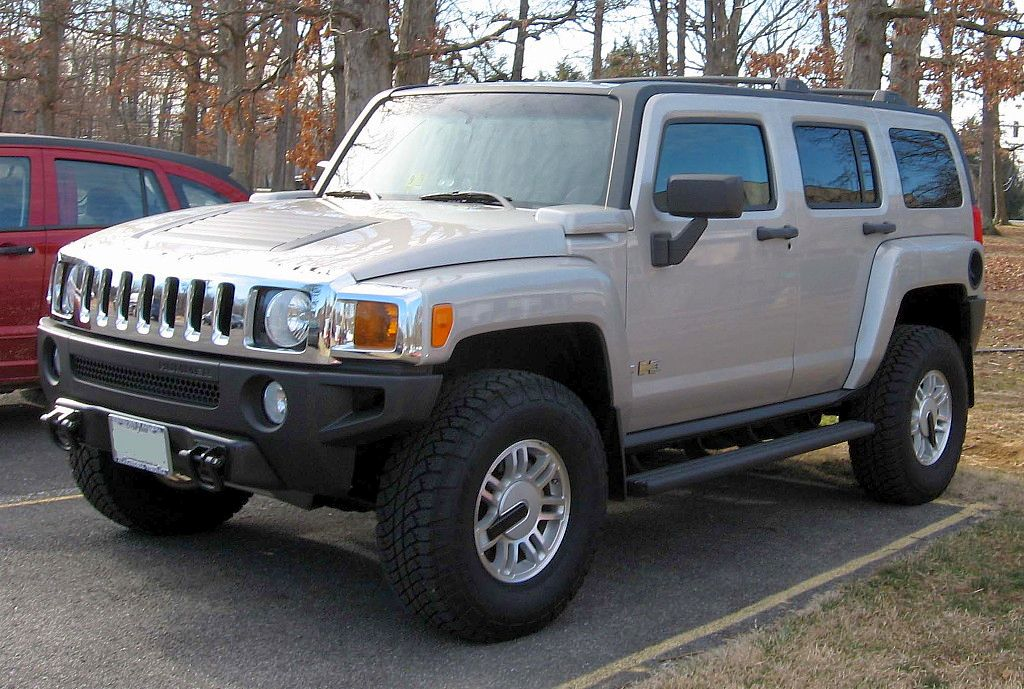
Hummer H3

== Concept vehicles ==
=== Hummer HX ===
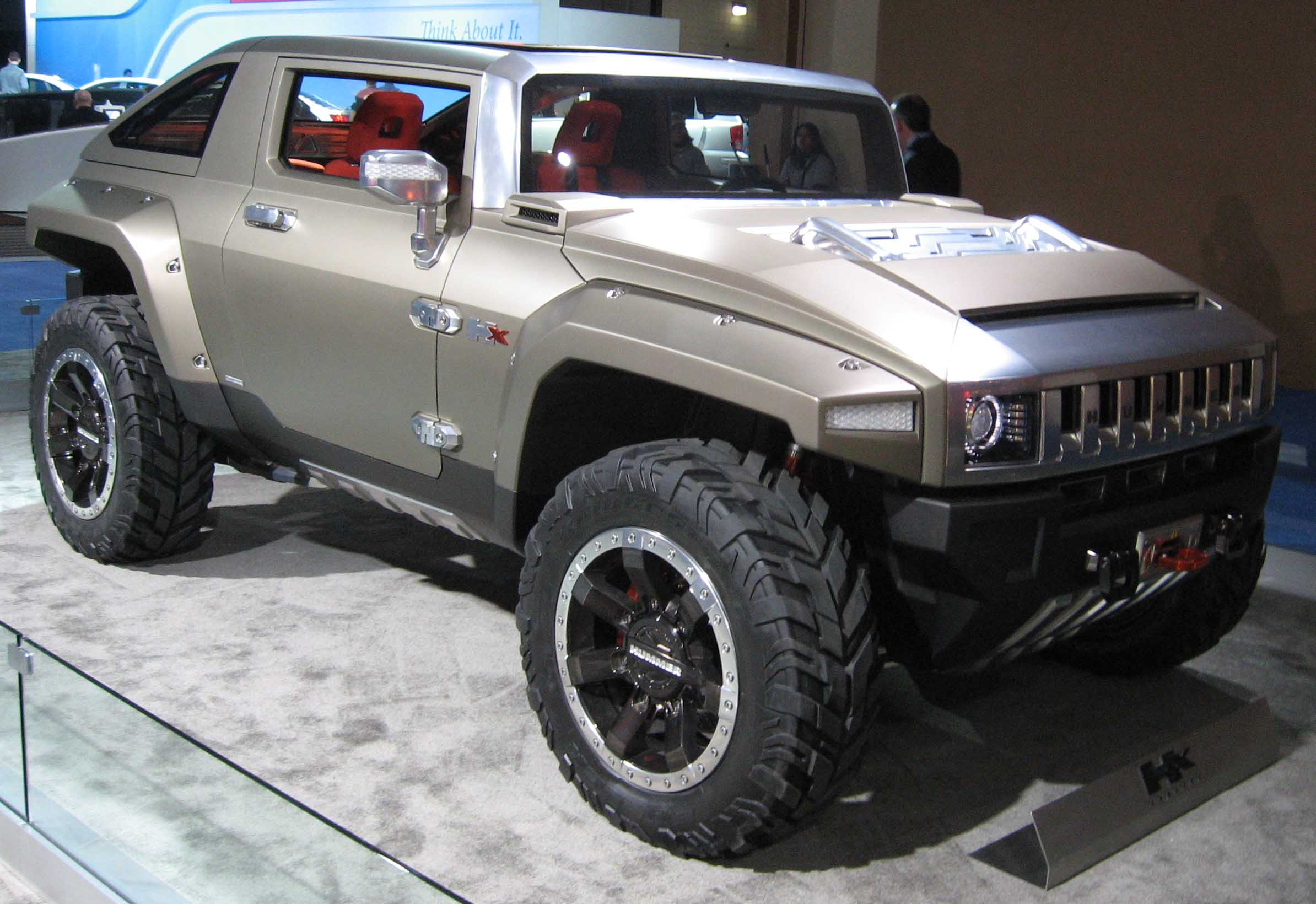
Hummer HX prototype

The Hummer HX was developed in 2008 as an open-air, two-door off-road concept car, smaller than other Hummer models.

=== Plug-in hybrid ===
Raser Technologies (formerly of Utah) was to use technology similar to that of the Chevrolet Volt. The company unveiled the prototype to the 2009 Society of Automotive Engineers World Congress in Detroit. The E-REV (Extended-Range Electric Vehicle) powertrain technology was claimed to power the vehicle for up to 40 miles (64 km) on its battery, and then a small 4-cylinder internal combustion engine would start to generate more electricity.

== Racing ==
Rod Hall in the 2005 Baja 1000

Team Hummer Racing was created in 1993. Led by off-road racer Rod Hall, Team Hummer competed in the stock classes of both BitD and SCORE, with specialized racing shock absorbers, tires, and other modifications, along with mandatory safety equipment. Team Hummer stock-class H3 was driven by Hall who finished first in class with the H3 in the 2005 Baja 1000. Team Hummer earned 11 production-class wins at the Baja 1000.

A highly modified, two-wheel drive Hummer was raced by Robby Gordon in 2006 (did not finish), 2007 (8th place), 2009 (3rd place), 2010 (8th place), 2011 (did not finish), 2012 (disqualified), and 2013 (14th place) Dakar Rally.

== Stretch limousines ==
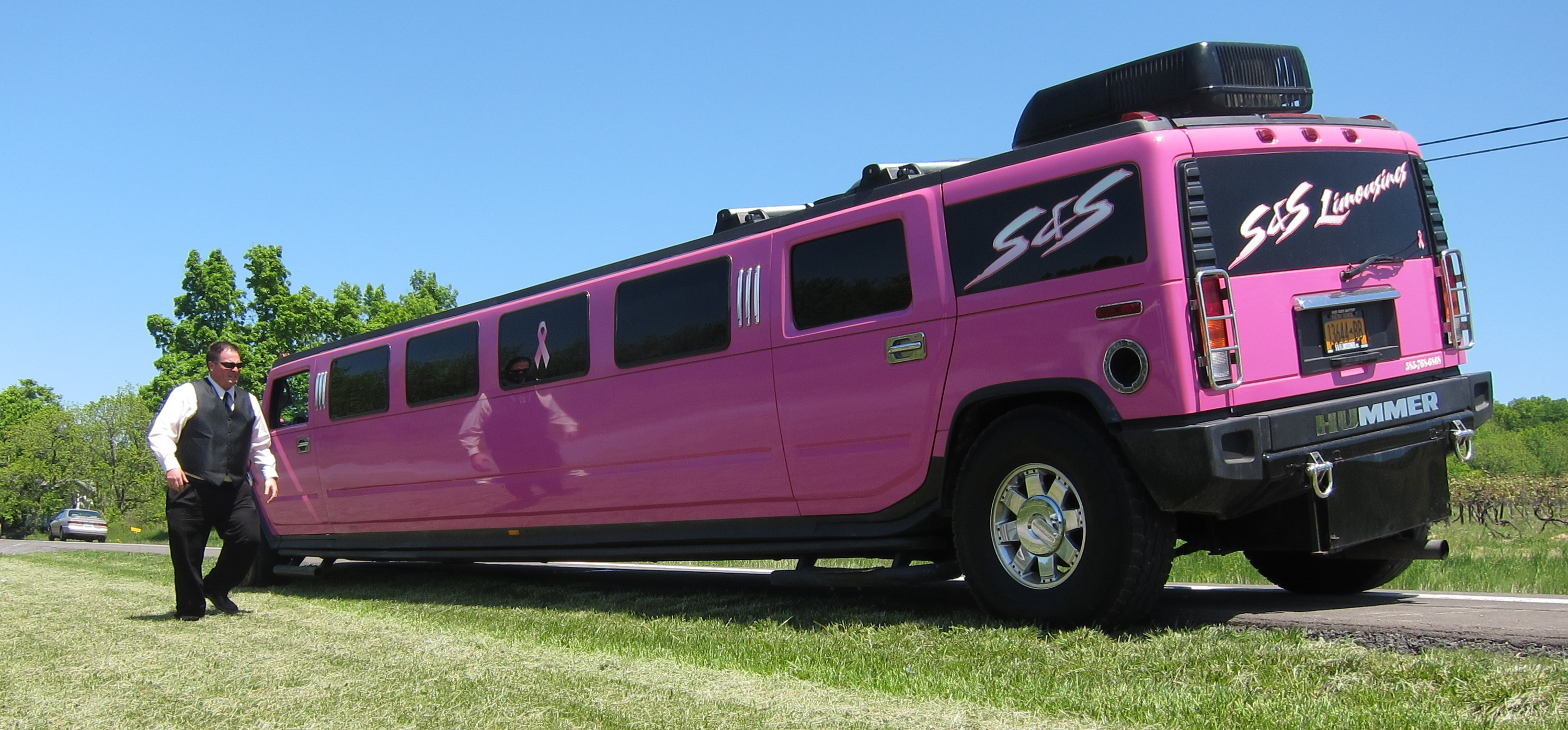
Hummer H2 modified into a limousine

The Hummer H2 has been stretched by third-party companies into a variety of limousine versions. The Hummer H2 was cut behind the cab, and the chassis was extended to create a passenger section for 14, 16, or even 22 passengers. Sometimes the back doors would be replaced with gullwing doors.

== Production ==
- AM General Hummer H1 Assembly Plant, Mishawaka, Indiana – 500,000-square-foot plant (46,000 m^{2}) opened in 1984 to build HMMWV (HUMVEE) and began production of the H1 in 1992. Production ceased 2006, but HMMWV production continues.
- AM General Hummer H2 Assembly Plant, Mishawaka, Indiana – 673,000-square-foot plant (62,500 m^{2}) opened 2002. H2 production ended 2009. Plant sold to SF Motors, maker of electric vehicles, in 2017.
- General Motors South Africa Struandale Assembly Plant, Port Elizabeth, Eastern Cape, South Africa – built in 1996, expanded to 75,625 square meters (814,000 sq ft) to build H3 models. H3 production ended 2009.
- General Motors Shreveport Operations, Shreveport, Louisiana – in 2005, to accommodate the production of the H3, an additional 296,000 square feet (27,500 m^{2}) was added to plant built by GM in 1981. In July 2009, GM had shut down Hummer production of the H3, but the automaker had a special fleet order from Avis Rent a Car System.
- Avtotor Kaliningrad, Russia – licensed version of H2 starting from 2006 and production ended in 2009.

== Criticisms ==
Criticism of Hummers mirrors the criticism of SUVs in general, but to a higher degree. Specific criticisms of Hummers include:

Size
Hummers (specifically the H1 and H2) are significantly bigger than other SUVs, which can cause problems parking, driving, and fitting in a garage. Their large size may also pose a serious threat to smaller vehicles and pedestrians.

Poor fuel economy
Even compared to other heavy passenger vehicles, Hummers have very poor fuel economy. Because the H2 is built to the over-8500-lb GVW, its fuel economy is neither published by the U.S. EPA nor counted toward Corporate Average Fuel Economy. For example, H2 in one engine configuration averages an estimated 14 mpg_{‑US} (17 L/100 km; 17 mpg_{‑imp}) on the highway and 10 mpg_{‑US} (24 L/100 km; 12 mpg_{‑imp}) in the city. It has a curb weight of around 6,400 lb (2,900 kg).

Safety
Crash data for Hummers is less complete than for other SUVs. As a Class 3 truck, the Hummer is exempt from many United States Department of Transportation safety regulations. The H1 lacks standard safety features, including child safety locks, child seat tethers, side airbags, and stability control. Large blind spots make parking difficult and possibly dangerous.

Drivers
A one-year study, conducted by a firm that provides statistical information to insurance companies, found that drivers of Hummer H2 and H3s receive about five times as many traffic tickets as the national average for all vehicles (standardized based on the number of violations per 100,000 miles driven).

== Licensing ==
GM is active in licensing the Hummer. Various companies have licensed the Hummer trademarks for use on colognes, flashlights, bicycles, shoes, coats, hats, laptops, toys, clothing, CD players, video games and other items. An electric quadricycle badged as a Hummer was produced in the UK.

== See also ==
- GMC Hummer EV
- Humvee
- List of defunct United States automobile manufacturers
- VLF Automotive#HUMVEE C-Series
