= Inter Islands Airlines =

Cape Verdean airline

IATA	ICAO	Call sign
H4	IIN	—
- Commenced operations: 2002
- Ceased operations: 2009
- Headquarters: Cape Verde

Inter Islands Airlines was an airline based in Cape Verde.

== Code data ==
- IATA Code: H4
- ICAO Code: IIN (not current)

== Fleet ==
Operated a leased Embraer Brasilia
