= Voluntary employees' beneficiary association =

A voluntary employees' beneficiary association (VEBA) is a form of trust fund permitted under United States federal tax law, whose sole purpose must be to provide employee benefits. Among the types of benefits which a VEBA may provide are accident insurance benefits, childcare costs, employee continuing education, the cost of legal services, life insurance benefits, severance pay, supplemental unemployment benefits, sick leave pay, training benefits, and vacation pay. A VEBA cannot, however, provide commuter benefits, miscellaneous fringe benefits, or retiree income. The plan may pay benefits to employees, their dependents, or their designated beneficiaries, or to disabled, laid-off, or retired former employees.

The organization must also meet the following additional requirements:

1. It must be a voluntary association of employees;.
2. Substantially all of its operations are for the purpose of providing benefits;
3. Its earnings may not benefit of any private individual, organization, or shareholder other than through the payment of benefits;
4. It must be controlled by its members, in whole or part by their trustees, or by an independent trustee; and
5. It must be nondiscriminatory in the payment of its benefits (unless it was established pursuant to a collective bargaining agreement).

Employer contributions to a VEBA are tax-deductible

Beneficiaries of a VEBA must have an employment-related common bond (such as a common employer), be covered by a collective bargaining agreement, or belong to a labor union. However, if multiple employers share the same line of business and the same geographic area, they are considered to share the "common bond" specified by the law.

A major use of the concept was implemented in 2007 when the United Auto Workers agreed to form VEBAs for their workers at the Big Three automobile manufacturers, thus relieving the companies from carrying the liability for their health plans on their accounting books. The UAW Retiree Medical Benefits Trust, with more than $45 billion in assets as of June 2010, and $58.8 billion as of March 2014, is the world's largest VEBA.
