= United States Bankruptcy Court for the Southern District of New York =

Coordinates: 40.7043°N 74.0141°W

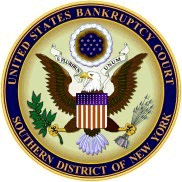
- Location: Alexander Hamilton U.S. Custom House (Manhattan) More locations: White Plains; Poughkeepsie
- Judges: 9
- Chief Judge: Martin Glenn
- nysb.uscourts.gov

The United States Bankruptcy Court for the Southern District of New York is the United States bankruptcy court within the Southern District of New York. The Southern District of New York is a major venue for bankruptcy, as it has jurisdiction over the corporate headquarters and major financial institutions located in Manhattan.

Originally, the District Court itself handled bankruptcies; these and admiralty court cases dominated nearly to the exclusion of all other cases, which were primarily handled by a Circuit Court for the District of New York and its successor Circuit Court for the Southern District of New York, until that court was abolished and its cases handled by the District Court as well. The district became widely recognized for its expertise in handling large bankruptcies, leading companies to seek a way to file in this court. Modern examples include the General Motors Chapter 11 reorganization and the Enron and WorldCom bankruptcies.

From 1980 through 2014, the Southern District Bankruptcy Court for New York handled over 18% of all large, public-company bankruptcy filings in the United States while the Delaware District Bankruptcy Court handled nearly 36%.

== List of judges ==
The following is a list of the bankruptcy judges, as of May 2023, for the United States Bankruptcy Court for the Southern District of New York.

As with all federal bankruptcy judges in the US, judges are appointed by the circuit's court of appeals — in this case, the United States Court of Appeals for the Second Circuit.

Judge	Appointed
Chief Judge Martin Glenn	November 30, 2006
Lisa G. Beckerman	February 26, 2021
Philip Bentley	September 7, 2022
David S. Jones	February 19, 2021
James L. Garrity	February 11, 2015
Cecelia G. Morris	July 1, 2000
John P. Mastando III	August 9, 2022
Sean H. Lane	September 7, 2010
Michael E. Wiles	February 27, 2015
