= Effects of the 2008–2010 automotive industry crisis on the United States =

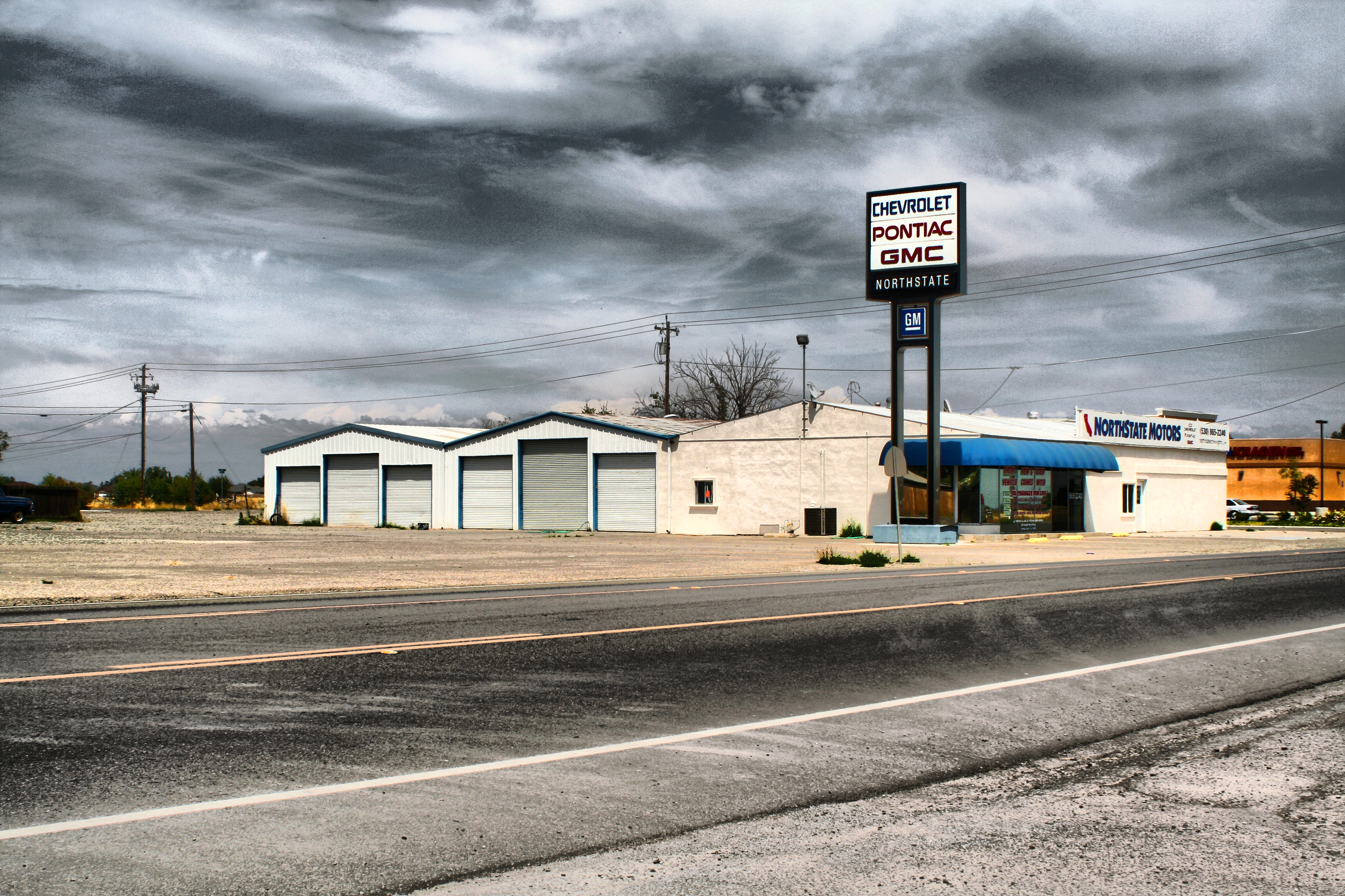
An automobile dealership in Orland, California which closed after General Motors cut ties with it and several hundred other dealers as part of its Chapter 11 bankruptcy restructuring efforts in 2009

Beginning in the latter half of 2008, a global-scale recession adversely affected the economy of the United States. A combination of several years of declining automobile sales and scarce availability of credit led to a more widespread crisis in the United States auto industry in the years of 2008 and 2009.

Following dramatic drops in automobile sales throughout 2008, two of the "Big Three" U.S. automakers – General Motors (GM), and Chrysler – requested emergency loans in order to address impending cash shortages. By April 2009, the situation had worsened such that both GM and Chrysler were faced with imminent bankruptcy and liquidation. With the intent to prevent massive job losses and destabilizing damage to the entire manufacturing sector, the U.S. and Canadian governments provided unprecedented financial bailout ($85 billion) support to allow the companies to restructure and jettison legacy debt via Chapter 11 bankruptcy. Both companies separately filed for this protection by June 1.

General Motors emerged from bankruptcy as a new company majority-owned by the United States Treasury, and Chrysler emerged owned primarily by the United Auto Workers union and by Italian automaker Fiat S.p.A. Both companies terminated agreements with hundreds of their dealerships and GM discontinued several of its brands as part of bankruptcy proceedings. Ford Motor Company was able to survive without entering bankruptcy partly due to a large line of credit which it obtained in 2007.

The U.S. automakers were more heavily affected by the crisis than their foreign counterparts, such as Toyota. Following the 2000s energy crisis, the U.S. automakers failed to produce more fuel-efficient vehicles as opposed to the high-profit sport utility vehicles that were popular in the late 1990s and early 2000s which led to excess inventory and undesirable product. Since the automotive crisis abated, all three American automakers have increased sales of vehicles and have posted a profit.

As of 2012, the industry has recovered to some extent. GM had 2011 sales of more than 9 million vehicles, more than Toyota. According to a May 2011 report by the White House National Economic Council, however, the US government may have to write off about $14 billion of its $80 billion loan.

By 2012, polls from Pew Research Center and Quinnipiac University Polling Institute showed that the American public believed the bailouts were helpful for the American economy.

== Background ==
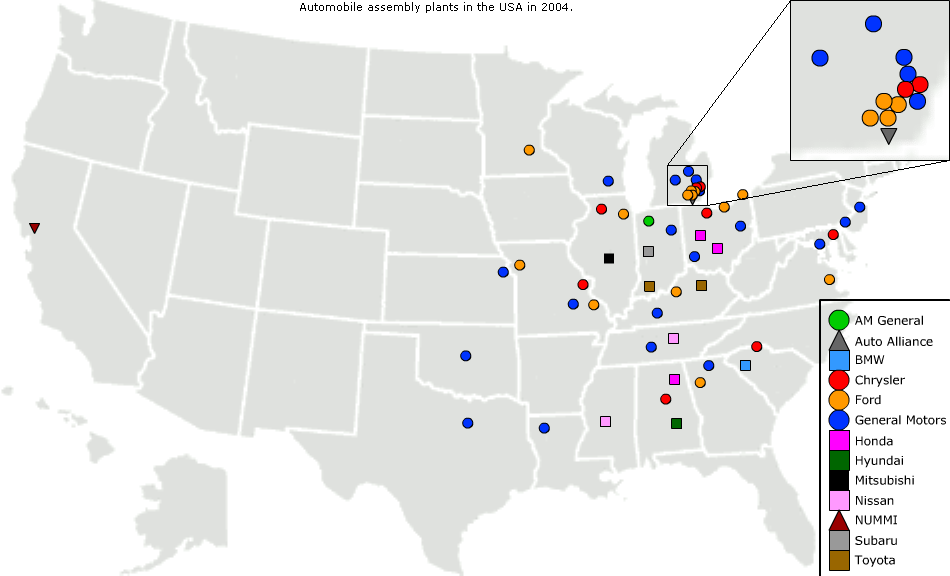
Automobile assembly plants in the United States in 2004

Some note that the crisis occurred mainly as a result of business of the Big Three U.S. automakers which had limited access to offshore production as opposed to their Asian counterparts. Analysts point out that Asian companies that manufacture automobiles mostly in Asia but also in the U.S. were not experiencing similar problems. They were able to produce compact automobiles in the Pacific Rim area for less cost (in Dollars). A December 22, 2008 article in The New York Times stated, "For the most part, the so-called auto transplants – foreign-owned car companies with major operations in the United States – have deep pockets and ample credit, and they are not facing potential bankruptcy like General Motors and Chrysler." Much of the criticism centered on structural differences between the Big Three and the "transplants" (foreign companies manufacturing in U.S.) that result in major cost differentials.

The U.S. Big Three were first weakened by the substantially more expensive automobile fuels linked to the 2003–2008 oil crisis which, in particular, caused customers to turn away from large sport utility vehicles (SUVs) and pickup trucks, the main market of the American "Big Three" (General Motors, Ford, and Chrysler). The U.S. automakers also suffered from considerably higher labor costs than their non-unionized counterparts, including salaries, benefits, healthcare, and pensions. In return for labor peace, management granted concessions to its unions that resulted in uncompetitive cost structures and significant legacy costs. Further, the volume of cars sold in the U.S. was significantly tied to home equity lines of credit, with 24% of sales financed this way in 2006. When the availability of these loans suddenly dried up in 2008 due to the subprime mortgage crisis, vehicle sales declined dramatically, from 17 million in 2006 to 10.6 million in 2009.

In 2006, Consumer Reports reported that all 10 of the cars that it considered to be the 10 best were built by Japanese companies. While Michigan lost 83,000 Big Three auto manufacturing jobs between 1993 and 2008, more than 91,000 new auto manufacturing jobs were created in Alabama, Mississippi, Tennessee, Kentucky, Georgia, North Carolina, South Carolina, Virginia and Texas during that same time period. Note that 83,000 jobs were lost in Michigan and there is not a reference to automotive jobs lost in other states. Center for Automotive Research estimated that for every job created by a foreign transplant, 6.1 jobs were lost by the Big Three.

The support given to General Motors and Chrysler by the Obama administration was initially unpopular, with a March 2009 CNN/Opinion Research Corporation poll finding that only 37% of Americans approved of the actions. A June 2009 Wall Street Journal/NBC News survey found 39% approval.

However, two polls taken three years after the event show that Americans did eventually support the auto bailout. An April 2012 poll by Quinnipiac University Polling Institute shows that 53% of American voters support the bailout, and 50% believe it has been a success. A Pew Research Center poll from February 2012 shows that 56% of adults polled now believe that the government giving loans to General Motors and Chrysler was "good for the economy".

== Industry and labor statistics ==
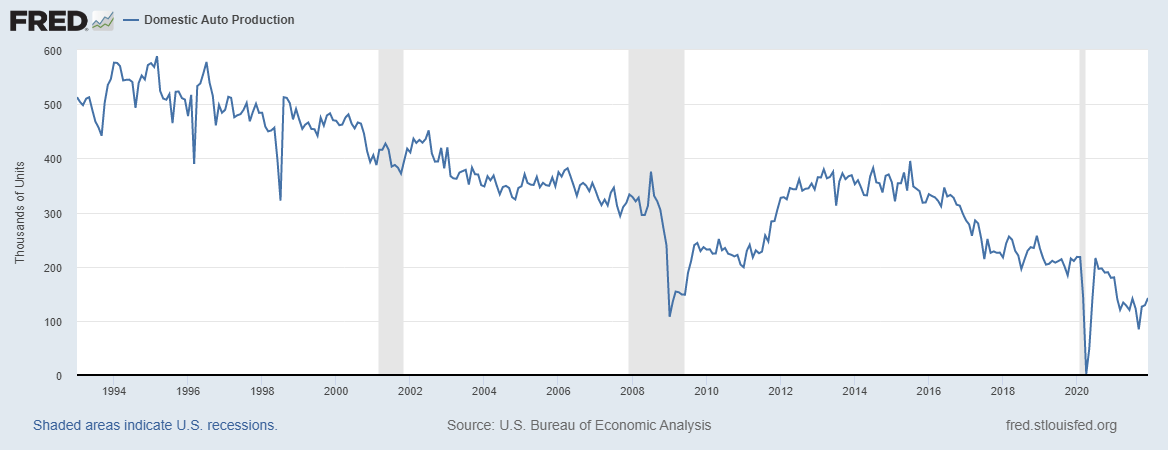
US automobile manufacturing, 1993–2021

At the time, the Big Three employees, parts-supplier employees and car-dealer employees totaled approximately 1.6 million. All auto-related industries and after-market service businesses employed approximately 3.1 million people in the United States. The U.S. Bureau of Labor Statistics breaks down the workers into the following segments, as of September 2008: Parts manufacturing-504,000; Repair operations-864,000; Wholesale operations-340,000; Dealer operations-1.2 million; and Manufacturing-114,000. GM directly employs 123,000 in all of North America. An estimated two million people relied on the industry for health care and 775,000 retirees collect auto-industry pensions.

=== Hourly wages and benefits ===
Gary Burtless of the Brookings Institution argued that hourly wages were similar between the Big Three and the transplants. "The basic hourly wage received by a UAW worker in a Big Three plant is close to that received by a Toyota or Honda worker in a U.S. plant. The UAW-negotiated wage was roughly $28 an hour in 2007. For new workers, the hourly wage was lower at $14 an hour; senior workers made more money. The major cost difference between UAW members and employees in foreign-nameplate factories in the U.S. comes in fringe benefits. The UAW has been one of the more successful American unions in fighting for generous pensions and health benefits for its members."

Dan Ikenson of the Cato Institute argued that "total compensation is the cost of labor to the companies, and for GM it is about $73 per hour and for Toyota about $48. The average cost differential between the Big Three and all the foreign nameplate companies is about $30 per hour. That's huge." His computation includes all labor-related costs (e.g., wages, healthcare, and pension—for both current workers and retirees.)

Andrew Sorkin of The New York Times indicated that GM and Chrysler pay $10–20 more per hour than transplants; this was vigorously disputed by David Cole of the Center for Automotive Research.

Average annual wages for production workers at the Big Three were $67,480 in 2007, and $81,940 for skilled workers. In Canada, GM's 2008 average labor costs (including both wages and benefits) were $69 per hour, and Toyota's at $48 per hour, with similar productivity.

According to The Heritage Foundation, the ratio of retirees to workers varies across the Big Three. For each active worker at GM, there were 3.8 retirees or dependents in 2006. At Chrysler, there were 2.0 and at Ford there were 1.6. This means the legacy labor cost burden for GM is significantly greater than its competitors.

Peter Morici, a professor at the University of Maryland, College Park's school of business, testified that the extremely high labor and product development costs will keep the Big Three from developing the high quality vehicles needed to become profitable and surviving.

The Asian-owned companies' U.S. employees are mainly non-unionized; the Big Three are bound by contracts with the UAW.

According to the UAW, labor cost represented 8.4% of the total cost of manufacturing and selling an automobile in 2006. "The vast majority of the costs of producing a vehicle and transporting it to a dealership and preparing it for sale – including design, engineering, marketing, raw materials, executive compensation and other costs – are not related to direct or indirect manufacturing labor."

Jared Bernstein, the chief economist of Vice President Joe Biden, noted in an April 7, 2009 interview that most of the concessions that the UAW made in the 2007 contract applied only to new hires. Older workers "still benefit from contracts that were signed a long time ago."

=== Jobs bank costs ===
The Detroit News published a story in 2005 on how the Big Three U.S. automakers paid more than 12,000 idled employees their full salary and benefits in "jobs bank" programs. The program was established in the 1984 UAW labor contracts with the Big Three to protect workers' salaries and discourage layoffs, as part of the automakers' contracts with the UAW. The union's intent was to protect jobs via a plan to guarantee pay and benefits for union members whose jobs were extinguished by technological progress or plant restructurings. In most cases, workers are paid via the jobs bank only after exhausting government and company unemployment benefits. Some of those workers were placed in retraining.

As a result of the jobs banks, the U.S. automakers are contractually obligated to pay 85–95 percent of union wages and benefits to members of the United Auto Workers union who aren't working – even if their plants have been closed. In the agreement, GM would to allocate $2.1 billion in jobs bank payments over four years, Chrysler $451 million for its program along with another $50 million for salaried union employees, and Ford agreed to set aside $944 million.

=== Number of brands ===
GM had eight brands sold in the United States (not including its overseas brands Vauxhaul, Opel, Holden and at the time GM Daewoo which is now called GM Korea) until it sold three and liquidated one of those brands during bankruptcy, leaving four (Chevrolet, Cadillac, GMC and Buick), while Toyota has only three. More brands require additional marketing and product development expenditures, which drives incremental costs relative to the competition. One analyst estimated that reducing GM brands from 8 to 3 would save $5 billion annually.

However, reducing the number of brands required closing or consolidation of dealerships, which due to state franchise laws is very expensive. For example, GM's retirement of the Oldsmobile brand cost nearly $2 billion.

=== Number and control of dealerships ===
GM and Chrysler have nearly 10,000 dealerships between them, employing an estimated 500,000 people. GM has many more, smaller dealerships spread across its eight brands than Toyota. Dealerships are protected by state laws that make them difficult to close without paying large fees. This makes dealership reform challenging without bankruptcy protection.

=== Bondholders ===
GM was carrying a $43 billion debt burden, with nearly $3 billion per year in interest costs. If bondholders swapped stakes for common stock (equity) which pays no interest, GM's debt and interest burden would be substantially reduced.

However, bondholders of both Chrysler and GM rejected the debt swap offers, complaining of unequal treatment compared to the UAW, citing that their outstanding debt was more than double that of the UAW's health care trust. The UAW had been offered 50% and 40% stakes in the new Chrysler and GM, respectively, while the bondholders would have received 33 cents on the U.S. dollar for Chrysler and 10% of the new GM (an analyst stated that the GM offer would be projected to recover 24 cents on the dollar). With the approval of the Treasury, the offer for bondholders was later amended to include warrants for a further 15% stake.

Bondholders complained of US government interference that bypassed the higher precedence of debtholder claims to favour the UAW, due to the UAW's political contributions to President Barack Obama. One lawyer for the Chrysler bondholders stated that auto task force head Steve Rattner had ignored negotiation requests from the bondholders committee, while Rattner also threatened to destroy one of the bondholder's reputation for holding out. One GM bondholder described this as the socialist state intervention typical of Hugo Chavez's Venezuela, saying "This is the kind of stuff you'd expect from a banana republic. Not from the United States."

Obama publicly accused Chrysler bondholders of being speculators, after they rejected the last offer which caused Chrysler to file for bankruptcy, with some of them receiving death threats after a bankruptcy judge refused to protect their anonymity. The hedge funds stated that their clients included pension funds and university endowments. Around US$7 billion of GM bonds are held by "Mom and Pop-type investors", with one lawyer describing it as autoworker retirees versus retirees.

Not surprisingly, any recapitalization (typically through bankruptcy) would all but wipe out the value of existing common stock shares, which had already declined significantly.

== Economic impact ==
=== Claims that failure would be harmful to economy ===
The auto industry is a key component of the U.S. economy. Economists used 2007–2008 data to build estimates of what a shutdown would cost in summer 2008, in order to set benchmarks to help policy makers understand the impact of bankruptcies. Such estimates were widely discussed among policy makers in late 2008. Closing the Big Three would mean loss of 240,000 very highly paid jobs at the Big Three, a loss of 980,000 highly paid jobs at the suppliers and local dealers, plus the loss of 1.7 million additional jobs throughout the economy—a total loss of 3 million jobs.

Estimates were that a Big Three shutdown would cause a decline in personal income of $151 billion the first year, and $398 billion over three years. The federal, state and local governments would lose tax revenue, and instead spend on welfare programs a total of $156 billion over three years.

Economist David Wyss of S&P has posited that if GM and Chrysler disappear, there could be an increase of about 1 million imported cars every year, which would remove about $25 billion from the U.S. economy. That would reduce GDP by 0.2 percentage points annually—excluding the impact of lost jobs (higher unemployment) and wages.

=== Claims that failure would not be harmful to economy ===
In a November 19, 2008 CNBC article, Jordan Kimmel, a fund manager at Magnet Investing in Randolph, New Jersey, said that if the Big Three automakers were liquidated or completely shut down, foreign companies such as Honda and Toyota would open up new manufacturing plants in the U.S., and there would be no long term loss in employment or damage to the economy.

Michael Schuman of Time magazine stated that although a giant corporation failing would be ugly, it is better than artificially keeping it alive without a prospect of improvement. He compared the possible collapse of the U.S. domestic automakers to the 1999 dismantling of the Daewoo Group in South Korea. Daewoo's proportionate economic impact on Korea was larger than that of the Big Three to the United States. The persistence of the belief that Daewoo and other Korean conglomerates were too big to fail led many bankers and investors to continually waste money on bailouts, despite their poor business plans and unprofitable projects, as Daewoo was unable to repay these loans. Once the too-big-to-fail perception was dispelled, with large conglomerates no longer considered the safest investments, bankers and investors began financing new opportunities in areas which had been starved of capital (small firms, entrepreneurs and consumers), while Korea's GDP actually rose after Daewoo's unwinding. Schuman also noted a similar analogy with Japan during its Lost Decade of the 1990s, where banks kept injecting new funds into unprofitable "zombie firms" to keep them afloat, arguing that they were too big to fail. However, most of these companies were too debt-ridden to do much more than survive on further bailouts, which led to an economist describing Japan as a "loser's paradise". Schuman states that Japan's economy did not begin to recover until this practice had ended.

=== Restructuring process alternatives ===
Industry experts, academics, and media outlets made a variety of recommendations regarding reforming or restructuring the Big Three. Many of these include bankruptcy, a court-supervised method of reorganizing or shutting down a company.

== Bankruptcy and alternatives ==
Bankruptcy discussions centered around the prospect of Chapter 11 bankruptcy, commonly called restructuring, commonly used to provide a window of opportunity for a corporation to renegotiate contracts, sell assets or component businesses for cash, obtain debt forgiveness, or otherwise reform itself as a viable business enterprise. The alternative, Chapter 7 bankruptcy, is used to shut down and liquidate an enterprise and sell off the pieces, with the proceeds going to the debt holders. Under both types of bankruptcy, the shareholders typically lose their investment and debt holders obtain control of the corporation. During November 2008, the debate involved whether a Chapter 11 filing would be beneficial or feasible.

=== Arguments in favor of Chapter 11 bankruptcy ===
In a November 19, 2008, editorial in Forbes, Blythe McGarvie said that bankruptcy would allow the automobile industry to become more competitive and sustainable, and cited the airline industry bankruptcy as an example.

Wharton finance professor Jeremy Siegel, author of the book The Future for Investors, asserted that Chapter 11 bankruptcy would allow Detroit to reorganize but not cause the massive job losses feared by some. "Any bailout of the auto industry is really a bailout for the health benefits of the UAW. That's all it is."

Opponents of a bailout believe that the automakers' problems could be more efficiently resolved by a bankruptcy court with legal power to dissolve existing contracts, shedding costs, and debts that it can no longer afford. They suggested that a government "car czar" would be ineffective since their actions could be swayed by Washington politics.

Former Massachusetts governor Mitt Romney, running in the Republican Party presidential primaries, 2012, confirmed that he had favored bankruptcy rather than government aid to the industry, though he had favored the Troubled Asset Relief Program (TARP) as a whole.

=== Arguments against Chapter 11 bankruptcy ===
Critics of Chapter 11 Bankruptcy as a restructuring process argued that consumers would be unwilling to purchase a car from a bankrupt automaker, as the ability of the automaker to support the warranty is key to the purchase decision. Advocates have argued that the government or private lenders could establish a fund to enable warranty coverage.

GM argued that a bankruptcy would threaten jobs and the solvency of the U.S. federal government's Pension Benefit Guaranty Corporation (PBGC). PBGC Director has said: "GM has not been able to give us a straight answer about the funded status of their pension plan. We can't successfully monitor the situation if they are not responsive." GM's pension fund had enough money for current obligations, but a report issued by the Deutsche Bank estimates that the pension may be $18 billion under-funded by the end of 2008.

=== Feasibility of a prepackaged Chapter 11 bankruptcy ===
A "prepackaged" Chapter 11 bankruptcy means that the key stakeholders have agreed in advance what will happen during the bankruptcy proceedings, which enables greater certainty regarding the outcome and less time spent in bankruptcy protection. Advocates have indicated this would be preferable, while critics argued it was unlikely that all of the stakeholders could agree on terms while outside of bankruptcy.

=== Government facilitated sale of assets ===
The Brookings Institution advocated a government-facilitated solution in which Big Three assets are transferred or sold to other firms better able to deploy the plant and employee resources. "[The] most constructive role the government can play at this point is to provide a short-term infusion of capital with strict repayment rules that will essentially require the auto makers to sell off their assets to other, successful companies." The authors argued that the Big Three make automobiles that not enough Americans want to buy, which cannot be solved by a bankruptcy restructuring focused initially on cost-side considerations like wages and benefits.

=== Government facilitated restructuring ===
Economist and author Jeffrey Sachs has advocated a government and private industry partnership to transform the automotive industry, creating a "high mileage vehicle economy" based on hybrid and fuel cell cars. Loans would be provided immediately, with conditions. He advocates a U.S. strategy of automotive technological leadership, which would "dramatically improve energy and national security, climate security, and U.S. global competitiveness."

=== Arguments against government intervention ===
On November 24, 2008, Congressman Ron Paul (R-TX) wrote, "In bailing out failing companies, they are confiscating money from productive members of the economy and giving it to failing ones. By sustaining companies with obsolete or unsustainable business models, the government prevents their resources from being liquidated and made available to other companies that can put them to better, more productive use. An essential element of a healthy free market, is that both success and failure must be permitted to happen when they are earned. But instead with a bailout, the rewards are reversed – the proceeds from successful entities are given to failing ones. How this is supposed to be good for our economy is beyond me ... It won't work. It can't work ... It is obvious to most Americans that we need to reject corporate cronyism, and allow the natural regulations and incentives of the free market to pick the winners and losers in our economy, not the whims of bureaucrats and politicians."

In a December 17, 2008 opinion column, economist Thomas Sowell said that there was no bailout for the horse and buggy industry 100 years ago when it was replaced by the automobile, and that the overall standard of living is higher when winners and losers are determined by customers instead of by politicians. He also blamed the decline of the Big Three on the economic policies of the "rust belt" states, and said that Japanese car companies preferred to build factories in other U.S. states that were not so hostile to businesses.

In a June 16, 2009 report Ernst & Young stated: "Policies that protect firms or industries can result in reduced incentives for entrepreneurs to invest in innovative ideas and for large firms to invest in R&D because they no longer face the competitive pressure to constantly improve their product in order to improve (or maintain) their market share."

=== Changes to management and board ===
Critics argued for the removal of General Motors' senior management. Such removal is typical in a bailout.

=== Mergers ===
One or more of the Big Three could have merged, enabling cost savings and focusing on the most profitable brands. However, the UAW and CAW opposed this move, as it would certainly involve layoffs. GM and Chrysler held talks which ultimately went to nothing, with Chrysler, as of June 10, 2009, a fully owned subsidiary of Italian automaker Fiat.

=== Comparison with British Leyland ===
The comparison was made with the situation of British Leyland (itself an amalgamation of many car makers similar to General Motors) in the 1970s, which at the time had a 36% market share in the UK. During that period, the UK government nationalised and invested several billion pounds into the ailing business; faced with competition from Mainland Europe and questionable build quality, the business struggled to compete. While the business slimmed its product line, concentrated mainly on the profitable Austin and Rover brands and by the 1980s had some successful models such as the Austin Metro, the brand ended up being broken up and is now owned by Nanjing Automobile and has largely been dismantled.

== Federal government bailout process and timeline ==
On November 19, 2008, there was a United States Senate hearing on the automotive crisis in the presence of the heads of Chrysler, Ford and General Motors. The auto manufacturers explained that they would need financial aid of $25 billion if they were to avoid bankruptcy. The Senate was divided on the issue. The Republican senators were unwilling to provide aid, some even suggesting that bankruptcy might be the best option as it would free manufacturers from the employment deals agreed with the unions. The Democrats, however, continued to insist that action needed to be taken quickly, in line with President-elect Obama's stance on the matter. Rick Wagoner, head of General Motors, estimated that there could be a loss of 3 million jobs within the first year if the auto industry failed. "This is all about a lot more than just Detroit. It's about saving the U.S. economy from a catastrophic collapse", he said.

At the November 19, 2008, hearing, Gary Ackerman (D-NY) said, "Maybe you can tell us what you're actually going to do to sell cars people want", and Michael Capuano (D-MA) said, "My fear is you're going to take this money and continue the same stupid decisions you've made for 25 years."

On November 20, General Motors shares fell to the lowest price since the Great Depression as the chances of a bail-out diminished. Ford shares also fell drastically. Once rumors of bipartisan progress on some kind of a bailout began to circle, share prices of these companies recovered.

A November 20, 2008 Detroit Free Press article said that the UAW was considering ending its jobs bank program as a condition for a federal bailout.

Democratic congressional party leaders Nancy Pelosi and Harry Reid sent a letter to the CEO's of the Big Three automakers calling on these leaders to present by December 2, 2008, a "credible restructuring plan" involving "significant sacrifices and major changes to [the] way of doing business", to qualify for further government assistance. The letter included a variety of principles and requirements, including a situation assessment, forecasts under various assumptions, taxpayer protection, transparent reporting to an oversight body, dividend and executive pay restrictions, and approach to covering healthcare and pension obligations.

On December 2, 2008, the Big Three submitted revised plans to Congress which apparently included more drastic measures such as the lowering of executive pay, reducing the number of brands and refinancing company debt. It emerged that the total amount of the bailout requested had now risen to $34 billion. Painting an even more dramatic picture of what would happen if Congress did not respond quickly, Chrysler said it would need $7 billion by the end of the month just to keep running while GM asked for $4 billion immediately.

In an interview that was broadcast on NBC's Meet The Press on December 7, 2008, President-elect Barack Obama said, "The last thing I want to see happen is for the auto industry to disappear, but I'm also concerned that we don't put $10 billion or $20 billion or $30 billion or whatever billion dollars into an industry, and then, six months to a year later, they come back hat in hand and say, `Give me more.'"

=== Congressional bailout bill ===
On December 9, 2008, negotiators revealed the terms of an emerging deal between the White House and Congress under which a short-term $15 billion bailout for the Big Three would be overseen by a federal "car czar" or trustee.

On December 10, 2008, the House Financial Services Committee released a copy of the proposed financial bailout package for GM, Ford, and Chrysler. The bill proposed the appointment of a 'car czar' to oversee automakers' restructuring efforts, and restrictions on executive bonuses, golden parachute packages and required automakers to sell or divest themselves of any privately owned or leased aircraft.

=== Senate rejects bailout ===
On December 11, the bill failed to pass, losing 52–35 on a Senate procedural vote. A statement from GM expressed its deep disappointment with the failure and said, "We will assess all of our options to continue our restructuring and to obtain the means to weather the current economic crisis." Chrysler said that it "is obviously disappointed in what transpired in the Senate and will continue to pursue a workable solution to help ensure the future viability of the company."

=== Bush approves bailout ===
On December 19, George W. Bush announced that he had approved the bailout plan, which would give loans of $17.4 billion to U.S. automakers GM and Chrysler, stating that under present economic conditions, "allowing the U.S. auto industry to collapse is not a responsible course of action." Bush provided $13.4 billion immediately, with another $4 billion available in February 2009. Funds would be made available from the Emergency Economic Stabilization Act of 2008. General Motors would get $9.4 billion, and Chrysler $4 billion.

However, it had been argued that the Treasury lacked the statutory authority to direct TARP funds to the automakers, since TARP is limited to "financial institutions" under Section 102 of the TARP. It was also argued that providing TARP funds to automaker's financing operations, such as GMAC, runs counter to the intent of Congress for limiting TARP funds to true "financial institutions". On December 19, 2008, President Bush used his executive authority to declare that TARP funds may be spent on any program he personally deems necessary to avert the financial crisis, and declared Section 102 to be nonbinding.

The federal loan would prevent General Motors from going into immediate bankruptcy. The bailout required both companies to dramatically restructure their operations to demonstrate long-term viability. In February 2009, the Obama administration would determine the automakers' progress in meeting the conditions of the loans, and then decide whether to supply more government aid or to force automakers to repay the loans and face bankruptcy. The loans would carry an interest rate of 5 percent but may rise to 10 percent if the auto manufacturers default on them.

=== Presidential task force on the auto industry ===
Under the Obama administration, the idea of a car czar was considered and ultimately abandoned in favor of joint Lawrence Summers/Timothy Geithner oversight of a possible second round of lending to the auto companies. In mid-February, the auto companies GM and Chrysler applied for additional funds.

The task force was formed in February 2009 instead, and began meetings at that time.

=== Second bailout ===
On February 18, 2009, General Motors and Chrysler again approached the U.S. government, in regard to obtaining a second bridging loan of $21.6 billion (£15.2 billion). $16.6 billion of this would go to General Motors, while Chrysler would take $5 billion. General Motors agreed to shed 47,000 jobs, close five plants, and axe 12 car models. Chrysler agreed to cut 3,000 jobs, cut one shift from production, and axe three car models. General Motors was also looking to sell its Swedish subsidiary, Saab. GM made no mention of plans for its German subsidiary, Opel, or its British subsidiary, Vauxhall.

=== Obama address to joint session of Congress ===
In his joint address to Congress in 2009, Obama stated:

We will invest fifteen billion dollars in technologies like ... more efficient cars and trucks built right here in America. As for auto industry, everyone recognizes that years of bad decision-making and global recession have pushed our automakers to the brink. We should not, and will not, protect them from their own bad practices. But we are committed to the goal of a re-tooled, re-imagined auto industry that can compete and win. Millions of jobs depend on it. Scores of communities depend on it. And I believe the nation that invented the automobile cannot walk from it

=== Chrysler bankruptcy ===
On April 30, 2009, Chrysler filed for Chapter 11 bankruptcy after talks with lenders broke down. On the May 14, 2009 Chrysler announced it was to close 25% of its US dealerships as part of its restructuring process.

=== General Motors bankruptcy ===
Only days after approaching the U.S. Government to seek further funding, General Motors published its losses for the final quarter of 2008 to be at $9.6 billion (£6.7 billion). This brought its overall 2008 losses to $30.9 billion. In 2007, General Motors made a loss of $38.7 billion. In the light of the published losses GM has conceded that it expected auditors to question its future viability when it releases its annual report in March.

On the June 1, 2009, General Motors filed for Chapter 11 bankruptcy after failing to successfully negotiate deals with bond holders. On the day the application was made, General Motors was largely a nationalized institution (the U.S. government owning 60% and the Canadian 12.5%), the remaining private stakes mainly being owned by employees. The Chapter 11 bankruptcy in New York marked the largest failure of an industrial company in US history. The restructuring would drastically change General Motors, with at least 20,000 US employees likely to lose their jobs. General Motors had previously announced that another nine plants will be closed while three more will be idled. GM's chief executive Fritz Henderson appealed to customers to give the company another chance, claiming "the GM that let too many of you down is now history".

A May 18, 2009 article in The Washington Post said that seven weeks after the Obama administration fired GM CEO G. Richard Wagoner Jr., Wagoner had still not received the $20 million severance package that the company had contractually promised him.

During a June 9, 2009 interview, Edward E. Whitacre Jr., the new chairman of GM, said, "I don't know anything about cars ... A business is a business, and I think I can learn about cars. I'm not that old, and I think the business principles are the same." A year later, he resigned.

=== Amount of investment ===
A February 18, 2009 CNN article said the bailout could cost U.S. taxpayers $130 billion, but this number does not consider that monies recovered later.

As of early June 2009, the Bush and Obama administrations had invested $80.3 billion.

On May 24, 2011, Chrysler repaid the last of the money to the U.S. and Canadian treasuries, several years ahead of schedule.

== Image issues ==
Issues involving the public image of the companies involved in this crisis also played key parts during the process.

=== GM advertisement: an apology and a recommitment ===
On December 8, 2008, General Motors unveiled a new advertisement where the company apologized for disappointing and violating the trust of American consumers. They pledged to make a commitment to regain focus on core brands and away from pickups and SUVs, declaring they needed to make such an unfiltered statement "since quite a bit of media commentary has not kept pace with our actual progress to transform the company."

=== November 19, 2008 congressional hearing ===
According to ABC News and other media outlets, the Big Three CEOs (Rick Wagoner of GM, Alan Mulally of Ford and Robert Nardelli of Chrysler) who attended the November 19, 2008, meeting in Washington D.C. to request a bailout traveled to the meeting in private luxury jet aircraft. A November 19 CNN article noted that "Gary Ackerman, D-NY ... and several other representatives suggested that it was difficult to give money to the automakers when the CEOs had all flown to Washington on corporate jets. 'Those types of symbolic things matter and set a tone,' said Peter Roskam, R-Ill." House Speaker Nancy Pelosi summed up the congressional response to their requests with the statement "Until they show us the plan, we cannot show them the money", and demanded that the automakers return to submit convincing turnaround plans by December 2.

A November 19, 2008, CNN article quoted Thomas Schatz, president of Citizens Against Government Waste, as saying, "They're coming to Washington to beg the taxpayers to help them. It's unseemly to be running around on a $20,000 flight versus a $500 round trip." The article noted that although it was not known how much the private flights cost, $20,000 was said to be a reasonable estimation.

On December 2, 2008, it was reported that General Motors and Ford were planning to sell their fleets of corporate luxury jets.

=== Hybrid electric vehicle usage ===
Wagoner, Mulally and Nardelli each drove separately to Washington for a December 2 congressional hearing in hybrid electric vehicles after the above-noted criticism for arriving to Washington for the November hearing in private jets. Wagoner rode in a Chevrolet Malibu hybrid accompanied by Beth Lowery, the company's top environmental and safety official. Mulally travelled in a Ford Escape Hybrid. Nardelli arrived in a Chrysler Aspen Hybrid.

=== Non-ecological past practices ===
From the energy-conservation point of view the Big Three have a negative image. Ecology-minded Americans had little sympathy, given the big automakers' reputation for maximizing profits at the environment's expense, and their role in the dismantling of mass-transport systems and privately owned railways between the 1920s and 1960s. Some have alleged that The Big Three contributed to the development of suburbs, seen as fuel-inefficient in that it requires commuters to drive to cities from increasingly more distant suburbs. Facing a saturated car market in the U.S. in the early 1920s, GM engaged in a controversial policy along with road-builders that triggered the massive shift from the mass transportation of the previous century to the "one-person-one-car" trip of today.

=== Bond ratings downgraded ===
On December 19, 2008, Fitch Ratings downgraded the Issuer Default Rating of General Motors and Chrysler to "C", indicating "default is imminent".

A December 22, 2008, article from Bloomberg reported that General Motors and Ford "had their debt cut further below investment status by Standard & Poor's and Moody's Investors Service. GM's unsecured debt was trimmed one level to C, or 11 grades below investment quality, by S&P. Moody's lowered its rating on $26 billion in Ford debt by two grades to Caa3, or nine below investment quality."

=== Lobbying and other financial ties between Big Three and Congress ===
The Big Three spent almost $50 million to lobby Congress during the first nine months of 2008. Senator Carl Levin (D-Michigan) received $438,304 over 30 years, or $14,610 a year. House member John Dingell (D-Michigan) received nearly $1 million over his 54 years in Congress, or $18,518 a year. House member Joe Knollenberg (R-Michigan) received $879,327 over only 16 years in office, or $54,957 a year. Dingell's wife Debbie used to work as a lobbyist for General Motors, and after she married Dingell, she became a senior GM executive at an undisclosed salary. As of May 2008, Dingell owned GM stock worth up to $350,000, GM stock options worth up to $1 million more, and a GM pension fund. In 2000, the Dingells owned GM stock options worth up to $5 million. In 1998, Dingell sold GM stock options worth up to $1 million. The value of that stock, options and pension has been lost in the bankruptcy restructuring that Congress approved for GM.

GM sent letters to tens of thousands of their dealers, supplier executives, employees and union members, asking recipients to call and write Congress with several "talking points" about the potential effects of a GM bankruptcy.

== Corporate turnaround proposals and strategies ==
=== Products: electric and hybrid vehicles ===
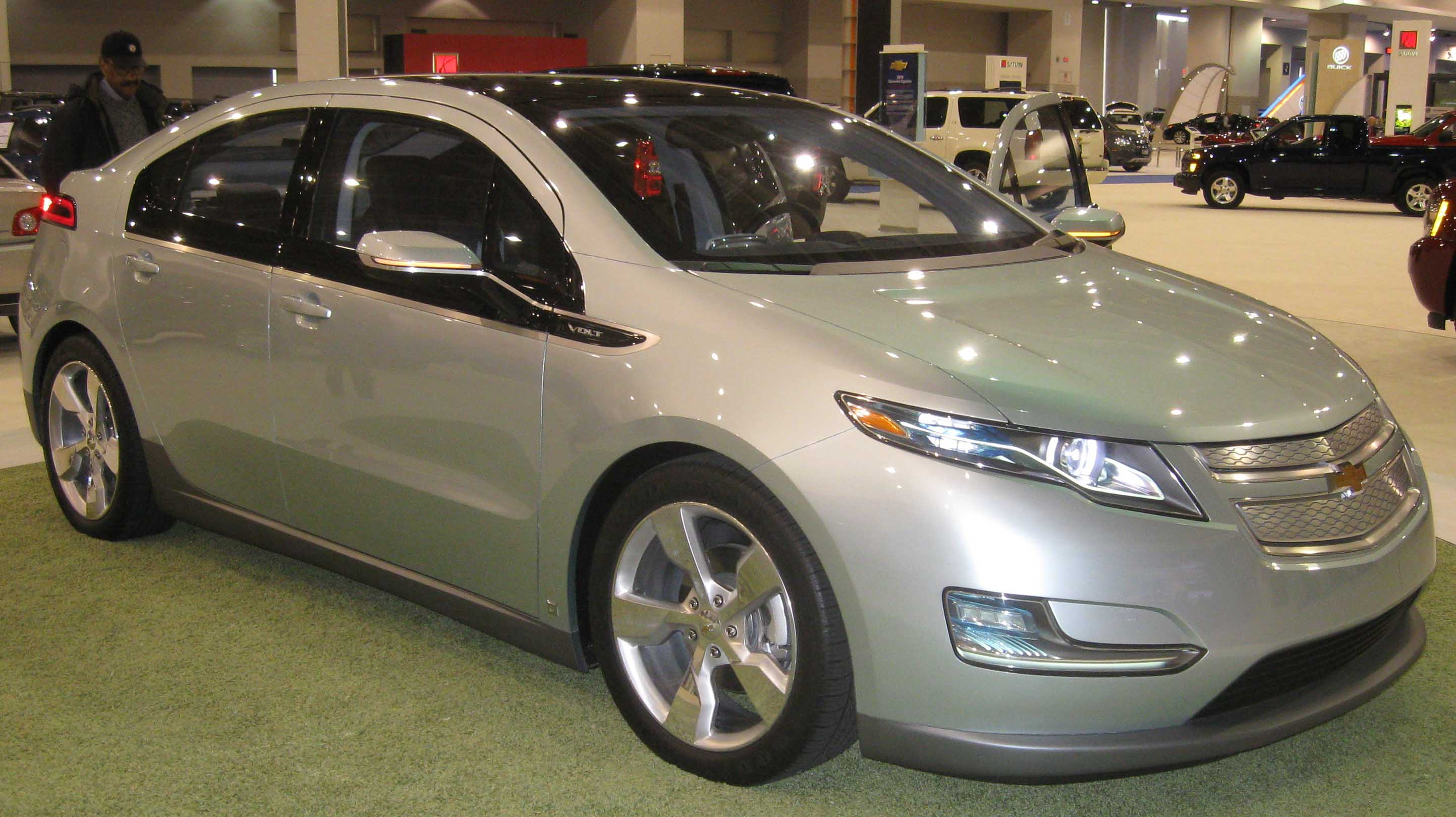
The Chevrolet Volt

Detroit's "Big Three" automakers went to Washington, D.C., on December 2 (arriving in Washington in hybrids after being criticized for traveling to the earlier November Senate hearing in private jets) to present their long-term viability plans to the United States Congress, and those plans included significant commitments to fuel-saving and electric vehicle technologies.

Ford Motor Company unveiled an aggressive plan to electrify its fleet of vehicles, including plans to offer an all-electric van-type vehicle in 2010 for use in commercial fleets, complemented by a battery-powered sedan in 2011. By 2012, the company will bring a family of regular hybrids, plug-in hybrids, and battery electric vehicles to market. Ford intends to invest about $14 billion on fuel-efficient technologies over the next seven years and aims to achieve a 36% improvement in fuel economy for its entire fleet by the 2015 model year. The company has applied to DOE's Advanced Technology Vehicles Manufacturing Loan Program for $5 billion to support these efforts, but the company also sought up to $9 billion in bridge loans. However, Ford expected to remain viable through 2009 and hopes to avoid drawing on the loan.

GM unveiled the production version of the Chevy Volt in September. The vehicle will be able to travel up to 40 miles in all-electric mode. General Motors Corporation (GM) is involved in a well-publicized effort to launch its plug-in hybrid model, the Chevy Volt, in 2010, and the company also intends to employ the Volt drivetrain in other vehicles. GM plans to launch predominately fuel-efficient cars and crossovers over the next four years, investing $2.9 billion in fuel-efficient technologies and alternative fuels during that time period. By 2012, GM will offer 15 hybrid models, and more than half of its fleet will be flex-fuel vehicles, able to run on either gasoline or ethanol-rich E85. GM is seeking $12 billion in bridge loans through 2009 and is also asking for revolving credit of $6 billion that it could draw on if its sales forecast falls short. The company ended the third quarter of the year with cash reserves of $16 billion, but it estimates that it should have at least $11 billion on hand to maintain its operations. Without a federal loan, GM expects its cash reserves to fall to $10.1 billion by year's end and to fall to $3.6 billion by February.

Chrysler LLC predicted that for the 2009 model year, 73% of its vehicles will be more fuel efficient than their 2008 models, and the company planned to launch more small, fuel-efficient vehicles in the future. The company's plan also called for the introduction of a Dodge Ram hybrid in 2010, along with the company's first electric-drive vehicle. Chrysler also planned to offer three additional electric-drive vehicles by 2013. And like GM, Chrysler planned to make half of its fleet flex-fuel capable by 2012. The company sought a bridge loan of $7 billion. Chrysler ended the first half of the year with $9.4 billion in cash, but expected to end the year with only $2.5 billion in cash, and was concerned that it might not make it through the first quarter of 2009 without the loan.

Automakers have already submitted applications for more than $20 billion in retooling loans to pay for fuel efficient vehicle projects.

=== Production capacity: factory closings ===
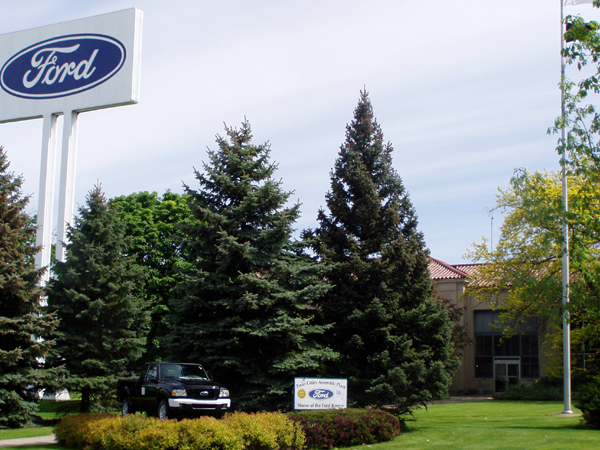
Ford's Twin Cities Assembly Plant in Minnesota was closed in 2011.

On December 12, 2008, General Motors announced that it was temporarily closing 20 factories in North America. On December 17, Chrysler announced it would idle all 30 of its plants for at least one month.

=== GM will invest $1 billion of bailout money in Brazil ===
A February 2, 2009 article in the Latin American Herald Tribune said that General Motors would invest $1 billion in Brazil, and that this money is part of the bailout that it received from the U.S. government.

=== Brand consolidation ===
General Motors' plan was to consolidate their portfolio of US brands, concentrating on the Cadillac, Chevrolet, Buick and GMC brands, while phasing out, or possibly selling their Pontiac, Hummer and Saturn brands.

On June 2, GM Motors announced the sale of the Hummer brand of off-road vehicles to Sichuan Tengzhong Heavy Industrial Machinery Company Ltd, a deal that fell through after failing to obtain Chinese regulatory approvals. The last Hummer H3 rolled off the line at Shreveport on May 24, 2010.

== See also ==
- Chrysler Chapter 11 reorganization
- Effects of the 2008–2010 automotive industry crisis on Canada
- General Motors Chapter 11 reorganization
