= List of Wesleyan University people in politics and government =

This is a partial list of notable people affiliated with Wesleyan University.

== Politics and government ==
=== Non-U.S. government political figures ===
- Wilbur Fisk Burns (1860) – Wesleyan's first black graduate; Comptroller, Liberia, Africa; died before the age of 30
- K C Chan (1979) – Hong Kong Secretary for the Treasury (2007–); member, Executive Council of Hong Kong (2007–)
- Delyan Dobrev (B.A. 2002) – Bulgarian Minister of Economy and Energy (since 2012); Deputy Minister (2011–12); member, National Assembly of Bulgaria, GERB party; Member of Parliament, from Haskovo
- Paul Douglass (B.A.) – personal adviser, President Syngman Rhee (1st President of South Korea, 1948–1960), 1952–1956
- Jean François-Poncet (1947) – French Minister of Foreign Affairs ( 1978–81); Secretary General, Office of the President of France (1976–78); Secretary of State (1974–76); member, French Senate (1983–2010)
- G. E. King (B.A. 1859) – 2nd and 4th Premier of New Brunswick, Canadian Confederation (1870–71, 72–78); twice Cabinet Minister and member, Executive Council (1869–71)
- John Lipsky (1968) – acting Managing Director, International Monetary Fund (IMF) (2011); First Deputy Managing Director (second-in-command), IMF (2006–11)
- David Lipton (1975) – First Deputy Managing Director (second-in-command), International Monetary Fund (2011–)
- Nobutaka Machimura – Chief Cabinet Secretary of Japan (2007–08); twice Japanese Minister for Foreign Affairs; thrice Minister of Education and Science of Japan
- John Mott-Smith – twice Minister of Finance (1869–72; 1891); Minister of Interior (1876–78); Minister to the U.S. (1891–93); member, Privy Council, Kingdom of Hawaii; member, both houses, Legislature of the Hawaiian Kingdom
- Horst Siebert – member, German Council of Economic Experts (1990–2003); official economic adviser to two EU Presidents (2002–04, 2005–07)
- Kenko Sone (1990) – Director, OECD Division, Economic Affairs Bureau, Japanese Ministry of Foreign Affairs (2008–)

=== U.S. Cabinet and executive branch senior advisors ===
- Ian Bassin (1998) – Associate White House Counsel to the President of the United States (2009–11)
- Ron Bloom (1977) – cited in Time's "100 Most Influential People in the World" of 2010; member, Presidential Task Force on the Auto Industry (2009–11); U.S. Car Czar (2009–11); U.S. Manufacturing Czar (2009–11)
- Lael Brainard (B.A.) – Member of the Federal Reserve Board of Governors (2014–present) Deputy Director, Under Secretary of the Treasury for International Affairs (2010–2013) and United States National Economic Council and Deputy Assistant to the President on International Economics (1998–2000)
- Thomas H. Collins (M.A.) – 22nd Commandant, United States Coast Guard, guided Coast Guard after 9/11 (2002–06); 22nd Vice Commandant of the Coast Guard
- Diana Farrell (1987) – member, Presidential Task Force on the Auto Industry (2009–11); Deputy Director, United States National Economic Council (2009–11)
- William C. Gilbreath – North Dakota Commissioner of Agriculture and Labor (1905–14)
- Eliot Glassheim – member, North Dakota House of Representatives (1993–2017, 1975)
- Mary Ann Handley – member, Connecticut State Senate (1997–10), Chief Deputy Majority Leader
- Robert E. Hunter (1962) – twice United States National Security Council Director (1977–79, 1979–81); White House staff, administration, Lyndon B. Johnson
- Daphne Kwok (1984) – Chair, U.S. President's Advisory Commission on Asian Americans and Pacific Islanders (2010–); U.S. Secretary of Energy's Advisory Board (2000–05); founding chair, National Council of Asian Pacific Americans
- David Lipton (1975) – United States National Economic Council (2009–11); United States National Security Council (2009–11); former Under Secretary of the Treasury for International Affairs
- James Loy (M.A.) – acting United States Secretary of Homeland Security (2005); 2nd Head, United States Transportation Security Administration (2002–03); 2nd Deputy Secretary of Homeland Security (second-in-command) (2003–05); 21st Commandant, United States Coast Guard, guided Coast Guard after 9/11 (1998–02)
- John A. Randall 1881 – United States Under Secretary of War (1918) (former 3rd ranking official in the U.S. Department of War)
- Stephen S. Trott (B.A.) – United States Associate Attorney General (3rd ranking official in the U.S. Department of Justice) (1986–88); Assistant Attorney General of the U.S.
- Henry Merritt Wriston (B.A. 1911, M.A.) – personal adviser, President Dwight D. Eisenhower
- Walter B. Wriston (1941) – Chairman, Ronald Reagan's Economic Policy Advisory Board (1980–89); twice offered U.S. Secretary of the Treasury (by Presidents Richard Nixon and Gerald Ford), twice declined; Presidential Medal of Freedom

=== Subcabinet ===
- Andrea Barthwell (B.A.) – former Deputy United States Drug Czar (former cabinet-level) under President George W. Bush
- Leonard Burman (1975) – tax-policy expert; Deputy Assistant Secretary of the Treasury for Tax Analysis (1998–00), served as administration's top tax economist
- Justin R. Clark (1997) – Director of the White House Office of Public Liaison (2018), Director of the White House Office of Intergovernmental Affairs (2017–2018)
- Susannah Fox (B.A.) – Chief Technology Officer of the United States Department of Health and Human Services (2015–2017)
- Charles James (1976) – former Assistant Attorney General of the United States in charge of the Antitrust Division
- James Lynch (B.A.) – Director, Bureau of Justice Statistics, United States Department of Justice (2010–12/31/2012)
- Charles Alan Wright (B.A.) – represented President Richard Nixon as lead lawyer on issues growing out of Watergate investigations, though he did not argue case in Supreme Court

=== Agency heads, commissioners, and others ===
- Robert M. Ball (B.A. 1935, M.A. 1936) – Head, United States Social Security Administration (1962–1973); served under three presidents
- Douglas J. Bennet (1959) – Head, United States Agency for International Development (USAID) (1979–81); served twice as United States Assistant Secretary of State
- Scott Gottlieb (1994) – Commissioner of Food and Drugs (2017–2019), Food and Drug Administration, United States Department of Health and Human Services
- Martin A. Knapp (1868) – Chairman (1898–1910), Commissioner (1897–1910), United States Interstate Commerce Commission
- John Macy (1938) – Head, United States Federal Emergency Management Agency (FEMA) (1979–81); twice President and Commissioner, United States Civil Service Commission (1953–58; 1961–69)
- Robert E. Patricelli (1961) – Head, Federal Transit Administration (FTA) (1975–77); Deputy Undersecretary, Department of Health, Education and Welfare
- Jessica Rosenworcel (B.A.) – Chairwoman (2021–2025) and Commissioner (2012–2025), United States Federal Communications Commission (FCC)

=== Senators ===
- Michael F. Bennet (1987) – Democratic Senator, Colorado (appointed, 2009–10; elected, 2011–); former superintendent, Denver Public Schools
- Cornelius Cole (1847) – Republican Senator and Congressman, California; at 102 the oldest Senator in American History
- Norris Cotton (1923) – Republican Senator and Congressman, New Hampshire
- Alonzo J. Edgerton (1850) – Republican Senator, Minnesota; Brigadier General, American Civil War
- John Hickenlooper (B.A. 1974, M.A. 1980) – Democratic Senator, Colorado (2021-); 42nd Governor of Colorado (2011–2019); Mayor, Denver, Colorado (2003–11)
- Lester C. Hunt – former Democratic Senator, Wyoming
- Watson Squire (1859) – Republican Senator, Washington
- Josiah O. Wolcott (1901) – former Democratic Senator, Delaware

=== Representatives ===
- John E. Andrus (1862) – Republican Congressman, Westchester, New York
- John Baker (1879) – Republican Congressman, Indiana (1875–1881)
- Raymond Baldwin (1916) – Republican Senator, Connecticut
- Edward G. Biester, Jr. (1952) – former Republican Congressman, Bucks County, Pennsylvania
- Benjamin T. Biggs – former Democratic Congressman, Delaware
- John R. Buck – former Republican Congressman, Connecticut
- William Citron (1918) – Republican Congressman, Connecticut
- Clarence D. Coughlin – Republican Congressman, Pennsylvania
- Emilio Daddario (1939) – former Democratic Congressman, Connecticut; Legion of Merit
- Frederick M. Davenport (1889) – Republican Congressman, New York; Progressive Party candidate, Governor, 1914
- Stanley W. Davenport (1884) – Democratic Congressman, Pennsylvania
- Charles Douglas III – former Republican Congressman, New Hampshire
- Miles Granger (1842) – Democratic Congressman, Connecticut
- Clarence E. Hancock (1906) – Republican Congressman, Syracuse, New York
- Chester Hubbard (1840) – Republican Congressman, West Virginia; [[[Unionist politician (American Civil War)|Unionist]], 39th Congress; Republican, 40th Congress
- William Pallister Hubbard (1863) – Republican Congressman, West Virginia
- Mitchell Jenkins (1919) – Republican Congressman, Pennsylvania
- Rufus H. King – former Congressman, New York; President Lincoln requested Pope Pius IX accept King as 1st U.S. representative to Vatican
- Nobutaka Machimura – member, House of Representatives of Japan (since 1983–); member and acting Secretary General, Liberal Democratic Party, Japan
- Edwin H. May, Jr. (1948) – former Republican Congressman, Connecticut
- James Pike (1837–1839, theology) – Congressman, New Hampshire; American Party, 34th Congress; Republican Party, 35th Congress
- Max Rose (2003–2007, history) – Congressman, New York; Democratic Party, 116th Congress, and US Army Bronze Star recipient
- George Washington Shonk (1873) – Republican Congressman, Pennsylvania
- Abner Sibal (1943) – former Republican Congressman, Connecticut
- David Skaggs (1964) – former Democratic Congressman, Colorado; Chair, Office of Congressional Ethics (2009–); 1st chair, OCE (2008–09)
- Julius Strong – former Republican Congressman, Connecticut
- William Copeland Wallace (1876) – Republican Congressman, New York

=== Governors ===
- Raymond Baldwin (1916) – 72nd and 74th Governor of Connecticut (1939–41, 1943–46)
- Gerald Baliles (1963) – 65th Democratic Governor of Virginia (1986–90)
- Benjamin T. Biggs – 46th Governor of Delaware (1887–91)
- Walter Eli Clark (1895) – Republican, 7th Governor, District of Alaska (1909–12), and 1st Governor of Alaska Territory (1912–13)
- Oran Faville – 1st Lieutenant Governor of Iowa (1858–60); former president, Ohio Wesleyan Female College
- John Hickenlooper (B.A. 1974, M.A. 1980) – 42nd Governor of Colorado (2011–2019); Mayor, Denver, Colorado (2003–11)
- Arthur MacArthur, Sr. (attended) – 4th Governor of Wisconsin (1956), Lieutenant Governor of Wisconsin (1956–58)
- Frederick Walker Pitkin – 2nd Governor of Colorado (served two terms, 1879–83)
- Peter Shumlin (1979) – 81st Governor of Vermont (two terms, 2011–12, 2012–2017); President Pro Tempore, Vermont Senate (1994–02, 2006–11); co-founder, Landmark College
- Carlton Skinner – 1st Civilian Governor of Guam (1949–53); wrote Constitution, Guam; founded, University of Guam; prominent advocate, integration of U.S. Armed Forces
- Watson Squire (1859) – 12th Governor, Territory of Washington (1884–87)

=== Diplomats and other government figures ===
- Raymond Bateman (1950) – President of the New Jersey Senate (1970–72); chairman, New Jersey Sports and Exposition Authority (resigned in 2001)
- L. Dean Brown (1942) – United States Ambassador to Jordan, Gambia, Senegal; Special Envoy to Lebanon
- Kathleen Clyde (2001) – member, Ohio House of Representatives (since 2011)
- Walter L. Cutler (1953) – United States Ambassador to Saudi Arabia (1984–89), Congo-Kinshasa (1975–79), Tunisia (1982–84)
- Joseph Denison (1840) – co-founder, abolitionist town of Manhattan, Kansas (1855) (see Bleeding Kansas)
- William R. Fairchild (1883) – President pro tempore of the Vermont State Senate (1917–19); state representative (1880–90, 1915–17), state senator (1890–92)
- Art Feltman (B.A. 1980) – member, Connecticut House of Representatives (1997–09)
- Don Friedman – member, Colorado House of Representatives 1962–1976; businessman; talk-show host
- Henry G. Hager (1956) – Pennsylvania State Senator (1973–1984), President pro tempore of the Pennsylvania Senate (1981–1984)
- Robert E. Hunter (1962) – United States Permanent Representative to NATO (with rank of Ambassador) (1993–98); President, Atlantic Treaty Association (2003–2008)
- David T. Killion – United States Permanent Representative to NATO (with rank of Ambassador) (2009–)
- Matt Lesser (2010) – member, Connecticut House of Representatives (since 2009)
- Fred C. Norton (1950) – 47th (1980–81) and 50th (1987) Speaker of the Minnesota House of Representatives
- Charles Phelps (1875) – first Connecticut Attorney General (1899–1903) and Secretary of the State of Connecticut (1897–99)
- Robert Carter Pitman (1845) – President of the Massachusetts Senate (1868–69); state representative (1858), state senator (1864–65, 1868–69)
- William Thornton Pryce (1953) – United States Ambassador to Honduras (1993–1996)
- Stephen H. Rhinesmith (1965) – Special United States Ambassador to the Soviet Union under President Reagan
- Laura Ruderman (1992) – former representative, Washington House of Representatives, Washington State Legislature (1999–2005)
- Julius Augustus Skilton MD (A.M. 1853) – U.S. Consul General, Chief of Mission, Republic of Mexico (1872–78); U.S. Consul, Mexico City (1869–72)
- Benjamin Franklin Tefft (1835) – acting U.S. Minister to Sweden, American Civil War; U.S. Consul in Stockholm; president, predecessor of Syracuse University (Genesee College)
- Francis T. Underhill, Jr. (1942) – former United States Ambassador to Poland, Malaysia, the Philippines, and South Korea
- Jacob Walles (1979) – U.S. Ambassador to Tunisia (2012–2015); U.S. Consul General, Chief of Mission, Jerusalem (2005–2009)
- Steven Walsh (1995) – member, Massachusetts House of Representatives (since 2005); practicing attorney and adjunct faculty member
- Henry Gordon Wells (1902) – President of the Massachusetts Senate in 1916 succeeding Calvin Coolidge (1916–17)
- John Quinby Wood (1890) – U.S. Consul General, Chief of Mission, Addis Ababa (1913–14); U.S. Consul, Chemnitz (1914–17); Marseille (1917)
- Henry Merritt Wriston (B.A. 1911, M.A.) – member, United States Department of State's Advisory Committee on United States Foreign Service (under President Eisenhower)
- David Wu (1991) – policy advisor, Indiana Governor Mitch Daniels; Indiana Lt Governor Rebecca Skillman; Indianapolis Mayor Gregory Ballard; Rudy Giuliani for President; Campo for Congress; Susan Brooks for Congress; Bruce Rauner for Governor of Illinois
- Stephen M. Young (1973) – U.S. Ambassador, Consulate General of the United States in Hong Kong (2010–); former United States Ambassador to Kyrgyzstan

=== Mayors and County Executives ===
- John Emory Andrus (1857) – Mayor of Yonkers, New York
- Emilio Q. Daddario (1939) – Mayor of Middletown, Connecticut; Legion of Merit
- Stanley W. Davenport (1884) – Mayor of Middletown, Connecticut
- Sid Espinosa (1994) – 1st Latino Mayor (2011–), Vice Mayor (2010–11), City Council member (2008–), Palo Alto, California
- William Henry Eustis (1873) – Mayor of Minneapolis, Minnesota; philanthropist; founder of Eustis Hospital
- Robert J. Harris – Mayor of Ann Arbor, Michigan; Rhodes Scholar; professor, University of Michigan Law School (1959–74)
- Yoriko Kishimoto (1977) – 1st Asian-American Mayor (2007–09), Vice Mayor (2006–07), City Council member (2002–06), Palo Alto, California
- Alex Knopp (1969) – eight-term member of the Connecticut House of Representatives (1987 – 2001) and two term mayor of Norwalk, Connecticut (2001–2005); clinical Lecturer at Yale Law School (since 2006)
- Stephen May (1953) – Mayor of Rochester, New York; historian and writer
- Benjamin Franklin Mudge (1840) – Mayor of Lynn, Massachusetts

=== Other officials ===
- Joel H. Cooper – state legislator, abolitionist (his house was a stop on the Underground Railroad) and postmaster
- Mike Demicco – Member of the Connecticut House of Representatives
- William H. Hall – president pro tempore of the Connecticut State Senate (1921–1922)
- Elizabeth Maher Muoio – Treasurer of New Jersey (2018–present) and Member of the New Jersey General Assembly (2015–2018)
- Francis Hubert Parker (1874) – United States Attorney for the District of Connecticut
- John Rhea (1987) – Chairman, New York City Housing Authority (2009–2013)
- Edward Suslovic – current member, Portland, Maine City Council; previously represented part of Portland in Maine House of Representatives (2002 to 2004); served as ceremonial mayor of Portland (2007 to 2008)
- Rick Tuttle (1962) – Freedom Rider and Los Angeles City Controller
- Hiram Willey (1839) – United States Attorney for the district of Connecticut, was a member of the Connecticut Legislature and State Senate, Mayor of New London, Connecticut, Judge of Connecticut Probate Court and Judge of the Court of Common Pleas
