= Effects of the 2008–2010 automotive industry crisis on Canada =

The Canadian auto industry is closely linked to the U.S., due to the Automotive Products Trade Agreement and later the North American Free Trade Agreement (NAFTA), and is in similar trouble. Canada's 3,500 car dealers, which employ 140,000 people, told the federal and Ontario governments in mid-November they are at risk from the financial crisis; they are asking the national government to help out despite a record year of sales. Ottawa is considering providing financial aid to the Canadian subsidiaries of the Big Three, and possibly auto parts companies as well. The auto industry argued that loan guarantees and other help would try to save tens of thousands of Canadian jobs threatened by the sudden drop in North American car sales. Chrysler Canada has asked for $1 billion in aid, making it the only Canadian arm of the Big Three to make a specific dollar request.

Industry analyst Anthony Faria criticized the labor contracts that Canadian Auto Workers then-president Buzz Hargrove negotiated with the Big Three US automobile manufacturers in 2007, predicting that the subprime mortgage crisis and currency would hit Canadian auto production especially hard. Faria noted that UAW president Ron Gettelfinger agreed to have the UAW's "all-in" wage, benefit and pension costs drop from a high of $75.86 per hour in 2007 to an average of about $51 per hour starting in 2010. By comparison, the CAW's cost per hour was $77 in 2007 and will rise to over $80 per hour by the end of the new contract. Faria said that Gettelfinger went into negotiations "with the right intention...Save jobs. The CAW strategy was to squeeze every dime out of them." Hargrove was said to have "instilled backbone and an attitude that the union could always make the auto makers buckle at the bargaining table".

Current union president Ken Lewenza has argued that labor is not responsible for the bankruptcy crisis facing the Big Three automakers, saying that his members would not make concessions part of any taxpayer-funded bailout. "We don't see this as us being the problem", Lewenza said, adding he would "absolutely not" accept any further cuts after losing tens of thousands of jobs in recent years. "We've suffered our share of pain." Lawenza argued that the CAW agreed in 2007 to make concessions that will save the Big Three $900 million over three years.

A spokesman for the Canadian Taxpayers Federation has criticized the CAW's "no-concession" stance, saying that it only serves to strengthen the opposition to a taxpayer-funded bailout for the struggling Detroit Three automakers. The CTF further pointed out that "It is especially difficult to understand anyone asking for government help that refuses to do anything to help itself to begin with", since they "fail to realize they've existed at the substantial largesse of taxpayers for decades". Kelly McParland, a columnist for the National Post, has suggested that "if he won't give anything, he and his members are likely to lose everything." He also said that the problem facing the North American auto industry was borne equally by management and labor alike, criticizing labor for building up pay and benefits for themselves that was as unsustainable as it was enviable, while attacking management for its short-term strategy of selling gas-guzzling trucks and sales tactics (price cuts, rebates, free gas and cash-back schemes).

The CTF has opposed the proposed $3.5 CAD billion bailout for Canadian subsidiaries of the Big Three, saying that it was an unfair financial burden on the average Canadian, as well as another excuse for the Detroit automakers to postpone much needed change. The CTF noted that federal and provincial governments spent $782-million in the past five years on the Big Three, saying "These have been a bottomless pit of requests for cash". Lewenza disagreed, saying that the bailout should be seen by Canadians as a loan that will be paid back when the country's economy is prosperous again.

On December 20, the government of Canada and the province of Ontario offered $3.3 billion in loans to the auto industry. Under the plan GM will receive $3 billion and Chrysler will receive the rest. Ford only asked for a line of credit but will not be participating in the bailout.

The CAW negotiated a cost-cutting deal with General Motors Canada on March 8, 2009. The deal would extend the current contract for an additional year to September 2012, and preserves the current average assembly-worker base pay of about $34 an hour. It would eliminate a $1,700 annual "special bonus," and reduce special paid absences or "SPA days" from two weeks to one week a year, while maintaining vacation entitlements which range up to six weeks a year for high-seniority workers. The deal also introduce payments by members toward their health benefits - $30 monthly per family for workers and $15 a month for pensioners. Lewenza said it also would trim by 35 per cent company contributions to union-provided programs such as child care and wellness programs. Lewenza called the package a "major sacrifice." However, observers noted that the deal did not go far enough; DBRS analyst Kam Hon described it as "not material." Automotive industry consultant Dennis DesRosiers said that General Motors had missed the chance to slash labour costs, pointing out that bankruptcy was a looming threat, Ottawa and Queen's Park demanded cuts to the labour bill as a condition of the bailout, and that the deficit to the pension fund would prevent the CAW from striking. He estimated the total hourly cost of a GM Canada worker, including benefits, is $75 to $78, and saying that "they [GM] got six or seven" when it should have been cut by $20. DesRosiers also said giving up cost-of-living increases is not significant when inflation is nearly non-existent and added that the 40-hour reduction in paid time off merely means "five fewer spa days." University of Toronto professor Joe D'Cruz calculated that it would save $148 million a year, though GM is seeking $6 billion in Canadian government support. CAW autoworkers with seniority were able to maintain 10 weeks of vacation with full pay, while not contributing to their pension fund, relying instead on taxpayers (including these without pensions) to help make up their unfunded liabilities.

The agreement is contingent on Canada being allocated 20% of GM's North American, and getting billions of dollars in federal and provincial taxpayer support, which Lewenza stressed will be loans. However, some suggested that this would not be the final time that automakers would request a bailout. Dennis DesRosiers estimated that GM will go through its government loans in a couple of quarters, long before any recovery in the market. Furthermore, GM Canada president Arturo Elias had admitted to MP Frank Valeriote that GM had pledged all its assets worldwide to the U.S. government in order to secure the first tranche of a US$30-billion loan, leaving no assets to collateralize the $6 billion loan from the Canadian government. The Canadian Taxpayers' Federation noted that between 1982 and 2005, Ottawa handed out over $18.2 billion to corporations, of which only $7.1 billion was repayable, and only $1.3 billion was ever repaid.

Chrysler vice-chairman and president Thomas W. LaSorda (himself the son of a CAW official) and Ford's chief of manufacturing Joe Hinrichs said that the GM-CAW deal was insufficient, suggesting that they would break the CAW's negotiating pattern set by GM. LaSorda told the House of Commons of Canada finance committee that he would demand an hourly wage cut of $20, suggested that Chrysler may withdraw from Canada if it fails to achieve more substantial cost savings from the CAW.

On March 31, 2009, the Canadian federal and Ontario governments jointly rejected the restructuring plans submitted by GM and Chrysler. This came a day after US President Barack Obama had rejected the plans of their parent companies. Both federal Industry Minister Tony Clement and Ontario Premier Dalton McGuinty suggested the CAW's initial deal was insufficient in cutting costs and the union had to return to the bargaining table to make further concessions, in order to show that taxpayers' money is justified. As well, Fiat CEO Sergio Marchionne has asked that the CAW's wages be reduced to the levels of non-unionized workers from Honda and Toyota operating in Canada, or else they would walk away from the proposed alliance with Chrysler, resulting in the latter being forced into bankruptcy.

On May 14, 2018, the Canadian federal government announced it would fall short of breaking even from the bailouts of Chrysler Group LLC and General Motors Co. by $3.5 billion. On June 26, 2018, the remaining undisclosed loan amount was written off. The Fraser Institute estimates the total cost to taxpayers at $3.7 billion that was never repaid.

== See also ==
- 2008–2010 automotive industry crisis
- Chrysler Chapter 11 reorganization
- Effects of the 2008–2010 automotive industry crisis on the United States
- General Motors Chapter 11 reorganization
