= American bailout =

American bailout may refer to:

- Emergency Economic Stabilization Act of 2008
- Troubled Asset Relief Program
- Automotive industry crisis of 2008–2010

== See also ==
- American Recovery and Reinvestment Act of 2009
