= Chrysler Chapter 11 reorganization =

Company reorganization

Chrysler Chapter 11 reorganization was the petition for bankruptcy on April 30, 2009, of Chrysler car company and 24 of its affiliated subsidiaries with the federal bankruptcy court in New York. The court filing occurred upon failure of the company to come to an agreement with its creditors for an outside-of-bankruptcy restructuring plan, by the April 30 deadline mandated by the federal government.

Chrysler was impacted by the automotive industry crisis of 2008–2010 which had contributed the Chapter 11 reorganisation. At the time, Chrysler was controlled by the private investment company, Cerberus Capital Management, which, along with other investors, purchased a majority stake in 2007.

== Background ==
Chrysler LLC and General Motors both carried a substantial debt and interest-cost burden that would make restructuring for future viability difficult, unless bondholders' claims were reduced or exchanged for equity by agreement. The original U.S. government plan was for both companies to enter a Chapter 11 bankruptcy, obtain critical agreements from most stakeholders, and minimize objections, allowing the companies to exit the bankruptcy process without a prolonged battle with stakeholders affected by the filing. Fiat's agreement permitted Fiat to decline to consummate the proposed partnership with the new Chrysler Group company if it were not completed by June 15, 2009, which in turn could force the liquidation of all Chrysler assets.

Four major U.S. financial institutions (including JP Morgan Chase and Bank of America) which had received Troubled Asset Relief Program (TARP) bailout funds from the U.S. federal government held 70 percent of the Chrysler bonds, and agreed to the proposed deal of 33 cents on the dollar. The remaining holders of the debt formed a group known as the Committee of Chrysler Non-Tarp Lenders that accused the TARP bondholders of having a conflict of interest.

Under federal government pressure, most key members of the Non-TARP Lenders acceded to a bankruptcy agreement, raising the total of bondholders agreeing to 92 percent. However, since not all stakeholders had agreed before the deadline, Chrysler filed for bankruptcy on April 30, 2009. In the bankruptcy court, the U.S. government lowered the debt exchange offer to 29 cents on the dollar. The Indiana State Police funds, plaintiffs in the lawsuit, had obtained their Chrysler bonds in July 2008 at 43 cents per dollar of face value.

== Initial court proceedings ==
On Sunday, May 31, 2009, bankruptcy judge Arthur J. Gonzalez approved a proposed government restructuring plan and sale of Chrysler's assets. The sale allows most of the assets of Chrysler to be purchased by a new entity in which Fiat would own 20%, and the autoworker's union retirement health care trust (voluntary benefit association "VEBA") 55%, with the U.S. and Canadian government as minority stakeholders. Secured bondholders would receive 29 cents on the dollar for their claims. The sale was appealed to the New York circuit court, which affirmed the sale on June 5, 2009. The dissident Indiana pension plan bondholders appealed again to the U.S. Supreme Court to block the sale. The U.S. 2nd circuit appeals court stayed its decision, pending a response from the Supreme Court, until 4 pm, June 8, 2009.

On June 8, 2009, Supreme Court Associate Justice Ruth Bader Ginsburg, who handled emergency motions arising from the United States Appeals Court for the Second Circuit, in a one-sentence order, temporarily stayed the orders of the bankruptcy judge allowing the sale, pending further order by Justice Ginsburg or the Supreme Court.

On June 9, 2009, the Supreme Court published its denial of the applications for a stay of the sale from the three Indiana funds, allowing the sale of assets to "New Chrysler" to proceed.

According to the two-page decision and order, the Indiana funds "have not carried the burden" of demonstrating that the Supreme Court needed to intervene. The U.S. Department of the Treasury issued a statement saying: "We are gratified that not a single court that reviewed this matter, including the U.S. Supreme, found any fault whatsoever with the handling of this matter by either Chrysler or the U.S. government." The proposed sale of assets is scheduled to close on June 10, 2009, when the money to finance the deal is wired by the government. Fiat will receive equity in the New Chrysler through its contribution of automobile platforms as a base for a new line of Chrysler cars.

On June 10, 2009, the sale of most of Chrysler assets to "New Chrysler", formally known as Chrysler Group LLC was completed. The federal government financed the deal with US$6.6 billion in financing, paid to the "Old Chrysler", formerly known as Chrysler LLC and currently named Old Carco LLC.

The transfer did not include eight manufacturing locations, nor many parcels of real estate, nor equipment leases. Contracts with 789 U.S. auto dealerships, that were being dropped, were not transferred.

== Pre-bankruptcy negotiations with Fiat ==
On January 20, 2009, Fiat S.p.A. and Chrysler LLC announced that they had a non-binding term sheet to form a global alliance. Under the terms of the potential agreement, Fiat could take a 35% stake in Chrysler and gain access to its North American dealer network in exchange for providing Chrysler with the platform to build smaller, more fuel-efficient vehicles in the U.S. and a reciprocal access to Fiat's global distribution network.

== Agreement with labor unions ==
By mid-April, as talks intensified between the two automakers to reach an agreement by a government-imposed deadline of April 30, Fiat's proposed initial stake was reported to be 20% with some influence on the structure of top management of the company.

However, Fiat had warned that there would be no agreement if Chrysler failed to reach an agreement with the UAW and the Canadian Auto Workers' Union. On April 26, 2009, it appeared as if Chrysler had reached a deal with the unions which would meet federal requirements, though details were not made available. Chrysler said the union agreement "provides the framework needed to ensure manufacturing competitiveness and helps to meet the guidelines set forth by the U.S. Treasury Department."

== Bankruptcy filing ==
Chrysler filed for chapter 11 bankruptcy protection at the Federal Bankruptcy Court of the Southern District of New York, on April 30, 2009, and announced an alliance with Fiat.

Both the White House and Chrysler expressed hope for a "surgical" bankruptcy lasting 30 to 60 days, with the result of reducing the company's liabilities and post-bankruptcy emergence in stronger financial shape. The submitted court documents indicated that there would be a reorganization plan presented to the court in 120 days, on August 28, 2009. A White House official indicated that the government would provide debtor-in-possession financing for between US$3 billion to US$3.5 billion, and upon a completion of Chrysler bankruptcy restructuring and court proceedings, the company would be eligible to receive up to US$4.5 billion in financing to resume operations, for total of US$8 billion of government support. Prior to the bankruptcy filing, Chrysler had received US$4.5 billion in financing from the U.S. government, under a George W. Bush administration plan, in December 2008, after Congress declined to approve legislation to provide federal loans. Between 2007 and 2012, Chrysler benefitted from $1.39 billion in local tax incentives.

A new company will be formed to acquire the assets of Chrysler, which will be known as New CarCo Acquisition LLC.

=== Plant operations suspended ===
Chrysler announced on the day of the bankruptcy filing that during the restructuring it would cease most manufacturing operations on May 4, 2009, and resume production "when the transaction is completed, which is anticipated within 30 to 60 days."

On May 1, the two assembly plants in Canada, Brampton Assembly and Windsor Assembly, both located in Ontario, were shut down indefinitely. The shut downs affected about 2,700 and 4,400 employees respectively. A Chrysler parts plant in Etobicoke, Toronto operated until May 10, 2009, when it was shut down, affecting 300 employees.

Chrysler attorneys said eight of the company's factories, including five with a total of 4800 employees closing in 2010, would not be part of the Fiat deal. The company also announced the retirement of president and vice chairman Tom LaSorda.

Documents showed that the Sterling Heights, Michigan plant, the Detroit Conner Avenue plant and the St. Louis North plant would close, along with the Twinsburg, Ohio parts-stamping plant and the Kenosha, Wisconsin engine plant.

The St. Louis South plant and a Newark, Delaware plant were already closed and should not be sold to Fiat. Work from the Detroit axle plant, also not part of the Fiat deal, was moving to Port Huron, Michigan. The eight plants would be leased by "new Chrysler" and then closed in 2010. As many employees as possible would be offered jobs at other Chrysler plants.

=== Initially approved motions ===
Federal bankruptcy judge Arthur J. Gonzalez approved six motions at a May 1 hearing. At the next hearing on May 4, attorneys were expected to ask Gonzalez for permission to use the $4.5 billion the company had already received from the U.S. and Canadian governments to let the company continue operations. Also expected at the same hearing was a request for a date to sell assets to "new Chrysler." No other bids were expected, but documents showed attempts at deals with dozens of companies, including Renault–Nissan, Toyota, Honda, Volkswagen and General Motors. Banks possessing 70 percent of Chrysler debt agreed to be paid 29 cents on the dollar. But some hedge funds and other creditors that failed to agree with proposed pre-bankruptcy restructuring of debt have yet to approve of the debt restructuring proposed in initial court bankruptcy motions. A health care trust fund owned by the United Auto Workers is proposed to own a 55% stake in the new Chrysler.

=== Procedure to sell assets approved ===
In a setback to the arguments of hold-out creditors, primarily made up of investment firms, Judge Gonzalez on May 5, 2009, approved proposed bidding procedures that would likely lead to Chrysler's sale of assets to an entity in which Fiat is a major owner. The lawyer for the dissident creditors holding US$300 million of a total US$6.9 billion of secured debt in Chrysler argued that proposed sale procedures preclude other potential bidders. The plan is for several major Chrysler assets to be sold to a new entity jointly owned by the United Automobile Workers Union health care trust fund, Fiat, and the United States and Canadian governments.

=== Dealership closures ===
On May 14, 2009, Chrysler filed with the bankruptcy court to terminate the dealership agreements of 789, or about 25% of its dealerships.

=== Sale to "New Chrysler" ===
On Sunday, May 31, 2009, bankruptcy Judge Arthur J. Gonzalez approved a proposed plan, rejecting more than 300 filed objections to the sale. The sale allows for most of the assets of Chrysler to be purchased by new entity in which Fiat would own 20%, the autoworker's union retirement health care trust (voluntary benefit association "VEBA") 55%; the U.S. Government and Canadian government would be minority stakeholders. Secured bondholders would receive 29 cents on the dollar for their claims.

A group of dissident Indiana pension fund secured bondholders immediately appealed Gonzalez's decision, to the 2nd Circuit Court of Appeals in New York; the appeal is known as Indiana State Police Pension Trust v. Chrysler. The plaintiffs claimed that the Department of the Treasury treated Chrysler's secured creditors in a manner that is contrary to that called for under U.S. bankruptcy law, that it is the first time in the history of more than 150 years of American bankruptcy law when secured creditors received less than unsecured creditors, and that it violated the Fifth Amendment's clause that private property cannot be taken without due process of law. The funds include teachers and police officers funds, holding about $42.5 million in face value of Chrysler's $6.9 billion (~$10 billion in 2025) in secured debt; the secured debt has priority for repayment. Holders of 92 percent of that class of debt agreed to a proposed government that would exchange debt for a value of 29 cents on the dollar. The Indiana funds obtained their bonds in July 2008 at 43 cents per the dollar of face value.

The federal appeals court on June 5, 2009, affirmed the decision to approve the sale of its assets, and gave objecting bondholders until Monday, June 8, 2009, to obtain a stay of the reaffirmed decision permitting the sale to be completed.

On June 8, 2009, Supreme Court Associate Justice Ruth Bader Ginsburg, who is assigned to emergency motions arising from the United States Appeals Court for the Second Circuit, in a one-sentence order, stayed the orders of the bankruptcy judge allowing the sale, pending further order by Justice Ginsburg or the Supreme Court. Fiat had the right to withdraw from the deal if it does not close by June 15; however, the head of Fiat said it "would never walk away" from the Chrysler deal, even if it did not close by June 15. According to U.S. government lawyers, Fiat walking away would leave Chrysler without a viable purchase plan and result in a likely liquidation.

On June 9, 2009, the Supreme Court published its denial of the applications for a stay of the sale from the three Indiana funds, allowing the sale of assets to "New Chrysler" to proceed.

According to the two-page decision and order, the Indiana funds "have not carried the burden" of demonstrating that the Supreme Court needed to intervene. The U.S. Department of the Treasury issued a statement saying: "We are gratified that not a single court that reviewed this matter, including the U.S. Supreme, found any fault whatsoever with the handling of this matter by either Chrysler or the U.S. government." The proposed sale of assets is scheduled to close on Wednesday, June 10, 2009, when the money to finance the deal is wired by the government. Fiat will receive equity in the New Chrysler through its contribution of automobile platforms as a base for a new line of Chrysler cars.

On June 10, 2009, the sale of most of Chrysler assets to "New Chrysler", formally known as Chrysler Group LLC was completed. The federal government financed the deal with US$6.6 billion in financing, paid to the "Old Chrysler", formerly named Chrysler LLC and now currently named Old Carco LLC.

The transfer does not include eight manufacturing locations, nor many parcels of real estate, nor equipment leases. Contracts with 789 U.S. auto dealerships, which are being dropped, were not transferred.

=== Initial equity structure ===
Initially, the percentages of equity ownership in Fiat Chrysler Automobiles are: Fiat, 20 percent; U.S. government, 9.85 percent; Canadian government, 2.46 percent; and the UAW retiree medical fund 67.69 percent, according to bankruptcy court documents.

== See also ==
- General Motors Chapter 11 reorganization
- Automotive industry crisis of 2008–2010
