= Blythe McGarvie =

Blythe J. McGarvie is a corporate director. She has been President and CEO of Leadership for International Finance, LLC, (LIF) and was a senior lecturer at Harvard Business School.

== Education ==
McGarvie earned an MBA degree from Kellogg Graduate School of Management at Northwestern University in 1978 and is a Certified Public Accountant.

== Career ==
At Harvard, McGarvie teaches the MBA required curriculum course Financial Reporting and Control. She has taught at the school since July 2012.

McGarvie was at LIF, a firm focusing on improving clients' financial positions and providing leadership seminars for corporate and academic groups, from January 2003, according to a 2009 Forbes profile. LIF specialized in providing global perspectives to U.S. and multinational companies, primarily in the consumer goods, financial services and knowledge-based industries. LIF is based in Williamsburg, Virginia, with offices in Los Angeles, London, Chicago, and Boston.

McGarvie also served as:

- Director, Accenture Plc., Dublin, Ireland, services/management services company; since October 2001
- Director, Wawa, Inc., Wawa, Pennsylvania
- Director, LKQ Corporation, an S&P 400 distributor of replacement parts, components and systems for cars and trucks; director since March 2012

From 1999 through the end of 2002, McGarvie was the Executive Vice President and Chief financial officer (CFO) at BIC Group, a leading manufacturer of convenient disposable products. She served as Senior Vice President and Chief Financial Officer of Hannaford Bros. Co., a New England/New York food retailer, from 1994 to 1999.

McGarvie, earlier, served as a director of:

- Viacom, Inc. Class B, New York, NY; until February 2017
- Lafarge North America, a construction-materials company with headquarters in Herndon, Virginia, until May 2006. *Travelers Companies, a financial/property & casualty insurance company
- Pepsi Bottling Group Inc, a consumer goods/beverages-soft drinks company.

== Writings ==
Starting with a visit to China in March–April 2009, and continuing into 2010, McGarvie has been posting periodically on Huffington Post. Subjects have included the Shanghai World Expo, a recommendation of The Forgotten Man by Amity Shlaes on the occasion of President Barack Obama's first 100 days, a visit to Disney World's Epcot and economic indicators, and the Davos World Economic Forum. Over roughly the same period, McGarvie has been issuing and posting a one- to two-page newsletter.

In January 2009, John Wiley & Sons published McGarvie's book Shaking the Globe: Courageous Decision-Making in a Changing World with a foreword by Robert Kraft.

McGarvie addressed the auto industry crisis of 2008-9 with a call for GM's bankruptcy, and the prevalence of female corporate directors, in two articles in Forbes in 2008 and 2007 respectively.

In October 2005, McGraw-Hill published McGarvie's book Fit In, Stand Out: Mastering the FISO Factor in hardcover by in October, 2005.

At the time of FISO's publication, McGarvie was featured in a "Career Couch" Q&A in The New York Times on the subject of how to react "when your new boss reverses popular policies of the previous boss."

In 2002, McGarvie was featured in another Times article on the subject of female representation on corporate boards.

McGarvie has also been featured in CFO magazine, and Fast Company. She has appeared on CNBC, and writes the Corporate Leadership column for Shattered magazine. Consumer Goods Technology featured Blythe in a 2002 cover story (“World Class CFO”) and a Business Finance cover story featured her in a piece on “Financial Reporting: How the Best CFOs Get it Right the First Time.”

== Honors ==
McGarvie received the Kellogg Graduate School of Management Schaffner Award, presented to an alumnus/-a who is pre-eminent in his or her field and who provided outstanding service to Kellogg. In 2003, she was appointed as Senior Fellow of The Kellogg Innovation Network.

== Personal ==
She is married to Mark McGarvie, a professor of history at the University of Richmond.
