= Diana Farrell =

American government official

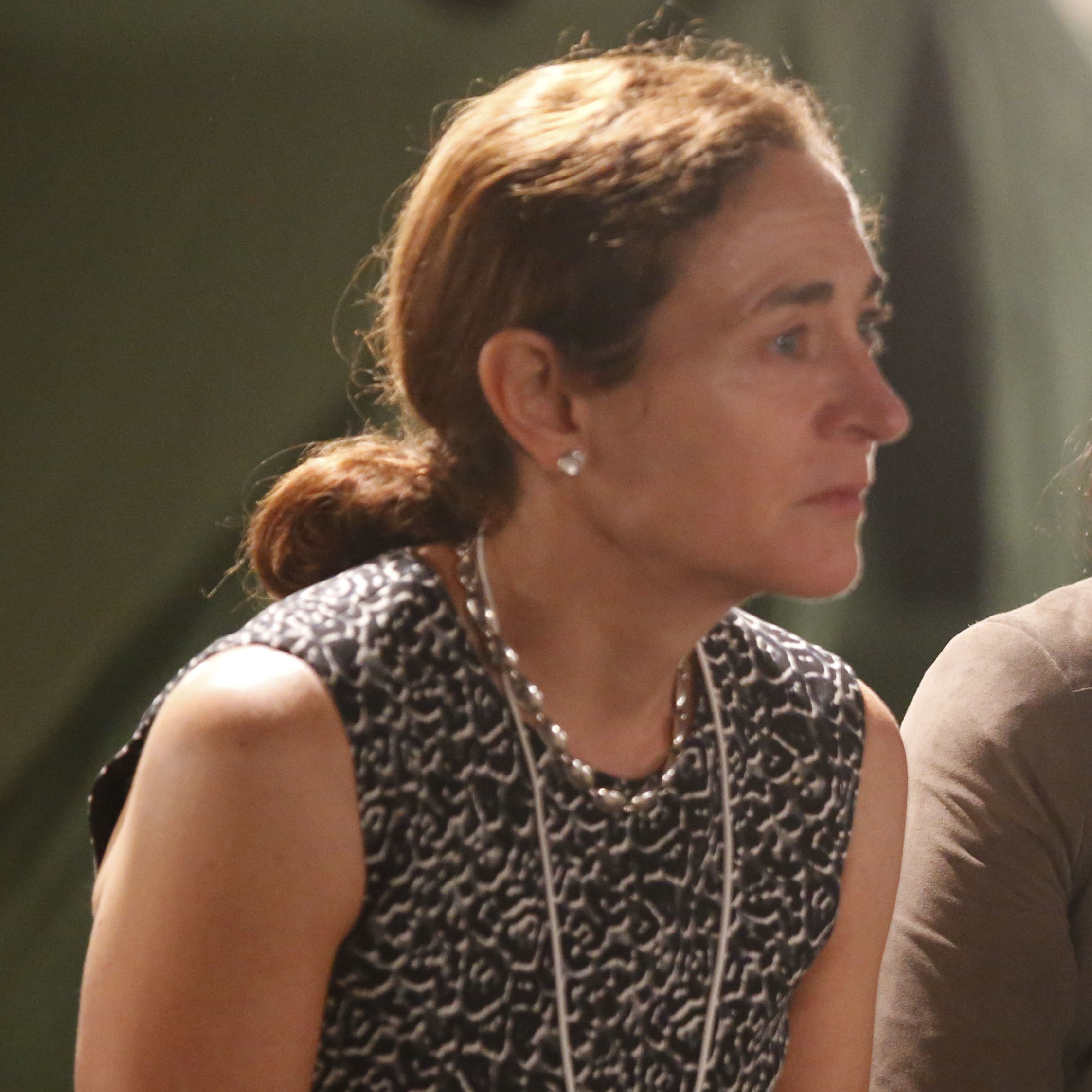

Personal details
- Born: March 16, 1965 (age 61) Bogotá, Colombia
- Party: Democratic
- Spouse: Scott Pearson
- Children: 2
- Education: Wesleyan University (BA); Harvard University (MBA)

Diana Farrell is a banker and political advisor who served until 2021 as the founding President and Chief Executive Officer of the JPMorgan Chase Institute, a think tank. Previously, Ms. Farrell was the Global Head of the McKinsey Center for Government (MCG), providing research, proprietary data, and other tools to support government leaders focused on improving performance. In addition, she was a leader of McKinsey’s global Public Sector Practice, and a member of their Partner Review Committee.

From 2009 to 2011, Farrell was Deputy Director of the United States National Economic Council (NEC) and Deputy Assistant on Economic Policy to President Barack Obama. She was also a member of the Presidential Task Force on the Auto Industry.

== Life and career ==
Farrell attended the Loomis Chaffee School, a college-preparatory boarding school in Connecticut, before attaining a B.A. from Wesleyan University in Economics (College of Social Studies) and an M.B.A. from Harvard Business School. She is a member of Council on Foreign Relations, the Aspen Strategy Group, the Aspen Program on the World Economy, the Bretton Woods Committee, and the Trilateral Commission. She is a member of the World Economic Forum Global Agenda Council and was Vice-Chair of the organization’s Future of Government Global Agenda Council. She served on the Wesleyan University board of trustees and is married with two children.

Prior to serving in government, Farrell was the Director of the McKinsey Global Institute (MGI), McKinsey & Company's economics research arm. While at McKinsey she was also a leader of the Global Financial Institutions and Global Strategy practices. Prior to joining McKinsey, she worked for Goldman Sachs in New York.

During the Obama Administration, Farrell served as Deputy Director of the United States National Economic Council and as a member of the Presidential Task Force on the Auto Industry after the 2008 financial crisis. While at the White House, Farrell directed interagency processes for the administration’s financial regulatory reform, housing and housing-finance policy, and innovation and competitiveness agendas.

On November 22, 2010, Farrell announced that she would be leaving the administration by the end of the year. Lawrence Summers, then the Director of the NEC, who had previously announced that he would return at the end of the year to Harvard University, noted that Farrell had "played a central role" in the efforts of the administration to encourage economic growth, restructure the auto industry, and respond to the housing crisis. Summers further stated: "Her natural talent as a policy maker and her good judgment made her invaluable in setting a course for economic recovery."

== Research and political views ==
In 2003, Farrell was the author of a paper in which she argued that sending American jobs overseas might be "as beneficial to the U.S. as to the destination country, probably more so." In a video for the McKinsey Global Institute, where she formerly served as a director, Farrell describes four "newly powerful" brokers. One of these is "Asian economies which are...generating significant surpluses."

Farrell has stated that she would like to see more alumni of the corporate sector serving in government, stating in an interview that "This is my first time serving in government — I came from the private sector — and I just think it is a fantastic thing for people to do, for people in the private sector to serve in government, to serve their country, and to really understand what a very large fraction of the economy and society is all about and how this works."

After the 2008 financial crisis, Farrell argued that governments had "overextended themselves" in the aftermath of the recession and called for "structural reforms" in an October 2012 interview.

Farrell is a supporter of regulation of large banks. In an interview with National Public Radio, she stated: "We have created them, and we're sort of past that point, and I think that in some sense, the genie's out of the bottle and what we need to do is to manage them and to oversee them, as opposed to hark back to a time that we're unlikely to ever come back to or want to come back to."

== Selected publications ==
"Government by Design: Four Principles for a Better Public Sector", McKinsey Center for Government, December 2013

"Education to Employment: Designing a System That Works", McKinsey Center for Government, December 2012

"Government Designed for New Times", McKinsey Center for Government, October 2012

“New but not yet normal: Corporate and investment banking in transition”, McKinsey on Corporate & Investment Banking, September 2010

“Changing the fortunes of America's workforce: A human capital challenge”, McKinsey Global Institute, June 2009

“Promoting energy efficiency in the developing world”, McKinsey Quarterly, February 2009

“Why Americans pay more for health care”, McKinsey Quarterly, December 2008

“Leading through uncertainty”, McKinsey Quarterly, December 2008

“The challenge of reforming Japan’s health system”, McKinsey Global Institute, November 2008

“Why baby boomers will need to work longer”, McKinsey Quarterly, November 2008

“New thinking for a new financial order”, Harvard Business Review, September 2008

“Capturing the European energy productivity opportunity”, McKinsey Global Institute, September 2008

“Boosting Europe’s energy productivity”, Businessweek, September 2008

“China’s urbanization means rich rewards for business”, Businessweek, September 2008

“How the world should invest in energy efficiency”, McKinsey Quarterly, July 2008

“The rise of the euro”, Businessweek, March 2008

“Investing the Gulf’s oil profits windfall”, McKinsey Quarterly, May 2008

“The challenge of funding Japan’s future health care needs”, McKinsey Global Institute, March 2008

“Gulf states must use oil wealth wisely”, Businessweek, February 2008

“Long-term trends in global capital markets”, McKinsey Quarterly, February 2008

“The new role of oil wealth in the world economy”, McKinsey Quarterly, January 2008

Offshoring: Understanding the Emerging Global Labor Market, Harvard Business Press Books, 2006

Driving Growth: Breaking Down Barriers to Global Prosperity, Harvard Business Press Books, 2006

Productivity Imperative: Wealth and Poverty in the Global Economy, Harvard Business Press Books, 2006

“Smarter offshoring”, Harvard Business Review, June 2006

Market Unbound, Wiley & Sons, 1996
