= David Wyss =

American economist

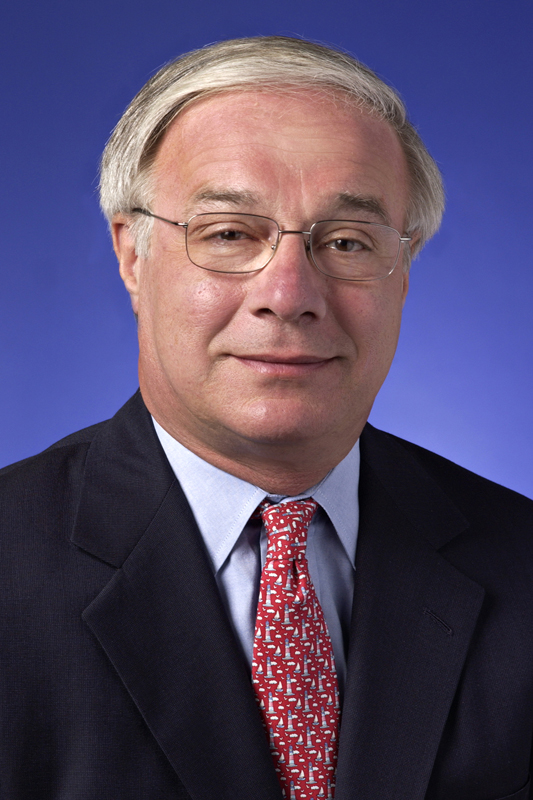

Academic background
- Education: Harvard University; MIT

Academic work
- Discipline: Macroeconomics; Financial economics
- Institutions: Standard & Poor's

David Wyss is an American economist. As New York-based Standard & Poor's chief economist, Wyss was responsible for S & P's economic forecasts and publications. He also coauthored the monthly Equity Insight and the weekly Financial Notes. He was on the board of the National Association for Business Economics, Washington, D.C.

Wyss joined Data Resources Inc., Lexington, Massachusetts, in 1979 as an economist in the European Economic Service in London, which was acquired by McGraw-Hill. He came back to the United States in 1983 as chief financial economist for DRI/McGraw-Hill, became chief economist for Standard & Poor's DRI in 1992, and chief economist for Standard & Poor's in 1999, succeeding David Blitzer.

Before joining DRI, Wyss was a senior staff economist with the Council of Economic Advisers during the Presidency of Jimmy Carter, senior economist at the Federal Reserve Board and an economic adviser to the Bank of England.

Wyss holds a B.Sc. from the Massachusetts Institute of Technology which he got in 1966, and a Ph.D. in economics from Harvard University which he got in 1971.

David Wyss currently teaches economics at Brown University.
