= Presidential Task Force on the Auto Industry =

United States task force

The Presidential Task Force on the Auto Industry was an ad hoc group of United States cabinet-level and other officials that was formed by President Barack Obama to deal with the financial bailout of automakers Chrysler and General Motors.

Based on an assessment that automobile manufacturing was a critical sector of the economy providing 3 to 4 million jobs for Americans, that liquidation was imminent for two of the three major U.S. automakers, and that the break ups would devastate the U.S. economy, the U.S. government became involved in the day-to-day management decisions of Chrysler and General Motors through the Task Force.

The Presidential Task Force formed and started holding meetings in February 2009. It reviewed financial and operational restructuring plans submitted by Chrysler and General Motors (GM) and made its own specific recommendations at cabinet level meetings to the President regarding the restructurings and the requests for funds from the companies. Recommendations also included directives on improving wage and benefit structures, and developing competitive fuel efficient cars for the future. In March 2009, the Task Force recommended up to $5 billion in support for automotive industry suppliers, and by late May 2009, following the recommendations of the Task Force, the U.S. government had lent approximately $25 billion in total to the companies. At that time, it was estimated that GM might require $30 billion more to emerge from bankruptcy. By mid-July 2009, both companies had restructured and emerged from bankruptcy. The Task Force was scaled back from "day to day" involvement to periodic "monitoring".

According to an April 2014 report of the Special Inspector General of the Troubled Asset Relief Program, the U.S. government had lost $11.2 billion (~$15 billion in 2025) in its rescue of General Motors. The U.S. government spent $50 billion to bail out GM, meaning it recovered 77.6 percent of its investment amount.

== Members and official designees ==
The Task Force was composed of the following cabinet members and public officials:

=== Members ===
- Co-chairs:
  - Secretary of the Treasury, Tim Geithner
  - National Economic Council Director, Larry Summers
- Secretary of Transportation
- Secretary of Commerce
- Secretary of Labor
- Secretary of Energy
- Chair of the President’s Council of Economic Advisers, Christina Romer
- Director of the Office of Management and Budget, Peter R. Orszag
- Environmental Protection Agency Administrator
- Director of the White House Office of Energy and Climate Change
- Lead Auto Advisor at the Treasury Department, Steven Rattner
- Senior Advisor on Auto Issues at the Treasury Department, Ron Bloom

Senior Advisor on Auto Issues at the Treasury Department, Harry Wilson

=== Official designees ===
Of the Members of the Presidential Task Force:

- Diana Farrell, Deputy Director, National Economic Council
- Gene Sperling, Counselor to the Secretary of Treasury
- Jared Bernstein, Chief Economist to Vice President Biden
- Jay Williams, Senior Advisor, Department of Labor
- Lisa Heinzerling, Senior Climate Policy Counsel to the EPA Administrator
- Austan Goolsbee, Staff Director and Chief Economist of the Economic Recovery Advisory Board
- Dan Utech, Senior Advisor to the Secretary of Energy
- Heather Zichal, Deputy Director, White House Office of Energy and Climate Change
- Joan DeBoer, Chief of Staff, Department of Transportation
- Rick Wade, Senior Advisor, Department of Commerce

=== Staff ===
- Brian Deese, special assistant to the president for economic policy

== See also ==
- Automotive industry crisis of 2008–2010
- Corporate welfare
- Effects of the 2008–2010 automotive industry crisis on the United States
- List of U.S. executive branch czars
