= Gary Burtless =

American economist

Gary Burtless (born April 11, 1950) is an American economist. He received his A.B. from Yale University in 1972 and his Ph.D. from the Massachusetts Institute of Technology in 1977. He worked as an economist from the U.S. Department of Health, Education, and Welfare from 1977 to 1979 and the U.S. Department of Labor from 1979 to 1981.

He currently serves as senior fellow of Economic Studies at the Brookings Institution. His main areas of expertise are "labor market policy, income distribution, population aging, social insurance, household saving, and the behavioral effects of taxes and government transfers."

== Publications ==
According to Amazon.com Burtless has published the following books:

- (2007). Brookings-Wharton Papers on Urban Affairs 2007. (co-authored with Janet Rothenberg Pack).
- (2006). Brookings-Wharton Papers on Urban Affairs 2006. (co-authored with Janet Rothenberg Pack).
- (1998). Aging Societies: The Global Dimension. (co-authored with Barry Bosworth).
- (1998). Globaphobia: Confronting Fears About Open Trade.
- (1996). Five Years After: The Long-Term Effects of Welfare-To-Work Programs. (co-authored with Daniel Friedlander).
- (1996). Does Money Matter?: The Effect of School Resources on Student Achievement and Adult Success.
- (1993). Growth with Equity: Economic Policymaking for the Next Century. (co-authored with Martin Neil Baily).
- (1990). A Future of Lousy Jobs?: The Changing Structure of U.S. Wages.
- (1989). Can America Afford to Grow Old: Paying for Social Security. (co-authored with Henry J. Aaron and Barry P. Bosworth).
- (1987). Work, Health and Income Among the Elderly (Studies in Social Economics).
