= 2008–2010 automotive industry crisis =

Part of the 2008 financial crisis

The 2008–2010 automotive industry crisis formed part of the 2008 financial crisis and the resulting Great Recession. The crisis affected European and Asian automobile manufacturers, but it was primarily felt in the American automobile manufacturing industry. The downturn also affected Canada by virtue of the Automotive Products Trade Agreement.

The automotive industry was weakened by a substantial increase in the prices of automotive fuels linked to the 2003–2008 energy crisis which discouraged purchases of sport utility vehicles (SUVs) and pickup trucks which have low fuel economy. The popularity and relatively high profit margins of these vehicles had encouraged the American "Big Three" automakers, General Motors, Ford, and Chrysler to make them their primary focus. With fewer fuel-efficient models to offer to consumers, sales began to slide. By 2008, the situation had turned critical as the 2008 financial crisis placed pressure on the prices of raw materials.

Car companies from Asia, Europe, North America, and elsewhere implemented creative marketing strategies to entice reluctant consumers as most experienced double-digit percentage declines in sales. Major manufacturers, including the Big Three and Toyota, offered substantial discounts across their product lineups. The Big Three faced criticism for their mix of available vehicle types offered, which faced criticism for being ill-suited to a climate of rising fuel prices. North American consumers turned to smaller, cheaper, more fuel-efficient imports from Japan and Europe.

== Asia ==
=== China ===
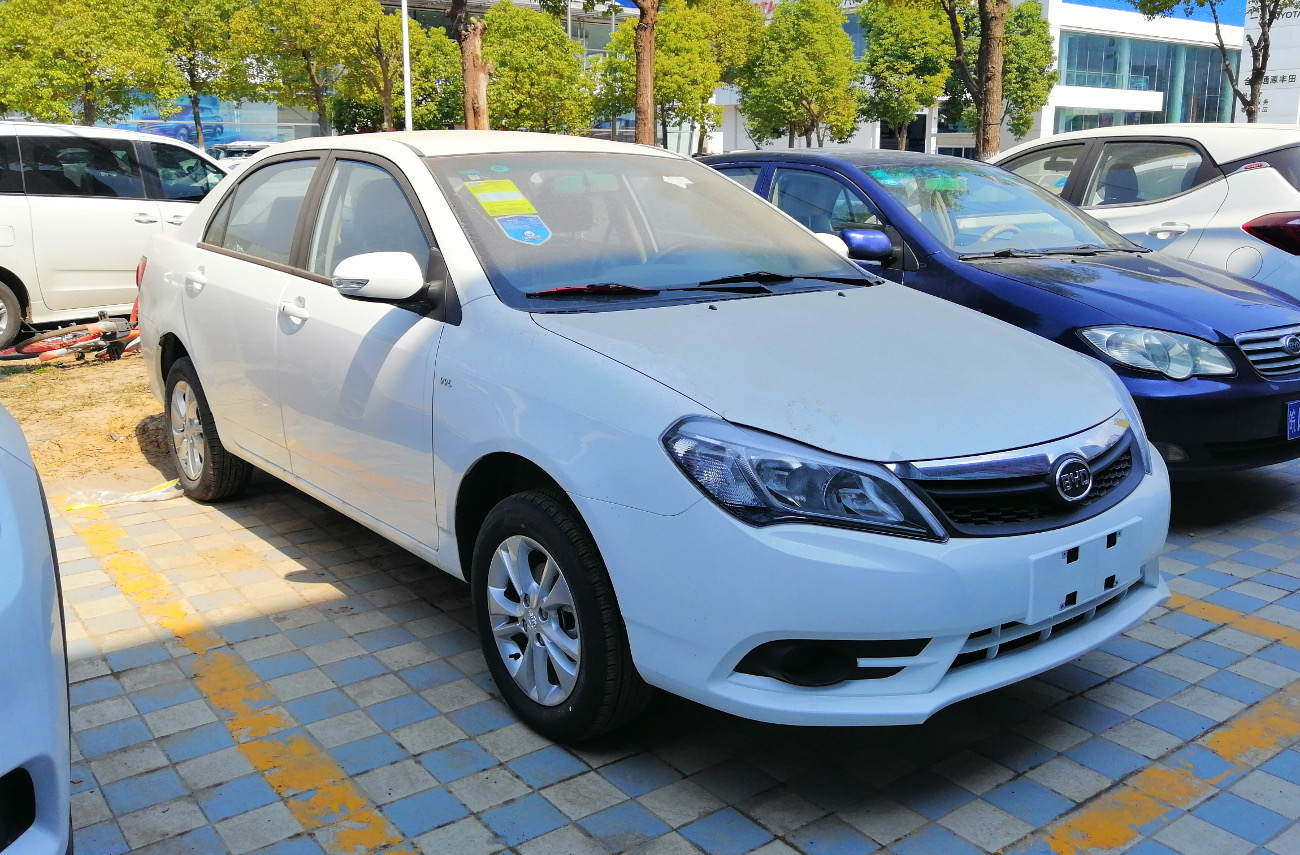
The BYD F3, the world's first production model plug-in hybrid car

In 2008, the Chinese government reduced automotive taxes in order to spur flagging sales.

In 2008, a plug-in hybrid version of the BYD F3 compact sedan was introduced, the world's first production model plug-in hybrid car.

In January 2009, Chinese auto-manufacturer Chery reported unprecedented monthly sales. (See also Automobile industry in China)

=== India ===
Citing falling production numbers, the State Bank of India reduced interest rates on automotive loans in February 2009.

For the first few months of 2009, Tata Motors conducted a widespread marketing campaign heralding the debut of the Tata Nano. Billed as "the people's car", the manufacturer hopes the low cost will encourage customers to purchase the vehicle despite the ongoing credit crisis.

=== Japan ===
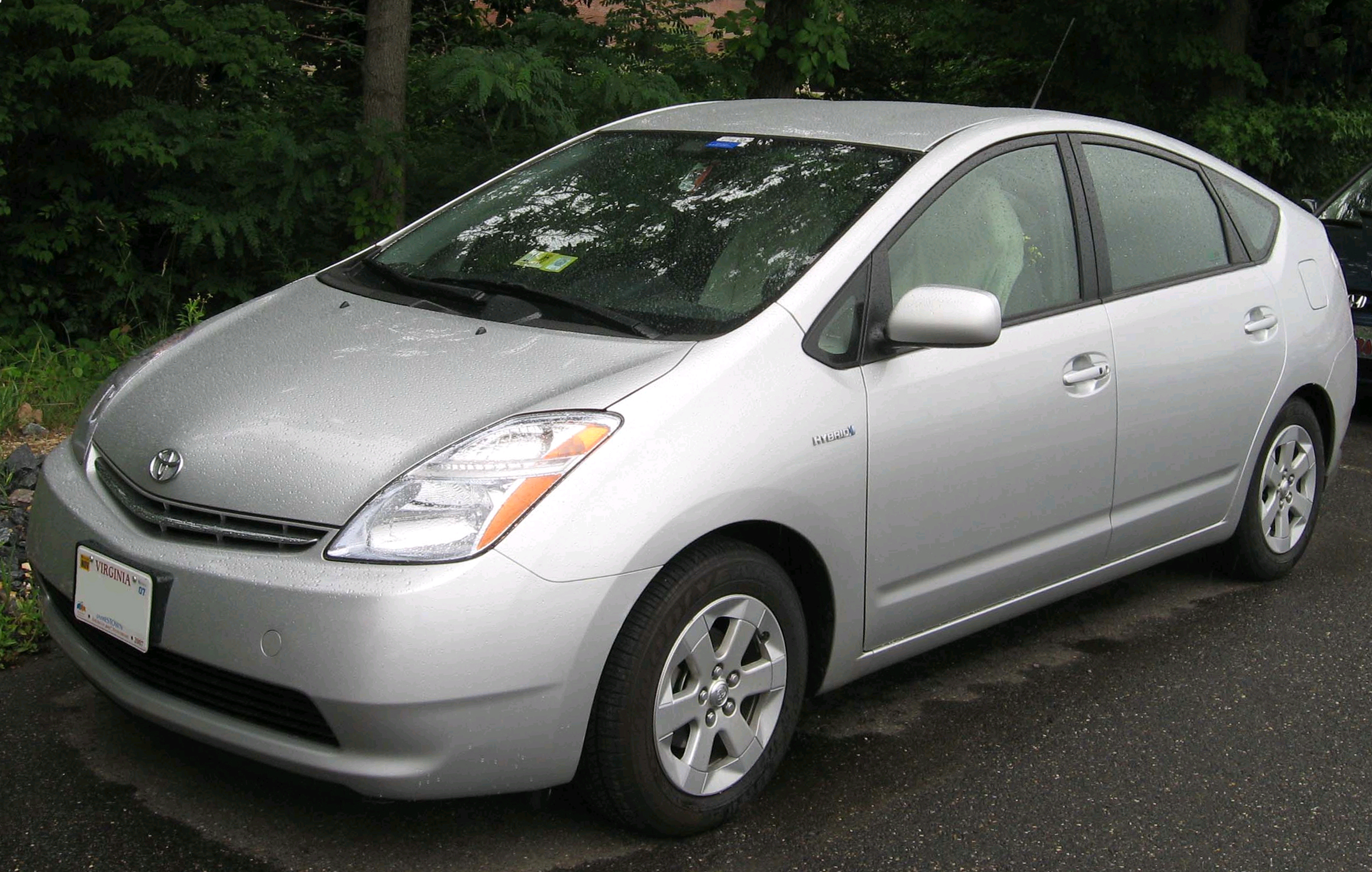
The Toyota Prius is one of Toyota's Hybrid Fuel efficient vehicles which have moved in and out of short supply.

With high gas prices and a weak US economy in the summer of 2008, Toyota reported a double-digit decline in sales for the month of June, similar to figures reported by the Detroit Big Three. For Toyota, these were attributed mainly to slow sales of its Tundra pickup, as well as shortages of its fuel-efficient vehicles such as the Prius, Corolla and Yaris. In response, the company has announced plans to idle its truck plants, while shifting production at other facilities to manufacture in-demand vehicles. On December 22, 2008, Toyota declared that it expected the first time loss in 70 years in its core vehicle-making business. Loss of $1.7 billion, in its group operating revenue, would be its first operating loss since 1938 (Company was founded in 1937). Toyota saw its sales drop 33.9 percent and Honda Motor by 31.6 percent.

On 5 December 2008 Honda Motor Company announced that it would be exiting Formula One race with immediate effect due to the 2008 economic crisis and are looking to sell the team. Honda has predicted that there may be reductions among part-time and contract staff. Upper management bonuses would also be reassessed and directors in the company will take a 10 percent pay cut effective January 2009.

Nissan, another leading Japanese car manufacturer, announced that it also would be slashing production and will reduce its output by 80,000 vehicles in the first few months of 2009.

In December 2008, Suzuki, Japan's fourth biggest car manufacturer, announced that it will cut production in Japan by about 30,000 units due to falling demand. The company is expected to face its first profit drop in eight years for financial year ending in March 2009.

On 16 December 2008, Fuji Heavy Industries, Japan's largest transport equipment manufacturer and the maker of Subaru brand cars, announced that it would exiting World Rally Championship at the end of the 2008 championship, "this sudden decision was in response to the widespread economic downturn that is affecting the entire automotive industry", and came one day after competitor Suzuki exited the sport.

Reported in Bloomberg on December 23, 2008, that Mitsubishi Motors is to widen production cuts on falling demand. The Japanese maker of Outlander sport-utility vehicles, will scrap the night shifts at two domestic factories as the deepening global recession saps auto demand. The carmaker will halt the night shift at its Mizushima plant, excluding the minicar line. Nighttime work at the Okazaki factory will stop from February 2. The cuts are part of Mitsubishi's move to reduce planned output by 110,000 vehicles in the year ending March because of tumbling sales in Japan, the U.S. and Europe. Japan's vehicle sales may fall to the lowest in 31 years in 2009, according to the country's automobile manufacturers association. Mitsubishi will also halt production of passenger cars on every Friday next month at the Mizushima factory in western Japan. The Okazaki plant in central Japan will close every Saturday in January and for another five days.

Toyota, on December 22, 2008, slashed profit forecasts amid a sales slump. The Japanese automaker, often held up with Honda as a success story for the rest of the auto industry to follow, said it expected a slim profit margin of US$555 million for the year ending in March 2009. Toyota had originally been projecting a massive profit of $13.9 billion for that period. Their sales in the United States were down 34 per cent and were down 34 per cent in Europe as well. They expected a loss which would be the equivalent of about $2 billion (CDN)." Toyota President Katsuaki Watanabe said the impact on the company from the struggling global economy has been "faster, wider and deeper than expected." "The change that has hit the world economy is of a critical scale that comes once in a hundred years," Watanabe said, speaking in Nagoya. Facing its first loss in nearly sixty years, Toyota sought loans from the Japanese government.

On November 4, 2009, Toyota announced its immediate withdrawal from Formula One, ending the team's involvement in the sport after eight seasons. See also 2009–2010 Toyota vehicle recalls.

=== South Korea ===
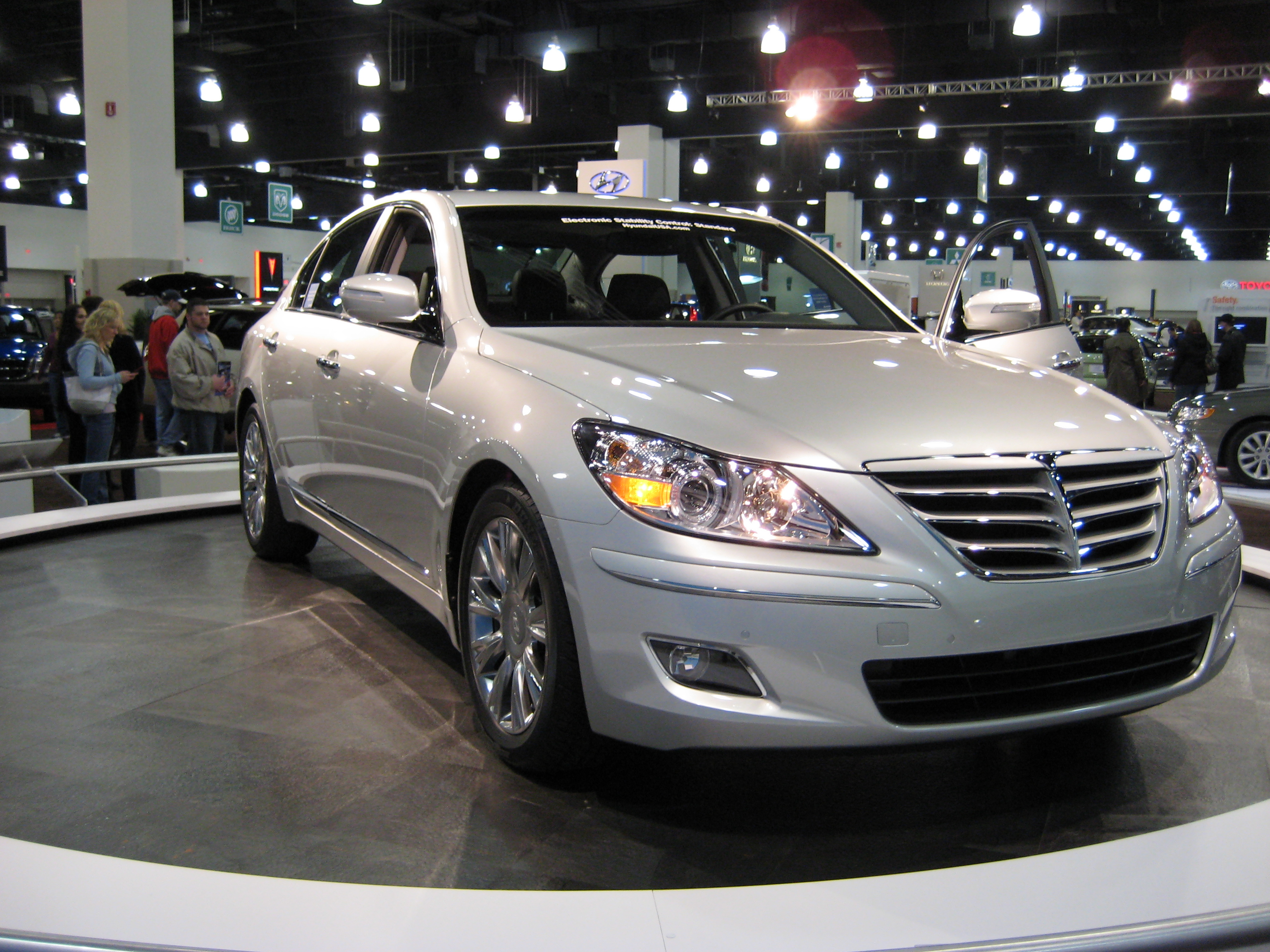
The Hyundai Genesis named the 2009 North American Car of the Year

South Korean automakers have been generally much more profitable than their US and Japanese counterparts, recording strong growth even in depressed markets such as the United States. Despite a global economic slowdown, Hyundai-Kia successfully managed to overtake Honda Motor in 2008 as the world's 5th largest automaker, climbing eight rankings in less than a decade. Hyundai-Kia continued its rapid success in 2009, when only a year after overtaking Honda, it surpassed Ford Motor as the world's 4th largest automaker.

Hyundai-Kia's continued success was unusual at a time when most automakers saw their sales falling sharply, with leading automaker GM even filing for bankruptcy. Hyundai-Kia took significant advantage of the prolonged automotive crisis by producing affordable yet high quality and well designed vehicles. Rapid globalization has seen state of the art factories being built in several countries including Slovakia, the United States and China. The manufacturing facilities have been geared-up to build products that are designed and engineered for local markets. The Kia Cee'd is a leading example, being designed, developed and engineered in Germany and built in Slovakia.

Unlike others, this crisis turned into an opportunity for many South Korean automakers. Hyundai, a korean automaker, offered customers who have lost their jobs to return a new-car purchase for a refund. The continued growth and success is attributable to the country's fuel-efficient and well-equipped, yet affordable cars with generous warranties, such as the Kia Picanto, Kia Cee'd and Hyundai i30. These models attracted global consumers at a time of severe economic recession, rapidly rising oil prices and increasing environmental concerns. South Korean automakers therefore had a competitive advantage against expensive luxury vehicles and SUVs from US, Japanese and German automakers.

During the fourth quarter of 2008 to the first quarter of 2009, which was the height of this automotive crisis, the extremely weak South Korean won, especially against the US dollar and Japanese yen, significantly boosted the price competitiveness of South Korean exports in key markets. Another factor that helped maintain this momentum was an increasingly improving brand awareness, attributable to the introduction of the country's own luxury vehicles such as the Hyundai Genesis and Hyundai Genesis Coupe, which received highly positive awards in the press and reviews. Hyundai's brand grew by 9% in 2008, surpassing Porsche and Ferrari, while it used the Super Bowl football broadcast, the world's most expensive commercial air time, to promote the Hyundai brand in the United States.

Nonetheless, South Korean automakers were not completely immune to this automotive crisis and in December 2008 Hyundai Motor Company had begun reducing production at plants in the U.S., China, Slovakia, India and Turkey because of sluggish demand. The company missed an earlier projection of 4.8 million units for 2008 and announced a freeze of wages for administrative workers and shortened factory operations as demand weakened amid the 2008 financial crisis.

South Korea's fourth largest automaker, SsangYong Motor, owned by the Chinese automobile manufacturer SAIC (Shanghai Automotive Industry Corporation), is the worst affected company in this crisis as it manufactures mainly heavy petroleum consuming SUVs. The carmaker recorded its fourth straight quarterly losses by the end of 2008 with red ink of $20.8 million in the third quarter. Also during the July to September period, sales dropped 63 percent to 3,835 vehicles. Its production lines have been idle since December 17 as part of efforts to reduce its inventory. The automaker has halted production twice previously this year. In December 2008, SAIC gave an ultimatum to the SsangYong union to accept its restructuring plan or face the parent company's withdrawal, which, if implemented, would mean certain bankruptcy. A 70% share of SsangYong was acquired by India's Mahindra & Mahindra Limited in February 2011.

However, the South Korean Ministry of Knowledge Economy said that there will be no liquidity provision at the government level for five automakers - Hyundai, Kia, GM Daewoo, Samsung Renault and Ssangyong."We have no plans to inject liquidity into the carmakers," a ministry official said. "It has been repeatedly made clear."

=== Taiwan ===
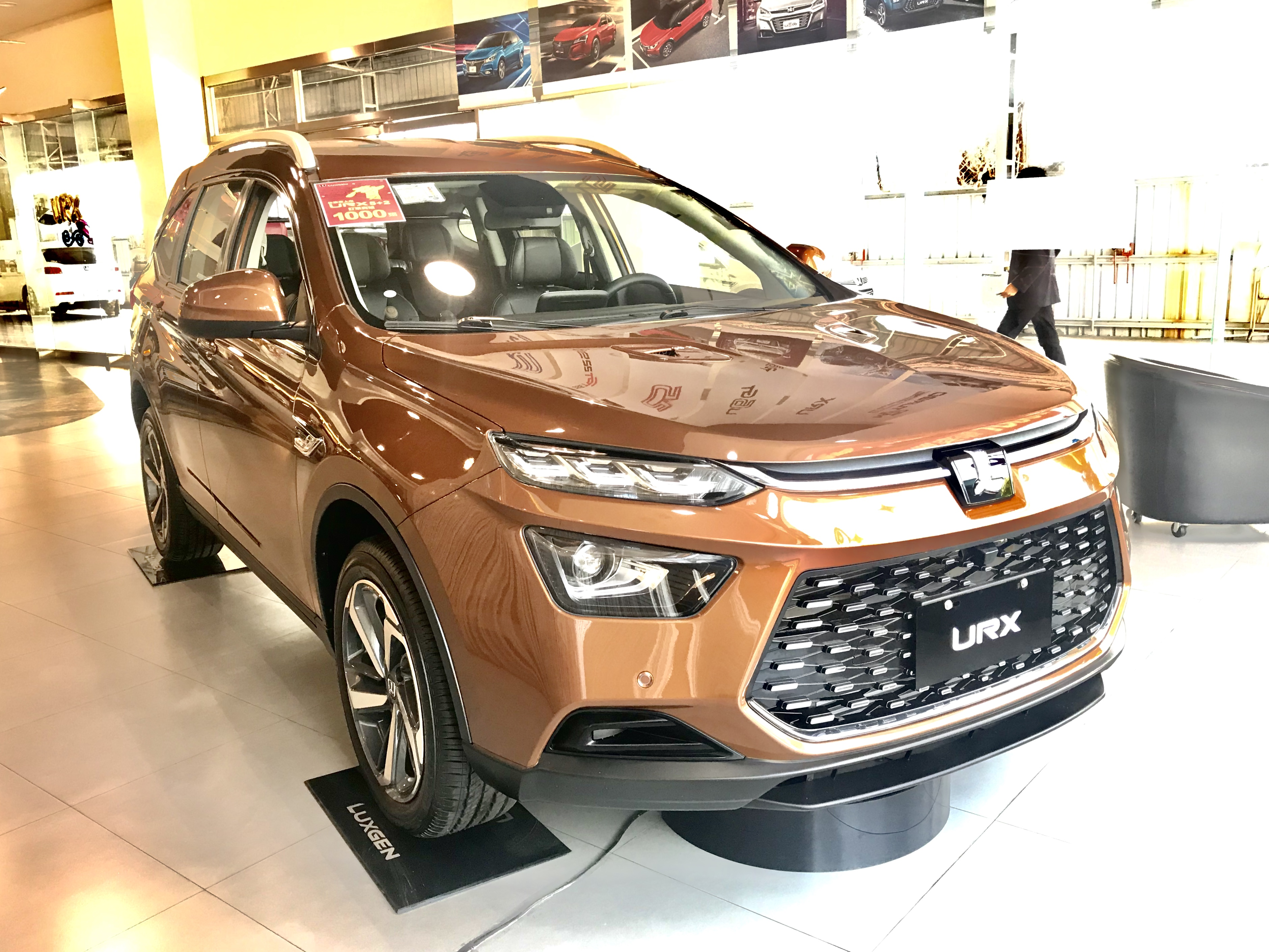
Luxgen URX

As part of Luxgen global expansion, the first overseas sale was made in Oman in 2010, with a plan to focus on the Middle East, Latin America, Central America and South America, Russia, mainland China and Southeast Asia car markets.

== Europe ==
In Europe where car sales had also drastically decreased, consideration was being given to financial support for the automotive industry, particularly in France, Germany and Italy. German Foreign Minister Frank-Walter Steinmeier and Jean-Claude Juncker, Luxembourg's Prime Minister and head of the Eurogroup of single currency nations, discussed the possibility of a common rescue package to be agreed by all the EU member states.

After 6 years of decline, in February 2014 car registration for a year increased to 894,730 vehicles and for subsequent 6 months the sales increased as expected with the price cuts and economic revival.

=== France ===
On November 20, 2008, French automobile manufacturer PSA Peugeot Citroen predicted sales volumes would fall by at least 10% in 2009, following a 17% drop in the current quarter. As a result, it planned to cut 2,700 jobs. On 11 February 2009, PSA announced it would cut 11,000 jobs worldwide. However, none of these are expected to be in France.

Renault announced a net profit for 2008 of 599 million euros for the 2008 financial year. This was a 78% drop in profits from the 2007 financial year. European sales fell 4% and worldwide sales 7%, forcing Renault to abandon their 2009 growth targets. This however made Renault one of the few car makers to return a profit. Renault consistently struggled to return profits in the 1990s.

=== France/Germany ===
On November 24, 2008, French President Nicolas Sarkozy and German Chancellor Angela Merkel agreed to support the crisis-stricken automobile industry in France and Germany.

=== Italy ===
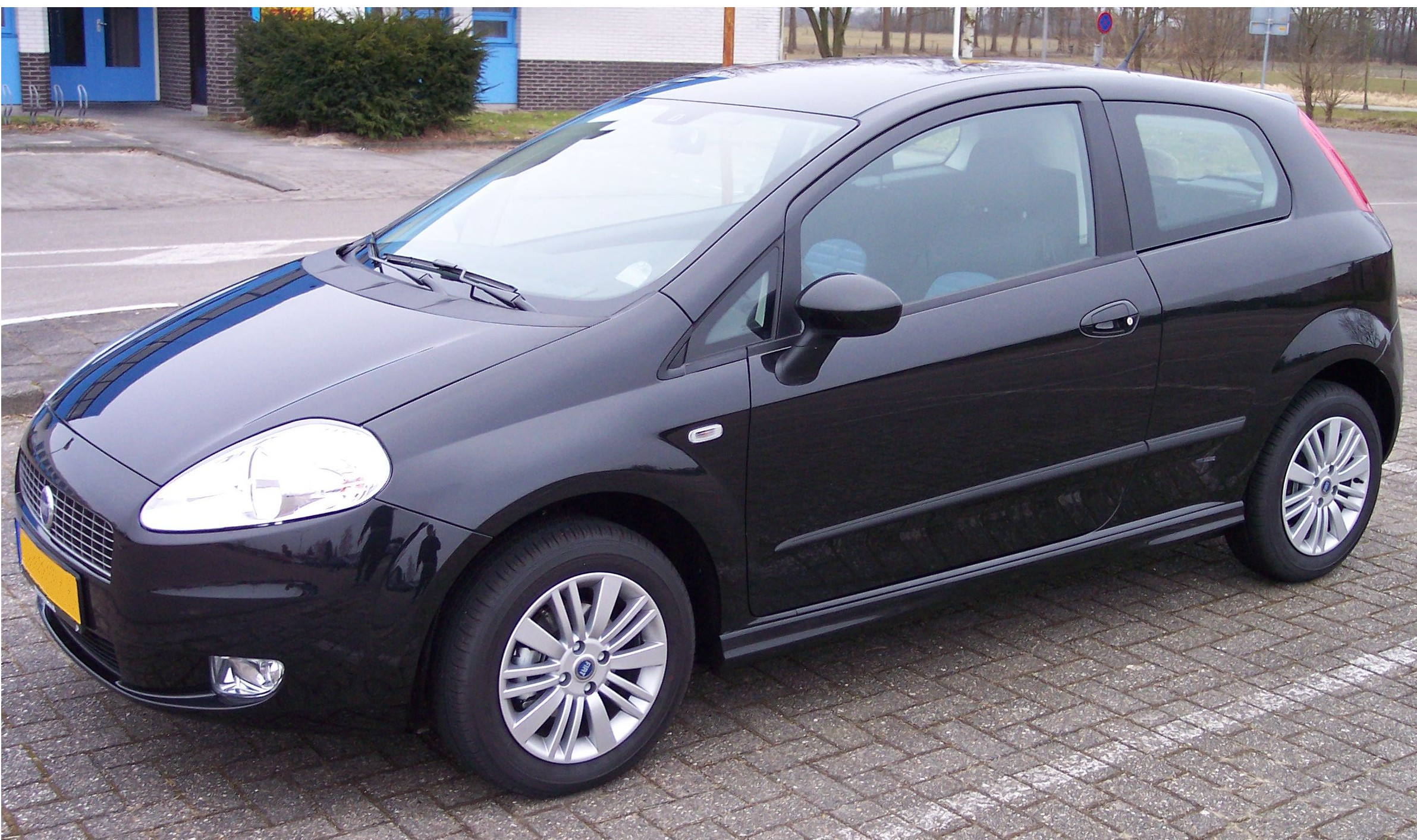
Fiat and Chrysler hoped smaller models like the Fiat Grande Punto could be successful in the U.S. market.

On December 16, 2008 Fiat in Italy announced that it will extend its temporary plant closures in Italy by a month; the Pomigliano d'Arco, the main plant for its Alfa Romeo cars will be shut for four weeks. However, on February 20, 2009, reacting to actions by the Italian government to stimulate the automotive sector, Fiat said its plant closures would be curtailed. The company also forecast that sales in Europe will drop by 14 percent in 2009.

On January 20, 2009 the company announced that it had entered into an agreement, subject to regulatory approvals, to acquire 35% of Chrysler. Fiat's 35% stake in Chrysler would not involve a conventional sale of shares, but would be achieved in return for allowing Chrysler to utilise some of Fiat's fuel efficient technologies (Chrysler's February submission to the U.S. government included a commitment to produce nine Fiat-derived vehicles over a four-year period starting in 2010, including four hybrid-electric and battery-electric models). Chrysler would be accorded access to Fiat's sales outlets in Europe, while in reciprocation Fiat will also gain access to Chrysler's dealership network in the U.S., where it is predicted smaller models such as the Fiat Grande Punto may be successful. In the past, Fiat has had trouble gaining a foothold in the American markets, whilst Chrysler has never held a strong market share in Europe since it sold its UK based Rootes Group and France based Simca to PSA Peugeot Citroen in the 1980s.

On January 22, 2009, Fiat announced a 19% drop in revenues in the last three months of 2008. Italian Prime Minister Silvio Berlusconi said the government would meet to discuss the issue.

=== Russia ===
Statistics of new car sales in Russia from 1999 to 2023, showing a sharp decrease in 2009 with a recovery by 2012

Russia's automotive industry was hit hard by the Late 2000s recession, which started from United States. Production of passenger cars dropped from 1,470,000 units in 2008 to just 597,000 units in 2009. Lorry production fell from 256,000 to 91,000 in the same period.

In late 2008, the Russian government introduced protectionistic measures, worth $5 billion, to improve the situation in the industry. This included $2 billion's worth of bailouts for troubled companies and $3 billion credits to buyers of Russian cars. Prime minister Vladimir Putin described the move as vital in order to save jobs. The tariffs for imported foreign cars and trucks were increased to a minimum 50% and 100%, respectively. The tariffs are linked to engine size of the vehicle. The increased duties led to protests in Russian cities, most notably in Vladivostok, as the import of Japanese cars is an important sector of the city's economy.

The most efficient anti-crisis measure executed by the Russian government was the introduction of a car scrappage scheme in March 2010. Under the scheme, buyers of new cars can receive a subsidy which is 600,000 rubles ($20,000) at maximum. Sales of Russia's largest carmaker Avtovaz doubled in the second quarter of 2010 as a result, and the company returned to profit.

=== Spain ===
Spanish automobile manufacturer SEAT (a subsidiary of the Volkswagen Group) cut production at its Martorell plant by 5% on 7 October 2008, due to a fall in general sales. This affected 750 employees and continued until July 2009. SEAT is still continuing to install solar panels on its Martorell plant near Barcelona.

=== Sweden ===
On December 11, 2008, the Swedish government provided its troubled auto makers, Volvo and Saab, with support amounting to SEK 28 billion (3.5 billion USD). The two companies had requested assistance, faced with the financial difficulties of their U.S. owners Ford and General Motors. The plan consists of a maximum of SEK 20 billion in credit guarantees, and up to SEK 5 billion in rescue loans. On 18 February 2009 General Motors warned Saab may fail within ten days, should the Swedish government not intervene. On 20 February, an administrator was appointed to restructure Saab and assist in it becoming independent of its troubled parent General Motors. General Motors have confirmed their intention to sell their Swedish subsidiary, Saab. Of Sweden's 9 million population, 140,000 work in the car industry and they account for 15% of exports.

=== United Kingdom ===
In the United Kingdom, Jaguar Land Rover, now owned by Tata Motors, was seeking a $1.5 billion loan from the government to cope with the credit crisis.

On 22 December 2008, Tata declared that it would inject "tens of millions" of pounds into the company it had acquired from Ford Motor Corporation in early 2008. British Prime Minister Gordon Brown also stated the intention to help out car industry in U.K.

On 8 January 2009, Nissan UK announced it was to shed 1200 jobs from its Washington, Tyne and Wear factory in North East England. This announcement was made, despite the plant recently being hailed as the most efficient in Europe.

General Motors UK subsidiary Vauxhall Motors, whose brand is the second most popular in the UK has two bases in the UK, a factory in Ellesmere Port, Cheshire and their headquarters and design and development centre in Luton, Bedfordshire. It is as yet unknown whether these plants will be affected by the GM cutbacks. The group along with their sister subsidiary, Opel of Germany, was supposed to be sold in their majority to Magna International, an Austro-Canadian company who supply many parts to large car companies, but General Motors cancelled the transaction.

UK bus manufacturer Optare received an order from Arriva in November 2008 for the manufacture of 53 buses in a contract worth over £6million, securing 500 jobs at the company's Assembly factory in Cross Gates, Leeds, West Yorkshire and the parts centre in Cumbernauld, North Lanarkshire.

UK Van and commercial vehicle manufacturer LDV Group asked the UK government for a £30 million bridging loan to facilitate a management buyout of the group. On the same day this was refused. LDV has since said it has a viable future and intends to become the first volume producer of electric vans should the management buyout take place. Production at LDV's factory in Birmingham, West Midlands (where it employed 850 staff) has been suspended since December 2008 due to falling demand. Eventually, no buyout materialised and LDV was declared defunct on 15 October 2009.

Along with several other countries, the UK government launched a scrappage incentive scheme in order to support the crisis stricken industry. Cars registered prior to 31 July 1999, later extended to 29 February 2000, were eligible to be scrap in exchange for a discount of £2000 on a new car, half of which was provided by the government and the other half by the dealer. The scheme came to an end on 31 March 2010.

== North America ==
=== Canada ===
The Canadian auto industry was closely linked to the U.S., due to the Automotive Products Trade Agreement and, later, the North American Free Trade Agreement (NAFTA), and experienced similar difficulties.

=== United States ===
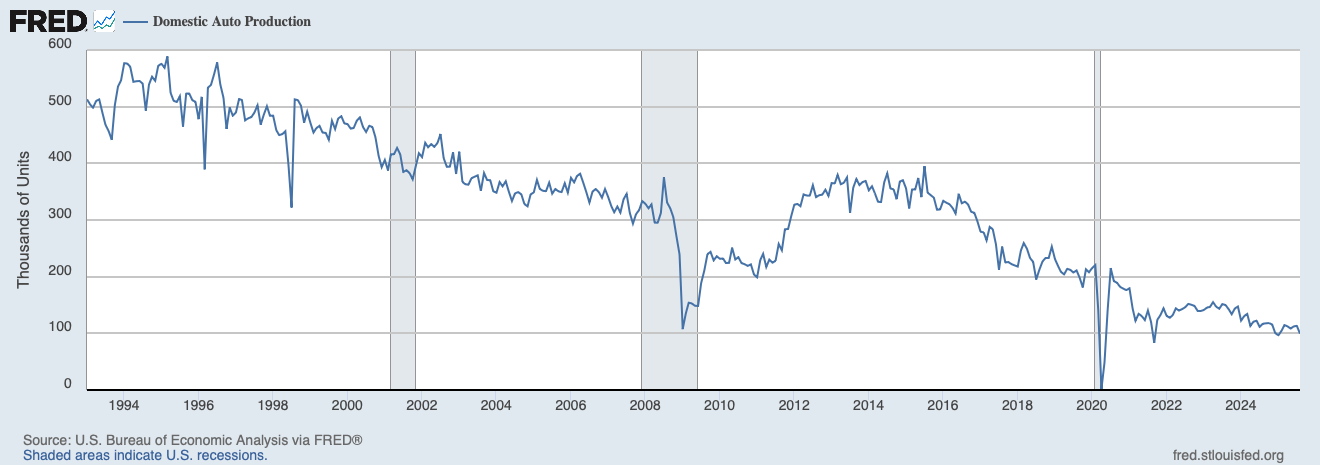
US automobile manufacturing, 1993–2025

The crisis in the United States is mainly defined by the government rescue of both General Motors and Chrysler. Ford secured a line of credit in case they require a bridging loan in the near future. Car sales declined in the United States, affecting both US based and foreign car manufacturers. The bridging loans led to greater scrutiny of the U.S. automotive industry in addition to criticism of their product range, product quality, high labour wages, job bank programs. The government-backed rescue of the American auto industry gained the support of 37% of Americans in 2009 according to a CNN/Opinion Research Corporation poll, and it gained the support of 56% of Americans in 2012 according to a Pew Research Center poll. Chrysler was forced into bankruptcy in April 2009 and GM in May.

While the "Big Three" U.S. market share declined from 70% in 1998 to 53% in 2008, global volume increased particularly in Asia and Europe. The U.S. auto industry was profitable in every year since 1955, except those years following U.S. recessions and involvement in wars. U.S. auto industry profits suffered from 1971 to 1973 during the Vietnam War, during the recession in the late 1970s which impacted auto industry profits from 1981 to 1983, during and after the Gulf War when industry profits declined from 1991 to 1993, and during the Iraq War from 2001 to 2003 and 2006–09. During these periods the companies incurred much legacy debt.

Facing financial losses, the Big Three have idled many factories and drastically reduced employment levels. GM spun off many of its employees in certain divisions into independent companies, including American Axle in 1994 and Delphi in 1999. Ford spun off Visteon in 2000. The spin-offs and other parts makers have shared Detroit's downturns, as have the U.S.-owned plants in Canada. Altogether the parts makers employ 416,000 people in the U.S. and Canada. General Motors alone is estimated to have lost $51 billion in the three years before the start of the 2008 financial crisis. GM is set to reacquire factories from its Delphi subsidiary during its Chapter 11 restructuring.

The 2005 Harbour Report estimated that Toyota's lead in benefits cost advantage amounted to $350 US to $500 US per vehicle over North American manufacturers. The United Auto Workers agreed to a two-tier wage in recent 2007 negotiations, something which the Canadian Auto Workers has so far refused. Jared Bernstein, the chief economist of Vice President Joe Biden, noted in an interview with WWJ-AM in Detroit that most of the 2007 contract concessions apply only to new hires, while older workers "still benefit from contracts that were signed a long time ago." However, only 30% of parts used by the Big Three employ union labor, with 70% sourced from non-union labor.

Delphi, which was spun off from GM in 1999, filed for Chapter 11 bankruptcy after the UAW refused to cut their wages and GM is expected to be liable for a $7 billion shortfall.

In order to improve profits, the Detroit automakers made agreements with unions to reduce wages while making pension and health care commitments. GM, for instance, at one time picked up the entire cost of funding health insurance premiums of its employees, their survivors and GM retirees, as the U.S. did not have a universal health care system. With most of these plans chronically underfunded in the late 1990s, the companies have tried to provide retirement packages to older workers, and made agreements with the UAW to transfer pension obligations to an independent trust. Nonetheless, non-unionized Japanese automakers, with their younger American workforces (and far fewer American retirees) will continue to enjoy a cost advantage.

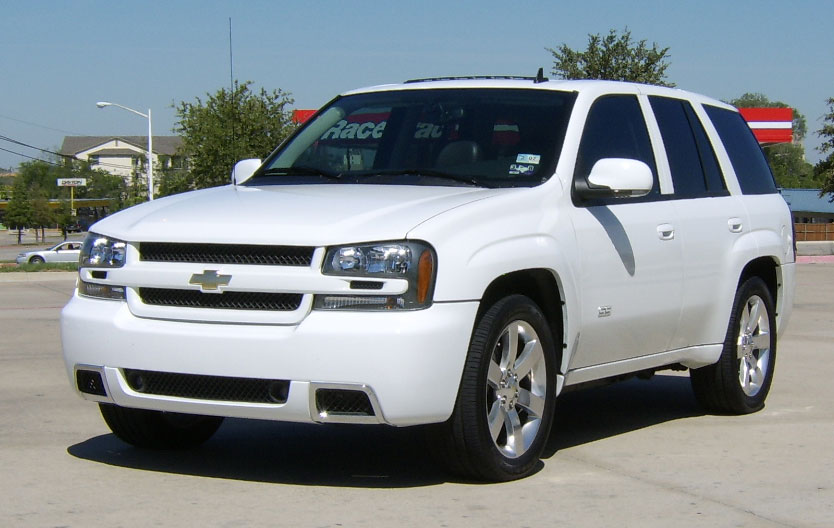
A Chevrolet TrailBlazer, one of General Motors' SUVs

Despite the history of their marques, many long running cars have been discontinued or relegated to fleet sales, as GM, Ford and DaimlerChrysler shifted away resources from midsize and compact cars to lead the "SUV Craze". Since the late 1990s, over half of their profits have come from light trucks and SUVs, while they often could not break even on compact cars unless the buyer chose options. Ron Harbour, in releasing the Oliver Wyman's 2008 Harbour Report, stated that many small "econoboxes" of the past acted as loss leaders, but were designed to bring customers to the brand in the hopes they would stay loyal and move up to more profitable models. The report estimated that an automaker needed to sell ten small cars to make the same profit as one big vehicle, and that they had to produce small and mid-size cars profitably to succeed, something that the Detroit three have not yet done. SUV sales peaked in 1999 but have not returned to that level ever since, due to higher gas prices.

In the case of Chrysler Corporation, compact and mid-sized vehicles such as the Dodge Neon, Dodge Stratus and Chrysler Cirrus were produced profitably during the 1990s concurrently with more profitable larger vehicles. However, following the DaimlerChrysler merger in 1998, there was a major cost-cutting operation at the company. The result was the lowering of benchmarked standards for Chrysler to aim at. This directly led to the following in Chrysler's case. There was realignment of the Chrysler Group model range with those of GM and Ford (i.e. a skew towards larger vehicles).

The Detroit Big Three had been slower to bring new vehicles to the market compared with foreign competitors. The Big Three have battled initial quality perceptions in spite of reports showing improvements.

Falling sales resulted in the Big Three's plants operating below capacity. GM's plants were operating at 85% in November 2005, well below the plants of its Asian competitors, and was only maintained by relying on cash incentives and subsidized leases. Rebates, employee pricing, and 0% financing boosted sales but drained the automaker's cash reserves. The subprime mortgage crisis and high oil prices of 2008 caused the popularity of once best-selling trucks and SUVs to plummet. Automakers were forced to continue offering heavy incentives to help clear excess inventory. Due to the declining residual value of their vehicles, Chrysler and GM stopped offering leases on most of their vehicles in 2008.

In September 2008, the Big Three asked for $50 billion to pay for health care expenses and avoid bankruptcy and ensuing layoffs, and Congress worked out a $25 billion loan. By December, President Bush had agreed to an emergency bailout of $17.4 billion to be distributed by the next administration in January and February. In early 2009, the prospect of avoiding bankruptcy by General Motors and Chrysler continued to wane as new financial information about the scale of the 2008 losses came in. Ultimately, poor management and business practices forced Chrysler and General Motors into bankruptcy. Chrysler filed for chapter 11 bankruptcy protection on May 1, 2009 followed by General Motors a month later.

On June 2, General Motors announced the sale of the Hummer brand of off-road vehicles to Sichuan Tengzhong Heavy Industrial Machinery Company Ltd., a machinery company in western China, a deal which later fell through. Later, GM announced that it was ending production of its Hummer, Saturn and Pontiac lines effective at the end of the 2009 model year.

==== Effects of environmental expectations and changing product demand ====
Environmental politics and related concerns regarding carbon emissions have heightened sensitivity to gas mileage standards and environmental protection worldwide. In a 2007 edition of his book An Inconvenient Truth, Al Gore criticized the Big Three. "They keep trying to sell large, inefficient gas-guzzlers even though fewer and fewer people are buying them." For example, Japan requires autos to achieve 45 miles per US gallon (5.2 L/100 km; 54 mpg_{‑imp}) of gasoline and China requires 35 mpg_{‑US} (6.7 L/100 km; 42 mpg_{‑imp}). The European Union requires 47 mpg_{‑US} (5.0 L/100 km; 56 mpg_{‑imp}) by 2012. By comparison, U.S. autos are required to achieve only 25 mpg_{‑US} (9.4 L/100 km; 30 mpg_{‑imp}) presently. Other nations have adopted standards that are increasing mpg requirements in the future. When California raised its own standards, the auto companies sued.

The Big Three received funding for a $25 billion government loan during October 2008 to help them re-tool their factories to meet new fuel-efficiency standards of at least 35 mpg_{‑US} (6.7 L/100 km; 42 mpg_{‑imp}) by 2020. The $25 billion in loans from the Department of Energy to the auto manufacturers were actually authorized by Congress early this year but not funded. Automakers could use these loans to "equip or establish facilities to produce ‘advanced technology vehicles’ that would meet certain emissions and fuel economy standards; component suppliers could borrow funds to retool or build facilities to produce parts for such vehicles."

==== Effect of 2008 oil price shock and economic crisis ====
Medium term crude oil prices 1987–2016

In 2008, a series of damaging blows drove the Big Three to the verge of bankruptcy. The Big Three had in recent years manufactured SUVs and large pickups, which were much more profitable than smaller, fuel-efficient cars. Manufacturers made 15% to 20% profit margin on an SUV, compared to 3% or less on a car. When gasoline prices rose above $4 per gallon in 2008, Americans stopped buying the big vehicles and Big Three sales and profitability plummeted.

The 2008 financial crisis played a role, as GM was unable to obtain credit to buy Chrysler. Sales fell further as consumer credit tightened and it became much harder for people with average or poor credit to obtain a bank loan to buy a car. During 2007, nearly 2 million new U.S. cars were purchased with funds from home equity loans. Such funding was considerably less available in 2008. In addition, stock prices fell as shareholders worried about bankruptcy; GM's shares fell below 1946 levels. Furthermore, the instability of the job market and individual consumers' finances discourages consumers who already have a working vehicle from taking on a new loan and payments, which affected almost all major manufacturers.

The annual capacity of the industry is 17 million cars; sales in 2008 dropped to an annual rate of only 10 million vehicles made in the U.S. and Canada. All the automakers and their vast supplier network account for 2.3% of the U.S. economic output, down from 3.1% in 2006 and as much as 5% in the 1990s. Some 20% of the entire national manufacturing sector is still tied to the automobile industry. The transplants can make a profit when sales are at least 12 million; the Big Three when sales are at least 15 million.

By December 19, 2008, oil prices had fallen to $33.87 per barrel, but the automobile crisis continued.

== See also ==
- Automotive industry
- Corporate welfare
- Lemon socialism
- Presidential Task Force on the Auto Industry
- Too big to fail
- Effects of the 2008–2010 automotive industry crisis on the United States
- Effects of the 2008–2010 automotive industry crisis on Canada
