= Comau =

Italian multinational company

Comau S.p.A.
- Type: Subsidiary
- Industry: Automation
- Founded: 1973; 53 years ago
- Headquarters: Turin, Italy
- Number of locations: 20 plants, facilities and establishments
- Key people: Alessandro Nasi (chairman); Pietro Gorlier (CEO)
- Products: Industrial automation products, systems and services
- Number of employees: 4,000 (2022)
- Parent: One Equity Partners; Stellantis
- Website: www.comau.com

Comau S.p.A. (Consorzio Macchine Utensili) is an Italian multinational company in the automation field based in Turin, Italy. It is a part of the automaker Stellantis. The company is present in 13 countries and employs 4,000 people.

Comau provides services, products and technologies for the automotive, shipping, logistics, food beverage, packaging, electrification, renewable energy and heavy industry industries.

== History ==
=== Foundation ===
Comau was established in 1973 as the COnsorzio MAcchine Utensili. It was formed by the same Torino-based engineers and companies that helped build the Soviet landmark VAZ (Lada) Plant in Togliatti, Russia. In 1977 the company was renamed Comau Finanziaria S.p.A.

=== Growth and expansion ===
In 1984, Comau Productivity Systems Inc. was formed.

It started the development of commercial and industrial activities in North America. Comau Finanziaria S.p.A. gained a majority interest in Italtech S.p.A.

The following year, it acquired Berto Lamet, a sheet metal die producer, and U.T.S., which specialized in product and process engineering. Berto Lamet then took over TEA, an injection molding manufacturer, and, in 1990, it took over the Spanish company, Mecaner S.A., which specialized in producing sheet metal dies.

In 1995, the company grew throughout South America, Europe, North America, and Asia. Comau do Brasil Ind e Com. Ltda and Comau Argentina S.A. were launched with all Comau Business Units joining the Mercosur market. In Germany, Comau Deutschland GmbH was established. The following year, a French branch was formed. That year the company officially changed its name to Comau S.p.A.

In 1997, the company gained a majority interest in Geico S.p.A., a producer of painting systems within the automotive industry. Comau India Pvt. Ltd. in Pune was set up as the company's headquarters in Southeast Asia. Comau Poland Sp.z.o.o., a production plant for sheet metal dies, began operation in Tychy and, later that year, began offering maintenance services as well. In the same year, Comau Service was launched to provide full maintenance services to customers worldwide.

In 1999, Comau took over the French company Sciaky S.A., a producer of body systems and welding guns, which was renamed Comau Sciaky S.A. Also that year, Comau S.p.A. gained a majority interest in Renault Automation S.A. of France, a company specializing in engineering, metal cutting, mechanical assembly, and body final assembly. In the same year, Fiat S.p.A. acquired Progressive Tool and Industries Co. (PICO), a U.S. company experienced in body systems manufacturing, and it was subsequently renamed Comau PICO. In the UK, the Pico Estil in Luton became Comau Estil; in South Africa, Aims in Uitenhage was renamed Comau South Africa Pty. Ltd.

In 2000, Comau (Shanghai) Automotive Equipment Co. Ltd. was opened in Kangqiao (Pudong) by Michele Straniero supported by the group CEO Dr. Piero Maritano, Comau Belgium N.V. was established to develop maintenance services in Northern Europe and Comau Systems Services S.L. began operations in Madrid.

The next year, Comau S.p.A. acquired two companies in automotive product and process engineering and industrialization, Germann-Intec GmbH and Team Resources Romania, which became Comau România S.A. Comau Australia opens in Adelaide in 2001.

In 2002, Comau Ingest Sverige AB was established in Sweden; in 2003, Comau Russia Srl and Comau (Shanghai) International Trading Co. Ltd. began operations with a focus on import-export activities. Comau Sciaky SA became the full owner of Gerbi & Sciaky, a company in France that produces electrical welding guns, changing its name to Sciaky S.A.S. in 2004. The next year, Comau Service France and Comau Sciaky and Sciaky S.A.S. were consolidated within Comau France S.A. In 2005, Comau Germann-Intec GmbH merged with Comau Deutschland GmbH.

In 2007, Comau-Germann Intec GmbH was started in Germany with a focus on engineering activities. In 2013, Comau expanded its presence in China with three new sites. Comau Turkey and Comau Czech were also opened to better serve the Middle and Eastern European markets. Soon after, Comau established a new office in Munich, Germany, which expanded into Mexico.

Comau São Paulo and Comau Thailand were established in 2015, while in 2016, Comau opened its HUMANufacturing Innovation Center in Pontedera (Pisa), Italy. The company also opens a new location in California, United States, in 2016. Comau expands its activities in the United Kingdom in 2017, by opening a new engineering facility in North East England.

In these years the Comau Academy was founded, with which the company began to organize master, technical and managerial training courses, and then with the educational platform e.DO™ Experience, Comau began to offer educational activities for learning STEM subjects, robotics, coding, and soft skills based on the use of educational and open source robots and.DO™.

In 2020 Comau signed the technological collaboration agreement with TIM for the digital transformation of the manufacturing industries and collaborated with FCA and the Fiat brand in the production of the new electrical Fiat 500, supported SME manufacturing companies at the MADE competence center in Milan, cooperated with the Artes 4.0 in Pisa, collaborated with the CIM 4.0 in Turin and joined the Innovation Community EIT Manufacturing.

In 2021 the company joined the European Battery Alliance (EBA) and the Batteries European Partnership Association (BEPA). There it contributed to the European Technology & Innovation Platform (Etip) for batteries and collaborated with the UK Battery Industrialisation Center along with Rockwell Automation for the creation of unified robot control solutions and additional support of the Fincantieri and llika plc. to develop prototypes of robotized steel welding solutions.

In 2022 Comau assisted to expand the manufacturing lines in the Brazilian state of Pernambuco to produce the new 7-seat Jeep Commander SUV. This helped to increase process optimization and control, and at the same time supported Ilika plc. in a study for an All-Solid-State Battery Technology.

In June 2020 Alessandro Nasi was selected as the chairman of Comau, alongside Paolo Carmassi as CEO.

In April 2022 Comau announced the appointment of Pietro Gorlier as the new CEO.

== Products, technologies and services ==
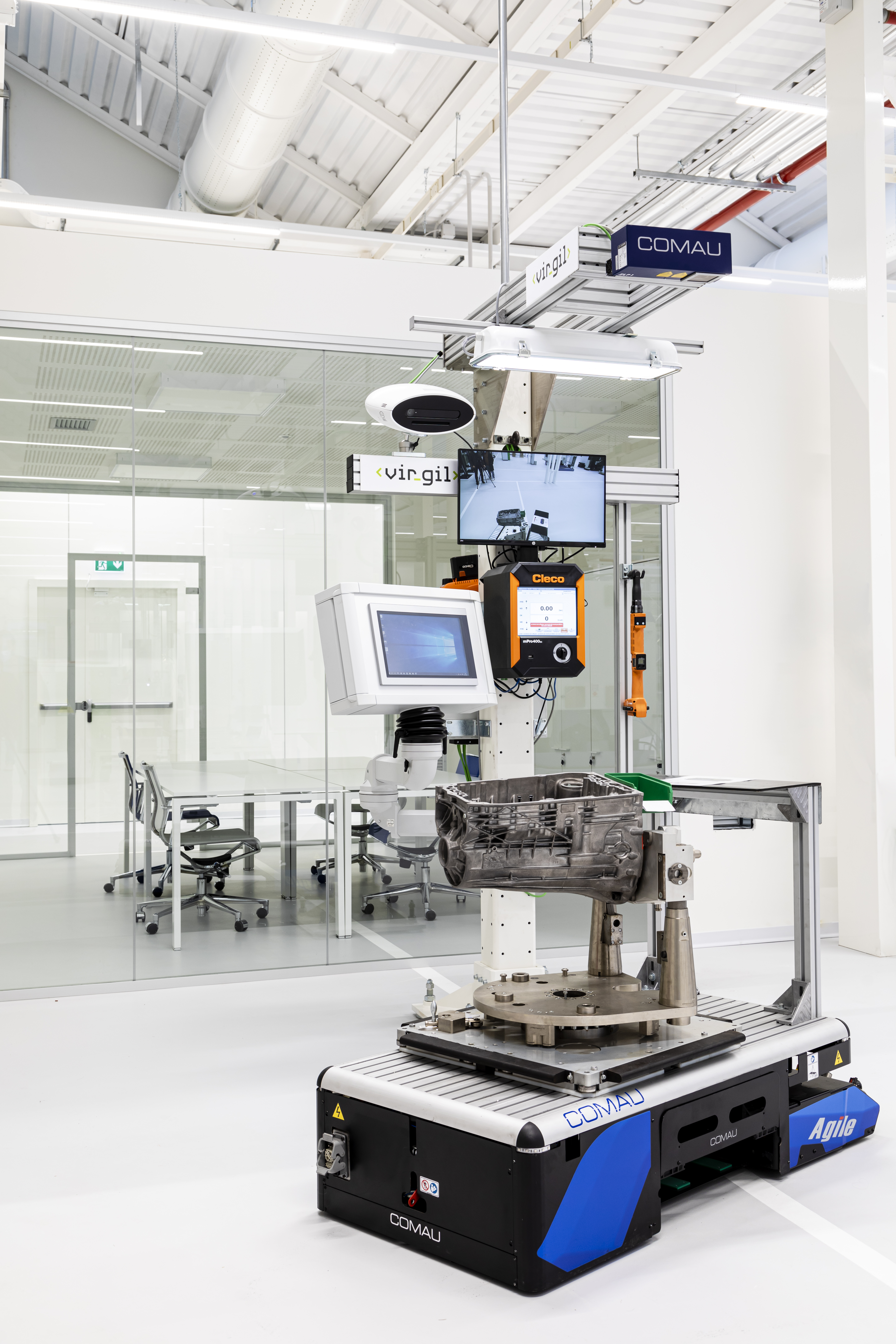
AGILE 1500 Comau Robot at MADE Competence Centre in Milan.

=== Body assembly ===
Production of:

- assembly and welding systems for car bodies, frames and components;
- junction technologies (e.g. laser and plasma cutting, welding clamps, point welding machines, brazing applications).

=== Powertrain and machining ===
Analysis, development, industrialization, design, and supply of technologies for mechanical processing in manufacturing sectors:

- integrated universal machining centers IoT (Industrial Internet of Things);
- flexible systems;
- production lines;
- crankshaft machines;
- thermal spray coating.

Technologies for the automotive and transport sector.

=== Robotics and automation products ===
In 1979 the company built the first robotic assembly line, which was supplied to the Fiat plant in Mirafiori for the production of the famous car model FIAT 131.

In the late '70s and early '80s, Comau started to produce the first industrial robots and launched the Robogate system in the European and world markets - an assembly system designed to carry out multiple operations at the same time with the joint use of several robots.

In the second half of the 80s, as a massive development of laser technology begins, Comau started to design laser robots.

In the following years, robots and automation products were developed:

- anthropomorphic robots for different industrial applications (SCARA robotics arms, robots for special processing, hollow wrist);
- collaborative robots to work in close contact with humans (Racer-5-0.80 COBOT, AURA,);
- exoskeleton to support the upper limbs of operators to facilitate their work and reduce physical fatigue (MATE-XT);
- Automatic Guided Vehicle (AGV) to manage logistics more easily within the factory (Agile 1500);
- educational robots designed to facilitate the learning and teaching of STEM subjects, robotics, coding and enhancing soft skills (e.DO);
- factory automation products 4.0 (Lhyte, the hybrid laser system that combines fiber and diode laser sources, a wide range of welding pliers, and the Spot Welding Machine, a special robot integrated with a point welding clamp).

=== Electrification ===
Comau also specializes in the development of products and automation processes for electrification, such as, mechanical machining centers, assembly systems, digital products for Industry 4.0 and integrated logistics services: production and assembly of rechargeable modules and batteries, and electric motors. Comau initiated the Flexible Battery Dismantling (Flex-BD) project to automate all battery dismantling operations.

=== Other services ===
Comau also specializes in the services of concept development, plant design, improvement of production processes, project management and system integration services

== Presence ==
Comau's headquarters are in Turin, Italy, and the company is present in 14 countries around Europe, Asia, South America, and North America—with 7 innovation centres, 5 digital hubs, and 8 production plants, where over 9.000 people work.

== Corporate structure ==
As part of Stellantis, Comau is managed by a board of directors and a board of statutory auditors. The board of directors oversees the company's performance both directly and through committees charged with specific advisory functions. It is supported by a body made up of members.

=== Key people ===
- Alessandro Nasi, Chairman—In 2005 he joined the Fiat Group, following professional experiences in the banking and finance sector. He held senior roles at Fiat Powertrain Technologies and CNH Industrial, a company that produces machinery for agriculture and construction. Currently he is member of the Board of Directors of CNH Industrial, Chairman of Iveco Defence Vehicles and member of the Lego Group's advisory board. Nasi is also vice-chairman of the Board of EXOR.
- Pietro Gorlier, CEO. He was Chief Parts and Services Officer worldwide at Stellantis, President and CEO of MOPAR, CEO of Magneti Marelli, COO of the Region EMEA at FCA and since 2011 he has been a member of the FCA Group Executive Council (GEC).
