= Teksid =

Italian metal castings company

Teksid S.p.A.
- Type: Subsidiary
- Founded: December 1978
- Headquarters: Carmagnola, Italy
- Key people: Virgilio CERUTTI (Chief Executive Officer)
- Products: Iron, aluminum and magnesium castings for the automotive industry
- Number of employees: 3,500
- Parent: Stellantis
- Website: www.teksid.com

Teksid S.p.A. is an Italian company based in Carmagnola specialized in the production of iron, aluminum and magnesium castings for the automotive industry. Originally known as Ferriere Piemontesi, today Teksid is 100% owned by Stellantis, and was owned by its predecessors Fiat Chrysler Automobiles (2014-2020) and Fiat S.p.A. (1978-2014). The company was renamed Teksid in January 1978.

In 1998, the French car manufacturer Renault merged its foundry business with Teksid, creating a change of ownership with a share 66.5%/33.5% to Fiat and Renault respectively. By 2013 Fiat grew its share to 84.8% and Renault retains 15.2%.

The company owns five plants (three in Europe, and one each in South America and China), and employs 3,500 persons. Teksid produces engine blocks, cylinder heads, engine components, transmission parts, gearboxes and suspensions.

Teksid's products are used by various Stellantis companies, and also sold to third-party companies.

== Joint ventures ==
In China, Teksid has a 50% ownership of Hua Dong Teksid Automotive Foundry Co. Ltd.
