= Fiat S.p.A. =

Italian holding company

Coordinates: 45°01′57″N 7°40′01″E

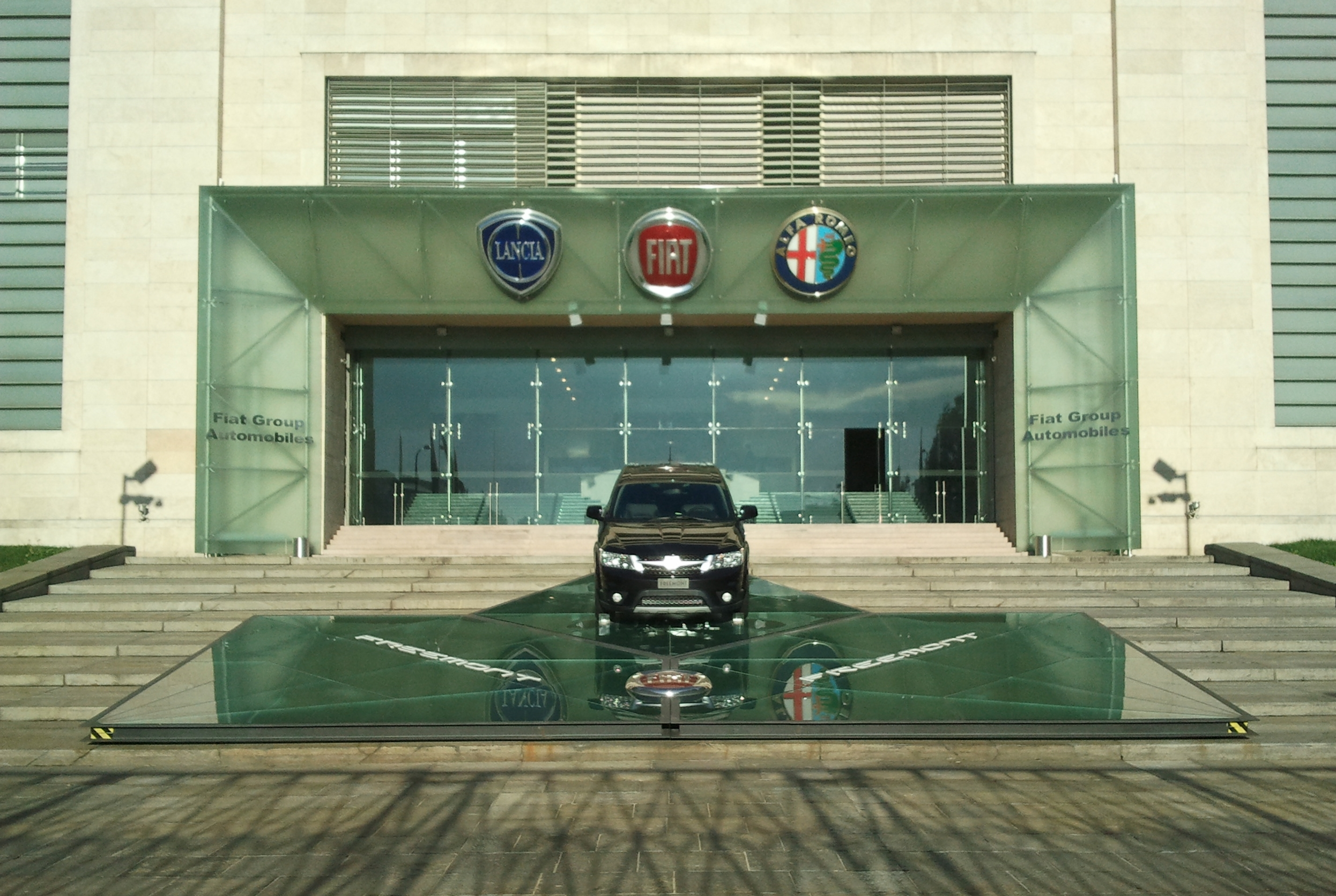
- Fiat Mirafiori in Turin, Italy.
- Type: Public
- Traded as: BIT: F
- ISIN: IT0001976403
- Industry: Automotive
- Founded: July 11, 1899; 127 years ago
- Founder: Giovanni Agnelli
- Defunct: October 12, 2014
- Fate: Merged with Chrysler Group into Fiat Chrysler Automobiles
- Successor: Fiat Chrysler Automobiles
- Headquarters: Turin, Italy
- Area served: Worldwide
- Key people: Gianni Agnelli (founder); John Elkann (chairman); Sergio Marchionne (CEO)
- Products: Automobiles; commercial vehicles; Auto parts
- Production output: 4.2 million units (mass market brands – new cars and LCVs)(2012)
- Revenue: ▲€83.957 billion (2012)
- Operating income: ▲€3.814 billion (2012)
- Total assets: ▲€82.119 billion (end 2012)
- Total equity: ▲€13.173 billion (end 2012)
- Owner: Exor (30.05%)
- Number of employees: 214,836 (end 2012)
- Parent: Exor
- Subsidiaries: Companies: Vehicles; Fiat Group Automobiles; Abarth; Alfa Romeo; Fiat; Fiat Professional; Fiat Powertrain Technologies; VM Motori; Lancia; Chrysler Group; Chrysler; Dodge; Jeep; Ram Trucks; Mopar; SRT; Ferrari (90%); Maserati Agriculture and industrial; CNH Industrial (83%); New Holland Agriculture; New Holland Construction; Iveco Components and production systems; Magneti Marelli; Automotive Lighting; Comau; Teksid (84.8%) Publishing and advertising; Itedi; La Stampa; Publikompass
- Website: www.fiatspa.com

Fiat S.p.A., commonly known as Fiat Group, was an Italian holding company whose original and core activities were in the automotive industry.

The Fiat Group contained many brands such as Fiat, Abarth, Ferrari, Maserati, Lancia and Alfa Romeo.

Fiat was founded in 1899 by a group of investors, including Giovanni Agnelli. During its more than century-long history, Fiat has also manufactured railway engines and carriages, military vehicles, farm tractors, and aircraft. In 2013, Fiat Group, together with Chrysler Group was the second largest European automaker by volumes produced, and the seventh in the world ahead of Honda, PSA Peugeot Citroën, Suzuki, Renault, and Daimler.

Over the years Fiat has acquired numerous other automakers: it acquired Lancia in 1968, became a shareholder of Ferrari in 1969, took control of Alfa Romeo from the Italian government in 1986, purchased Maserati in 1993, and became the full owner of Chrysler Group in 2014. Fiat Group currently produces vehicles under twelve brands: Abarth, Alfa Romeo, Chrysler, Dodge, Ferrari, Fiat, Fiat Professional, Jeep, Lancia, Maserati, Ram Trucks, and SRT.

In 1970 Fiat employed more than 100,000 in Italy when its production reached the highest number, 1.4 million cars, in that country. As of 2002, Fiat built more than 1 million vehicles at six plants in Italy and the country accounted for more than a third of the company's revenue.

Fiat-brand cars are built in several locations around the world. Outside Italy, the largest country of production is Brazil, where the Fiat brand is the market leader. The group also has factories in Argentina, Poland and Mexico (where Fiat-brand vehicles are manufactured at plants owned and operated by Chrysler for export to the U.S., Brazil, Italy and other markets) and a long history of licensing manufacture of its products in other countries – in the 1960s, Fiat notably set up joint ventures in Eastern Europe with the best known being VAZ (Lada) in the former Soviet Union. It also has numerous alliances and joint ventures around the world, the main ones being located in Serbia, France, Turkey, India and China.

Gianni Agnelli, the grandson of founder Giovanni Agnelli, was Fiat's chairman from 1966 until 1996; he then served as honorary chairman from 1996 until his death on 24 January 2003, during which time Cesare Romiti served as chairman. He was succeeded briefly by Paolo Fresco, who served as chairman, and Paolo Cantarella, as CEO. Umberto Agnelli then took over as chairman from 2003 to 2004. After Umberto Agnelli's death on 28 May 2004, Luca Cordero di Montezemolo was named chairman, with Agnelli heir John Elkann becoming vice chairman (at the age of 28), and other family members also serving on the board. On 1 June 2004, Giuseppe Morchio was replaced by Sergio Marchionne as CEO.

On 29 January 2014, it was announced that Fiat Group was to be merged with Chrysler Group into Fiat Chrysler Automobiles (FCA), taking place before the end of 2014. Fiat Chrysler Automobiles became the new owner of Fiat Group. On 1 August 2014, Fiat Group. received necessary shareholder approval to proceed with the merger (which followed board approval). The merger became effective 12 October 2014.

== History ==
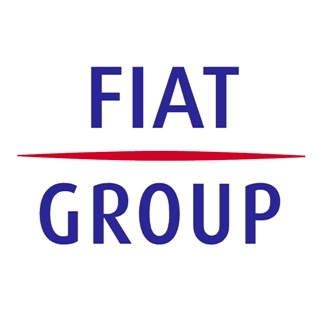
Former logo (2007-2011)

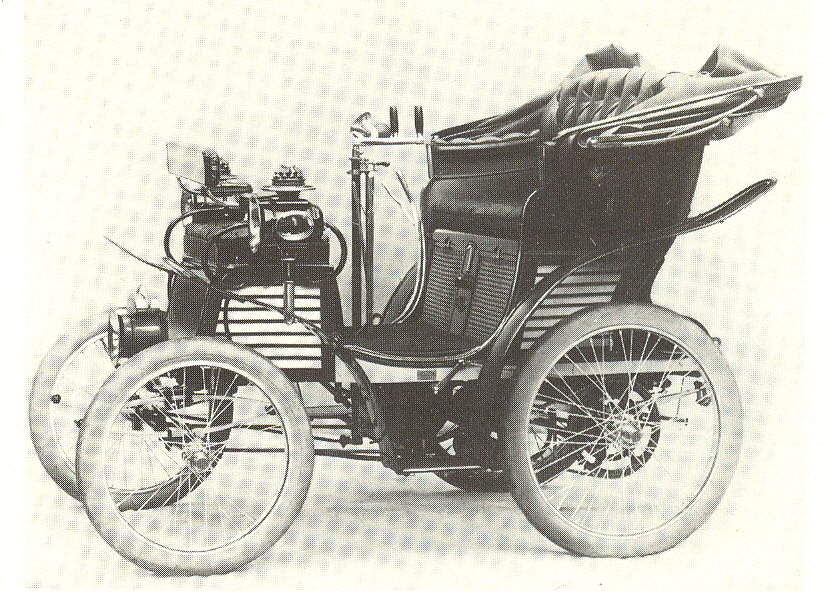
Fiat 3 ½ CV (1899)

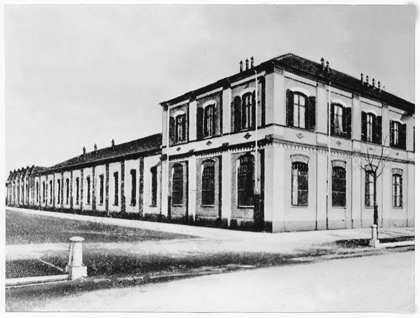
Corso Dante plant

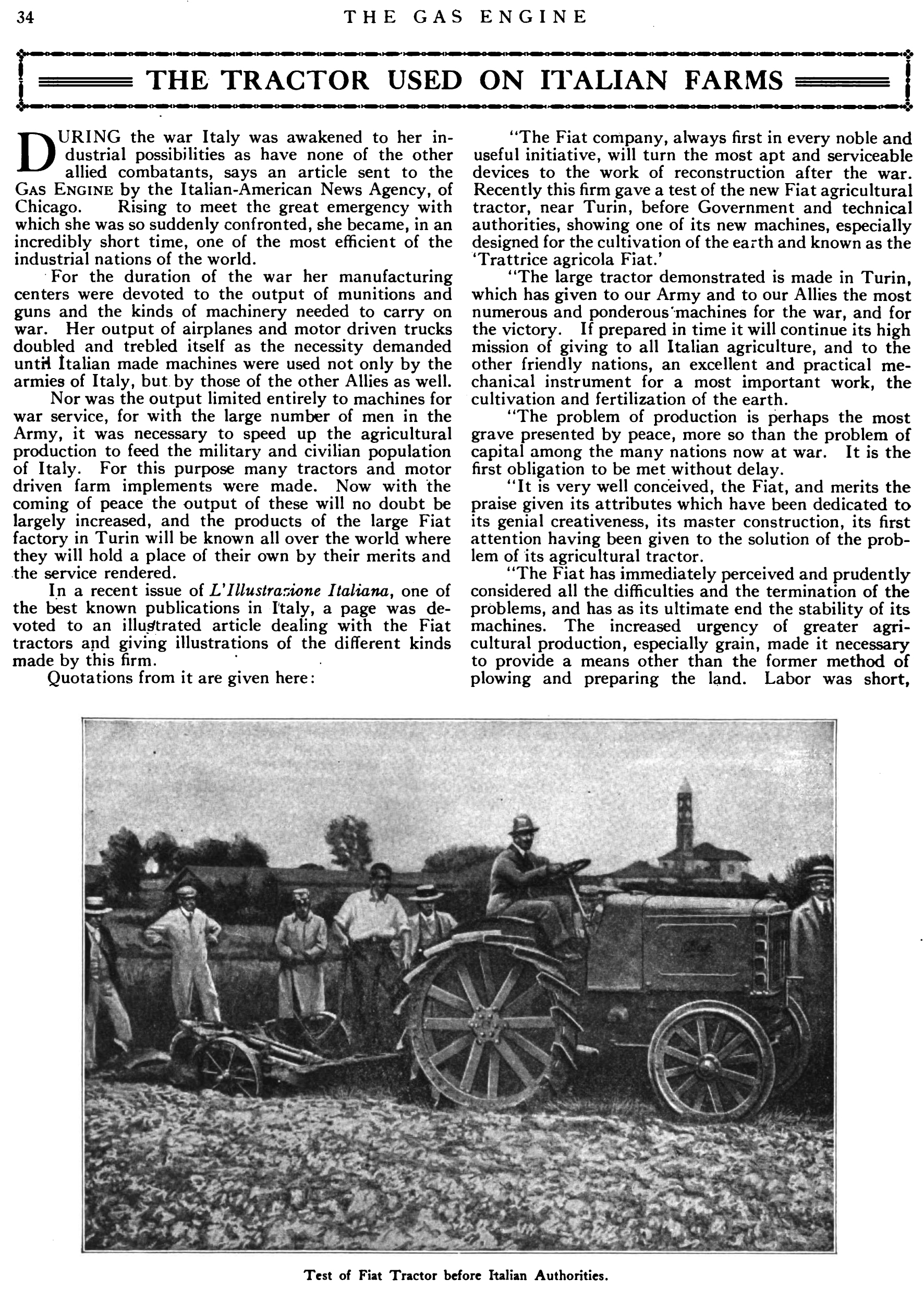
Fiat tractor in a 1919 American magazine article

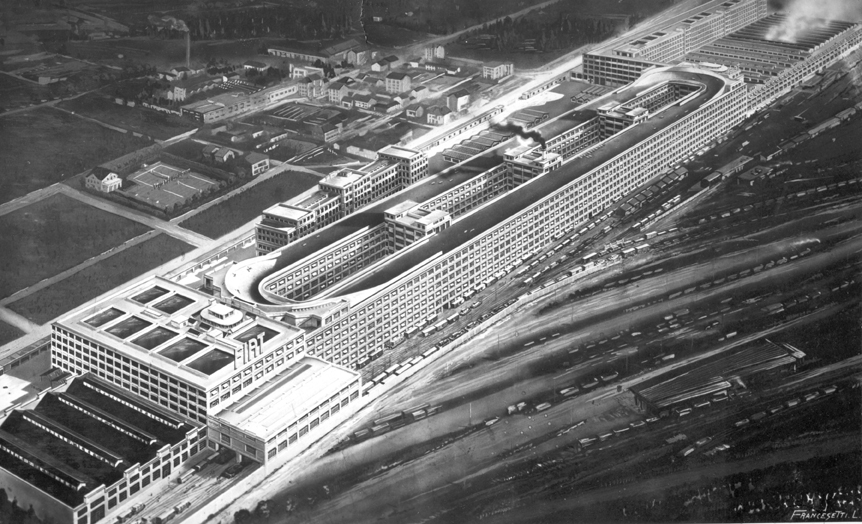
Lingotto factory (1928)

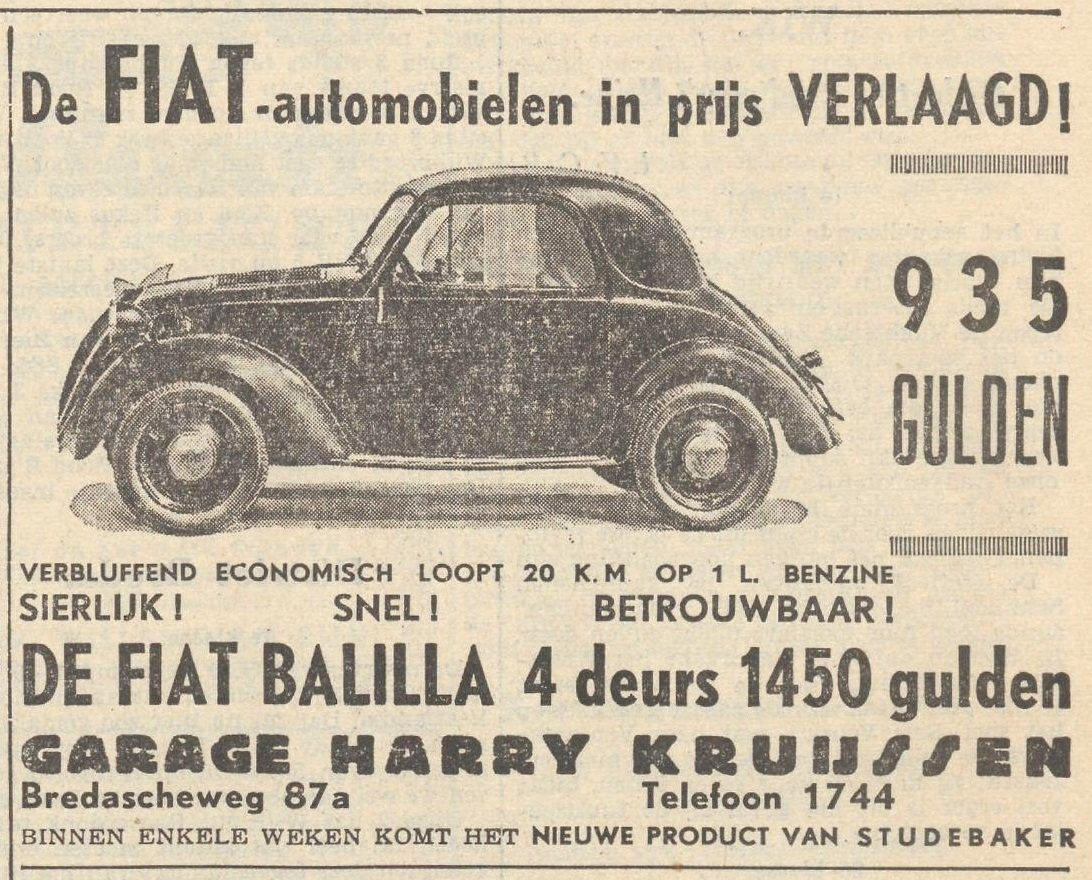
Advertisement, 1939

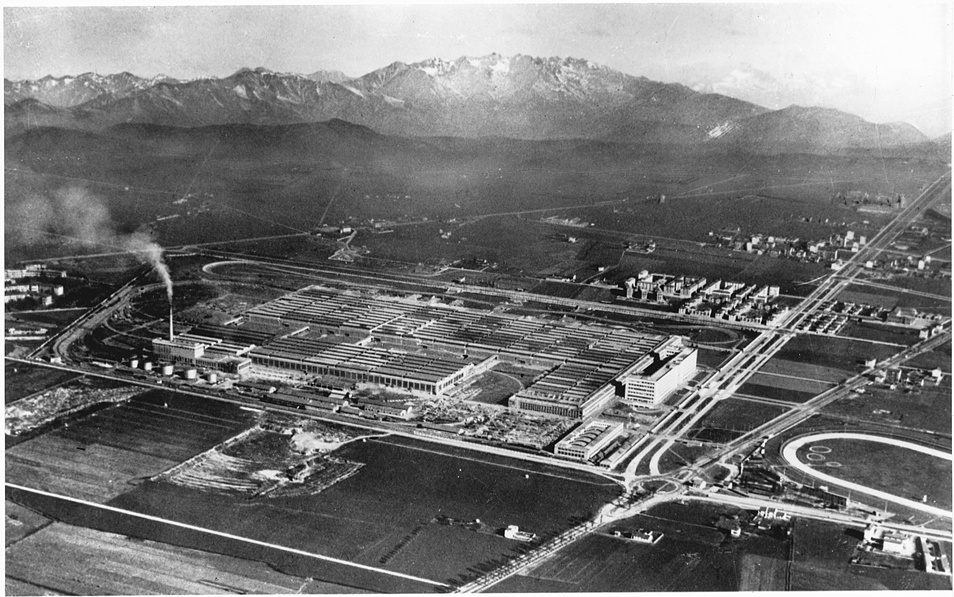
Mirafiori plant

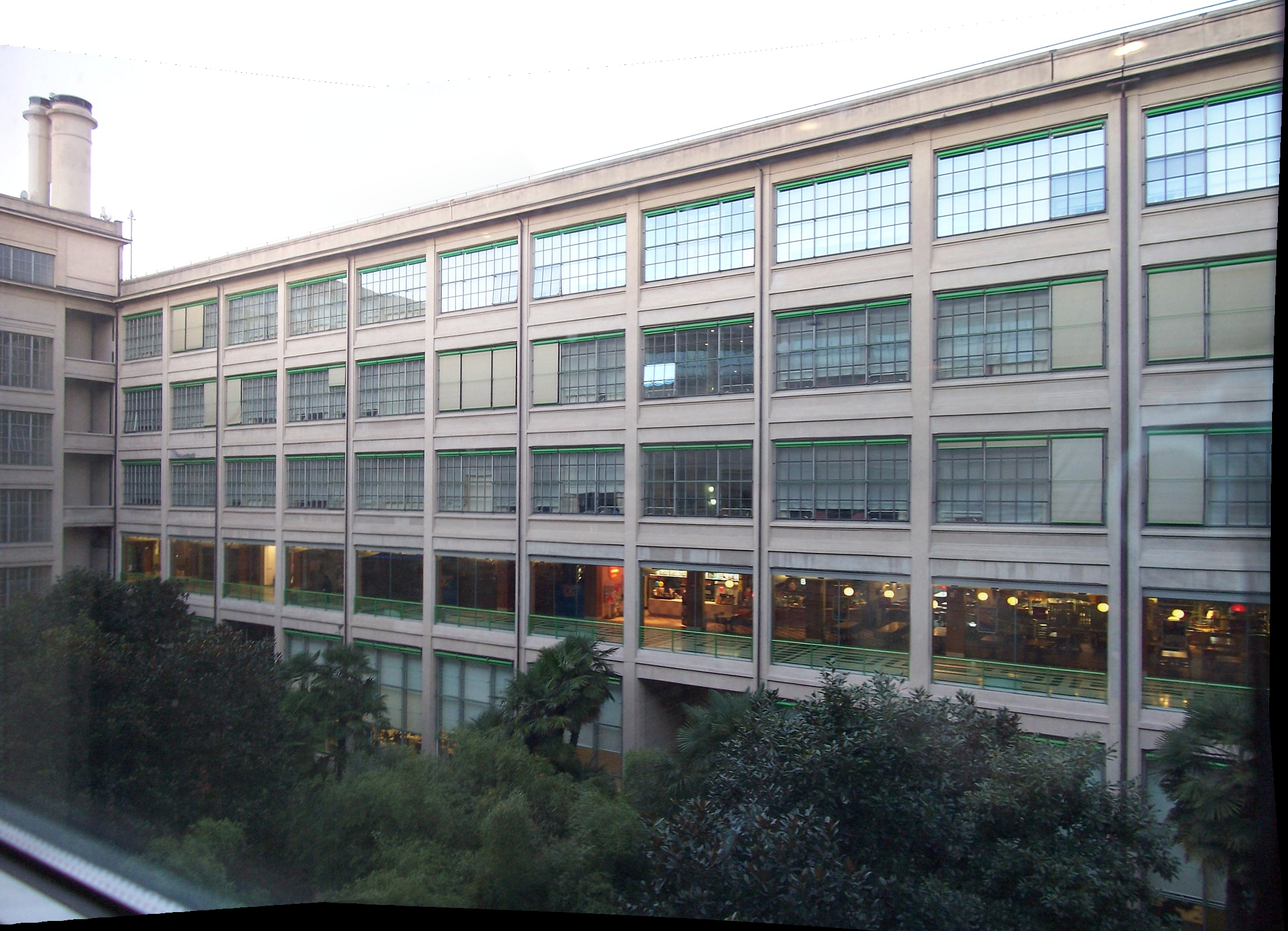
Lingotto factory (2008)

Giovanni Agnelli, with several investors, founded the Fabbrica Italiana Automobili Torino (Italian Automobile Factory of Turin; FIAT) in 1899. Its acronymous name was changed to upper- and lower-case Fiat in 1906. Agnelli led the company until his death in 1945, while Vittorio Valletta administered the firm's daily activities. Its first car, the 3 ½ CV, of which only 24 copies were built, all bodied by Alessio of Turin, strongly resembled contemporary Benz, and had a 697 cc (42.5 cu in) boxer twin engine. In 1903, Fiat produced its first truck. In 1908, the first Fiat was exported to the US. That same year, the first Fiat aircraft engine was produced. Also around the same time, Fiat taxis became popular in Europe.

By 1910 Fiat was the largest automotive company in Italy – a position it has retained since. That same year, a new plant was built in Poughkeepsie, NY, by the newly founded American FIAT Automobile Company. Owning a Fiat at that time was a sign of distinction. The cost of a Fiat in the US was initially $4,000 and rose up to $6,400 in 1918, compared to $825 for a Ford Model T in 1908, and $525 in 1918, respectively. During World War I, Fiat had to devote all of its factories to supplying the Allies with aircraft, engines, machine guns, trucks, and ambulances. Upon the entry of the US into the war in 1917, the factory was shut down as US regulations became too burdensome. After the war, Fiat introduced its first tractor, the 702. By the early 1920s, Fiat had a market share in Italy of 80%.

In 1921 workers seized Fiat's plants and hoisted the red flag of communism over them, to which Agnelli responded by quitting the company. However, the Italian Socialist Party and its ally organization, the Italian General Confederation of Labour, in an effort to effect a compromise with the centrist parties ordered the occupation to end. In 1922, Fiat began to build the famous Lingotto car factory—then the largest in Europe—which opened in 1923. It was the first Fiat factory to use assembly lines; by 1925, Fiat controlled 87% of the Italian car market. In 1928, with the 509, Fiat included insurance in the purchase price.

Fiat made military machinery and vehicles during World War II for the Italian army and Regia Aeronautica, and later for the Germans. Fiat made fighter aircraft like the biplane CR.42 Falco, which was one of the most common Italian aircraft, along with Savoia-Marchettis, as well as light tanks, obsolete compared to their German and Soviet counterparts, and armoured vehicles. The best Fiat aircraft was the G.55 fighter, which arrived too late and in too limited numbers to impact the outcome of the war.

In 1945 the National Liberation Committee removed the Agnelli family from leadership roles in Fiat because of its ties to Mussolini's government. These were not returned until 1963, when Giovanni's grandson, Gianni, took over as general manager until 1966 and as chairman until 1996.

Fiat launched a nuclear research program in the 1950s. It was the first private company in Europe to host its own nuclear reactor.

=== Gianni Agnelli ===
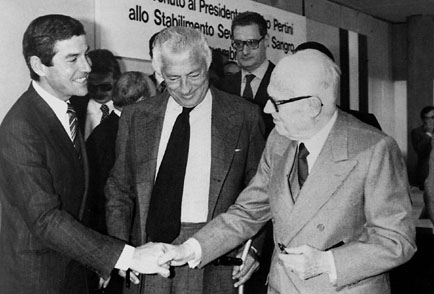
Gianni Agnelli (in the center) and the Fiat board of directors meet Italian President Sandro Pertini (at his right) during an official visit to the new Sevel Val di Sangro factory, 1981.

Among the younger Agnelli's first steps after gaining control of Fiat was a massive reorganization of the company management, which had previously been highly centralized, with little provision for the delegation of authority and decision-making. Such a system was effective in the past, but lacked the responsiveness and flexibility needed by Fiat's steady expansion, and the growth of its international operations in the 1960s. The company was reorganized on a product-line basis, with two main product groups—one for passenger cars, the other for trucks and tractors—and a number of semi-independent division and subsidiaries. Top management, freed from responsibility for day-by-day operations of the company, was able to devote its efforts to more far-reaching goals. In 1967, Fiat made its first acquisition when it purchased Autobianchi; with sales amounting to $1.7 billion, it outstripped Volkswagen, its main European competitor, and in 1968 produced some 1,750,000 vehicles while its sales volume climbed to $2.1 billion. According to Newsweek in 1968, Fiat was "the most dynamic automaker in Europe...[and] may come closest to challenging the worldwide supremacy of Detroit." Then, in 1969, it purchased controlling interests in Ferrari and Lancia. At the time, Fiat was a conglomerate, owning Alitalia, toll highways, a typewriter and office machine manufacturer, electronics and electrical equipment firms, a paint company, a civil engineering firm, and an international construction company. Following up on an agreement Valletta had made with Soviet officials in 1966, Agnelli constructed the AvtoVAZ plant in the new city of Togliattigrad on the Volga. This began operation in 1970, producing a local version of the Fiat 124 as the Lada. On his initiative, Fiat automobile and truck plants were also constructed in industrial centers of Yugoslavia, Poland, Bulgaria, and Romania. In 1973, Fiat established Comau, an industrial automation company out of the various suppliers which had equipped the AvtoVAZ plant in Russia. Comau became an industry pioneer in the use of Robotics for vehicle assembly – a technology with which Fiat would become synonymous for in the 1970s, with its "Robogate" system for bodyshell manufacture, and the later FIRE family of robot-assembled engines in the 1980s.

Despite offering a relatively competitive range of cars, Fiat was not immune from the financial pressures that the auto industry confronted following the 1973 oil price shock. Towards the end of 1976 it was announced that the Libyan government was to take a 9.6% shareholding in the company in return for a capital injection worth an equivalent of £250 million. The size of the Libyan investment is apparent when it is compared to the £310 million IMF loan that the Italian government was trying to negotiate at the time. Other aspects of the Libyan agreement included the construction of a truck and bus plant at Tripoli. Chairman Agnelli candidly described the deal as "a classic petro-money recycling operation which will strengthen the Italian reserves, provide Fiat with fresh capital and give the group greater tranquility in which to carry out its investment programmes". Equally noteworthy was the fact that despite the dilutive effect of the Libyan investment on existing shareholders, the company's largest shareholder, the Agnelli family, retained a 30% stake in the recapitalised business.

In 1979 the company became a holding company when it spun off its various businesses into autonomous companies, one of them being Fiat Auto. Vittorio Ghidella was named CEO. That same year, sales reached an all-time high in the US, corresponding to the Iranian Oil Crisis. However, when gas prices fell again after 1981, Americans began purchasing sport utility vehicles, minivans, and pickup trucks in larger numbers (marking a departure from their past preference for large cars). Also, Japanese automakers had been taking an ever-larger share of the car market, increasing at more than half a percent a year. Consequently, in 1984, Fiat and Lancia withdrew from the United States market. In 1989, it did the same in the Australian market, although it remained in New Zealand.

In 1986 Fiat acquired Alfa Romeo from the Italian government. Also, in 1986 15% of Fiat company stock was still owned by Libya, an investment dating back to the mid-seventies. US foreign policy under President Reagan's administration canceled a Pentagon contract to produce earth movers with Fiat and pressured the company into brokering a buyout of the Libyan investment. In 1992, two top corporate officials in the Fiat Group were arrested for political corruption. A year later, Fiat acquired Maserati. In 1995 Alfa Romeo exited the US market. Maserati re-entered the US market under Fiat in 2002. Since then, Maserati sales there have been increasing briskly.

=== Paolo Fresco ===
Paolo Fresco became chairman of Fiat in 1998 with the hope that the veteran of General Electric would bring more emphasis on shareholder value to Fiat. By the time he took power, Fiat's market share in Italy had fallen to 41% from around 62% in 1984. However, a Jack Welch-like management style would be much harsher than that used by the Italians (e.g., precarious versus lifetime employment). Instead, Fresco focused on offering more incentives for good performance, including compensation using stock options for top and middle management.

But his efforts were frustrated by union objections. Unions insisted that pay raises be set by length of tenure, rather than performance. Another conflict was over his preference for informality (the founder, Giovanni Agnelli, used to be a cavalry officer). He often referred to other managers by their first name, although company tradition obliged one to refer to others using their titles (e.g., "Chairman Fresco"). The CEO of the company, Paolo Cantarella, ran the day-to-day affairs of the company, while Fresco determined company strategy and especially acted as a negotiator for the company. In 1999, Fiat formed CNH Global by merging New Holland NV and Case Corporation.

In 2003 Fiat shed its insurance sector, which it was operating through Toro Assicurazioni to the DeAgostini Group. In the same year, Fiat sold its aviation business, FiatAvio to Avio Holding. In February 2004, the company sold its interest in Fiat Engineering, as well as its stake in Edison.

=== Sergio Marchionne ===
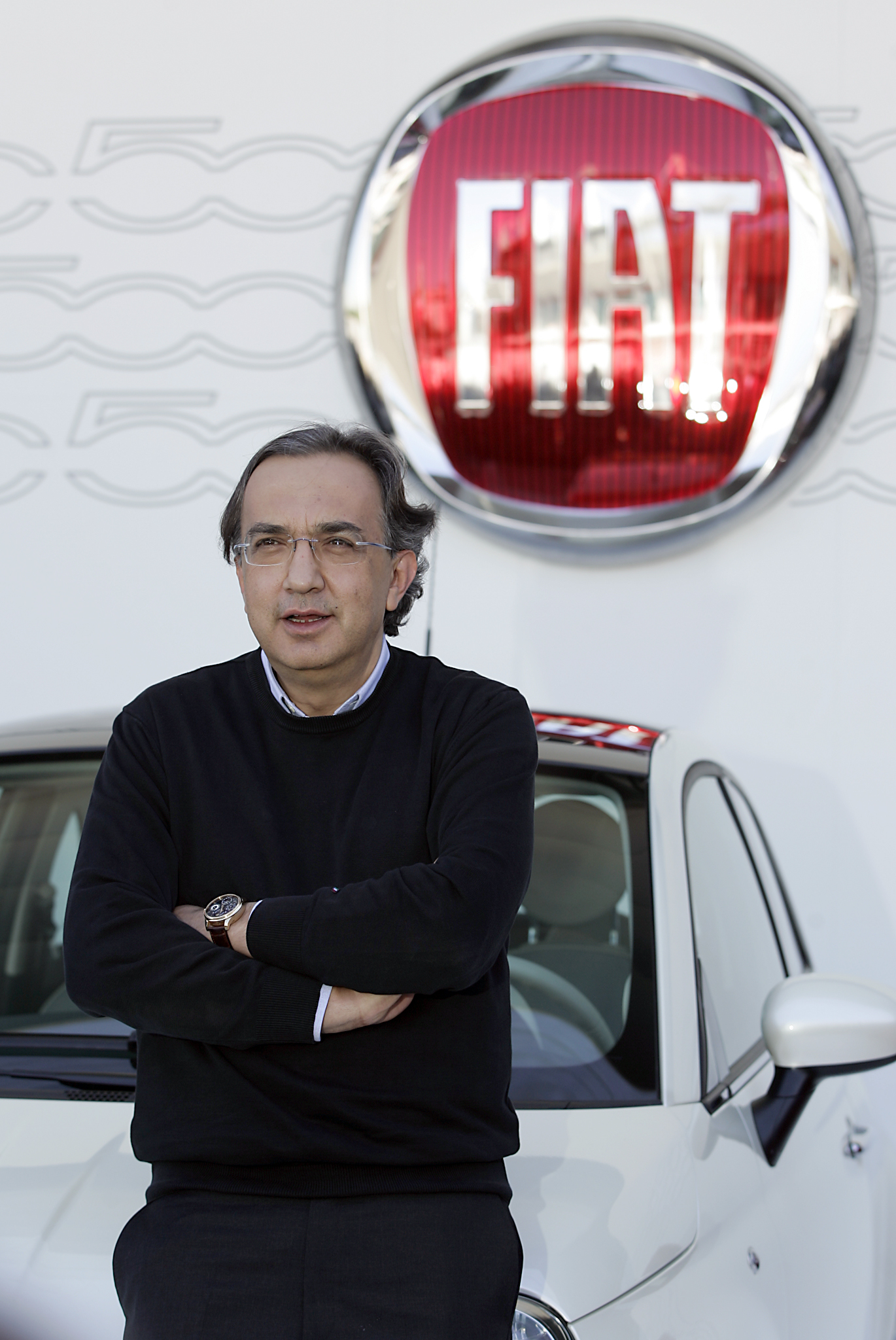
Sergio Marchionne, chief executive officer of Fiat Group

Sergio Marchionne was appointed CEO of Fiat in 2004 and initially he impressed investors. At the end of the 2005 financial year, the company saw its first profit in 17 quarters of €196M for the first 9 months of FY2006.

Marchionne reduced Fiat's managerial bureaucracy refocused the business on markets and profit. While chairman, Luca di Montezemolo, dealt with politicians and unions, Marchionne rebuilt the car business. The success of the Grande Punto model was in large part responsible for the turnaround in Fiat's fortunes, but the award-winning 500 cemented it. Fiat formed a joint venture with India's Tata Motors, which has subsequently ended, and with China's Chery Motors which didn't conclude. In 2005 Fiat courted Ford, and returned to China with a joint venture GAC Fiat created in 2010. Under Marchionne Fiat also re-entered several large markets that it had exited years before, such as Mexico and Australia.

Fiat Group Automobiles (FGA) was created on 1 February 2007 from Fiat Auto.

Simultaneously Fiat Automobiles, Abarth & C., Alfa Romeo Automobiles, Lancia Automobiles and Fiat Light Commercial Vehicles were created, all controlled 100 percent by Fiat Group Automobiles. The former brand directors became CEOs of the new societies, while the employees and production facilities remained under Fiat Group Automobiles.

In December 2008 Marchionne announced Fiat had to become one of the top five automakers to survive in the long run. Under Marchionne's leadership, Fiat returned to Canadian and American markets with the new 500. However, since 2009, Marchionne has presided over a business that has experienced a loss in European market share from 9.3 to 6.2 percent. In December 2013, Marchionne announced that he intended to discontinue the Grande Punto so that the company could focus on "cool, high margin" Fiat 500 (2007) variants and the Fiat Panda.

In 2010 John Elkann became the Chairman of Fiat and shareholders approved a plan to demerger Fiat's capital goods businesses. Agricultural and construction equipment manufacturer CNH Global, truck maker Iveco, and the industrial and marine division of Fiat Powertrain Technologies were spun off into a new group on 1 January 2011. The parent company, Fiat Industrial, was listed on the Milan stock exchange on 3 January 2011.

In 2010 credit rating agency Fitch cut Fiat's debt rating to BB− after it had accumulated a debt of around €9,300,000,000. In 2013, Fiats debt rating was cut again, this time by Moody's, to Ba3 over concerns European demand was lower and debt was falling slower than expected. The Financial Times estimate of Fiat's debt at the time was almost €28,000,000,000.

=== Acquisition of Chrysler ===
On 20 January 2009 Fiat Group and Chrysler Group announced their intention to form a global alliance. Under the terms of the agreement, Fiat would take a 20% stake in Chrysler and gain access to its North American distribution network in exchange for providing Chrysler with technology and platforms to build smaller, more fuel-efficient vehicles in the US and providing reciprocal access to Fiat's global distribution network. Agreements were signed on 30 April 2009, with Fiat's future shareholding capped at 49% until all government loans had been repaid.

In addition, the proposed agreement would entitle Fiat to receive a further 15% (without cash consideration) through the achievement of specific product and commercial objectives. No cash or financial support was required from Fiat under the agreement. Instead it would obtain its stake mainly in exchange for covering the cost of retooling a Chrysler plant to produce one or more Fiat models for in the US. Fiat would also provide engine and transmission technology to enable Chrysler to introduce smaller, fuel-efficient models in the NAFTA market. The deal was engineered by Fiat chief Sergio Marchionne. The principal objective of the partnership was to provide both groups with significantly enhanced economies of scale and geographical reach at a time when they were struggling to compete with larger and more global rivals such as Toyota, Volkswagen and alliance partners Renault and Nissan.

Fiat would not have to pay any money for its 20% of Chrysler. On 7 June 2009, the Indiana State Police Pension Fund, the Indiana Teacher's Retirement Fund, and the state's Major Moves Construction Fund asked the US Supreme Court to delay the sale of Chrysler to Fiat while they challenge the deal. The funds argued that the sale went against US bankruptcy law because it unlawfully rewarded unsecured creditors ahead of secured creditors. On 9 June 2009, the Supreme Court lifted the temporary hold, clearing the way for Fiat to acquire Chrysler. See Indiana State Police Pension Trust v. Chrysler for more information. On 10 June, the Supreme Court announced that Fiat was now an owner of the Chrysler Group.

Marchionne was appointed CEO of Chrysler following its emergence from bankruptcy proceedings. Under his leadership, Chrysler has taken on a structure similar to that of Fiat and has released, in quick succession, a large number of completely redesigned or refreshed vehicles. Fiat launched its 500, which had been available in Europe since 2007, in the United States and Canada in 2011, marking the company's return to the American auto market, which it had been absent from since 1984. Prior to this, Fiat's main presence on the continent was Mexico, where it offers a greater variety of products than in the United States and Canada.

On 10 January 2011 Fiat announced that it had increased its share in Chrysler from 20% to 25% following the achievement of the first of three performance objectives. On 11 April 2011, it announced achievement of the second performance objective, increasing its stake a further 5% to 30%. On 24 May 2011, Fiat announced that it had paid Chrysler US$1,268 million for a further 16% interest, increasing its stake total stake to 46% (fully diluted). The transaction coincided with Chrysler refinancing its debt to the U.S. and Canadian governments. On 25 May autonews.com reported that Fiat could buy government stakes in Chrysler as soon as the end of July 2011, increasing its total stake to 54%.

In May 2011 it emerged that Fiat could actually increase its stake in Chrysler Group to more than 70 percent through the exercise of further options.

In a regulatory filing dated 22 July 2011, the Michigan-based automaker reported that Fiat held a 53.5% interest (fully diluted). Fiat and Chrysler have both stated that they expect that interest to reach 58.5% by the end of 2011 as result of achievement of the third of the three performance objectives. On 5 January 2012 Fiat released press info that the ownership has increased to 58.5%. The stake was further increased to 68.49% in July 2013. On 1 January 2014, Fiat announced it would be acquiring the remaining shares of Chrysler owned by the VEBA worth $3.65 billion. The deal was completed by 21 January.

On 29 January 2014 it was announced that Fiat Group and Chrysler Group would be merged into a new company, Fiat Chrysler Automobiles (FCA), incorporated in the Netherlands with tax domicile in the UK. Fiat Chrysler Automobiles will become the owner of Fiat Group. On 1 August 2014, Fiat Group received necessary shareholder approval to proceed with the merger (which followed board approval). FCA will be listed on the New York Stock Exchange with an additional listing on the Mercato Telematico Azionario in Milan to follow. The merger became effective 12 October 2014.

== Activities ==
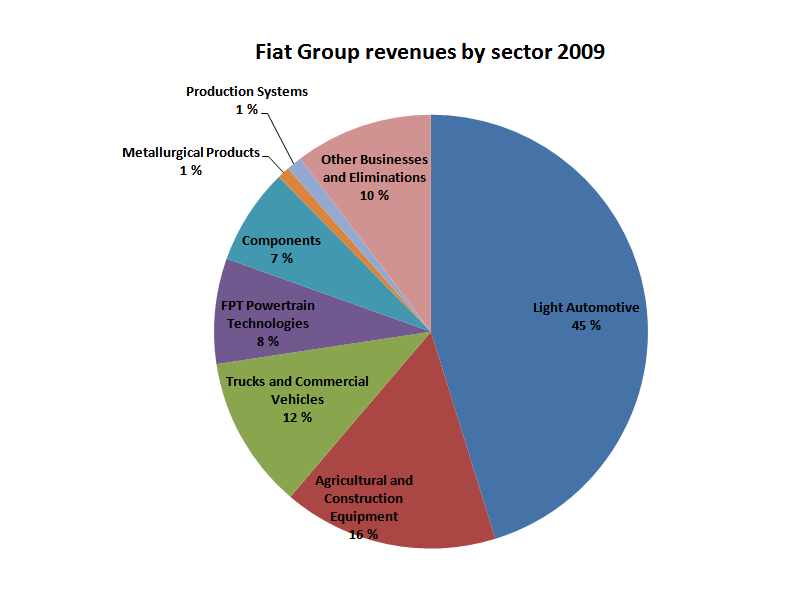
Fiat Group revenues by sector in 2009

The group's activities were initially focused on the industrial production of cars, industrial and agricultural vehicles. Over time it has diversified into many other fields, and the group now has activities in a wide range of sectors in industry and financial services. It is Italy's largest industrial concern. It also has significant worldwide operations, operating in 61 countries with 1,063 companies that employ over 223,000 people, 111,000 of whom are outside Italy.

Fiat's main shareholders include 30.1% by Exor S.p.A. (controlled by the Agnelli family), 24.9% by EU institutional investors, 11.2% by outside EU institutional investors and 2.6% by Baillie Gifford & Co., a Scottish investment management company.

=== Principal subsidiaries ===
Fiat S.p.A.'s principal operating subsidiaries (direct and indirect) include: Fiat Group Automobiles S.p.A., Chrysler Group LLC, Fiat Automoveis, S.A.; FGA Capital S.p.A. (a jv held 50% by FGA and 50% by Crédit Agricole CF), Ferrari S.p.A., Maserati S.p.A., Magneti Marelli S.p.A., Teksid S.p.A., Comau S.p.A., Itedi - Italiana Edizioni S.p.A. (see 2010 Annual Report)

=== Alliances and joint ventures ===
Fiat has undertaken numerous joint ventures and alliances. Commencing in 1978, the Type Four platform was an alliance between Alfa Romeo, Fiat, Lancia and Saab and resulting in a range of cars on sale in the mid-1980s.

In 2000 a number of joint ventures were established with General Motors following GM buying 20% of Fiat while Fiat bought 6% of GM. Complications with the relationship saw these JVs being wound back by 2005. Resulting projects included the GM Fiat Small platform and Fiat-GM Powertrain.

In 2005 Fiat formed an alliance with Ford to create a new small car, resulting in the Fiat 500 and Ford Ka.

In 2012 Fiat formed an alliance with Mazda to develop and build a new rear wheel drive roadster for the Alfa Romeo and Mazda brands.

=== Automotive ===
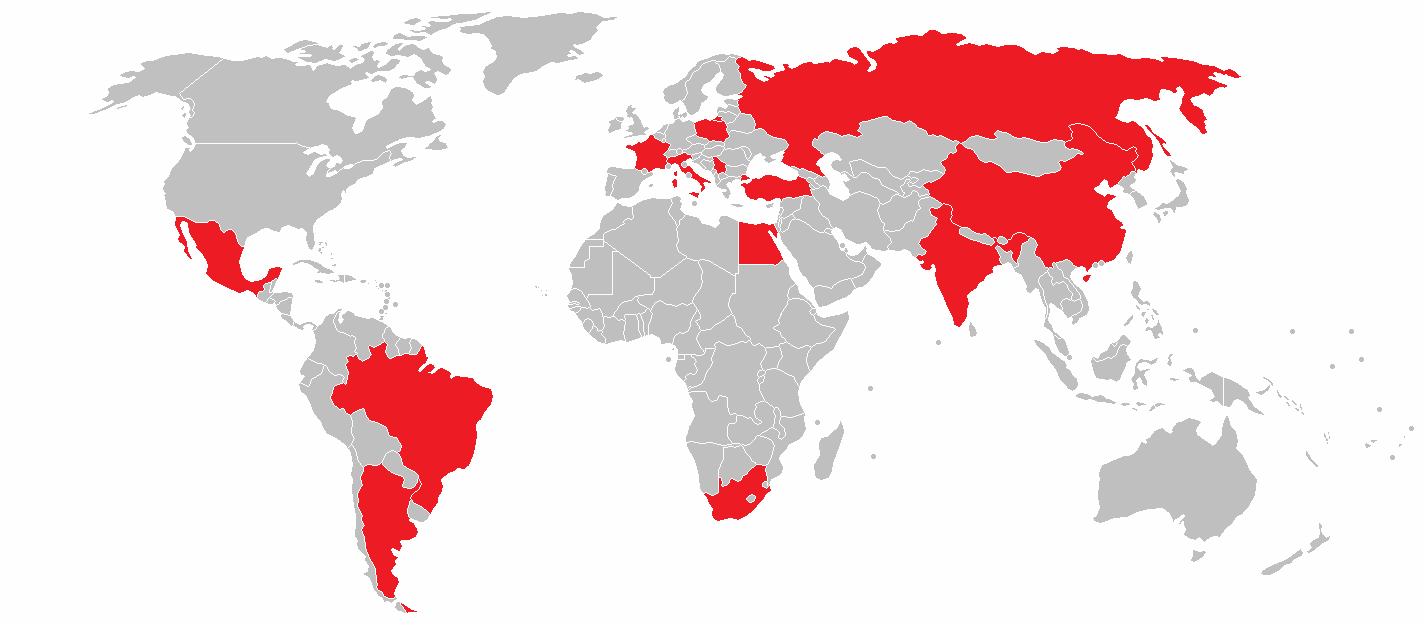
Global locations of Fiat Group automobile production sites, 2008. Including own plants, joint ventures and license production. Excluding Chrysler.

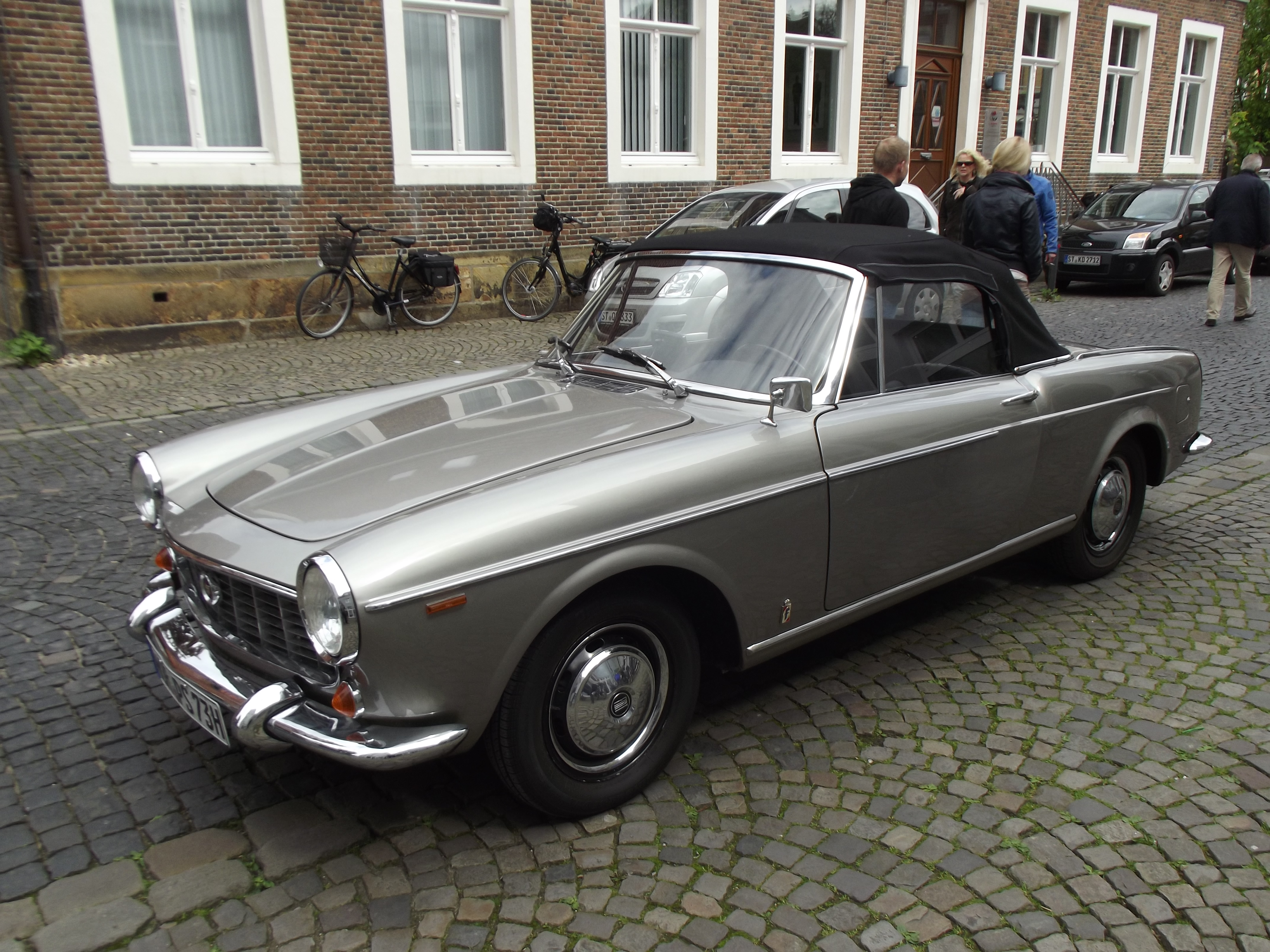
A Fiat 1500 at a vintage car event in Germany in May 2014

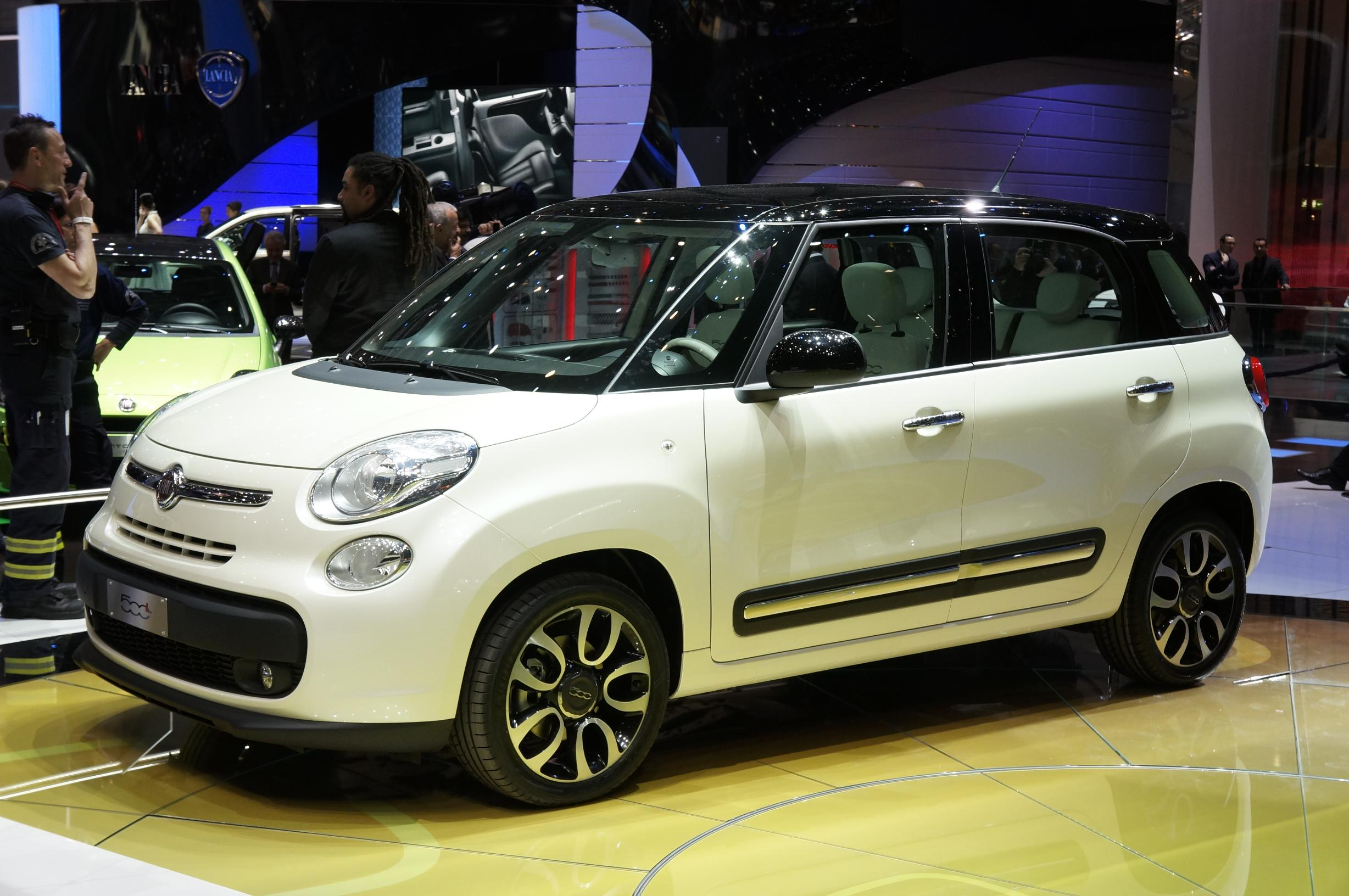
Fiat 500L in production from 2012

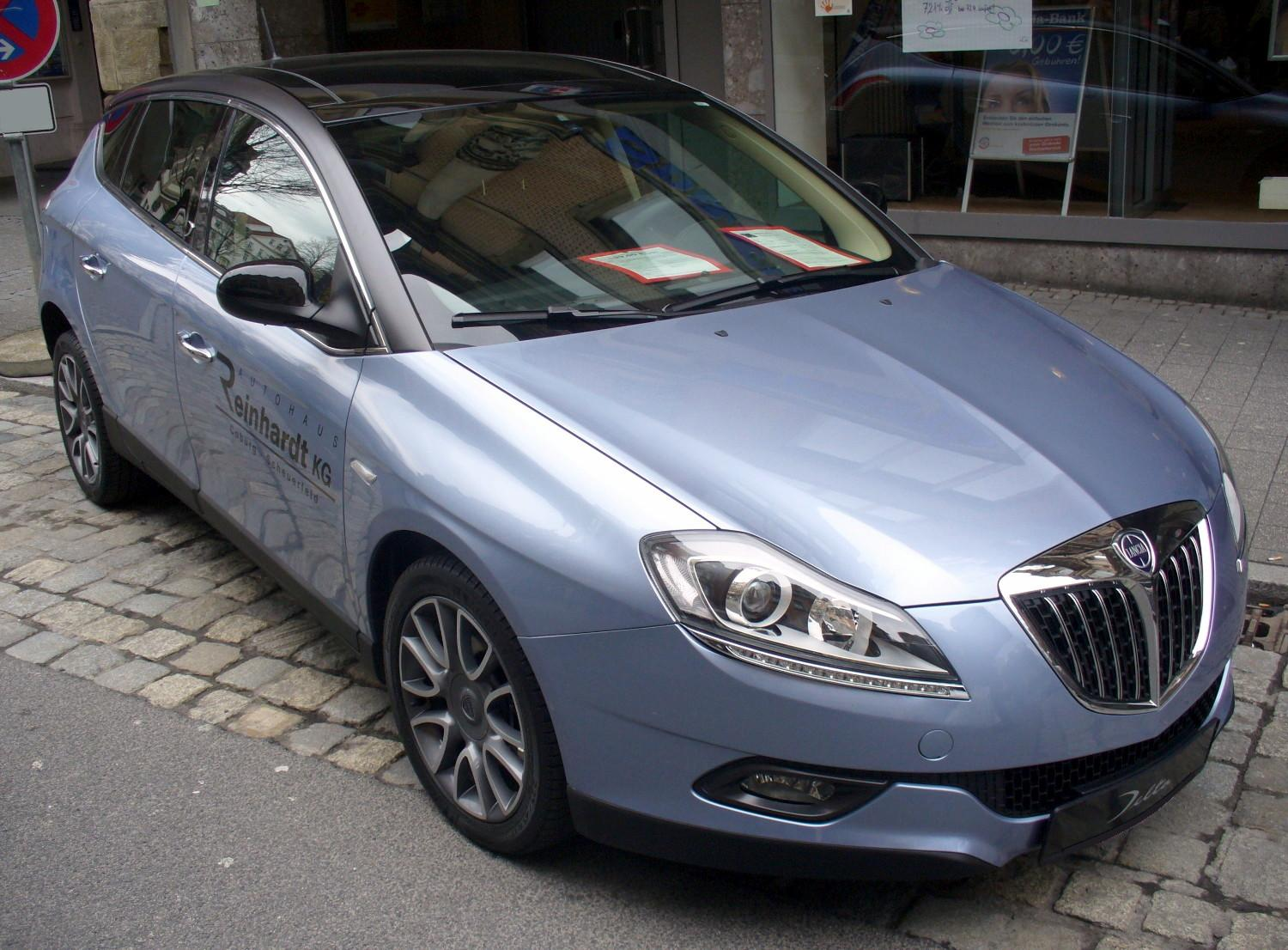
Lancia Delta

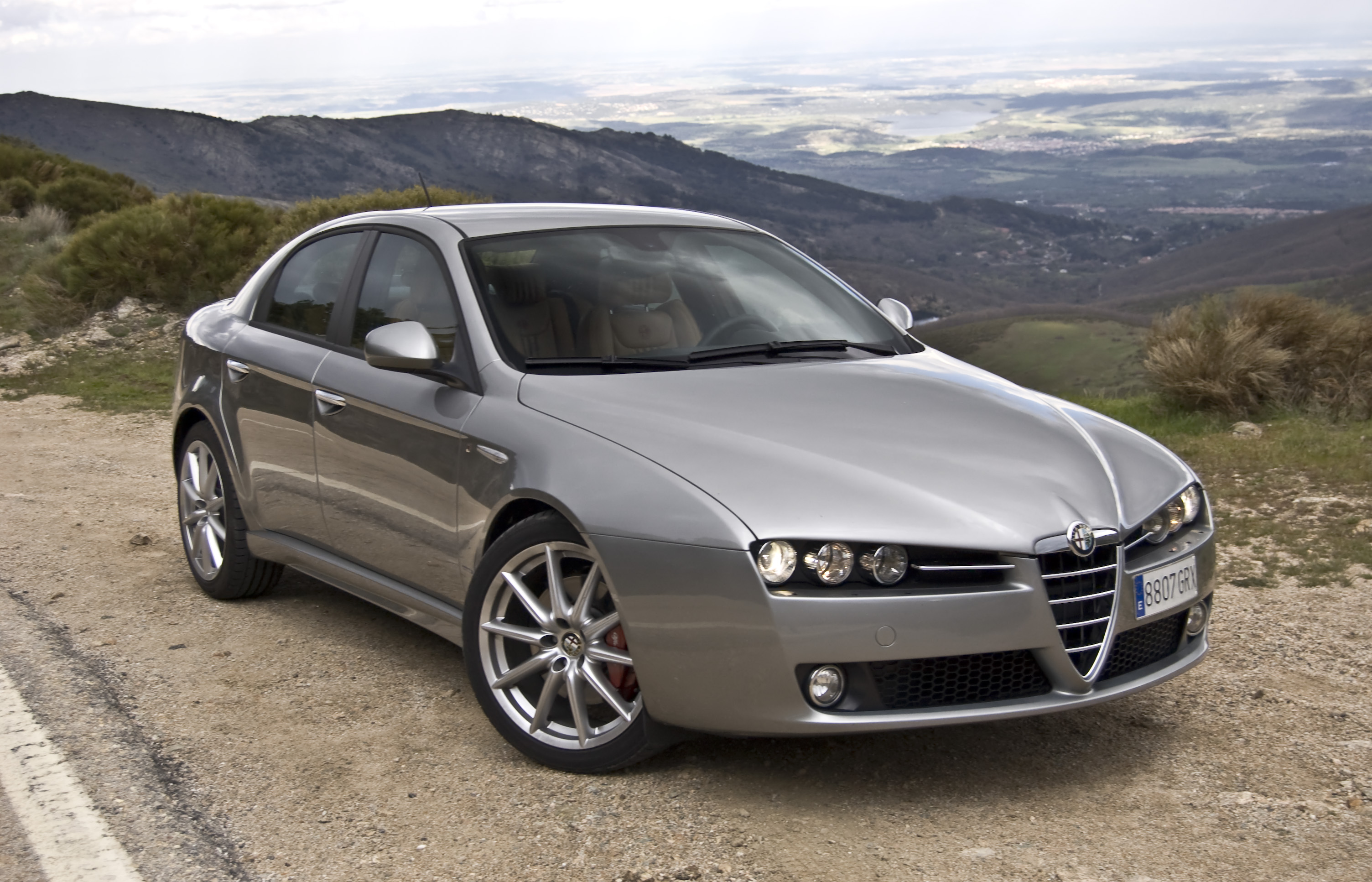
Alfa Romeo 159

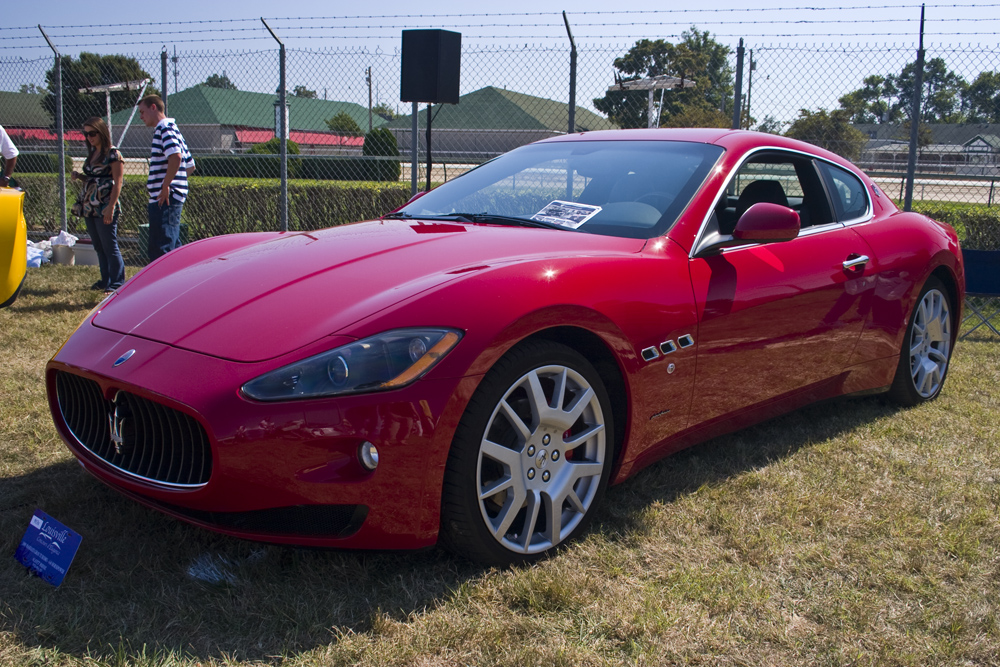
Maserati GranTurismo

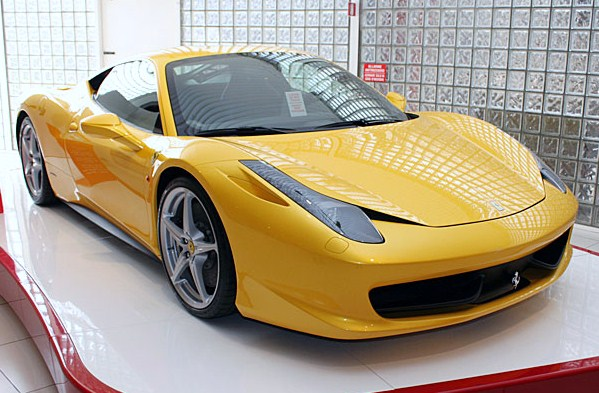
Ferrari 458 Italia

Fiat is the largest vehicle manufacturer in Italy, with cars ranging from small Fiat city cars to sports cars made by Ferrari, and vans and trucks such as the Ducato. Besides Fiat Group Automobiles S.p.A., Fiat Group automotive companies include Chrysler Group LLC and Maserati S.p.A. The Fiat Group Automobiles S.p.A. companies include: Abarth & C. S.p.A., Alfa Romeo Automobiles S.p.A., Fiat Automobiles S.p.A., Fiat Professional S.p.A. and Lancia Automobiles S.p.A.

Ferrari S.p.A. was 90% owned by the Fiat Group from 1968 to 2016. The company also owns Autobianchi S.p.A. but the marque has been dormant since 1995, and Innocenti Milano S.p.A., which ceased production in 1996.

The European Car of the Year award, Europe's premier automotive trophy for the past 50 years, has been awarded twelve times to the Fiat Group, more than any other manufacturer, most recently with the Fiat 500 in 2008.

Previous Fiat Group models which have won European Car of the Year: Fiat 124 (1967), Fiat 128 (1970), Fiat 127 (1972), Lancia Delta (1980), Fiat Uno (1984), Fiat Tipo (1989), Fiat Punto (1995), Fiat Bravo/Brava (1996), Alfa Romeo 156 (1998), Alfa Romeo 147 (2001) and the Fiat Panda (2004).

=== Trucks and buses ===
Fiat Industrial Vehicles (Fiat Veicoli Industriali) was Fiat's truck and bus division. It was created in 1903 with the launch of the 24HP model. By 1908 the company produced around 120 trucks, and by the end of 1918 production had grown to 17,000.

The operation closed in 1974 when Fiat created Iveco with OM, Lancia, Magirus and Unic.

Iveco was demerged into Fiat Industrial at the beginning of 2011.

=== Commercial vehicles ===
On 17 April 2007 Fiat Automobiles' light commercial vehicle unit Fiat Light Commercial Vehicles (Fiat Veicoli Commerciali) was rebranded as Fiat Professional. Some of Fiat's light commercial vehicle products include the Fiat Ducato, Fiat Scudo and Fiat Doblò Cargo.

=== Agricultural and construction equipment ===
For Fiat branded Agricultural & Construction equipments from 1917 to 1991, see Fiat Trattori and from 1992 to 2014, see CNH Global.

=== Components ===
The major Italian component maker Magneti Marelli was owned by Fiat from 1967 to 2018, and it in turn owns other brands such as AL-Automotive Lighting, Carello, Cromodora, Cofap, Ergom Automotive, Jaeger, Mako Elektrik, Paraflu, Seima, Siem SpA, Solex, Veglia Borletti, Vitaloni and Weber.

=== Metallurgical products ===
Fiat owns Teksid, the largest iron foundry group in the world with a production capacity of approximately 600,000 tons annually. The company was established in December 1978, and designs and produces cylinder blocks, cylinder heads, exhaust manifolds, drive shafts, camshafts and other components for automobiles and commercial vehicles. Teksid, which is specialized in casting and processing iron, has plants in France, Portugal, Poland, Brazil, Mexico and China. Since 2007, Teksid runs also Teksid Aluminum a company specialized in casting and producing auto components from aluminium alloys.

=== Production systems ===
Production systems are made mainly through Comau, which bought the American Pico, Renault Automation and Sciaky and produces industrial automation systems. In the 1970s and 1980s, the company became a pioneer in the use of industrial robotics for the assembly of motor vehicles. Fiat assembly plants are among the best automated and advanced in the world.

=== Services ===
An insurance company, Toro Assicurazioni, allowed Fiat to control a relevant part of this market (also with minor companies like Lloyd Italico) and to interact with some associated banks. Toro Assicurazioni was acquired by the giant insurance company Assicurazioni Generali and is no longer part of the Fiat Group.

==== Construction ====
Ingest Facility and Fiat Engineering work in various fields of construction, while IPI is a mediation company that also deals with the management of real estate properties.

==== Information technology ====
Fiat Group is present in IT fields and in communications with ICT—Information & Communication Technology, Global Value, TeleClient, London and Atlanet.

=== Publishing and communication ===
Fiat Group also has interests in several major publishing houses and national and local newspapers, such as La Stampa (created in 1926), Itedi, and Italiana Edizioni. A specialised advertising space reseller is Publikompass, supported by the Consorzio Fiat Media Center. Fiat is also has one of the largest shareholdings in RCS MediaGroup.

=== Other activities ===
Fiat Gesco, KeyG Consulting, Sadi Customs Services, Easy Drive, RM Risk Management and Servizio Titoli are minor companies that work for public services, delivering services in economics and financial fields. Other activities include industrial securitisation (Consorzio Sirio), treasury (Fiat Geva), Fiat Information & Communication Services.

Fiat supports the Fondazione Giovanni Agnelli, an important foundation for social and economic research. Palazzo Grassi, a well-known historic building in Venice, now a museum and formerly supported by Fiat, was eventually sold to the French businessman François Pinault in January 2005.

==== Aviation and motorcycles ====
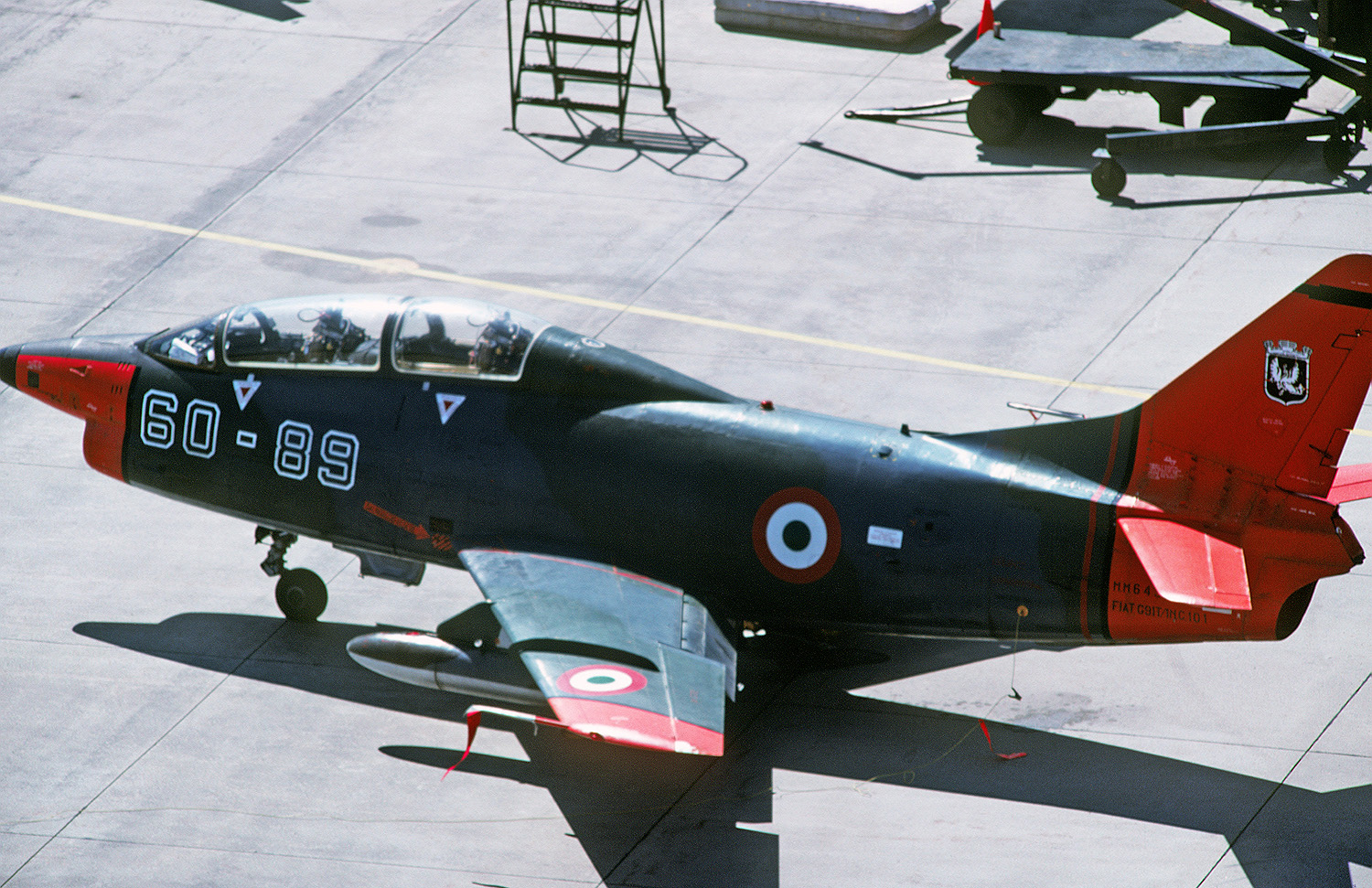
Fiat G91T training aircraft

Fiat, as Fiat Aviazione, was an important aircraft manufacturer, focused mainly on military aviation. After World War I, Fiat consolidated several Italian small aircraft manufacturers, like Pomilio and Ansaldo. Most famous were Fiat biplane fighter aircraft of the 1930s, Fiat CR.32 and Fiat CR.42. Other notable designs were fighters CR.20, G.50, G.55 and a bomber, the Fiat BR.20. In the 1950s, the company designed the G.91 light ground attack plane. In 1969, Fiat Aviazione merged with Aerfer to create Aeritalia.

In 1959 Piaggio came under the control of the Agnelli family. In 1964, the aeronautical and motorcycle divisions split to become independent companies. The aeronautical division was named IAM Rinaldo Piaggio. Today the aeronautical company Piaggio Aero is controlled by the family of Piero Ferrari, which also holds 10% of the carmaker Ferrari.

The motorcycle division Vespa thrived until 1992, when Giovanni Alberto Agnelli became CEO—but Agnelli was already suffering from cancer, and died in 1997. In 1999, Morgan Grenfell Private Equity acquired Piaggio.

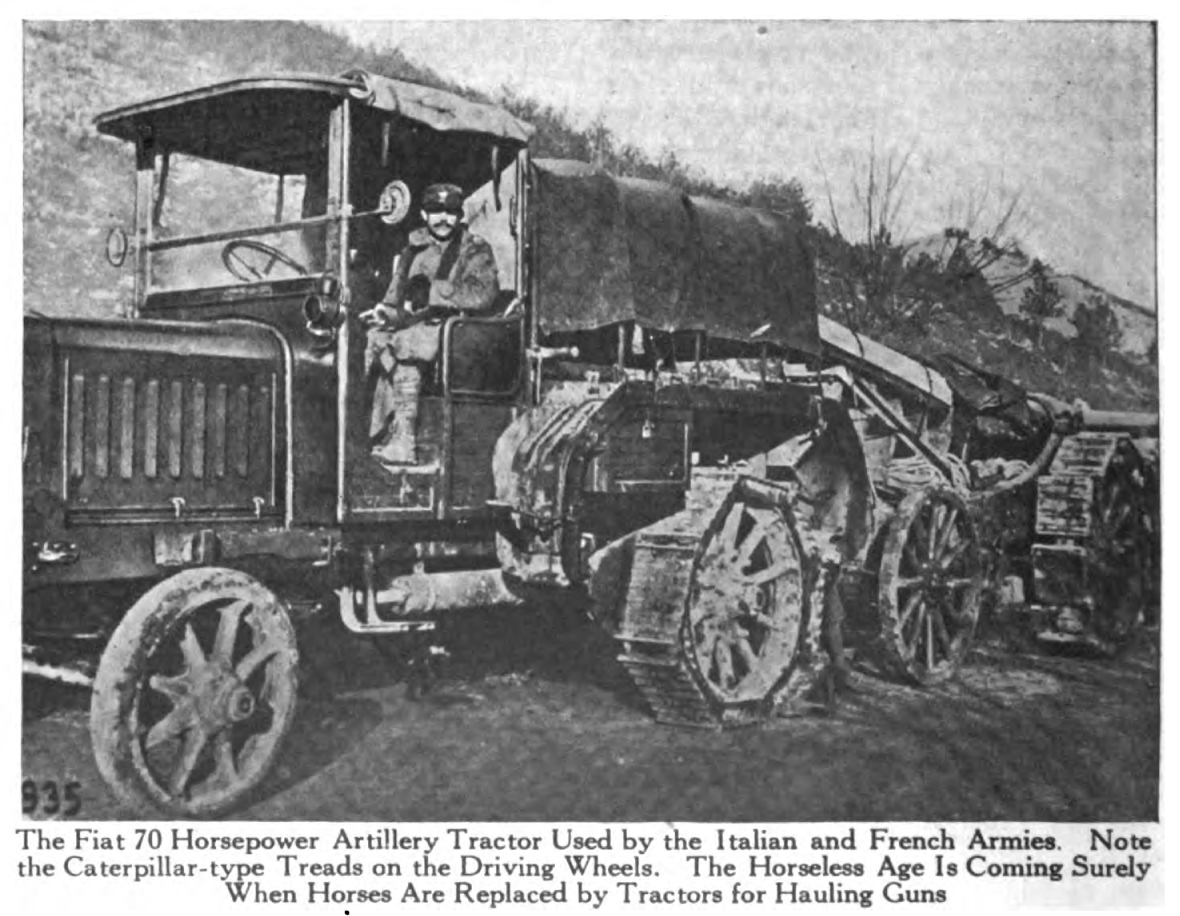
Fiat artillery tractor in the journal Horseless Age, 1918

==== Weapons ====
Fiat built artillery tractors for the French and Italian armies in World War I.

Società Anonima Fabbrica Armi Torino (SAFAT) was a wholly owned subsidiary of FIAT in the 1930s, designing and manufacturing weapons for the Italian armed forces. After losing a competition to produce a series of new machine-guns for the Regia Aeronautica, SAFAT was sold to the winning competitor – Società Italiana Ernesto Breda, forming Breda-SAFAT.

==== Rail transport ====
Fiat Ferroviaria's history goes back to before World War II, when Fiat provided motive power used for both Diesel and electric locomotives and railcars (littorine) not only in Italy, but other parts of Europe, and in South America. Fiat produced, among the rest, the successful Pendolino tilting trains, the first working prototype four-car set being run in the mid-1970s.

Fiat Ferroviaria was later sold to Alstom in 2000.

==== Recreation ====
The Fiat Group owned the Sestriere skiing facilities; the village in the Alps is a creation of the Agnelli family. The Sestriere skiing facilities were sold by the group in 2006.

== Enterprises outside Italy ==
See list of Fiat Group assembly sites

Fiat was a key player in developing motor industries for a number of countries from the 1950s, particularly in Eastern Europe, Spain, Egypt, Ethiopia and Turkey. The AutoVAZ state works Lada products in Tolyatti (Togliatti), Russia, were Fiat based, as were SEAT products of Spain. Lada is now controlled by Renault, and SEAT by Volkswagen. A small number of Fiats were built in Bulgaria. Among Fiat's earliest foreign assembly plants was one in Poughkeepsie, New York, between 1910 and 1917.

=== United States ===
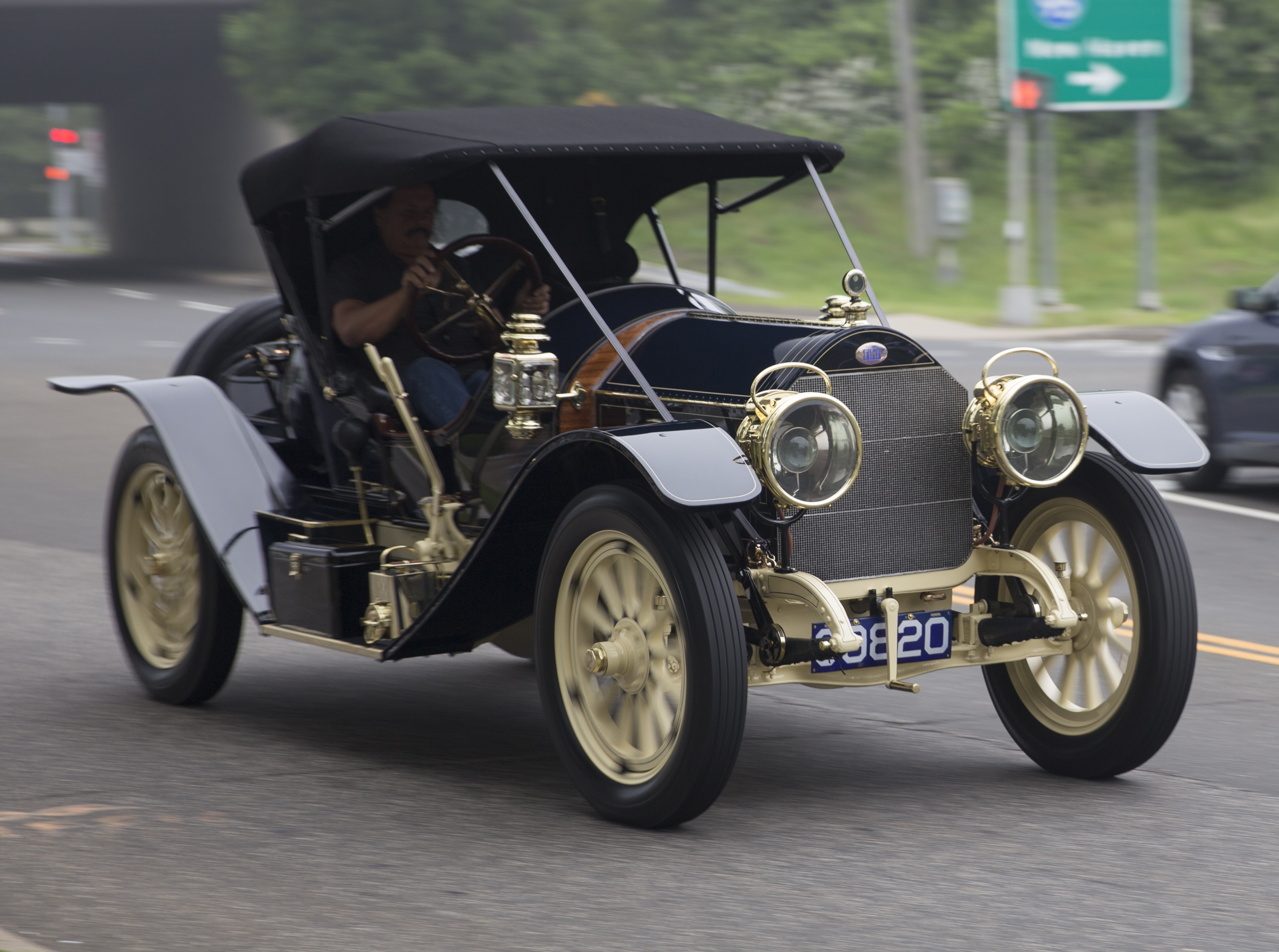
American-made Fiat Type 55 Fleetwood Roadster

The American FIAT Automobile Company was founded by American licensees in 1909 as a response to 45 percent tariffs on imported automobiles. The plant was finished in the spring of 1910 and the first car rolled off the production line in September 1910; all Poughkeepsie Fiats were built with parts shipped from Italy although they usually received locally made bodywork by companies like Holbrook, Quinby, or Fleetwood. American FIAT focused on the larger and more luxurious end of the range, with the smaller Types 51 and 52 (Tipo 1 and 2) only available to order as fully built-up imports.

The first model offered was the Type 54, corresponding to the European Tipo 4. This has a 5,699 cc (348 cu in) four-cylinder engine (itself called "Tipo 54A") and rode on a 124 in (3.15 m) wheelbase; it was manufactured until 1914 or 1915. This was joined by the large and expensive Type 56 in 1912, a seven-passenger touring car reserved for the American market. This model has a six-cylinder version of the Type 54 engine, displacing 8,549 cc (522 cu in) and mounted in a chassis with a 135 in (3.43 m) wheelbase. In 1913 the Type 55 arrived (although some Type 55s appear to have been sold in 1912), slightly shorter than the Type 56 with a 128 in (3.25 m) wheelbase but with a massive 9,017 cc (550 cu in) four-cylinder engine. This car was largely identical to the European Tipo 5 and was also manufactured for export. In 1914 the fourth and final American Fiat was introduced, the smaller Type 53 – the equivalent of the Italian Tipo 3 Ter. This has a 4,396 cc (268 cu in) four-cylinder engine and a 116 in (2.95 m) wheelbase. The Tipo 53 was built until 1916, while the 55 and 56 were manufactured until 1917, although late 55s seem to have been sold as "1918s" and they did appear in new-car catalogues that year. Fiat Italy took over the American operation in 1917 and reduced the lineup to the Type 55, now sitting on a 140 in (3.56 m) wheelbase. NACC tax horsepower figures were 30 hp for the Type 54, 45 for the Type 56, 42 for the Type 55, and 25 hp for the Type 53. Actual outputs were higher, ranging from 40 hp (30 kW) for the Type 53 to 75 hp (56 kW) for the big Types 55 and 56.

Output was never very large, Fiats being very expensive cars at the time, with annual production averaging around 350 cars. Once the United States entered the war, no more car parts were arriving from Italy and production was halted. There were plans for restarting production after the war but they came to naught and the plant was sold to Duesenberg in February 1918. Duesenberg proceeded to transfer the machinery to their plant in Elizabeth, NJ, to build aircraft engines. At the beginning of 1928 the facilities changed hands again, now belonging to truck manufacturers Larrabee Motor Truck Co. who transferred their activities there from Binghamton. The building went on to serve various functions, being part of the Marist College campus for a while, and was torn down in 1997.

=== Brazil ===
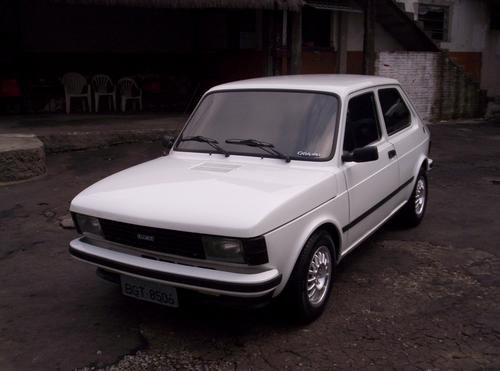
The 1979 Brazilian Fiat 147 was the first modern car to run on pure hydrous ethanol fuel (E100).

Fiat Automóveis S.A., a subsidiary of Fiat S.p.A., began making automobiles in Brazil in 1976 beginning with the production of the Fiat 147, the Brazilian version of the Italian Fiat 127, produced until 1986. More than 10,000,000 units have been produced in Fiat Automóveis factory in Betim since 1976, plus 232,807 units in the Fiat Argentina plant of Córdoba. The original factory, located in the city of Belo Horizonte, cost $250 million to build. The state of Minas Gerais had a 10–20% stake in the company and also provided special economic benefits to Fiat.

Launched in July 1979, the 147 was the first mass-produced car that ran on ethanol as fuel instead of petrol. The performance slightly increased and fuel consumption was 30% higher but the cost of the alcohol was a quarter of the gasoline because, at that time, petrol had become expensive as a consequence of the 1979 oil crisis. This version was nicknamed cachacinha (little cachaça) because it had the scent of that Brazilian drink.

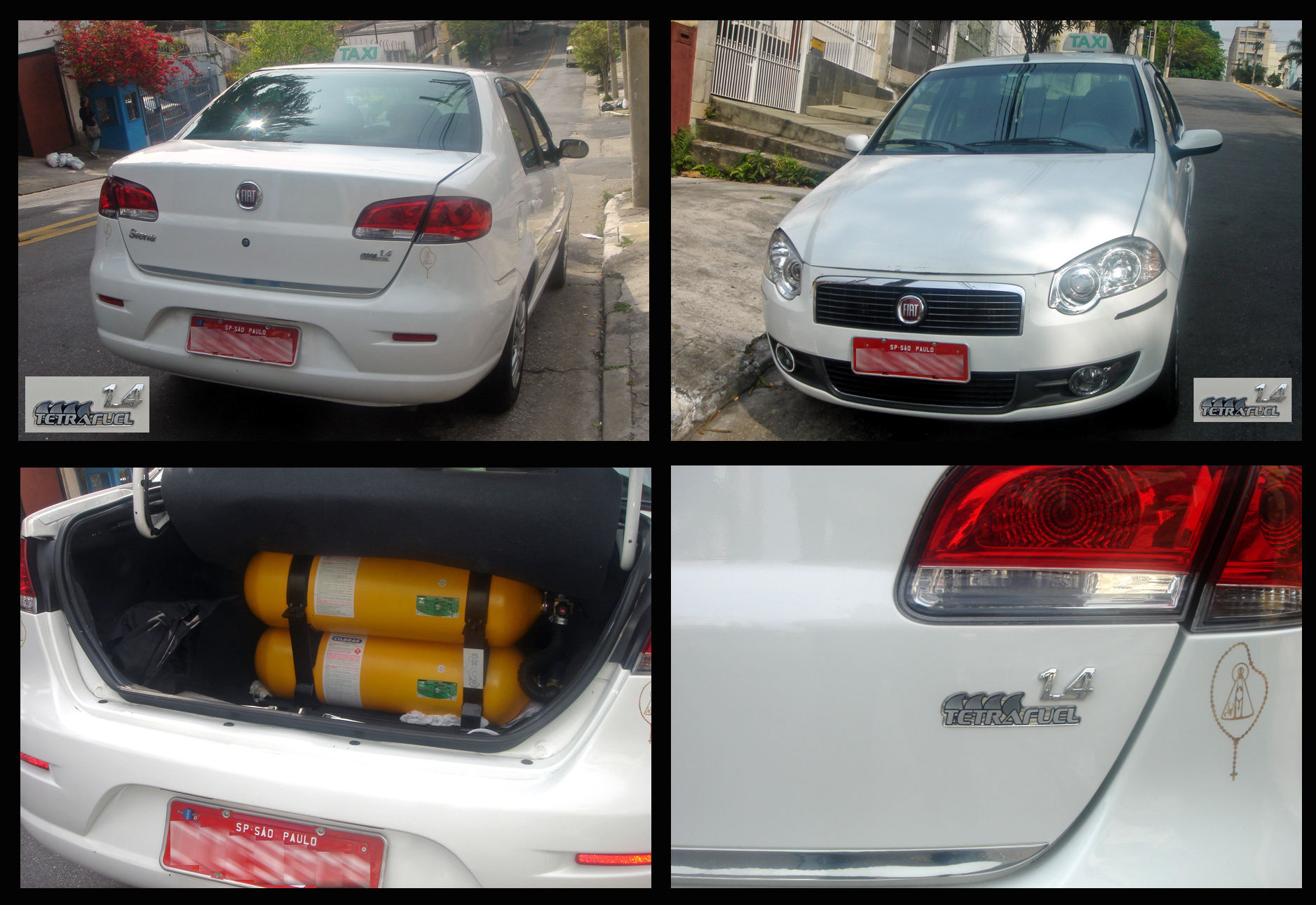
Fiat Siena Tetrafuel 1.4, a multifuel car that runs as a flexible-fuel on gasoline, E20-E25 gasohol, ethanol (E100); or as a bi-fuel with CNG

In October 1984 Fiat Automóveis introduced the Fiat Uno, which continued on sale until the end of 2013 as the renamed Fiat Mille, resulting in total production of 3.6 million vehicles. Production of the Fiat Palio world car began in 1996.

After the successful 2003 introduction of flexible-fuel vehicles in the Brazilian market, Fiat Automóveis launched its first flex model in March 2004, the Fiat Palio, followed by the Siena and Palio Weekend. Fiat sold 665,514 vehicles in Brazil in 2008, allowing the carmaker to continue as the market leader for seven years in a row. Flex fuel automobiles represented almost 100 percent of the car sales in 2008, and 92 percent of all light-duty trucks sold.

In 2006 Fiat introduced the Fiat Siena Tetra fuel, a four-fuel car developed under Magneti Marelli of Fiat Brazil. This automobile can run as a flex-fuel on 100% ethanol (E100); or on E20-E25 blend, Brazil's normal ethanol gasoline blend; on pure gasoline (though no longer available in Brazil since 1993, it is still used in neighboring countries); or just on natural gas (CNG). The Siena Tetrafuel was engineered to switch from any gasoline-ethanol blend to CNG automatically, depending on the power required by road conditions.

=== Argentina ===
Fiat has been present in Argentina since the beginning of the 20th century. There was a Fiat manufacturing plant in Córdoba at least as far back as 1954 when Fiat entered into a joint venture with two local companies to manufacture tractors. The company was known as Fiat-Concord until 1980. In 1959 the construction of a car plant in Caseros was approved, and 1960 saw the production there of the first Argentinian produced Fiat passenger car, a Fiat 600, after the Fiat 1100 Export and after in 1963 the Fiat 1500. In 1977 the Fiat 133 appeared; this was a rebadged SEAT 133, built in Argentina. By 1978 a car manufacturing facility was well established in Córdoba, producing Fiat 128s as well as two models which from the Italian perspective belonged in earlier decades, the 125 (with some derivates) and the 600R.

In 1980 a joint venture with PSA called Sevel Argentina was begun, which lasted until 1995. The current day automobile manufacturing started with a new factory opened in Córdoba on 20 December 1996. From April 1997 the Siena and Palio models production started.

Production was suspended in the early 2000s as the Argentinean economy went downhill. In 2008 Fiat invested new money and the production of Fiat Siena saloon and the Fiat Palio was started. In October 2009, a Fiat Siena HLX becomes the 2 million unit produced by Fiat in Argentina. The Fiat Auto Argentina S.A. is Fiat S.p.A. owned company.

=== Serbia ===
Its first enterprise came in 1955, when it agreed to a deal with Yugoslav carmaker Zastava to assemble Fiats for Eastern Europe. The first cars produced by Zastava were its versions of the Fiat 1300 and Fiat 1400. By 1970, Zastava was producing parts for the newer Fiat 124 and Fiat 125 models, which were assembled in Poland. The Zastava 750, launched in 1962, was Zastava's version of the iconic Fiat 600 minicar. It outlived the car on which it was based, with production lasting until 1981. Zastavas were not popular outside of Eastern Europe before the 1980s, although they were exported to the US and several European countries under the Yugo brand during the 1980s.

The most famous product launched by Zastava is the Zastava 101, a front-wheel drive car based on the Fiat 128, also available as a hatchback version never sold in Italy. With the demise of the Zastava 750 in 1981, the minicar gap in the Zastava range was filled by the Zastava Koral, which was best known in Britain and America as the Yugo Tempo or Yugo 45/55. It was based on the 1971 Fiat 127, which was due to be replaced by the Fiat Uno in 1983. Hostility towards Yugoslavia in the wake of the 1992 civil unrest saw a swift ending of imports to both Britain and America. The Zastava factory in Kragujevac was later bombed, but was rebuilt after the war ended, and production continued at another factory in Kragujevac.

In 1987 Zastava came up with a new car design. The Zastava Florida — also known as a Yugo, and in other markets as the Yugo Sana – was styled by Giorgetto Giugiaro at the ItalDesign studio, later featured a range of more modern Peugeot engines. Sales continued in its homeland, with an update at the end of the 1990s. Zastava did not launch another new car for another 16 years. The 2003 Zastava 10 model was another Fiat design—this time the second generation Punto, and in 2009 was renamed Fiat Punto Classic

A new memorandum of understanding between Fiat and the Serb ministry of economic and regional development about the acquisition of Zastava's Kragujevac plant in 2008 led to a new company being set up in which the Italians would have a 70 percent stake and the Serb government 30 percent. The factory was renamed from Zastava Automobili Srbija to Fiat Automobili Srbija. In 2010 and 2011, Fiat Automobili Srbija underwent large-scale reconstruction for production of the Fiat 500L in 2012.

=== Poland ===
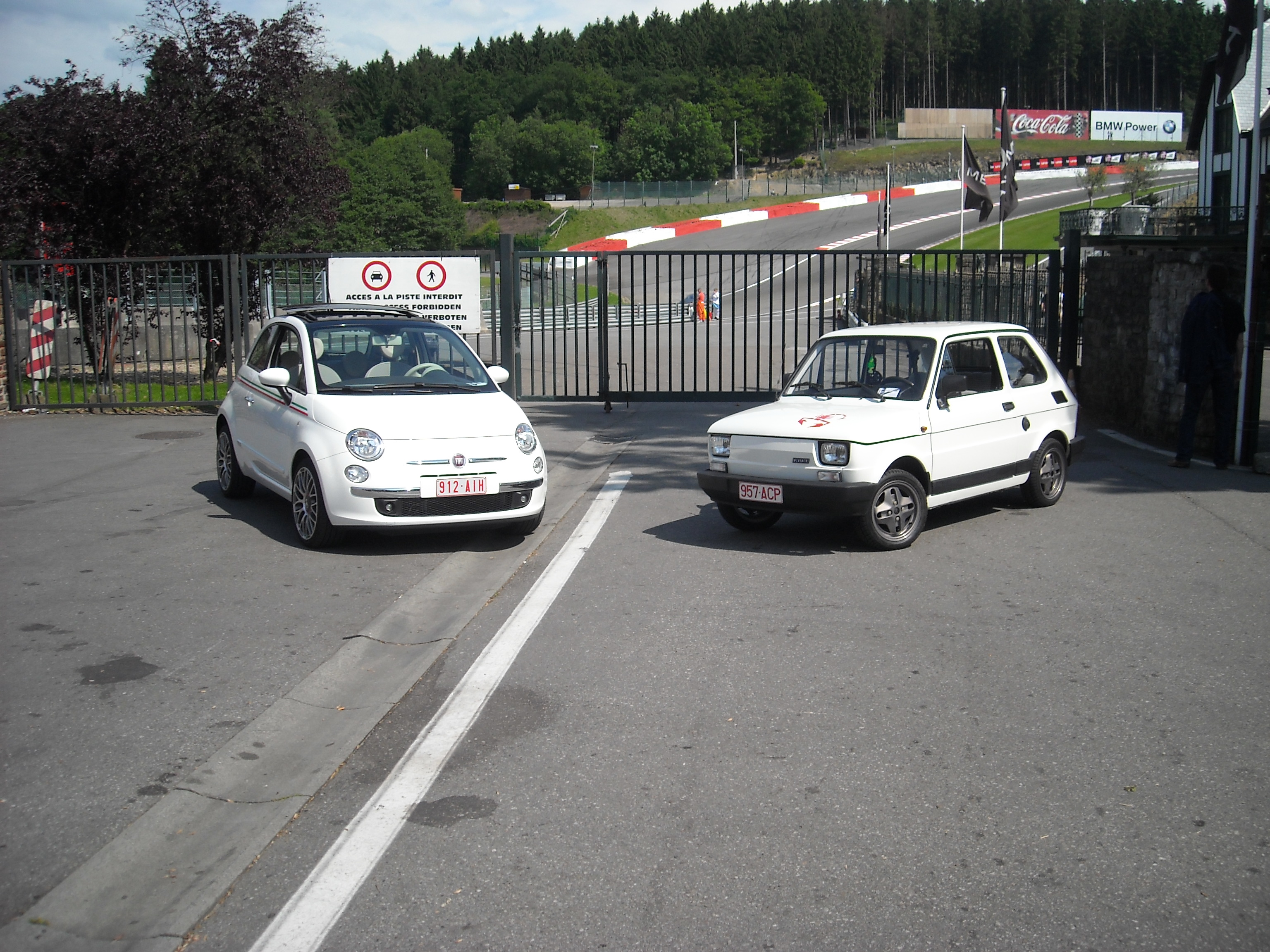
Fiat 500 and 126

Fiat automobiles have been made in Poland since 1920. In 1932, the Polskie Zakłady Inżynieryjne (Polish Engineering Works, PZInż) started the production of Fiat 508, produced until 1939 also as a military vehicle. In 1936 the licence was extended to include the Fiat 518 model. In 1965, the Polish communist government signed a deal with Fiat to produce selected Fiat models in Poland at the FSO factory in Warsaw that had been built in 1951. Production of the new car—the Polski Fiat 125p—began in 1967. It was visually identical to the Fiat 125, but it made use of older Fiat mechanicals which dated back to 1960. The car sold well in its homeland and was soon exported to Western Europe. 1978 saw the appearance of a new five-door hatchback, the FSO Polonez, that made use of Fiat 125p running gear. After 1982, Fiat withdrew its licence; since then FSO badge was reinstated with the Polski Fiat 125p surviving until 1991, and the Polonez production ending in 2002. FSO was taken over by Daewoo of South Korea in 1995, and become independent again in late 2000, after Daewoo went bankrupt and was taken over by General Motors.

Fabryka Samochodów Małolitrażowych (FSM) in Bielsko-Biała and Tychy was a joint venture between FSO and Fiat, and manufactured the Fiat 126(p) in 1973 and the Cinquecento in 1991. In 1992 Fiat owned 90% of FSM (called Fiat Auto Poland, since 1993) and since then it produced Cinquecento, Uno, Seicento, Siena and Palio Weekend models with the capacity up to 200.000 cars a year. In 2003, FSM become the sole producer of Fiat Panda, and in 2007, the Fiat 500 and the related Ford Ka. Capacity was increased with production reaching over 600,000 in 2009, but dropped below 300,000 in 2013, resulting in the workforce being cut by a third.

=== Russia ===
In 1966 Fiat helped USSR state industries build a new car factory (AvtoVAZ) on the Volga river. A planned city called Tolyatti (named after Palmiro Togliatti, former Italian Communist Party Secretary) was developed around the factory, which started producing a "people's car" similar to the Volkswagen Beetle and Citroën 2CV of Germany and France. The new Soviet car, called the Lada, was a more spacious offering, in four-door saloon and five-door estate variants. Fiat installed British machine tools supplied by Herbert-BSA of Birmingham for the manufacture of many Lada parts. The 124's design was mechanically upgraded to survive treacherous Russian driving conditions and extremely cold winters. Imports to Western Europe, Canada, and some third world countries sold well owing to their low price. This car was upgraded to become the Lada Riva (marketing name in some markets) in 1980. Lada has gone on to develop some of its own models. The four-wheel drive Lada Niva uses some Fiat based components, e.g. engine and gearbox, but the body and four-wheel drive system are VAZ designs.

=== Bulgaria ===
1967–1971 produced Pirin-Fiat in Lovech, Bulgaria.

=== Turkey ===
TOFAŞ Türk Otomobil Fabrikası A.Ş. is joint venture owned by Fiat S.p.A. and Koç Holding A.Ş. (37.8% Fiat Group Automobiles S.p.A., 37.8% Koç Holding A.Ş. and 24.3% others). The Fiat 124 was produced under licence by TOFAŞ as the TOFAŞ Murat. This was replaced by a version of the Fiat 131, known as the TOFAŞ Şahin. Today the Fiat Egea car is among those manufactured by the Fiat-Tofas joint venture in Turkey, and the company has 12.1% of the Turkish car market as of 2007.

=== Spain ===
In Spain, SEAT S.A. was established with Fiat S.p.A. assistance in 1950, producing Fiat models under its own brand name until 1981, when Fiat withdrew its support. In 1982 SEAT signed a cooperation agreement with the German manufacturer Volkswagen AG and by the end of 1986 after a purchase of a majority stake SEAT had become part of the Volkswagen Group. However, production of some Fiat-based models continued, ending with the Fiat-based Marbella in 1998.

=== Ethiopia ===
The Fiat 131, known as the Holland Car Plc DOCC.

=== Egypt ===
Following the Egyptian Revolution of 1952, President Gamal Abdel Nasser ordered the EGID (General Intelligence Agent) to establish a state owned automobile company. El Nasr Automotive Manufacturing Company was founded in 1960 in Helwan, Egypt. It began producing some Fiat based models, but later produced the TOFAŞ Şahin under license by Tofaş. The last Fiat 128 model was built in 2008, while the Şahin is still in production in Egypt.

Currently the El-Mashreq Company, a part of the Seoudi Group is the main manufacturer of Alfa Romeo and Fiat vehicles for the Egyptian market. Arab American Vehicles (AAV) also manufactured Fiats in Egypt. They assembled the Fiat Ritmo at the behest of Nasr.

=== India ===
Fiat India Automobiles Private Limited is a joint venture between Fiat S.p.A. and Mumbai based Tata Motors Limited, founded in 1997. Fiat builds the Palio Stile, Linea and Punto. The Fiat plant is situated in Ranjangaon near Pune in Maharashtra and also manufactures the Tata Indica.

Although not a subsidiary of Fiat, Premier Automobiles Limited of Mumbai was licensed to manufacture versions of the Fiat 500 for the Indian market. This was followed by the Fiat 1100 in 1954. In 1973, the Fiat label was replaced with the Premier name. Premier built the Fiat 1100 and 124 into the 21st century; after a brief attempt at building the Uno in the early years of the 21st century, the companies severed their ties.

=== Pakistan ===
Raja Motors are the authorized manufacturers of Fiat motor vehicles in Pakistan since 1948. The manufacturing started with VESPA scooters in 1948. The project was expanded in 2001 to facilitate assembly-cum-manufacturing of the Fiat Uno. The production facility is located in Landhi Industrial Area, Karachi, Pakistan.

=== Sri Lanka ===
In 1973 entrepreneur Upali Wijewardene's Upali Motor Company began assembly of the local variant of Fiat 128, known as UMC-Fiat 128. Production ended with the introduction of the open-market economy in 1978.

=== North Korea ===
The North Korean car manufacturer and dealer Pyeonghwa Motors assembles two Fiat models under licence since 2002: Hwiparam (whistle)—based on the Fiat Siena, Bbeokgugi (owl)—based on the Fiat Doblò.

=== China ===
Fiat entered into a 50:50 joint venture with GAC Group in 2010 to create GAC Fiat Automobiles Co., Ltd., with a factory in Changsha completed in 2012 producing a localised version of the Dodge Dart sold as the Fiat Viaggio.

== See also ==
- Automotive industry
- Automotive industry crisis of 2008–2009
- List of aircraft engines
- List of Italian companies
- Neckar
- Simca
