= Fiat Chrysler Automobiles =

Automotive manufacturing conglomerate

Fiat Chrysler Automobiles N.V.
- Type: Public
- Traded as: BIT: FCA; NYSE: FCAU
- ISIN: NL0010877643
- Industry: Automotive
- Predecessors: Fiat Group; Chrysler Group
- Founded: October 12, 2014; 12 years ago
- Founder: Fiat Group; Chrysler Group
- Defunct: January 16, 2021; 5 years ago
- Fate: Merged with PSA Group into Stellantis
- Successor: Stellantis
- Headquarters: Amsterdam, Netherlands (legal office); London, United Kingdom (fiscal office)
- Area served: Worldwide
- Key people: John Elkann (chairman); Mike Manley (CEO)
- Products: Automobiles; commercial vehicles; Auto parts
- Revenue: ▼€108 billion (2019)
- Operating income: ▲€4 billion (2019)
- Net income: ▲€6.6 billion (2019)
- Total assets: ▲€96.87 billion (2018)
- Total equity: ▲€24.90 billion (2018)
- Owners: Exor (28.7%); Tiger Global (4.79%); UBS Securities (4.35%); Vanguard (1.93%)
- Number of employees: 198,545 (2018)
- Parent: Exor
- Subsidiaries: Companies: Vehicles; FCA Italy; Abarth; Alfa Romeo; Fiat; Fiat Professional; Lancia; FCA US; Chrysler; Dodge; Jeep; Ram; Maserati Components and production systems; Comau; Mopar; Teksid (84.8%)
- Website: www.fcagroup.com

Fiat Chrysler Automobiles N.V., commonly known by the acronym FCA, was an Italian-American multinational corporation primarily known as a manufacturer of automobiles, commercial vehicles, auto parts and production systems.

The corporation existed by January 2012, when Fiat Group acquired a 58.5% stake of the Chrysler Group (which from 1998 to 2007 was part of DaimlerChrysler) and thus became, at that time, the 7th largest automaker (behind Toyota, General Motors, Volkswagen, Hyundai, Ford and Nissan). Fiat Chrysler Automobiles (FCA) was then fully formed in October 2014, when the Fiat Group merged with the Chrysler Group after acquiring the US company's remaining 41.5% that January.

Its corporate headquarters were domiciled in Amsterdam and its financial headquarters were in London. The holding company was listed on the New York Stock Exchange and Milan's Borsa Italiana. Exor, an Italian investment group controlled by the Agnelli family, owned 29% of FCA and controlled 44% through a loyalty voting mechanism, the largest block of shares.

FCA's mass-market brands operated through two main subsidiaries: FCA Italy (previously Fiat Group Automobiles) with headquarters in Turin, and FCA US (previously Chrysler Group) in Auburn Hills, Michigan. The company's portfolio included brands Abarth, Alfa Romeo, Chrysler, Dodge, Fiat, Fiat Professional, Jeep, Lancia, Maserati, and Ram Trucks. Ferrari was spun off in 2016. FCA operated in four global markets (NAFTA, LATAM, APAC, EMEA).

Starting in late 2019, FCA merged with the PSA Group on a 50-50 all-stock basis in a $50 billion merger. In 2020, the company announced its new name, Stellantis. In January 2021, the merger was complete with FCA resulting as the surviving entity and changed its name to Stellantis.

FCA also owned industrial subsidiaries Comau, Mopar, Teksid and VM Motori.

== Corporate management ==
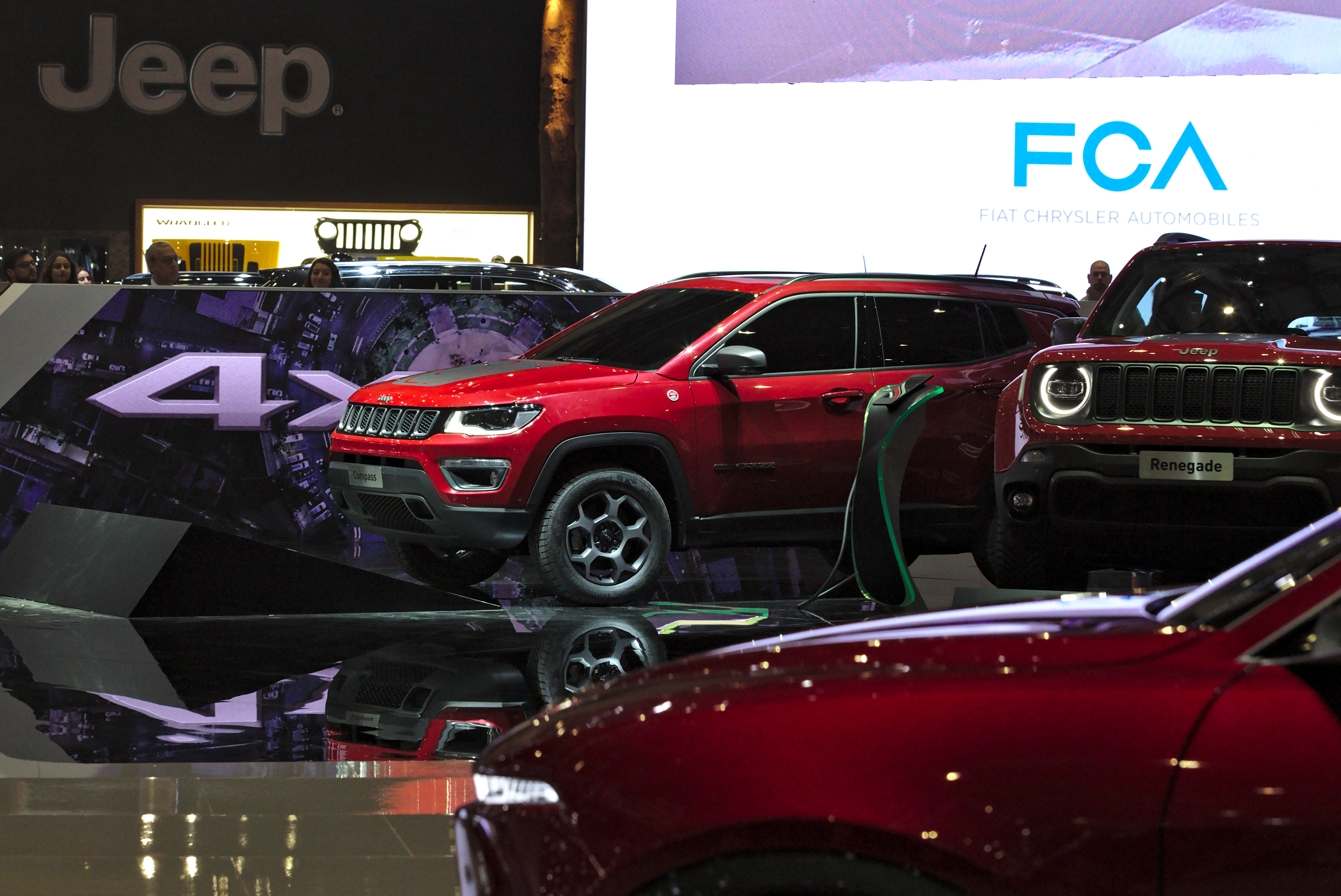
Press conference of FCA at the 2019 Geneva Motor Show

The executive management of the company was split between Michigan and Italy. The other operating activities of the new group remained unchanged, with manufacturing, design, and engineering facilities remaining in Turin, Michigan, and other locations worldwide.

Executive members of the FCA Board of Directors as of March 2019 were John Elkann (chairman) and Mike Manley (Chief Executive Officer), with non-executive directors Ronald L. Thompson, John Abbott, Andrea Agnelli, Tiberto Brandolini d'Adda, Glenn Earle, Valerie A. Mars, Ruth J. Simmons, Michelangelo A. Volpi, Patience Wheatcroft, and Ermenegildo Zegna, CEO of Ermenegildo Zegna.

== Subsidiaries ==
FCA carried out its mass-market automotive operations through two main subsidiaries: FCA Italy (previously Fiat Group Automobiles) and FCA US (previously Chrysler Group). The company announced both name changes in December 2014.

FCA Italy included the Italy-based brands Abarth, Alfa Romeo, Fiat, Fiat Professional, Lancia, and the engine manufacturing subsidiary VM Motori.

FCA US included the US-based brands Chrysler, Dodge, Jeep, and Ram, plus the Mopar service and parts organization.

Other companies included firms working on production automation (Comau) and a metal foundry (Teksid, 84.8% share). Other joint ventures and subsidiaries are undertaken via the FCA Italy and FCA US companies.

In early 2019, FCA sold auto-parts maker Magneti Marelli for €6.2 billion to Calsonic Kansei, a Japan-based company owned by American buyout firm KKR.

== History ==
=== Origins ===
The integration between Fiat Group and Chrysler Group dates back to 2009, after Chrysler Group filed for Chapter 11 bankruptcy reorganization on 30 April 2009. On 10 June 2009, Chrysler Group emerged from the bankruptcy proceedings with the United Auto Workers pension fund, Fiat, and the US and Canadian governments as principal owners. Fiat's initial purchase was a 20% stake; by January 2012, it grew to 58.5%. On 21 January 2014, Fiat Group completed the acquisition of the remaining 41.5% from the United Auto Workers, making Chrysler Group a wholly owned subsidiary. The total cost of acquisition was US$4.9 billion with an additional US$5.5 billion in pension liability.

Fiat Group and Chrysler Group merged into Fiat Chrysler Automobiles (FCA) on 12 October 2014 following approvals of the board on 15 June 2014 and shareholders on 1 August 2014. On 13 October 2014, Fiat Chrysler began trading on the BIT under the ticker symbol "FCA" and on the NYSE under the ticker symbol "FCAU".

On 15 December 2014 the Fiat Group Automobiles (FGA) subsidiary was renamed to FCA Italy, and Chrysler Group was renamed to FCA US; the name changes were announced to the press the following day.

Maserati and Ferrari were not put under the control of FCA. Maserati was a separate subsidiary of FCA, whereas Ferrari split from FCA in 2015.

=== Five-year plan (2014–2018) ===
On 6 May 2014, Fiat Chrysler Automobiles announced its 5-year business plan. The company expected that sales would increase to 7 million units, revenues to €132 billion, net income to €5 billion, and industrial debt would peak at €11 billion in 2015, and then reduce to €0.5-1 billion by end of 2018. The Group updated its business plan targets in January 2016 at the time it announced FY 2015.

Much of the global growth was focused around Jeep due to its high visibility globally as well as the growing worldwide SUV market. Chrysler would be re-positioned as the company's mainstream North American brand to compete with Ford, Chevrolet, Toyota, and Volkswagen, while Dodge would focus on performance-based vehicles. Alfa Romeo would become the company's premium marque to compete with BMW, Lexus, and Audi, while Maserati would be the company's ultra-luxury brand to compete with Mercedes-Benz, Bentley, Jaguar, Aston Martin, and Rolls-Royce. Fiat (which would remain the company's mainstream brand outside of North America) and Ram Trucks would remain largely unchanged while SRT was merged back into Dodge. Conspicuously absent in the announcement was Lancia, which was later confirmed to be withdrawing from all markets outside Italy.

=== New vehicle models ===
In 2014, Alfa Romeo launched the 4C and 4C Spider in North America. In 2015, the company announced the Giulia and in 2016 it added an SUV, Stelvio. It dropped the 4C from the lineup in 2019. FCA announced a mid-cycle refresh for both the Giulia and Stelvio for production year 2021.

In 2014, Chrysler released a refreshed 300/300C. In 2016, the brand launched the Pacifica as the successor to the Town & Country.

The first announcement was that the SRT brand was to rejoin Dodge. In 2015, a refreshed Charger and Challenger (with equivalent SRT versions) launched. The company also introduced SRT Hellcat versions of the Charger and Challenger. FCA also announced that 2014 would be the last model year for the Dodge Avenger. In 2018 with a refreshed Dodge Durango launched along with (an SRT version). In 2018, it launched a Challenger (and SRT version) and Charger (and SRT version) models.

In April 2017, Dodge introduced the 2018 Dodge Demon. It had a 6.2L V8 HEMI mated to a 2.7L supercharger, which produced 840 horsepower and 770 lb-ft of torque at the crank—and made the Dodge Demon the world's quickest production vehicle at the time. The Demon's excessive torque caused the front axle to lift off of the ground during launch. It was also equipped with many other industry-first features including a Transbrake, launch control systems, 5-point harness occupant restraints, and an HVAC system that produces additional horsepower by further cooling intake air.

In 2015, Fiat launched the new Fiat 500X (produced in Melfi, Italy) and the Fiat Egea (produced in Turkey by jv partner Tofas and sold in Europe under the Fiat Tipo nameplate and Mexico as the Dodge Neon).

Lancia is a historic brand of Italian luxury and performance cars. With the discontinuation of the Lancia-badged Chrysler 300 and Voyager in the European market in 2015, the Ypsilon is the only model currently in production and is marketed solely in Italy.

In 2014, the Maserati GranTurismo and GranCabrio were believed to be the end of the nameplate. In 2016, the company launched the new Maserati Levante SUV. In 2018, it added a new GranTurismo with a 560-horsepower V8 and rear-wheel drive. Between 2014 and 2018, the top-of-the-line Maserati Quattroporte GTS received a 560-horsepower V8 with an all-wheel drive to replace the 523-horsepower V8 with rear-wheel drive in the GTS model. The top-of-the-line Ghiblis and Levantes received the same setup as the Quattroporte. In 2020, the company added the Maserati Alfieri. The car was scheduled for release in 2016 but was postponed to allow the Levante in 2016. In 2021, a convertible variant of the Alfieri is expected. The top-of-the-line Alfieri will receive a 520-horsepower V6 with all-wheel drive.

In 2014, Jeep launched the Jeep Renegade. After a long absence Jeep returned to Malaysia, where DRB-HICOM distributes the brand's vehicles. In 2015, Jeep refreshed the Jeep Grand Cherokee with celebrities Fan Bingbing, Tina Fey, Sandra Bullock, Julia Roberts, and Cate Blanchett promoted as brand ambassadors. Jeep marked its 75th anniversary in 2016. The Jeep Compass and Jeep Patriot appeared in their last model year while a refreshed Jeep Cherokee was released. In 2017, Jeep refreshed the Jeep Renegade followed by the updated Jeep Wrangler and Jeep Grand Cherokee in 2018. In 2021, Jeep launched a luxury Jeep Grand Wagoneer to compete with the likes of Mercedes-Benz G-Class and Range Rover, Cadillac Escalade, and Lincoln Navigator. Jeep also launched the Wagoneer to compete with the likes of the Ford Expedition, Chevrolet Suburban, and GMC Yukon.

In 2014, Ram launched the ProMaster van and the smaller ProMaster City, derived from the Fiat Ducato and Doblò respectively. In 2017, the division launched a new Ram 1500 and a refreshed commercial light-duty truck. It followed in 2018 with a new Ram HD, commercial heavy-duty truck, and Ram chassis cab.

=== 2015–2018 ===
FCA chief executive Sergio Marchionne and Dennis Williams, President of the United Auto Workers (UAW), entered into contract negotiations on 14 July 2015. As negotiations between the UAW and US automakers began, Marchionne leaned in to embrace Williams in a hug seen "round the world," shocking some union members. When Marchionne made the announcement on 8 January 2017 of plans to add 2,000 jobs and invest $1 billion in plants by 2020, Marchionne credited the decision to the negotiations with Williams that began in 2015.

On 13 January 2017, the company came under investigation by the US Justice Department due to allegedly failing to disclose software that violated emissions standards and allowed vehicles to exceed pollution limits. On 23 May 2017, the Justice Department filed a civil lawsuit alleging that FCA "used a 'defeat device' to circumvent emission controls" in more than 100,000 vehicles between 2014 and 2016.

On 29 October 2014, the group announced the intention to separate Ferrari from FCA. The transaction completed on 3 January 2016. In January 2016, Ferrari became a separate investment of Exor, siding with FCA and CNH, after FCA listed 10% of the company on the NYSE in October 2015 and distributed its remaining 80% stake in Ferrari to FCA shareholders. Ferrari now trades on the NYSE under the ticker symbol "RACE".

FCA also operated in print media and advertising through its Italiana Editrice subsidiary (publisher of the Italian La Stampa and Il Secolo XIX newspapers) and interest in RCS MediaGroup.

In March 2017, FCA was a stakeholder in the creation of Italy's largest media group GEDI Gruppo Editoriale, created by the merger of Gruppo Editoriale L'Espresso publishing L'espresso and La Repubblica with Italiana Editrice (ITEDI), of which FCA held 77% of the shares and which publishes the Torino daily La Stampa and Il Secolo XIX. Subsequently, FCA divested from publishing by distributing its shares to its own shareholders, again mainly Exor, so to concentrate on the automobile business. Exor sold its shares in GEDI immediately after receiving them.

On 21 July 2018, FCA suddenly replaced chief executive Marchionne in all of his positions at FCA, Ferrari, SGS, and CNH following emergency meetings of each respective company's board of directors. Marchionne last appeared in public on 26 June where he appeared quite lethargic and fatigued. FCA stated on 5 July that he had taken medical leave to undergo surgery to his right shoulder and on the day of his replacement stated that he would not be able to return to work due to post-surgical complications. It was later reported that his health had deteriorated "suddenly and sharply" and that Marchionne had lapsed into a coma. Sergio Marchionne died on 25 July 2018, aged 66.

=== After Marchionne ===
In July 2018, Fiat Chrysler Automobiles' European chief Alfredo Altavilla resigned after being passed over to replace Marchionne.

In January 2019, FCA agreed to pay $800 million to settle lawsuits related to diesel emissions after the company was found to have installed software to produce false results on diesel emissions tests. In July 2020, authorities from Germany, Italy and Switzerland raided the offices of Fiat Chrysler Automobiles as part of the investigation over the use of defeat devices in emissions testing. Additionally FCA is facing a £5 billion class-action lawsuit in the United Kingdom in relation to allegations of diesel emissions manipulation in select Alfa Romeo, Fiat, Iveco, and Jeep models.

In February 2019, FCA announced plans to invest $4.5 billion in manufacturing in Michigan. The plant is estimated to create nearly 6,500 jobs. Plans include $1.6 billion to build a Jeep factory in Detroit.

In May 2019, FCA proposed merging its business with Renault but it was later withdrawn.

In March 2020, the Detroit United Auto Workers union announced that after discussion with the leaders of General Motors, Ford, and Fiat Chrysler Automobiles, the carmakers would partially shut down factories on a "rotating" basis to mitigate the COVID-19 pandemic. In April 2020, the company released several advertisements designed to discourage people from using their products during the pandemic.

=== Merger with the PSA Group ===
On 31 October 2019, Fiat Chrysler Automobiles announced its intent to merge with the French automaker PSA Group. The merger would be on a 50-50 all-stock basis. On 18 December 2019, FCA and PSA announced that they had agreed to the binding terms for the $50 billion merger. On 15 July 2020, both companies announced that the corporate name of the new group would be Stellantis. The new group will be incorporated in the Netherlands with Carlos Tavares as CEO. On 4 January 2021, both shareholders of FCA and PSA approved the merger and it ceased operation on 16 January 2021.

== Logo ==
The FCA logo, which comprises stylised blue letters resembling FCA, was created by the Italian branding company Robilant Associati, ending the use of the Fiat logo and Chrysler Pentastar logo for group branding.

== See also ==
- List of manufacturers by motor vehicle production
