= European Battery Alliance =

EU support network for European battery manufacturers

- Built: October 2017
- Location: Europe
- Industry: Automotive
- Products: Electric vehicle, Vehicle parts, Lithium-ion batteries
- Owner: EU

The European Battery Alliance (EBA) is Europe's plan to create its own competitive and sustainable battery cell manufacturing value chain. Its purpose is to ensure that Europe benefits from the technological evolution in the Electric Vehicle Market and beyond. The action plan includes cleaner and more sustainable vehicles as well as safer traffic operations across Europe.

== Stakeholders ==
120 industrial innovation stakeholders are currently active under the EBA alliance in partnership with participant EU states and the European Investment Bank. This entails growth and investment potential of the battery sector across Europe and beyond.

== Operations ==
The action plan adopted focuses on innovating and developing a sustainable and competitive battery 'ecosystem' within Europe. The primary objective is to create a manufacturing value chain with sustainable battery cells at its core in order to avoid a technological dependence from 3rd parties. According to analysts, by 2025, Europe could capture a €250 billion market. EU-wide demand is forecast to require 10 to 20 large-scale battery cell production facilities. The first planned plant, called the "Automotive Cell Co.", will be stationed at a Groupe PSA’s site in Kaiserslautern. Saft Groupe S.A. will be taking part in the operations as this plant will be complementing another production facility located at Hauts-de-France. The two plants are to be operational by 2024, employ around 2,000 and serve up to 15% of Europe's demand.

== Environmental impact ==
The European Union and all stakeholders involved are considering the entire life-cycle of batteries, including the environmental gains of use and the impact triggered by their production. Recycling and the recovery of materials at the end of the life cycle reduce the impact of both mining and manufacturing. CO_{2} emissions and hazardous substances used are lowered and the impact of mining is reduced. The EU wants to ensure recycling through the Battery Directive to offset the negative side of the equation.

== Economic impact ==
The European Commission sees batteries as a core component of the current industrial revolution. It sees the development and production of this technology as having a strategic commercial role in the transition to clean mobility and clean energy systems. Bernstein Research stated that developing European cell capacity could cost as much as $30bn (€25bn).

== History ==
EBA was launched in October 2017 by Vice President Maroš Šefčovič.

On 30 September 2020, the EU launched its European Raw Materials Alliance (ERMA). It is aiming for strategic autonomy on critical raw materials. It is modelled on the European Battery Alliance and focuses on metals and rare earths which are used to build magnets for batteries and all kinds of electric and electronic devices. Part of its objectives is to allow the EU to become "almost" self-sufficient on lithium for batteries by 2025.
