= Stellantis Europe =

Italian regional subsidiary of Stellantis

Stellantis Europe S.p.A.

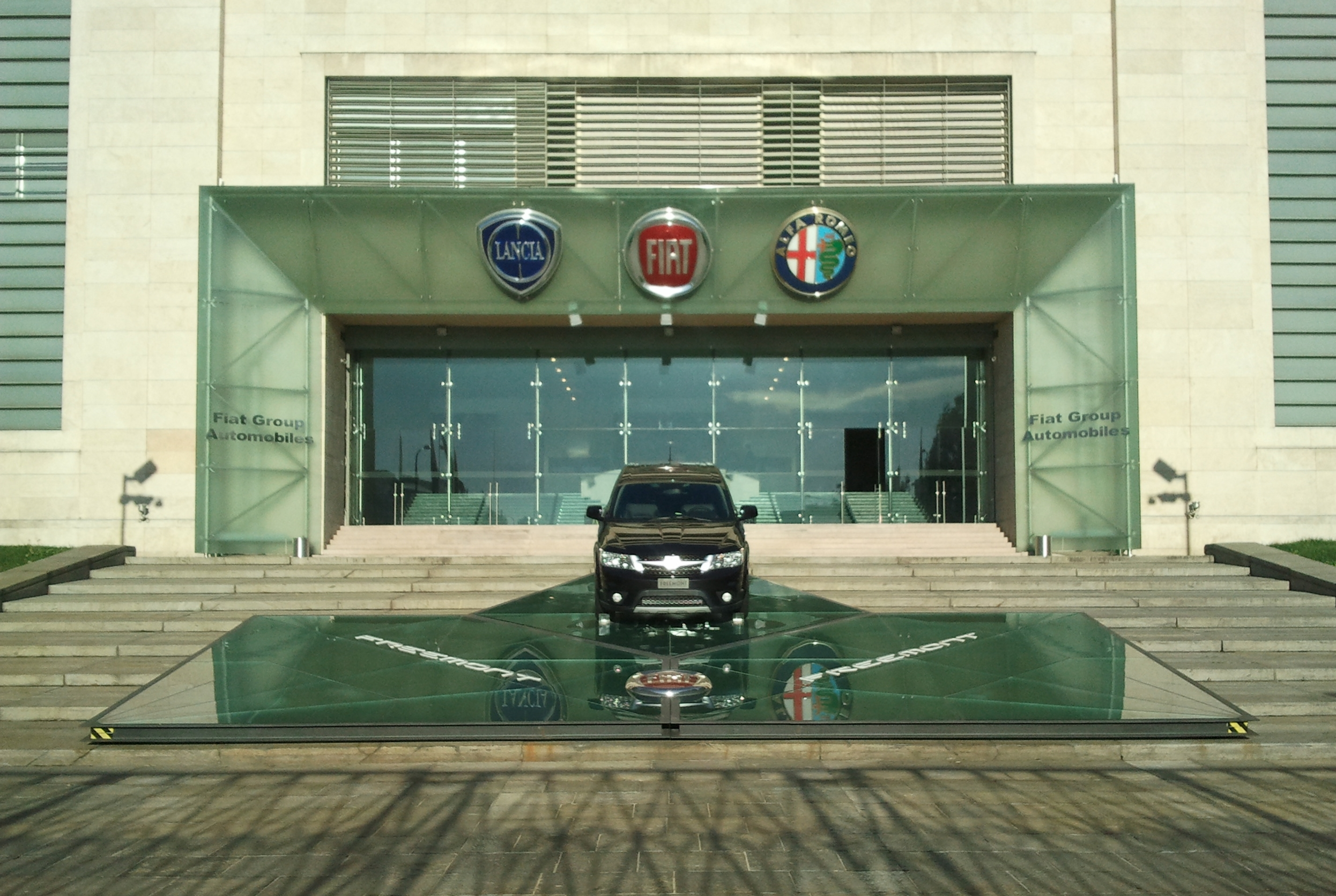
- Fiat Mirafiori in Turin, Italy
- Formerly: Fiat Group Automobiles S.p.A. (2007–2014); FCA Italy S.p.A. (2014–2023)
- Type: Subsidiary
- Industry: Automotive
- Predecessor: Fiat Auto
- Founded: 1 February 2007; 19 years ago
- Founder: Fiat Group
- Headquarters: Turin, Italy
- Area served: Worldwide
- Key people: Maxime Picat (COO, Enlarged Europe)
- Products: Cars; Commercial vehicles; Auto parts
- Parent: Stellantis
- Subsidiaries: Abarth; Alfa Romeo; Fiat; Fiat Professional; Heritage; Lancia
- Website: media.stellantis.com

Stellantis Europe S.p.A. (formerly Fiat Group Automobiles S.p.A. and FCA Italy S.p.A.) is the Italian subsidiary of the multinational automaker Stellantis, dedicated to the production and selling of passenger cars and light commercial vehicles and headquartered in Turin, Italy.

Founded in 2007 by Fiat Group, from 2014 it was a subsidiary of Fiat Chrysler Automobiles, which in 2021 merged into Stellantis.

== History ==
The company was founded as Fiat Group Automobiles (FGA) in 2007 to replace Fiat Auto.

In 2014, it became part of Fiat Chrysler Automobiles (FCA) and renamed to FCA Italy.

In 2021, Groupe PSA and FCA merged to form Stellantis.

FCA Italy was renamed Stellantis Europe in 2023.

== Marques ==
- Abarth
- Alfa Romeo
- Fiat
- Fiat Professional
- Lancia
