= List of countries by motor vehicle production =

This is a list of countries by motor vehicle production based on International Organization of Motor Vehicle Manufacturers and other data from 2016 and earlier. Figures include passenger cars, light commercial vehicles, minibuses, trucks, buses and coaches.

== 2020s and peak ==
| Country | 2025 | 2024 | 2023 | 2022 | 2021 | 2020 | Peak | |
| Country | 2025 | 2024 | 2023 | 2022 | 2021 | 2020 | Production | Year |
|---|---|---|---|---|---|---|---|---|
| World | 96,383,650 | 92,504,338 | 93,546,599 | 85,016,728 | 80,145,988 | 77,621,582 | 97,302,534 | 2017 |
| China | 34,530,738 | 31,281,592 | 30,160,966 | 27,020,615 | 26,082,220 | 25,225,242 | 34,778,000 | 2025 |
| United States | 10,243,844 | 10,562,188 | 10,611,555 | 10,060,339 | 9,167,214 | 8,822,399 | 13,024,978 | 1999 |
| Japan | 8,410,232 | 8,234,681 | 8,997,440 | 7,835,519 | 7,846,955 | 8,067,557 | 13,486,796 | 1990 |
| India | 6,490,810 | 6,014,691 | 5,851,507 | 5,456,857 | 4,399,112 | 3,490,000 | 6,490,810 | 2025 |
| Germany | 4,148,836 | 4,069,222 | 4,109,371 | 3,677,820 | 3,308,692 | 3,742,454 | 6,213,460 | 2007 |
| South Korea | 4,102,200 | 4,127,252 | 4,244,000 | 3,757,049 | 3,462,404 | 3,506,774 | 4,657,094 | 2011 |
| Mexico | 4,092,448 | 4,202,642 | 4,002,047 | 3,509,072 | 3,145,653 | 3,176,600 | 4,664,779 | 2013 |
| Brazil | 2,644,054 | 2,549,595 | 2,324,838 | 2,369,769 | 2,248,253 | 2,014,055 | 3,712,380 | 2013 |
| Spain | 2,274,026 | 2,376,504 | 2,451,221 | 2,219,462 | 2,098,133 | 2,268,185 | 3,032,874 | 2000 |
| France | 1,463,991 | 1,357,701 | 1,505,079 | 1,383,173 | 1,351,308 | 1,316,371 | 3,919,776 | 1989 |
| Thailand | 1,455,569 | 1,468,997 | 1,841,663 | 1,883,515 | 1,685,705 | 1,427,074 | 2,457,057 | 2013 |
| Czech Republic | 1,452,776 | 1,458,892 | 1,404,501 | 1,224,456 | 1,111,432 | 1,159,151 | 1,458,892 | 2024 |
| Turkey | 1,419,464 | 1,365,296 | 1,468,393 | 1,352,648 | 1,276,140 | 1,297,878 | 1,695,731 | 2017 |
| Canada | 1,237,075 | 1,339,288 | 1,553,758 | 1,233,360 | 1,115,002 | 1,376,623 | 2,961,636 | 2000 |
| Indonesia | 1,147,600 | 1,196,664 | 1,395,717 | 1,470,146 | 1,121,987 | 691,286 | 1,470,146 | 2022 |
| Slovakia | 1,070,000 | 993,000 | 1,080,000 | 1,000,000 | 1,000,000 | 990,598 | 1,107,902 | 2019 |
| Iran | 915,210 | 1,077,839 | 1,188,471 | 1,064,215 | 894,298 | 880,997 | 1,649,311 | 2011 |
| Russia | 853,897 | 982,665 | 729,864 | 608,060 | 1,566,317 | 1,435,335 | 2,233,103 | 2012 |
| United Kingdom | 764,715 | 905,233 | 1,025,474 | 876,614 | 932,488 | 987,044 | 2,332,376 | 1963 |
| Malaysia | 747,780 | 790,347 | 774,600 | 702,225 | 481,651 | 485,186 | 790,347 | 2024 |
| Poland | 628,276 | 555,346 | 612,882 | 483,840 | 439,421 | 451,382 | 950,908 | 2008 |
| South Africa | 618,077 | 599,755 | 633,337 | 555,889 | 499,087 | 447,218 | 633,337 | 2023 |
| Romania | 545,510 | 560,102 | 513,050 | 509,465 | 420,755 | 438,107 | 560,102 | 2024 |
| Morocco | 501,965 | 559,645 | 535,825 | 464,864 | 403,007 | 248,430 | 559,645 | 2024 |
| Argentina | 490,876 | 506,571 | 610,725 | 536,893 | 434,753 | 257,187 | 828,771 | 2011 |
| Italy | 474,044 | 591,067 | 880,085 | 796,324 | 795,856 | 777,165 | 2,220,774 | 1989 |
| Uzbekistan | 462,343 | 429,364 | 425,876 | 333,569 | 241,649 | 280,080 | 462,343 | 2025 |
| Hungary | 411,776 | 437,045 | 507,225 | 441,729 | 394,302 | 406,497 | 507,225 | 2023 |
| Portugal | 341,361 | 332,546 | 318,231 | 322,404 | 289,954 | 264,236 | 345,704 | 2019 |
| Taiwan | | 275,156 | 285,962 | 261,263 | 265,320 | 245,615 | 446,345 | 2005 |
| Belgium | 253,418 | 240,366 | 332,103 | 276,554 | 261,038 | 267,293 | 1,248,290 | 1990 |
| Sweden | 251,659 | 268,487 | 276,750 | 238,955 | 257,446 | 258,000 | 494,000 | 1999 |
| Pakistan | 190,082 | 128,449 | 79,513 | 235,454 | 238,702 | 117,375 | 269,700 | 2016 |
| Vietnam | | 175,661 | 177,435 | 232,410 | 163,250 | 165,568 | 250,000 | 2019 |
| Kazakhstan | 170,582 | 144,624 | 146,989 | 112,540 | 92,417 | 74,831 | 170,582 | 2025 |
| Philippines | | 126,571 | 110,350 | 92,223 | 85,874 | 67,297 | 213,402 | 2007 |
| Egypt | 89,570 | – | – | – | 23,754 | 23,754 | 123,425 | 2005 |
| Austria | 70,900 | 71,785 | 114,191 | 107,500 | 136,700 | 104,544 | 274,932 | 2006 |
| Slovenia | 61,431 | 60,903 | 60,881 | 68,130 | 95,797 | 141,714 | 212,749 | 2009 |
| Serbia | 51,417 | 235 | 186 | 4,498 | 21,263 | 23,375 | 51,417 | 2025 |
| Algeria | 43,052 | 30,108 | 2,456 | 2,773 | 5,208 | 754 | 70,597 | 2018 |
| Colombia | 34,546 | 23,778 | 34,700 | 51,455 | 40,764 | 47,281 | 109,333 | 2010 |
| Belarus | | – | – | – | 29,891 | 31,273 | 40,100 | 1980 |
| Finland | | 22,384 | 30,191 | 73,044 | 93,172 | 86,270 | 114,785 | 2019 |
| Netherlands | | 7,403 | 123,379 | 101,670 | 107,021 | 127,058 | 307,220 | 1999 |
| Australia | | 7,238 | 7,141 | 6,077 | 5,391 | 4,730 | 498,000 | 1974 |
| Azerbaijan | 4,309 | 6,815 | 5,110 | 3,050 | 3,870 | 1,949 | 6,815 | 2024 |
| Myanmar | | 2,711 | 1,475 | – | 1,957 | 10,753 | 15,496 | 2019 |
| Ecuador | | 2,700 | – | – | – | – | 41,047 | 2000 |
| North Korea | | – | – | 2,000 | 2,000 | 2,000 | – | – |
| Ukraine | | – | 1,993 | 1,490 | 8,153 | 4,952 | 423,127 | 2008 |
| Bangladesh | | 24 | – | – | – | – | 580 | 2017 |
| Venezuela | | – | – | – | – | – | 175,458 | 2006 |
| New Zealand | | – | – | – | – | – | 123,000 | 1982 |
| Ireland | | – | – | – | – | – | 47,000 | 1981 |
| Bulgaria | | – | – | – | – | – | 21,000 | 1990 |
| Greece | | – | – | – | – | – | 20,593 | 1985 |
| Chile | | – | – | – | – | – | 10,804 | 2007 |
| Soviet Union | These are former countries. | | | | | | 2,247,500 | 1985 |
| Yugoslavia | These are former countries. | | | | | | 318,300 | 1988 |
| East Germany | These are former countries. | | | | | | 264,444 | 1986 |
| Czechoslovakia | These are former countries. | | | | | | 242,000 | 1990 |

== 2015–2020 ==
| Country | 2020 | 2019 | 2018 | 2017 | 2016 | 2015 |
|---|---|---|---|---|---|---|
| World | 77,621,582 | 91,786,861 | 95,634,593 | 97,302,534 | 95,057,929 | 90,780,583 |
| China | 25,225,242 | 25,720,665 | 27,809,196 | 29,015,434 | 28,118,794 | 24,503,326 |
| United States | 8,822,399 | 10,880,019 | 11,314,705 | 11,189,985 | 12,198,137 | 12,100,095 |
| Japan | 8,067,557 | 9,684,298 | 9,728,528 | 9,693,746 | 9,204,590 | 9,278,321 |
| India | 3,490,000 | 4,516,017 | 5,174,645 | 4,782,896 | 4,519,341 | 4,160,585 |
| Mexico | 3,176,600 | 3,986,794 | 4,100,770 | 4,137,544 | 4,396,356 | 4,029,463 |
| South Korea | 3,506,774 | 3,950,617 | 4,028,834 | 4,134,913 | 4,228,509 | 4,555,957 |
| Germany | 3,742,454 | 4,661,328 | 5,120,409 | 5,645,581 | 5,746,808 | 6,033,164 |
| Brazil | 2,014,055 | 2,944,988 | 2,879,809 | 2,699,672 | 2,156,356 | 2,429,463 |
| Spain | 2,268,185 | 2,822,355 | 2,819,565 | 2,848,335 | 2,885,922 | 2,733,201 |
| Thailand | 1,427,074 | 2,013,710 | 2,167,694 | 1,988,823 | 1,944,417 | 1,915,420 |
| Czech Republic | 1,159,151 | 1,433,963 | 1,442,884 | 1,419,993 | 1,349,896 | 1,303,603 |
| Iran | 1,297,878 | 1,461,244 | 1,550,150 | 1,695,731 | 1,485,927 | 1,358,796 |
| Canada | 1,376,623 | 1,916,585 | 2,020,840 | 2,199,789 | 2,370,271 | 2,283,474 |
| Indonesia | 691,286 | 1,286,848 | 1,343,714 | 1,216,615 | 1,177,389 | 1,098,780 |
| Turkey | 880,997 | 821,060 | 1,095,526 | 1,515,396 | 1,164,710 | 982,337 |
| Slovakia | 990,598 | 1,107,902 | 1,090,000 | 1,001,520 | 1,040,000 | 1,035,503 |
| Russia | 1,435,335 | 1,719,784 | 1,767,674 | 1,551,293 | 1,303,989 | 1,384,399 |
| France | 1,316,371 | 2,202,460 | 2,270,000 | 2,227,000 | 2,082,000 | 1,972,000 |
| United Kingdom | 987,044 | 1,381,405 | 1,604,328 | 1,749,385 | 1,816,622 | 1,682,156 |
| Malaysia | 485,186 | 571,632 | 564,800 | 460,140 | 513,445 | 614,671 |
| South Africa | 447,218 | 631,983 | 610,854 | 589,951 | 599,004 | 615,658 |
| Italy | 777,165 | 915,305 | 1,060,068 | 1,142,210 | 1,103,516 | 1,014,223 |
| Romania | 438,107 | 490,412 | 476,769 | 359,250 | 359,306 | 387,177 |
| Morocco | 248,430 | 394,652 | 402,085 | 376,286 | 345,106 | 288,329 |
| Poland | 451,382 | 498,158 | 809,646 | 789,729 | 781,837 | 760,603 |
| Argentina | 257,187 | 314,787 | 466,649 | 472,158 | 472,776 | 533,683 |
| Hungary | 406,497 | 498,158 | 430,988 | 505,400 | 472,000 | 495,370 |
| Uzbekistan | 280,080 | 271,113 | 220,667 | 140,247 | 88,152 | 185,400 |
| Portugal | 264,236 | 345,704 | 294,366 | 175,544 | 143,096 | 156,626 |
| Taiwan | 245,615 | 251,304 | 253,241 | 291,563 | 309,531 | 351,085 |
| Sweden | 258,000 | 249,000 | 279,000 | 291,000 | 226,000 | 205,374 |
| Belgium | 267,293 | 285,797 | 308,493 | 379,140 | 399,427 | 409,340 |
| Vietnam | 165,568 | 250,000 | 237,000 | 236,161 | 236,161 | 50,000 |
| Kazakhstan | 74,831 | 49,400 | 31,545 | 19,071 | 10,651 | 14,477 |
| Pakistan | 117,375 | 186,751 | 269,700 | 250,800 | 214,650 | 229,686 |
| Philippines | 67,297 | 95,094 | 79,763 | 141,251 | 116,686 | 112,493 |
| Austria | 104,544 | 179,400 | 164,900 | 99,880 | 108,000 | 125,500 |
| Slovenia | 141,714 | 199,102 | 209,378 | 189,852 | 133,702 | 133,092 |
| Algeria | 754 | 60,012 | 70,597 | 60,606 | 42,008 | 19,346 |
| Belarus | 31,273 | 30,487 | 23,235 | 13,428 | 16,864 | 15,033 |
| Colombia | 47,281 | 78,020 | 75,476 | 74,994 | 79,036 | 78,070 |
| Egypt | 23,754 | 18,500 | 71,600 | 36,640 | 36,230 | 36,000 |
| Finland | 86,270 | 114,785 | 112,104 | 91,598 | 55,280 | 69,053 |
| Netherlands | 127,058 | 176,113 | 214,000 | 157,280 | 44,430 | 44,122 |
| Australia | 4,730 | 5,606 | 6,371 | 98,632 | 161,294 | 173,009 |
| Azerbaijan | 1,949 | 3,014 | 1,453 | ? | 850 | 2,145 |
| Myanmar | 10,753 | 15,496 | – | – | – | – |
| Ecuador | – | – | 2,700 | 2,700 | 4,800 | 5,986 |
| North Korea | 2,000 | 2,000 | 3,000 | 3,000 | 4,000 | 4,000 |
| Tunisia | – | – | 2,000 | 1,940 | 1,940 | 540 |
| Ukraine | 4,952 | 7,266 | 6,623 | 9,542 | 5,264 | 8,244 |
| Venezuela | – | – | 1,774 | 2,850 | 18,300 | 19,759 |
| Serbia | 23,375 | 35,115 | 56,449 | 79,912 | 80,320 | 83,630 |
| Bangladesh | – | – | 580 | 580 | 540 | 536 |

== 2000–2015 ==
| Country | 2015 | 2014 | 2013 | 2012 | 2011 | 2010 | 2005 | 2000 |
|---|---|---|---|---|---|---|---|---|
| World | 90,780,583 | 89,747,430 | 87,507,027 | 84,141,209 | 80,092,840 | 77,629,127 | 66,482,439 | 58,374,162 |
| China | 24,503,326 | 23,722,890 | 22,116,825 | 19,271,808 | 18,418,876 | 18,264,761 | 5,717,619 | 2,069,069 |
| United States | 12,100,095 | 11,660,699 | 11,066,432 | 10,335,765 | 8,661,535 | 7,743,093 | 11,946,653 | 12,799,857 |
| Japan | 9,278,321 | 9,774,558 | 9,630,181 | 9,943,077 | 8,398,630 | 9,628,920 | 10,799,659 | 10,140,796 |
| India | 4,160,585 | 3,840,160 | 3,898,425 | 4,174,713 | 3,927,411 | 3,557,073 | 1,638,674 | 801,360 |
| Mexico | 4,029,463 | 4,664,779 | 4,219,380 | 4,002,508 | 3,907,861 | 3,981,728 | 3,583,076 | 3,099,522 |
| South Korea | 4,555,957 | 4,524,932 | 4,521,429 | 4,561,766 | 4,657,094 | 4,271,741 | 3,699,350 | 3,114,998 |
| Germany | 6,033,164 | 5,907,548 | 5,718,222 | 5,649,260 | 6,146,948 | 5,905,985 | 5,757,710 | 5,526,615 |
| Brazil | 2,429,463 | 3,146,306 | 3,712,380 | 3,402,508 | 3,407,861 | 3,381,728 | 2,530,840 | 1,681,527 |
| Spain | 2,733,201 | 2,402,978 | 2,163,338 | 1,979,179 | 2,373,329 | 2,387,900 | 2,752,500 | 3,032,874 |
| Thailand | 1,915,420 | 1,880,007 | 2,457,057 | 2,429,142 | 1,457,798 | 1,644,513 | 1,122,712 | 411,721 |
| Czech Republic | 1,303,603 | 1,251,220 | 1,132,931 | 1,178,995 | 1,199,845 | 1,076,384 | 602,237 | 455,492 |
| Iran | 1,358,796 | 1,170,445 | 1,125,534 | 1,072,978 | 1,189,131 | 1,094,557 | 879,452 | 430,947 |
| Canada | 2,283,474 | 2,393,890 | 2,379,806 | 2,463,364 | 2,135,121 | 2,068,189 | 2,687,892 | 2,961,636 |
| Indonesia | 1,098,780 | 1,298,523 | 1,206,368 | 1,052,895 | 838,388 | 702,508 | 500,710 | 379,300 |
| Turkey | 982,337 | 1,090,846 | 743,647 | 1,000,089 | 1,649,311 | 1,599,454 | 1,077,190 | 277,985 |
| Slovakia | 1,035,503 | 993,000 | 975,000 | 926,555 | 639,763 | 561,933 | 218,349 | 181,783 |
| Russia | 1,384,399 | 1,886,646 | 2,184,266 | 2,233,103 | 1,990,155 | 1,403,244 | 1,354,504 | 1,205,581 |
| France | 1,972,000 | 1,817,000 | 1,740,000 | 1,967,765 | 2,242,928 | 2,229,421 | 3,549,008 | 3,348,361 |
| United Kingdom | 1,682,156 | 1,598,879 | 1,597,433 | 1,576,945 | 1,463,999 | 1,393,463 | 1,803,109 | 1,813,894 |
| Malaysia | 614,671 | 596,600 | 601,407 | 572,150 | 533,695 | 567,715 | 563,408 | 282,830 |
| South Africa | 615,658 | 566,083 | 545,913 | 539,424 | 532,545 | 472,049 | 525,227 | 345,297 |
| Italy | 1,014,223 | 697,864 | 658,206 | 671,768 | 790,348 | 838,186 | 1,038,352 | 1,738,315 |
| Romania | 387,177 | 391,422 | 410,997 | 337,765 | 335,232 | 350,912 | 194,802 | 78,165 |
| Morocco | 288,329 | 231,986 | 167,452 | 108,743 | 59,477 | 42,066 | 33,992 | 31,314 |
| Poland | 760,603 | 693,904 | 690,159 | 654,756 | 708,133 | 609,474 | 543,200 | 404,972 |
| Argentina | 533,683 | 617,329 | 791,007 | 764,495 | 828,771 | 716,540 | 319,755 | 339,632 |
| Hungary | 495,370 | 437,599 | 222,400 | 217,840 | 202,800 | 211,461 | 152,015 | 137,398 |
| Uzbekistan | 185,400 | 245,660 | 246,641 | 164,180 | 179,560 | 156,880 | 94,437 | 32,273 |
| Portugal | 156,626 | 161,509 | 154,016 | 163,561 | 192,242 | 158,723 | 226,834 | 245,784 |
| Taiwan | 351,085 | 379,223 | 338,720 | 339,038 | 343,296 | 303,456 | 446,345 | 361,800 |
| Sweden | 205,374 | 188,987 | 154,173 | 161,080 | 162,814 | 188,969 | 217,084 | 339,229 |
| Belgium | 409,340 | 516,832 | 503,504 | 538,848 | 595,084 | 555,302 | 926,515 | 1,033,294 |
| Vietnam | 50,000 | 48,871 | 37,576 | 40,470 | 31,181 | 42,286 | 31,600 | 6,862 |
| Kazakhstan | 14,477 | 40,162 | 40,684 | 19,186 | 8,195 | 3,176 | – | – |
| Pakistan | 229,686 | 148,746 | 134,145 | 165,700 | 162,194 | 152,970 | 153,393 | 31,500 |
| Philippines | 112,493 | 106,938 | 52,260 | 55,360 | 53,921 | 65,625 | 64,492 | 38,877 |
| Austria | 125,500 | 154,340 | 166,428 | 143,060 | 152,505 | 104,814 | 253,279 | 141,026 |
| Slovenia | 133,092 | 118,591 | 93,734 | 130,949 | 174,119 | 205,711 | 187,247 | 98,953 |
| Algeria | 19,346 | 1,244 | – | – | – | – | – | – |
| Belarus | 15,033 | 22,990 | 22,926 | 25,425 | 24,343 | 15,249 | 26,995 | 19,324 |
| Colombia | 78,070 | 71,137 | 70,686 | 32,466 | 41,714 | 109,333 | 23,979 | – |
| Egypt | 36,000 | 42,515 | 39,050 | 56,480 | 81,731 | 116,683 | 123,425 | 59,765 |
| Finland | 69,053 | 45,035 | 7,703 | 2,900 | 2,540 | 6,665 | 21,644 | 38,926 |
| Netherlands | 44,122 | 29,807 | 29,183 | 57,462 | 73,151 | 94,132 | 102,204 | 98,823 |
| Australia | 173,009 | 180,311 | 215,926 | 209,730 | 224,193 | 243,495 | 394,713 | 347,122 |
| Azerbaijan | 2,145 | 669 | 424 | 540 | 556 | 490 | – | – |
| Ecuador | 5,986 | 24,322 | 24,322 | 24,322 | 22,335 | 32,254 | 41,047 | – |
| Bulgaria | – | 2,508 | 2,200 | – | – | – | – | 2,200 |
| North Korea | 4,000 | 4,000 | 4,000 | 4,000 | 4,000 | 4,000 | 5,000 | 7,000 |
| Tunisia | 540 | 540 | 1,860 | 1,860 | 1,860 | – | – | – |
| Ukraine | 8,244 | 28,751 | 50,449 | 76,281 | 104,654 | 83,133 | 215,759 | 31,255 |
| Venezuela | 19,759 | 71,753 | 104,083 | 102,409 | 104,357 | 135,425 | 21,190 | 96,400 |
| Serbia | 83,630 | 103,150 | 113,878 | 11,032 | 11,023 | 18,033 | 14,179 | 12,740 |
| Bangladesh | 536 | – | – | – | – | – | – | – |
| Zimbabwe | – | 829 | 829 | 829 | 257 | 960 | 792 | – |
| Uruguay | – | – | – | – | – | – | 14,404 | – |
| Kenya | – | 3,080 | 3,080 | 2,945 | – | 405 | 288 | – |
| Chile | – | – | – | – | 4,700 | 6,660 | 5,245 | – |
| Nigeria | – | – | – | – | – | 2,937 | 7,834 | – |
| Peru | – | – | – | – | – | 1,566 | – | – |
| Greece | – | – | – | – | – | – | – | 470 |

== 1950–2000 ==
| Country | 2000 | 1995 | 1990 | 1980 | 1970 | 1960 | 1950 |
|---|---|---|---|---|---|---|---|
| World | 58,374,162 | 50,046,000 | 48,553,969 | 38,564,516 | 29,419,484 | 16,488,340 | 10,577,426 |
| China | 2,069,069 | 1,434,772 | 509,242 | 222,288 | 87,166 | 22,574 | – |
| United States | 12,799,857 | 11,985,457 | 9,782,997 | 8,009,841 | 8,283,949 | 7,905,119 | 8,005,859 |
| Japan | 10,140,796 | 10,195,536 | 13,486,796 | 11,042,884 | 5,289,157 | 481,551 | 31,597 |
| India | 801,360 | 636,000 | 362,655 | 113,917 | 76,409 | 51,136 | 14,688 |
| Mexico | 3,099,522 | 2,629,008 | 1,814,466 | 1,565,174 | 916,089 | 533,041 | – |
| South Korea | 3,114,998 | 2,526,400 | 1,321,630 | 123,135 | 28,819 | – | – |
| Germany | 5,526,615 | 4,667,364 | 4,976,552 | 3,878,553 | 3,842,247 | 2,056,149 | 306,064 |
| Brazil | 1,681,527 | 1,629,008 | 914,466 | 1,165,174 | 416,089 | 133,041 | – |
| Spain | 3,032,874 | 2,333,787 | 2,053,350 | 1,181,659 | 539,132 | 58,209 | – |
| Thailand | 411,721 | 533,200 | 304,843 | 73,347 | 22,055 | – | – |
| Czech Republic | 455,492 | 216,000 | – | – | – | – | – |
| Iran | 430,947 | 282,000 | 209,150 | 50,881 | 25,000 | – | – |
| Canada | 2,961,636 | 2,407,999 | 1,947,106 | 1,369,607 | 1,159,504 | 397,739 | 387,726 |
| Indonesia | 379,300 | 292,710 | – | 103,000 | – | – | – |
| Turkey | 277,985 | – | 44,665 | 161,000 | 35,000 | – | – |
| Slovakia | 181,783 | 22,600 | – | – | – | – | – |
| Russia | 1,205,581 | 608,460 | – | – | – | – | – |
| France | 3,348,361 | 3,474,705 | 3,768,993 | 3,378,433 | 2,750,086 | 1,369,210 | 357,512 |
| United Kingdom | 1,813,894 | 1,765,000 | 1,565,957 | 1,312,914 | 2,098,498 | 1,810,700 | 783,672 |
| Malaysia | 282,830 | 164,000 | 191,580 | 104,227 | – | – | – |
| South Africa | 345,297 | – | 334,779 | 404,766 | 297,573 | – | – |
| Italy | 1,738,315 | 1,667,270 | 2,120,850 | 1,610,287 | 1,854,252 | 644,633 | 127,847 |
| Romania | 78,165 | 93,000 | 94,000 | 124,000 | 59,000 | 12,000 | |
| Morocco | 31,314 | – | – | – | – | – | – |
| Poland | 404,972 | 381,000 | 287,975 | 237,834 | 113,087 | 37,000 | 1,000 |
| Argentina | 339,632 | 286,000 | 99,639 | 281,793 | 219,599 | 89,000 | – |
| Hungary | 137,398 | 53,000 | – | – | – | 3,000 | – |
| Uzbekistan | 32,273 | – | – | – | – | – | – |
| Portugal | 245,784 | 57,000 | 26,000 | 91,000 | – | – | – |
| Taiwan | 361,800 | 406,000 | 382,000 | 132,116 | – | – | – |
| Sweden | 339,229 | 301,343 | 490,000 | 344,000 | 317,000 | 311,000 | 129,000 |
| Belgium | 1,033,294 | 468,000 | 1,248,290 | 923,426 | 296,000 | 1,000 | – |
| Vietnam | 6,862 | – | – | – | – | – | – |
| Pakistan | 31,500 | – | – | – | – | – | – |
| Philippines | 38,877 | 107,000 | – | – | – | – | – |
| Austria | 141,026 | 68,000 | 20,000 | 14,000 | 7,000 | 13,000 | – |
| Slovenia | 98,953 | – | – | – | – | – | – |
| Ireland | – | – | 47,000 | – | – | – | – |
| Belarus | 19,324 | – | – | 40,100 | 29,800 | 18,700 | 2,400 |
| Colombia | – | 34,850 | 43,000 | – | – | – | – |
| Egypt | 59,765 | – | – | – | – | – | – |
| Finland | 38,926 | – | – | – | – | – | – |
| Netherlands | 98,823 | 132,000 | 111,000 | 97,000 | 79,000 | 19,000 | – |
| Australia | 347,122 | 331,000 | 284,000 | 361,000 | 475,000 | 204,000 | 58,000 |
| Bulgaria | 2,200 | – | 21,000 | 12,000 | – | – | – |
| North Korea | 7,000 | 9,000 | 13,000 | – | – | – | 3,000 |
| Ukraine | 31,255 | 67,400 | – | 206,700 | 115,700 | 7,500 | 18,300 |
| Venezuela | 96,400 | – | 153,000 | – | – | – | – |
| Serbia | 12,740 | – | – | – | – | – | – |
| Greece | 470 | 530 | 18,333 | 18,187 | 2,200 | 34 | – |
| New Zealand | – | – | 90,000 | 55,178 | 32,409 | 9,731 | – |
| Soviet Union | – | – | 2,039,600 | 2,199,200 | 916,118 | 523,591 | 362,985 |
| Czechoslovakia | – | – | 242,000 | 233,112 | 169,920 | 75,000 | 31,000 |
| Yugoslavia | – | – | 239,000 | 278,000 | 124,000 | 16,000 | 1,000 |
| East Germany | – | – | – | 216,585 | 153,378 | 77,350 | 8,243 |

== Images ==
Countries by volume of production since 1950

Countries by shares of production since 1950

== See also ==
- List of countries by motor vehicle production in the 2000s
- List of countries by motor vehicle production in the 2010s
- List of automotive manufacturers by production
- Automotive industry by country
- List of countries and territories by motor vehicles per capita
- Automotive industry
- List of countries by vehicle exports
