= Big Three (automobile manufacturers) =

Three largest car manufacturers of a country

In the United States automotive industry, the term Big Three is used for the country's three largest motor vehicle manufacturers, especially indicating companies that sell under multiple brand names.

The term originated in the United States, where General Motors was the first to form a large, multi-brand, motor-vehicle corporation (in the 1910s), followed by the Ford Motor Company, and the Chrysler Corporation, all before World War II.

The term Big Three has since been sometimes used to refer to the following automakers:

- United States — General Motors, Ford, and Stellantis North America (Chrysler Corporation)
- Germany — the Volkswagen Group, the Mercedes-Benz Group, and BMW
- France — Peugeot, Renault, and Citroën
- Italy — Fiat, Alfa Romeo, and Lancia
- Japan — Toyota, Honda, and Nissan
- South Korea — Hyundai Motor Company, KG Mobility, GM Korea (formerly Daewoo)
- India — Mahindra, Maruti Suzuki, and Tata Motors
- China — BYD Auto, Geely Auto, and Great Wall Motor are private-owned Big Three while GAC Group, BAIC Group, and SAIC Motor are state-owned Big Three.
- Australia — Ford, Holden, and Toyota or Ford, Holden and Chrysler

== United States ==
General Motors, the Ford Motor Company and Chrysler are often referred to as the Big Three, although Chrysler has been surpassed as the third-largest U.S. automaker by Toyota of America. G.M., Ford and Chrysler were for a time the three largest automakers in the world, with G.M. and Ford remaining as the world's two largest until mid-2000s when they both were surpassed by Toyota (and later the Volkswagen Group), although Ford was in 1999 expected to surpass G.M. as the world's largest automaker by 2005, by increasing its production from around 7.77 million vehicles a year (of which about 1 million produced by Mazda in which Ford then owned a 33.4% controlling interest) by 1999 to 9.15 million by 2005 (when G.M. was expected to produce 9.10 million). The Big Three are distinguished not just by their size and geography, but by their business model. All three have their headquarters in the Detroit metro area and as such are sometimes also referred to as the Detroit Three or the Detroit Automakers. The majority of their operations are unionized with the United Auto Workers and Unifor.

Toyota, which surpassed G.M. as the world's largest automaker in 2006, became that year for the first time one of the Big Three of the U.S. when surpassing Chrysler. After surpassing Ford as the world's second-largest automaker by 2003, Toyota surpassed Ford in 2007 as the second-largest U.S. automaker, a title Ford had held since 1931. However, by 2010, because of Toyota's controversy surrounding their unintended acceleration recall, Toyota fell back to third place in U.S. sales in the 2010s, and allowed G.M. and Ford to reclaim their title as the top two us automakers. Toyota, however, overtook GM as the best-selling automaker in the United States in 2021, marking the first time a non-American automaker has led US auto sales for a full year.

Ignoring all other reasons for The Big Three's decline, and beginning with a fixed ideological/political premise that efficiency is best achieved by reducing the wages and working conditions of the lowest ranked employees, advocates of the neoclassical economic viewpoint argue that Union labor can result in higher labor costs than other multinational automakers, including those with plants in North America. The 2005 Harbour Report estimated that Toyota's lead in labor productivity amounted to a cost advantage of $350 US to $500 US per vehicle over American manufacturers. The UAW agreed to a two-tier wage in recent 2007 negotiations, something which the CAW has so far refused. Delphi, which was spun off from GM in 1999, filed for Chapter 11 bankruptcy after the UAW refused to cut their wages and GM is expected to be liable for a $7 billion shortfall.

To improve profits, the Detroit automakers made deals with unions to reduce wages while making pension and health care commitments. GM, for instance, at one time picked up the entire cost of funding health insurance premiums of its employees, their survivors and GM retirees, as the US did not have a universal health care system. With most of these plans underfunded in the late 1990s, the companies offered and provided retirement packages to its elder senior workers, and made agreements with the UAW to transfer pension obligations to an independent trust. In 2009, the CBC reported that the non-unionized Japanese automakers, with their younger American workforces, lower wages and fewer retirees would continue to enjoy a cost advantage over the Big Three.

Despite the history of their marques, several long-running cars have been discontinued or relegated to fleet sales, as the Big Three shifted away resources from midsize and compact cars to lead the "SUV Craze". Since the late 1990s, over half of their profits have come from Sport utility vehicles, while they often could not break even on compact cars unless the buyer chose options. Ron Harbour, in releasing the Oliver Wyman’s 2008 Harbour Report, stated that many small "econoboxes" of the past acted as loss leaders, but were designed to bring customers to the brand in the hopes they would stay loyal and move up to more profitable models. The report estimated that an automaker needed to sell ten small cars to make the same profit as one big vehicle, and that they had to produce small and mid-size cars profitably to succeed, something that the Detroit three had trouble doing.

Falling sales and market share at times have resulted in the Big Three's plants operating below capacity leading to production cuts, plant reductions, closures and layoffs. Market incentives and subsidized leases were implemented to help sales which was crucial to keeping the plants operating at capacity, which in turn drove a significant portion of the Michigan economy. These promotional strategies, including rebates, employee pricing and 0 percent financing, have boosted sales but have also cut into profits. More importantly such promotions drain the automaker's cash reserves in the near term while in the long run the company suffers the stigma of selling vehicles because of low price instead of technical merit. Automakers have since been reduced and scaled back on incentives and raise prices, while cutting production. The subprime mortgage crisis and inflated higher crude prices in 2008 resulted in the plummeting popularity of best-selling trucks and SUVs, led automakers to continue offering heavy incentives to help clear excess inventory.

The Big Three filed a lawsuit against California Governor Arnold Schwarzenegger because of an earmarked impending tailpipe emissions requirement. In response, Governor Schwarzenegger told the Big Three to "get off [their] butt".

In 2008, with relatively high energy prices, a stagnant and declining economy and an overall tense market situation due to the subprime mortgage crisis, the Big Three were re-strategizing and adapting their operations idling or converting light truck plants to passenger vehicle cars. Due to the declining residual value of its vehicles, Chrysler has stopped offering leases on its vehicles.

In 2009, General Motors and Chrysler filed for and eventually successfully emerged from Chapter 11 restructuring to restructure and liquidate burdensome corporate assets in the same year. General Motors of Canada did not file for bankruptcy. The United States and Canadian government control are reported as temporary.

On June 10, 2009, Chrysler Group LLC emerged from a Chapter 11 reorganization bankruptcy and its stake was subsequently bought by the Italian automaker Fiat. On June 3, 2011, Fiat bought out the remaining US Treasury's stake in Chrysler for $500 million, increasing its ownership of the automaker to 53 percent. On January 21, 2014, Fiat bought out the remaining stake in Chrysler Group that it did not already hold from the United Auto Workers' employee medical benefit retirement trust.

Due to the corporate structure of Fiat Chrysler Automobiles, which is headquartered in the United Kingdom for taxation purposes and the Italian Agnelli family as the major shareholders, some media sources now list Detroit as having a "Big Two" (GM and Ford) as opposed to a "Big Three". Chrysler has become part of multinational auto giant Stellantis after FCA Group merged with the largely pan-European PSA Group in 2021.

In more recent times Texas-based Tesla has been included, thus the expression "big four" has been used. Tesla as of 2021 ranked as the fourth-largest American automobile manufacturer by production output while being by far the fastest growing as well as being the most valuable in terms of its market valuation measured by market capitalization. In 2021 Tesla was worth more than all of Japan's and Germany's largest automakers combined.

== Japan ==
Japanese automakers Toyota, Nissan and Honda, among many others, have long been considered the leaders in the segment of small fuel-efficient cars. A major contributing factor to their success was when their vehicles benefitted from the 1973 oil crisis which at the time drastically changed market situations and had a major impact on the automotive industry. For instance, the Honda Civic was the best-selling car in its segment in Canada for 22 years in a row.

As well, the Nissan 240Z was introduced at a relatively low price compared to other foreign sports cars of the time (Jaguar, BMW, Porsche, etc.), while providing performance, reliability, and good looks. This broadened the image of Japanese car-makers beyond their econobox successes, as well as being credited as a catalyst for the import performance parts industry.

Before Honda unveiled Acura in 1986, Japanese automobiles exports were primarily economical in design and largely targeted at low-cost consumers. The Japanese big three created their luxury marques to challenge the established brands. Following Honda's lead, Toyota launched the Lexus name with the LS 400 which debuted at $38,000 in the US, in some markets being priced against mid-sized six cylinder Mercedes-Benz and BMW models, and was rated by Car and Driver magazine as better than both the $63,000 Mercedes-Benz W126 and the $55,000 BMW E32 in terms of ride, handling and performance.

It was generally regarded as a major shock to the European marques. BMW and Mercedes-Benz's US sales figures dropped 29 percent and 19 percent, respectively, with the then-BMW chairman Eberhard von Kuenheim accusing Lexus of dumping in that market. Nissan's Infiniti became a player on the luxury market mostly thanks to its popular Q45. The vehicle included a class-leading (at the time) 278 hp (207 kW) V8 engine, four wheel steering, the first active suspension system offered on a motor vehicle, and numerous interior luxury appointments. These made it competitive against the German imports like Audi, BMW and Mercedes-Benz, which by the time of Infiniti's release had overtaken Cadillac and Lincoln in dominating the luxury segment of the American market.

In 1990, four years after the debut of the Legend and Integra, Acura introduced the NSX, a midship V6 powered, rear-wheel-drive sports car. The NSX, an acronym for "New Sports eXperimental", was billed as the first Japanese car capable of competing with Ferrari and Porsche. This vehicle served as a halo car for the Acura brand. The NSX was the world's first all-aluminium production car, and was also marketed and viewed by some as the "Everyday Supercar" thanks in part to its ease of use, quality and reliability, traits that were unheard of in the supercar segment at the time.

The success of the Japanese automakers, which specialized primarily in more compact and fuel efficient budget friendly economical vehicles, especially in the aftermath of the energy crisis, contributed to their American counterparts losing market share in the late 1970s due to a lack of comparable vehicles in their respective portfolios of vehicles marketed. Unions and lobbyists in both North America and Europe, which was likewise affected, consequently put pressure on their governments to regulate and restrict imports to offset market imbalances at the time. In 1981, Japan agreed to Voluntary Export Restraints to preempt protectionism measures that the US may have taken, where it be tariffs or import quotas.

Consequently, Japanese companies responded by investing heavily in US production facilities, as they were not subject to the VER. Unlike the plants of domestic automakers, Japanese plants are non-unionized (save for NUMMI), so they have lower wage expenses and do not face the risk of strikes. The VER was lifted in 1994 upon agreement of all members of General Agreement on Tariffs and Trade (GATT). Establishing US production facilities was also a significant step in improving public relations, along with philanthropy, lobbying efforts, and sharing technology. Europe has still largely maintained its protectionism policies against Japanese cars, though theirs varies considerably.

Toyota has always been by far Japan's largest automaker, and it recently overtook perennial world leader GM in both production and sales by early 2008. As the most aggressive of Japan's companies when it came to expanding into light trucks and luxury vehicles, this proved largely successful. Their high-end brand Lexus became the top-selling luxury marque worldwide in 2000, despite being only started up in 1989. Consequently, Toyota's stock price has traded at a much higher premium than other automakers.

Nissan regained its position on second place, financial difficulties in the late 1990s caused it to lose its place to Honda before. Nissan is Japan's second largest automaker and was the sixth largest in the world in 2005 and later 2010 to 2017. Suzuki, Mazda, and Mitsubishi are in a distant fourth, fifth, and sixth place compared to the Japanese Big Three.

Toyota, Honda, and Nissan are all in the BusinessWeek magazine's "100 Top Global Brands" by dollar value, as ranked by leading brand consultancy Interbrand. The Toyota marque was valued at US$22.67 billion, ranking it ninth among all global brand names – automotive or non-automotive, edging out that of Mercedes-Benz. 2010 end of year production figures from the International Organization of Motor Vehicle Manufacturers shows that Toyota holds the number 1 spot, Nissan number 6, and Honda number 7.

== Germany ==
The German trio Audi, Mercedes-Benz and BMW are often referred to as "Germany's Big Three", although the actual major automobile manufacturers are the Volkswagen Group (majority owner of Audi AG), the Mercedes-Benz Group, and BMW.

Other major German manufacturers are Opel and American-owned Ford-Werke (subsidiary of Ford Motor Company), but are not considered as part of this grouping, although they are among the top selling brands in Europe – they are both foreign-owned (Opel is a subsidiary of Stellantis since 2021 and had been owned by PSA Group and General Motors before that, whilst Ford Werke is a wholly owned subsidiary of Ford Motor Company), and are largely Germany based and carry out much of their research and development in the nation.

Volkswagen Group has long been the largest automaker in Europe. In the late-2000s, it edged out Ford, and later in mid-2010s also General Motors, to become the world's second largest automaker, after Toyota. It is also the parent group of Audi, Porsche, SEAT, Škoda, Bugatti, Lamborghini and Bentley.

Daimler AG holds major stakes in other automakers including Mitsubishi Fuso.

BMW also produces Mini branded vehicles, and has been the parent company of Rolls-Royce Motor Cars since 1998.

BMW, Mercedes-Benz and Audi make up about 80 percent of the global luxury car market.
