= List of countries by motor vehicle production in the 2000s =

Motor vehicles produced by country in 2000

This is a list of countries by motor vehicle production in the 2000s based on Organisation Internationale des Constructeurs d'Automobiles (OICA).

Figures include passenger cars, light commercial vehicles, minibuses, trucks, buses and coaches.

== 2002 ==
Reference: http://www.oica.net/category/production-statistics/2002-statistics/

== 2003 ==
Top 20 motor vehicle producing countries 2003
Motor vehicle production (1000 units)
Country	1000	2000	3000	4000	5000	6000	7000	8000	9000	10000	11000	12000
United States							12115
Japan							10286
Germany							5507
China						4444
France					3620
South Korea					3178
Spain				3030
Canada				2553
United Kingdom			1846
Brazil			1828
Mexico			1575
Italy			1322
Russia			1279
India			1162
Belgium		904
Thailand		742
Iran		582
Turkey		533
Czech Republic		442
South Africa		421
Reference: "World Motor Vehicle Production by Country: 2003–2004" (PDF). OICA.

Reference: "World Motor Vehicle Production by Country: 2003–2004" (PDF). OICA.

== 2004 ==
Top 20 motor vehicle producing countries 2004
Motor vehicle production (1000 units)
Country	1000	2000	3000	4000	5000	6000	7000	8000	9000	10000	11000	12000
United States								11989
Japan								10512
Germany							5570
China							5071
France					3666
South Korea					3469
Spain				3011
Canada				2711
Brazil				2210
United Kingdom			1856
Mexico			1565
India			1511
Russia			1385
Italy			1142
Thailand		928
Belgium		900
Turkey		823
Iran		789
Poland		594
South Africa		455
Reference: "World Motor Vehicle Production by Country: 2003–2004" (PDF). OICA.

== 2005 ==
Top 20 motor vehicle producing countries 2005
Motor vehicle production (1000 units)
Country	1000	2000	3000	4000	5000	6000	7000	8000	9000	10000	11000	12000
United States								11947
Japan								10800
Germany							5758
PR China							5708
South Korea					3699
France					3549
Spain				2752
Canada				2688
Brazil				2531
United Kingdom			1803
Mexico			1684
India			1639
Russia			1355
Thailand			1123
Italy		1038
Belgium		927
Turkey		879
Iran		817
Poland		613
Czech Rep.		602
Reference: "World Motor Vehicle Production by Country: 2005–2006" (PDF). OICA.

== 2006 ==
Top 20 motor vehicle producing countries 2006
Motor vehicle production (1000 units)
Country	1000	2000	3000	4000	5000	6000	7000	8000	9000	10000	11000	12000
Japan								11484
United States								11264
China								7189
Germany							5820
South Korea					3840
France					3169
Spain				2777
Brazil				2611
Canada				2572
Mexico			2046
India			2020
United Kingdom			1648
Russia			1508
Italy			1212
Thailand			1194
Turkey		988
Belgium		918
Iran		904
Czech Rep.		855
Poland		715
Reference: "World Motor Vehicle Production by Country: 2005–2006" (PDF). OICA.

== 2007 ==
Top 20 motor vehicle producing countries 2007
Motor vehicle production (1000 units)
Country	1000	2000	3000	4000	5000	6000	7000	8000	9000	10000	11000	12000
Japan							11596
United States							10781
China							8882
Germany							6213 (includes GM Belgium)
South Korea						4086
France				3019
Brazil				2971
Spain				2890
Canada				2578
India				2307
Mexico				2095
UK			1750
Russia			1660
Italy			1284
Thailand			1238
Turkey			1099
Iran		997
Czech Rep.		939
Belgium		844
Poland		785
Reference: "World Motor Vehicle Production by Country: 2006–2007" (PDF). OICA.

== 2008 ==
Top 20 motor vehicle producing countries 2008
Motor vehicle production (units)
Country	1,000,000	2,000,000	3,000,000	4,000,000	5,000,000	6,000,000	7,000,000	8,000,000	9,000,000	10,000,000	11,000,000	12,000,000
Japan	11,563,629
China	9,345,101
United States	8,705,239
Germany	6,040,582
South Korea	3,806,682
Brazil	3,220,475
France	2,568,978
Spain	2,541,644
India	2,314,662
Mexico	2,191,230
Canada	2,077,589
Russia	1,790,301
UK	1,649,515
Thailand	1,393,742
Turkey	1,147,110
Iran	1,051,430
Italy	1,023,774
Poland	950,908
Czech Rep.	945,822
Belgium	724,498
Reference: "Production Statistics". OICA.

== 2009 ==
Top 20 motor vehicle producing countries 2009
Motor vehicle production (units)
Country	1,000,000	2,000,000	3,000,000	4,000,000	5,000,000	6,000,000	7,000,000	8,000,000	9,000,000	10,000,000	11,000,000	12,000,000	13,000,000	14,000,000
China	13,790,994
Japan	7,934,516
United States	5,711,823
Germany	5,209,857
South Korea	3,512,916
Brazil	3,182,617
India	2,632,694
Spain	2,170,078
France	2,049,762
Mexico	1,557,290
Canada	1,489,651
Iran	1,395,421
UK	1,090,139
Czech Rep.	974,569
Thailand	968,305
Poland	879,186
Turkey	869,605
Italy	843,239
Russia	722,431
Belgium	522,810
Reference: "Production Statistics". OICA.

== See also ==
- 2000s in economics
- List of countries by motor vehicle production in the 2010s
- List of countries by motor vehicle production
- List of manufacturers by motor vehicle production
