= List of countries by motor vehicle production in the 2010s =

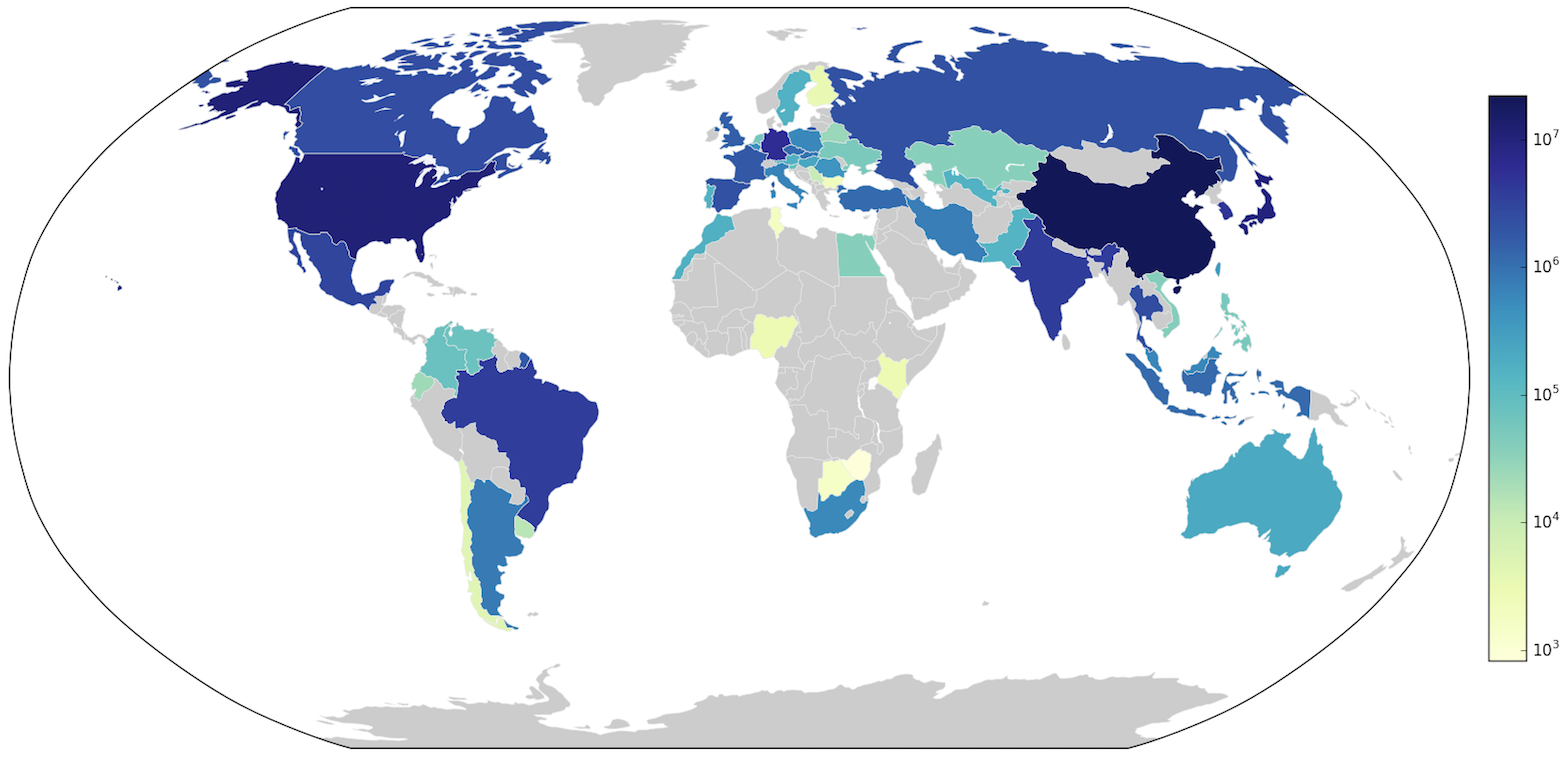
Motor vehicles produced by country in 2013

This is a list of countries by motor vehicle production in the 2010s based on Organisation Internationale des Constructeurs d'Automobiles (OICA).

Figures include passenger cars, light commercial vehicles, minibuses, trucks, buses and coaches.

== 2010 ==
Top 20 motor vehicle producing countries 2010
Motor vehicle production (units)
Country	1,000,000	2,000,000	3,000,000	4,000,000	5,000,000	6,000,000	7,000,000	8,000,000	9,000,000	10,000,000	11,000,000	12,000,000	13,000,000	14,000,000	15,000,000	16,000,000	17,000,000	18,000,000	19,000,000
China	18,264,667
Japan	9,605,985
United States	7,761,443
Germany	5,905,985
South Korea	4,271,941
Brazil	3,648,358
India	3,536,783
Spain	2,387,900
Mexico	2,345,124
France	2,227,742
Canada	2,071,026
Thailand	1,644,513
Iran	1,599,454
Russia	1,403,244
UK	1,393,463
Turkey	1,097,554
Czech Rep.	1,076,385
Poland	869,736
Italy	857,359
Reference: "Production Statistics". OICA.

== 2011 ==
Top 20 motor vehicle producing countries 2011

Motor vehicle production (units)
Country	1,000,000	2,000,000	3,000,000	4,000,000	5,000,000	6,000,000	7,000,000	8,000,000	9,000,000	10,000,000	11,000,000	12,000,000	13,000,000	14,000,000	15,000,000	16,000,000	17,000,000	18,000,000	19,000,000
China	18,418,876
United States	8,653,560
Japan	8,398,654
Germany	6,311,318
South Korea	4,657,094
India	3,936,448
Brazil	3,406,150
Mexico	2,680,037
Spain	2,353,682
France	2,294,889
Canada	2,134,893
Russia	1,988,036
Iran	1,648,505
Thailand	1,478,460
UK	1,463,999
Czech Rep.	1,199,834
Turkey	1,189,131
Indonesia	837,948
Poland	837,132
Argentina	828,771
Italy	790,348
"Production Statistics". OICA.

== 2012 ==
Top 20 motor vehicle producing countries 2012

Motor vehicle production (units)
Country	1,000,000	2,000,000	3,000,000	4,000,000	5,000,000	6,000,000	7,000,000	8,000,000	9,000,000	10,000,000	11,000,000	12,000,000	13,000,000	14,000,000	15,000,000	16,000,000	17,000,000	18,000,000	19,000,000
China	19,271,808
United States	10,328,884
Japan	9,942,711
Germany	5,649,269
South Korea	4,557,738
India	4,145,194
Brazil	3,342,617
Mexico	3,001,974
Thailand	2,483,043
Canada	2,463,732
Russia	2,231,737
Spain	1,979,179
France	1,967,765
UK	1,576,945
Czech Rep.	1,178,938
Turkey	1,072,339
Indonesia	1,065,557
Iran	989,110
Slovakia	900,000
Argentina	764,495
"Production Statistics". OICA.

== 2013 ==
Top 20 motor vehicle producing countries 2013

Motor vehicle production (Kilo units)
Country	1,000	2,000	3,000	4,000	5,000	6,000	7,000	8,000	9,000	10,000	11,000	12,000	13,000	14,000	15,000	16,000	17,000	18,000	19,000	20,000	21,000	22,000
China	22,116,825
United States	11,045,902
Japan	9,630,070
Germany	5,718,222
South Korea	4,521,429
India	3,880,938
Brazil	3,740,418
Mexico	3,052,395
Thailand	2,532,577
Canada	2,379,806
Russia	2,175,311
Spain	2,163,338
France	1,740,000
UK	1,597,433
Indonesia	1,208,211
Czech Rep.	1,132,931
Turkey	1,125,534
Slovakia	975,000
Argentina	791,007
Iran	743,680
"Production Statistics". OICA.

== 2014 ==
Top 20 motor vehicle producing countries 2014

Motor vehicle production (Kilo units)
Country	1,000	2,000	3,000	4,000	5,000	6,000	7,000	8,000	9,000	10,000	11,000	12,000	13,000	14,000	15,000	16,000	17,000	18,000	19,000	20,000	21,000	22,000	23,000
China	23,731,600
United States	11,660,702
Japan	9,774,665
Germany	5,907,548
South Korea	4,524,932
India	3,844,857
Mexico	3,368,010
Brazil	3,146,386
Spain	2,402,978
Canada	2,394,154
Russia	1,887,193
Thailand	1,880,587
France	1,821,464
UK	1,598,879
Indonesia	1,298,523
Czech Rep.	1,251,220
Turkey	1,170,445
Iran	1,090,846
Slovakia	971,160
Italy	697,864
"Production Statistics". OICA.

== 2015 ==
Top 20 motor vehicle producing countries 2015

Motor vehicle production (Kilo units)
Country	1,000	2,000	3,000	4,000	5,000	6,000	7,000	8,000	9,000	10,000	11,000	12,000	13,000	14,000	15,000	16,000	17,000	18,000	19,000	20,000	21,000	22,000	23,000	24,000
China	24,503,326
United States	12,100,095
Japan	9,278,238
Germany	6,033,164
South Korea	4,555,957
India	4,125,744
Mexico	3,565,469
Spain	2,733,201
Brazil	2,429,463
Canada	2,283,474
France	1,970,000
Thailand	1,915,420
UK	1,682,156
Russia	1,384,399
Turkey	1,358,796
Czech Rep.	1,303,603
Indonesia	1,098,780
Italy	1,014,223
Slovakia	1,000,001
Iran	982,337
"Production Statistics". OICA.

== 2016 ==
Top 25 motor vehicle producing countries 2016

Motor vehicle production (Kilo units)
Country
1,000
2,000
3,000
4,000
5,000
6,000
7,000
8,000
9,000
10,000
11,000
12,000
13,000
14,000
15,000
16,000
17,000
18,000
19,000
20,000
21,000
22,000
23,000
24,000
25,000
26,000
27,000
28,000
29,000

China
28,118,794

United States
12,198,137

Japan
9,204,590

Germany
6,062,562

India
4,488,965

South Korea
4,228,509

Mexico
3,597,462

Spain
2,885,922

Canada
2,370,271

Brazil
2,156,356

France
2,082,000

Thailand
1,944,417

UK
1,816,622

Turkey
1,485,927

Czech Rep.
1,349,896

Russia
1,303,989

Indonesia
1,177,389

Iran
1,164,710

Italy
1,103,516

Slovakia
1,040,000

"Production Statistics". OICA.

== See also ==
- List of countries by motor vehicle production in the 2000s
- List of countries by motor vehicle production
- List of manufacturers by motor vehicle production
