= Lost Years =

Lost Years may refer to:

- Lost Years (film), a 1911 silent film dramatic short
- Lost Years: A People's Struggle for Justice, a 2011 documentary film
- The Lost Years (Gli anni perduti), a 1944 novel by Vitaliano Brancati

== See also ==
- Lost Years of Merlin series, a novel series by T. A. Barron
- Unknown years of Jesus, a period in the life of Jesus
- Lost Decade (disambiguation)
