= Econobox =

Slang term for a cheap, fuel-efficient economy car

Econobox is a United States informal slang term for a small, boxy, fuel-efficient economy car with few luxuries and a low price. The term was mainly used during the 1970s to 1990s to describe cars such as the Ford Pinto, Honda Civic, and Geo Metro.

== History ==
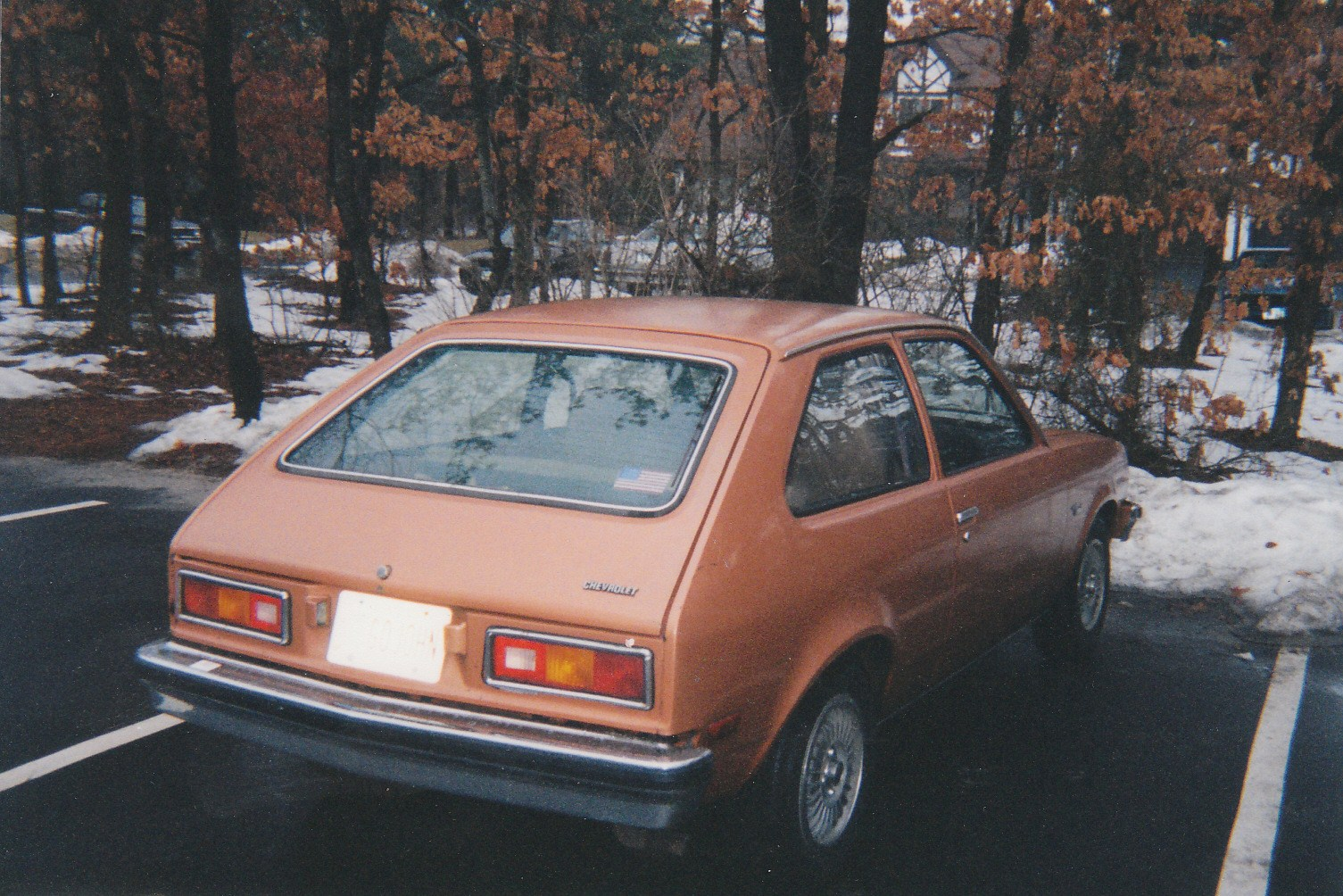
1977 Chevrolet Chevette

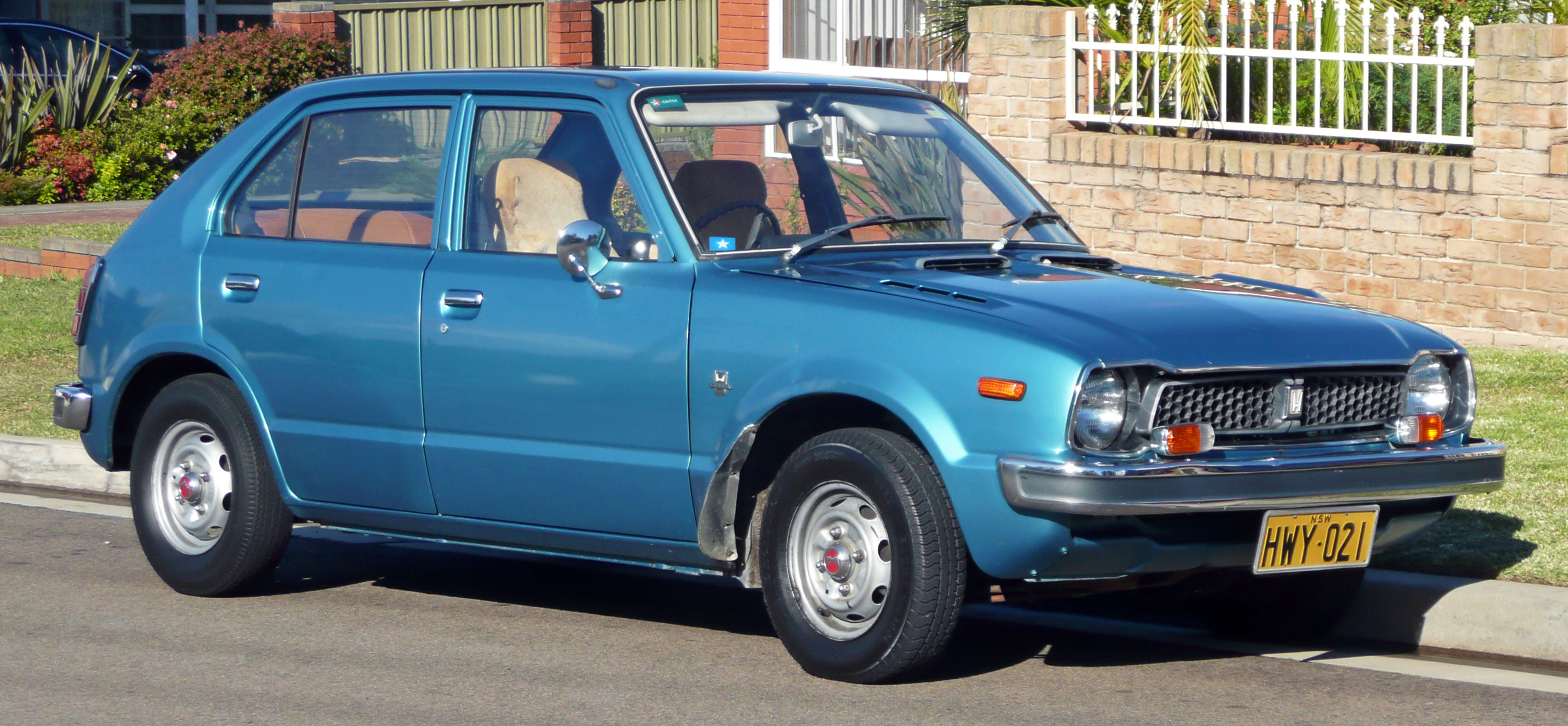
1973-1978 Honda Civic

Econoboxes first came to prominence in the United States due to the 1973 oil crisis. Japanese automakers were leaders at producing smaller, fuel-efficient cars, as well as enjoying generally higher reliability and build quality than their US counterparts, so their offerings such as the Honda Civic generally outperformed their American competitors such as the Chevrolet Vega and Ford Pinto.

The best-known American econoboxes were the 1970s/80s Chevrolet Chevette, Ford Pinto, Ford Escort and the Dodge Omni/Plymouth Horizon. Japanese econoboxes include the Honda Civic (in particular the first and second generations) and the Datsun B-210. Other cars such as the Chevrolet Sprint, Geo Metro, Yugo and Chevrolet Aveo as well as the Ford Festiva and Ford Aspire were considered econoboxes.

Amongst the econoboxes were sold by American brands, many were manufactured in foreign countries. American car manufacturers in North America have typically had a hard time making money off of econoboxes, and they consider them "loss leaders" that only existed to meet CAFE fuel economy standards. So, over the course of time, American car companies shifted from manufacturing econoboxes themselves, and partnered with a foreign manufacturer to build them. An example of this is the American Ford Escort: the Escort replaced the Pinto in 1981, and was manufactured by Ford until 1990. From 1991 to 1996, however, it was built using the Mazda B platform and the top trims featured a Mazda engine. Chevrolet did the same using its "GEO" line, to sell cars built by Suzuki and Toyota. Chrysler did as well, using cars built by Mitsubishi.

== Today ==
The term "econobox" is not often used for describing new cars, partly due to the boxy styling of economy cars declining at the end of the 1980s.

Many longer-running nameplates that obtained their start as econoboxes have since moved upscale. For example, the Austin Mini and VW Beetle have been revived as enthusiast luxury cars rather than cheap cars. Meanwhile, the Toyota Corolla, Mazda 3 and the Honda Civic started as subcompact econoboxes but are now on the high-end of the compact size line. In 2023 the cheapest new car available in the United States is the Nissan Versa priced below US$20,000, with the cheapest trims starting at $16,000.

== See also ==
- A-segment
- B-segment
- C-segment
