= Lost Decade =

Lost Decade may refer to:

- Lost Decade (Peru), the economic, political and social crisis that took place in Peru in the 1980s
- Lost Decades, an economic crisis in Japan that began in the 1990s
- The Lost Decade, a television series broadcast by the BBC
- Década Perdida or The Lost Decade, the economic crisis in Latin America in general, specifically in Mexico, in the 1980s
- 1970s in economics, dubbed as a "lost decade" for the United Kingdom
- 2000s in economics, dubbed as a "lost decade" for the United States
- United Kingdom government austerity programme during the 2010s and early 2020s, dubbed as a "lost decade"

== See also ==
- China's Lost Decade: The Politics and Poetics of the 1980s, a book by Gregory B. Lee
- Lost Years (disambiguation)
