= List of automotive manufacturers by production =

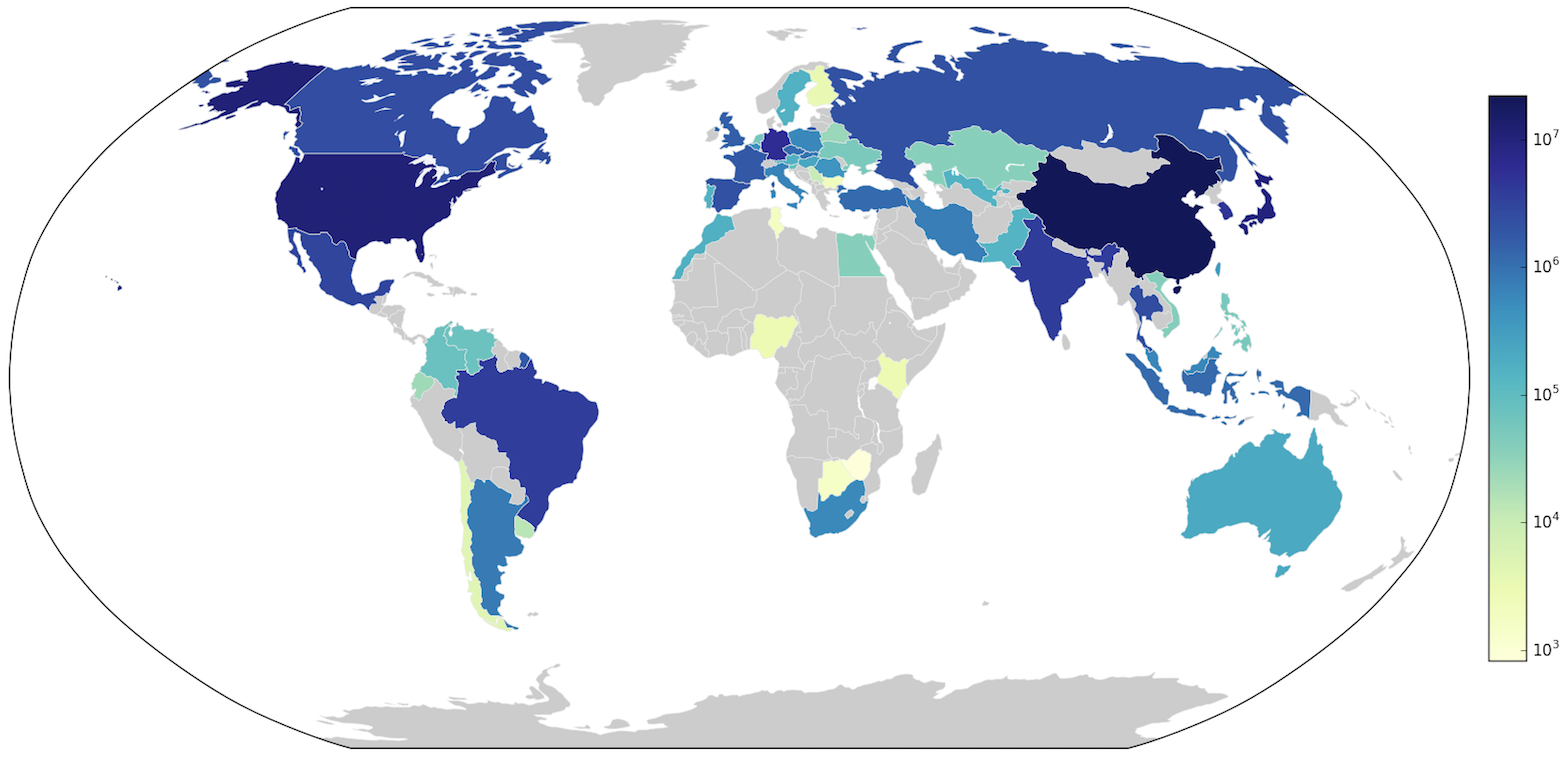
Motor vehicles produced by country in 2013

This is a list of the biggest motor vehicle manufacturers by annual sales or production, compiled using data from F&I Tools USA (2018 onwards) and the Organisation internationale des Constructeurs d'Automobiles (OICA) (2001–2017).

== 2018–2025 worldwide car sales ==
As OICA stopped publishing statistics of motor vehicle production by manufacturer post-2017, numbers for 2018 onward only include sales by the manufacturer.

These figures may not be accurate, as they are compiled from a third-party source.

For 2025, the figures for General Motors and SAIC Motor continue to include volume from their joint venture, SAIC-GM-Wuling. Further, the figures for Geely include not only Geely Auto, but also all the other brands owned by Geely, such as Volvo, Zeekr, Lynk & Co, and more. Combined, they sold about 4.11 million cars in 2025. Additionally, Changan's sales figures include volume from their joint ventures, inflating their sales numbers.

=== 2021–2025 ===
BYD entered the top 10 and Changan and Geely increased sales. Tesla entered the top 15 in 2023 then fell out in 2024.

Rank in 2025	Group	Country	Sold vehicles (2025)	Sold vehicles (2024)	Sold vehicles (2023)	Sold vehicles (2022)	Sold vehicles (2021)
1	Toyota	Japan	11,322,575	11,011,375	10,307,395	9,566,961	9,562,483
2	Volkswagen Group	Germany	8,983,978	9,037,425	9,239,575	8,263,104	8,882,346
3	Hyundai Motor Group	South Korea	7,272,453	7,231,248	7,302,451	6,848,198	6,668,037
4	General Motors	United States	6,183,928	6,001,247	6,188,476	5,941,737	6,294,385
5	Stellantis	Netherlands	5,600,000	5,525,875	6,392,600	6,002,900	6,142,200
6	BYD Auto	China	4,602,436	4,272,145	3,024,417	1,881,669	
7	SAIC Motor	China	4,507,500	4,013,023	5,020,865	5,303,000	5,464,000
8	Ford	United States	4,400,000	4,470,165	4,413,545	4,235,737	3,942,755
9	Geely	China	4,116,321	3,340,000	2,790,000	2,300,000	2,200,000
10	Honda	Japan	3,521,905	3,716,295	4,188,039	4,074,372	4,456,728
11	FAW Group	China	3,302,000	3,200,000	3,370,000	3,200,000	3,500,000
12	Suzuki	Japan	3,295,013	3,240,385	3,168,249	3,000,945	
13	Nissan	Japan	3,202,137	3,346,248	3,374,271	3,225,478	4,064,999
14	Changan	China	2,913,177	2,683,798	2,553,052	2,347,163	2,314,547
15	Chery	China	2,806,393	2,603,916	1,881,316	1,241,000	961,926

=== 2018–2020 ===
All ten largest automakers by production as of 2017 remained in the top 10 before the 2021 merger between Fiat-Chrysler and the PSA Group.

Rank in 2020	Group	Country	Sold vehicles (2020)	Sold vehicles (2019)	Sold vehicles (2018)
1	Toyota	Japan	9,528,753	10,741,556	10,521,134
2	Volkswagen Group	Germany	9,305,427	10,975,352	10,831,232
3	General Motors	United States	6,833,592	7,724,163	8,787,233
4	Hyundai Motor Group	South Korea	6,353,514	7,189,893	7,437,209
5	Honda	Japan	4,790,438	5,323,319	5,265,892
6	Ford	United States	4,231,549	5,385,972	5,734,217
7	Nissan	Japan	4,029,174	5,176,211	5,653,743
8	Fiat-Chrysler (Note: now part of Stellantis)	Italy/United States	3,693,597	4,612,673	4,841,366
9	Renault	France	2,949,871	3,749,815	3,883,987
10	PSA Group (Note: now part of Stellantis)	France	2,512,399	3,479,152	4,126,349
11	Maruti Suzuki (only the Suzuki subsidiary)	India	?	2,851,598	3,212,984
12	BMW	Germany	2,324,778	2,520,146	2,494,276
13	Mercedes	Germany	2,164,275	2,339,024	2,310,253
14	Geely	China	1,320,471	1,361,556	1,500,458
15	Mazda	Japan	1,243,039	1,454,121	1,631,142

== 2001–2017 production volumes ==
These figures from OICA include a variety of vehicle types, defined as follows:

- Passenger cars: Vehicles with at least four wheels, primarily used to transport passengers, with no more than eight seats in addition to the driver’s seat.
- Light commercial vehicles (LCVs): Vehicles with at least four wheels, mainly for transporting goods, with a maximum mass ranging between 3.5 and 7 tons depending on national definitions. Minibuses also fall into this category; they are used for passenger transport, contain more than eight seats in addition to the driver, and have a maximum mass within the same range.
- Heavy trucks (HCVs): Vehicles designed to carry goods above the mass limits of light commercial vehicles, including tractor units for towing semi-trailers.
- Buses and coaches: Vehicles for passenger transport with more than eight seats beyond the driver, and a maximum mass exceeding the limits defined for light commercial vehicles.

This classification ensures that production statistics are comparable across countries and manufacturers.

=== Production overview ===
Motor vehicle production by manufacturer (top five groups)

View source data.

The summary chart includes the five largest worldwide automotive manufacturing groups as of 2017 by number of vehicles produced. Those same groups held the top 5 positions 2007 to 2019; Hyundai Motor Group had a lower rank until it took the fifth spot in 2007 from the at that time split German-American auto manufacturer DaimlerChrysler, while Ford became surpassed by Honda in 2020, and even Nissan in 2021, before surpassing them again in 2022. Figures were compiled by the International Organization of Motor Vehicle Manufacturers (OICA) before the year 2018: 2000, 2001, 2002, 2003, 2004, 2005, 2006, 2007, 2008, 2009, 2010, 2011, 2012, 2013, 2014, 2015, 2016, 2017.

- The Toyota group includes Lexus, Daihatsu, and Hino. (Note: Lexus (100%), Daihatsu (100%), and Hino are subsidiaries of Toyota. OICA listed both Lexus (100% owned by Toyota) and Daihatsu (owned to 51.2% by Toyota 1998 to 2016) combined with Toyota in 1998 and 1999 and Lexus, Daihatsu, and Hino (owned to 50.1% by Toyota since 2001) combined with Toyota in 2000 and again from 2008, but separately 2001 to 2007, although Toyota-Lexus-Daihatsu-Hino was listed combined in the list of the largest auto manufacturers by year for the years 2001 and 2002.)
- The Hyundai Motor Group includes Hyundai, Kia, and Genesis. (Note: Hyundai and Kia have operated as a group since 1998 when Hyundai first took 51% control of Kia. However, OICA listed their manufacturing figures separately 2006 to 2008; together with the addition of Genesis starting in 2015, all three are combined here for consistency with previous and subsequent years.)
- The Volkswagen Group includes VW, Audi, SEAT, Skoda and luxury brands. (Note: Truck producers Scania AB and M.A.N. were included by OICA in group totals for 2011 and 2012, then removed for the following years; they are excluded from the chart for consistency.)
- The General Motors group includes GM Korea, formerly Daewoo, since 2005, Saab until 2009 (sold to Spyker in January 2010), SAIC-GM-Wuling until 2014, and Opel and Vauxhall until 2016 (sold to Groupe PSA in 2017 and subsequently owned by Stellantis in 2021).
- The Ford group includes Jaguar Land Rover 2000 to 2007 (sold to Tata in 2008) and Volvo 1999 to 2009 (sold to Geely in 2010).

=== 2015–2017 ===
This is a list of largest manufacturers by production in 2015, 2016, (some figures were amended in the 2017 report) and 2017.

Rank in 2017	Group	Country	Vehicles (2015)	Vehicles (2016)	Vehicles (2017)
1	Toyota	Japan	10,083,831	10,213,486	10,466,051
2	Volkswagen Group	Germany	9,872,424	10,126,281	10,382,334
3/4	Hyundai Motor Group	South Korea	7,988,479	7,889,538	7,218,391
3/4	General Motors (with SAIC-GM-Wuling) (Note: Including production figures from the Chinese SAIC-GM-Wuling joint venture, which the OICA left out from the 2015 and 2016 GM total contrary to prior practice; they are combined here to allow for consistent comparison with previous years. By default, they were included in the F&I dataset used after 2018.)	United States (China)	7,485,587 (9,490,835)	7,793,066 (9,937,434)	6,856,880 (9,027,658)
5	Ford	United States	6,396,369	6,457,773	6,386,818
6	Nissan	Japan	5,170,074	5,556,241	5,769,277
7	Honda	Japan	4,543,838	4,999,266	5,235,842
8	FCA	Italy / United States	4,865,233	4,681,457	4,600,847
9	Renault	France	3,032,652	3,373,278	4,153,589
10	Groupe PSA	France	2,982,035	3,152,787	3,649,742
11	Suzuki	Japan	3,034,081	2,945,295	3,302,336
12	SAIC	China	2,260,579	2,564,786	2,866,913
13	Daimler	Germany	2,134,645	2,526,450	2,549,142
14	BMW	Germany	2,279,503	2,359,756	2,505,741
15	Geely	China		1,266,456	1,950,382
16	Changan	China	1,540,133	1,715,871	1,616,457
17	Mazda	Japan	1,540,576	1,586,013	1,607,602
18	Dongfeng Motor	China	1,209,296	1,315,490	1,450,999
19	BAIC	China	1,169,894	1,343,682	1,254,483
20	Mitsubishi	Japan	1,218,853		1,210,263
-	Great Wall	China		1,094,360	
-	Tata	India	1,009,369		

=== 2014 ===
Rank of manufacturers by production in 2014

Rank	Group	Country	Total	Cars	LCV	HCV	Buses
1	Toyota	Japan	10,475,338	8,788,018	1,405,072	277,159	5,089
2	Volkswagen Group	Germany	9,894,891	9,766,293	128,598		
3	General Motors	United States	9,609,326	6,643,030	2,951,895	10,875	3,526
4	Hyundai Motor Group	South Korea	8,008,987	7,628,779	280,684	84,387	15,137
5	Ford	United States	5,969,541	3,230,842	2,643,854	94,845	
6	Nissan	Japan	5,097,772	4,279,030	796,992	21,750	
7	Fiat Chrysler	Italy / United States	4,865,758	1,904,618	2,812,345	102,997	45,798
8	Honda	Japan	4,513,769	4,478,123	35,646		
9	Suzuki	Japan	3,016,710	2,543,077	473,633		
10	PSA Peugeot Citroën	France	2,917,046	2,521,833	395,213		
11	Renault	France	2,761,969	2,398,555	363,414		
12	BMW	Germany	2,165,566	2,165,566			
13	SAIC	China	2,087,949	1,769,837	265,087	52,715	310
14	Daimler	Germany	1,973,270	1,808,125	165,145		
15	Changan	China	1,447,017	1,089,179	262,797	95,041	
16	Mazda	Japan	1,328,426	1,261,521	66,905		
17	Dongfeng	China	1,301,695	745,765	201,667	340,955	13,308
18	Mitsubishi	Japan	1,262,342	1,199,823	61,302	1,217	
19	BAIC	China	1,115,847	538,027	278,949	293,055	5,816
20	Tata	India	945,113	614,247	11,399	304,829	14,638

=== 2013 ===
Rank of manufacturers by production in 2013

Rank	Group	Country	Total	Cars	LCV	HCV	Buses
1	Toyota	Japan	10,324,995	8,565,176	1,481,722	272,411	5,686
2	General Motors	United States	9,628,912	6,733,192	2,890,958	4,762	
3	Volkswagen Group	Germany	9,379,229	9,259,506	119,723		
4	Hyundai Motor Group	South Korea	7,233,080	6,909,194	242,021	67,290	14,575
5	Ford	United States	6,077,126	3,317,048	2,667,220	92,858	
6	Nissan	Japan	4,950,924	4,090,677	837,331	22,916	
7	Fiat Chrysler	Italy / United States	4,681,704	2,163,040	2,350,697	124,131	43,836
8	Honda	Japan	4,298,390	4,263,239	35,151		
9	Suzuki	Japan	2,842,133	2,452,573	389,560		
10	PSA Peugeot Citroën	France	2,833,781	2,445,889	387,892		
11	Renault	France	2,704,675	2,347,913	356,762		
12	BMW	Germany	2,006,366	2,006,366			
13	SAIC	China	1,992,250	1,685,392	231,374	74,431	1,053
14	Daimler	Germany	1,781,507	1,631,502	150,005		
15	Mazda	Japan	1,264,173	1,175,443	88,730		
16	Dongfeng	China	1,238,948	642,092	226,319	357,414	13,123
17	Mitsubishi	Japan	1,229,441	1,090,571	135,306	3,564	
18	Changan	China	1,109,889	873,794	166,056	70,039	
19	Tata	India	1,062,654	650,708	279,511	117,425	15,010
20	Geely	China	969,896	969,896			

=== 2012 ===
Rank of manufacturers by production in 2012

Rank	Group	Country	Total	Cars	LCV	HCV	Buses
1	Toyota	Japan	10,104,424	8,381,968	1,448,107	268,377	5,972
2	General Motors	United States	9,285,425	6,608,567	2,658,612	7,558	10,688
3	Volkswagen Group	Germany	9,254,742	8,576,964	486,544	169,064	22,170
4	Hyundai Motor Group	South Korea	7,126,413	6,761,074	279,579	70,290	15,470
5	Ford	United States	5,595,483	3,123,340	2,394,221	77,922	
6	Nissan	Japan	4,889,379	3,830,954	1,022,974	35,451	
7	Honda	Japan	4,110,857	4,078,376	32,481		
8	PSA Peugeot Citroën	France	2,911,764	2,554,059	357,705		
9	Suzuki	Japan	2,893,602	2,483,721	409,881		
10	Renault	France	2,676,226	2,302,769	373,457		
11	Chrysler	United States	2,371,427	656,892	1,702,235	12,300	
12	Daimler	Germany	2,195,152	1,455,650	257,496	450,622	31,384
13	Fiat	Italy	2,127,295	1,501,979	498,984	85,513	40,819
14	BMW	Germany	2,065,477	2,065,216	261		
15	SAIC	China	1,783,548	1,523,398	190,848	67,805	1,497
16	Tata	India	1,241,239	744,067	314,399	165,171	17,602
17	Mazda	Japan	1,189,283	1,097,661	91,622		
18	Dongfeng Motor	China	1,137,950	539,845	245,641	337,545	14,919
19	Mitsubishi	Japan	1,109,731	980,001	127,435	2,295	
20	Changan	China	1,063,721	835,334	166,727	59,978	1,682

=== 2011 ===
Top 20 motor vehicle manufacturing companies by volume 2011
Total motor vehicle production
Group	1,000,000	2,000,000	3,000,000	4,000,000	5,000,000	6,000,000	7,000,000	8,000,000	9,000,000	10,000,000
Key	Cars			Light Commercial Vehicles		Heavy Commercial Vehicles			Heavy Buses
1. General Motors										9,031,670
2. Volkswagen Group								8,525,573
3. Toyota									8,050,181
4. Hyundai Motor Group								6,616,858
5. Ford							5,516,931
6. Nissan						4,631,673
7. PSA Peugeot Citroën					3,582,410
8. Honda				2,909,016
9. Renault				2,825,089
10. Suzuki				2,725,899
11. Fiat				2,336,954
12. Daimler				2,137,067
13. Chrysler			1,999,017
14. BMW			1,738,160
15. SAIC			1,478,502
16. Tata			1,197,192
17. Changan			1,167,208
18. Mazda			1,165,591
19. Mitsubishi			1,140,282
20. Dongfeng Motor			1,108,949
Key	Cars			Light Commercial Vehicles		Heavy Commercial Vehicles			Heavy Buses
Total: 80,045,075	Cars: 59,897,273			LCV:		HCV:			Heavy Bus:
Reference: "WORLD MOTOR VEHICLE PRODUCTION OICA correspondents survey WORLD RANKING OF MANUFACTURERS Year 2011" (PDF). OICA.

=== 2010 ===
Top 20 motor vehicle manufacturing companies by volume 2010
Total motor vehicle production
Group	1,000,000	2,000,000	3,000,000	4,000,000	5,000,000	6,000,000	7,000,000	8,000,000	9,000,000	10,000,000
Key	Cars			Light Commercial Vehicles		Heavy Commercial Vehicles			Heavy Buses
1. Toyota									8,557,351
2. General Motors										8,476,192
3. Volkswagen Group								7,341,065
4. Hyundai Motor Group							5,764,918
5. Ford							4,988,031
6. Nissan					3,982,162
7. Honda					3,643,057
8. PSA Peugeot Citroën					3,605,524
9. Suzuki				2,892,945
10. Renault				2,716,286
11. Fiat				2,410,021
12. Daimler			1,940,465
13. Chrysler			1,578,488
14. BMW			1,481,253
15. Mazda			1,307,540
16. Mitsubishi			1,174,383
17. Changan			1,102,683	2,378,052
18. Tata		1,011,343
19. FAW		896,060		2,572,260
20. Geely		802,319
Key	Cars			Light Commercial Vehicles		Heavy Commercial Vehicles			Heavy Buses
Total: 77,743,862	Cars: 60,343,756			LCV: 13,370,432		HCV: 3,510,681			Heavy Bus: 518,993
Numbers in italics are including joint ventures
Reference: "World motor vehicle production by manufacturer: World ranking of manufacturers 2010" (PDF). OICA. August 2011.

=== 2009 ===
Top 20 motor vehicle manufacturing companies by volume 2009
Total motor vehicle production
Group	1,000,000	2,000,000	3,000,000	4,000,000	5,000,000	6,000,000	7,000,000	8,000,000	9,000,000	10,000,000
Key	Cars			Light Commercial Vehicles		Heavy Commercial Vehicles			Heavy Buses
1. Toyota									7,234,439
2. General Motors								6,459,053
3. Volkswagen Group								6,067,208
4. Ford						4,685,394
5. Hyundai Motor Group						4,645,776
6. PSA Peugeot Citroën					3,042,311
7. Honda				3,012,637
8. Nissan				2,744,562
9. Fiat				2,460,222
10. Suzuki				2,387,537
11. Renault				2,296,009
12. Daimler			1,447,953
13. Changan			1,425,777
14. BMW			1,258,417
15. Mazda		984,520
16. Chrysler		959,070
17. Mitsubishi		802,463
18. Beijing Automotive		684,534
19. Tata		672,045
20. Dongfeng Motor		663,262
Key	Cars			Light Commercial Vehicles		Heavy Commercial Vehicles			Heavy Buses
Total: 60,499,159	Cars: 51,075,480			LCV: 7,817,520		HCV: 1,305,755			Heavy Bus: 300,404
Reference: "World motor vehicle production by manufacturer: World ranking of manufacturers 2009" (PDF). OICA. July 2010.

=== 2008 ===
This is a list of the 20 largest automotive manufacturers, ranked by their production volume in 2008.

Rank	Group	Country	Vehicles
1	Toyota	Japan	9,237,780
2	General Motors	United States	8,282,803
3	Volkswagen Group	Germany	6,437,414
4	Ford	United States	5,407,000
5	Hyundai Motor Group	South Korea	4,172,461
6	Honda	Japan	3,912,700
7	Nissan	Japan	3,395,065
8	PSA Peugeot Citroën	France	3,325,407
9	Suzuki	Japan	2,623,567
10	Fiat	Italy	2,524,325
11	Renault	France	2,417,351
12	Daimler	Germany	2,174,299
13	Chrysler	United States	1,893,068
14	BMW	Germany	1,439,918
15	Mazda	Japan	1,349,274
16	Mitsubishi	Japan	1,309,231
17	AvtoVAZ	Russia	801,563
18	Tata	India	798,265
19	FAW Group (Note: FAW production excluding joint ventures with Volkswagen, Toyota and Mazda)	China	637,720
20	Subaru	Japan	616,497

=== 2007 ===
This is a list of the 20 largest automotive manufacturers, ranked by their production volume in 2007.

Rank	Group	Country	Vehicles
1/2 (Note: Although General Motors still was the largest automaker by sales by 2007, Toyota (including Lexus, Daihatsu, and Hino) had larger production of vehicles a year than G.M. for the first time already in 2006.)	General Motors	United States	9,349,818
1/2	Toyota (plus Lexus, Daihatsu, and Hino)	Japan	8,534,690 (9,497,754)
3	Volkswagen Group	Germany	6,267,891
4 (Note: Ford owned a 33.4 % controlling-stake in Mazda 1996 to 2008. OICA, however, lists Mazda separately from Ford. Including Mazda's production, Ford would still be the 2nd-largest auto manufacturer, larger than Toyota (with Lexus, Daihatsu, and Hino), by 2004, as well as the 3rd largest, larger than the Volkswagen Group, in 2007 (and possibly the first half of 2008).)	Ford (with Mazda)	United States	6,247,506 (7,534,236)
5	Hyundai Motor Group (Hyundai with Kia)	South Korea	3,987,055
6	Honda	Japan	3,911,814
7	PSA Peugeot Citroën	France	3,457,385
8	Nissan	Japan	3,431,398
9	Fiat	Italy	2,679,451
10	Renault	France	2,669,040
11	Suzuki	Japan	2,596,316
12	Chrysler	United States	2,538,624
13	Daimler	Germany	2,096,977
14	BMW	Germany	1,541,503
15	Mitsubishi	Japan	1,411,975
16	Mazda	Japan	1,286,730
17	AvtoVAZ	Russia	735,897
18	FAW Group	China	690,712
19	Tata	India	588,158
20	Subaru	Japan	585,028

=== 2006 ===
This is a list of the 20 largest automotive manufacturers, ranked by their production volume in 2006.

Rank	Group	Country	Vehicles
1/2	General Motors	United States	8,926,160
1/2	Toyota (plus Lexus, Daihatsu, and Hino)	Japan	8,036,010 (9,221,357)
3	Ford (with Mazda)	United States	6,268,193 (7,664,605)
4	Volkswagen Group	Germany	5,684,603
5	Hyundai Motor Group (Hyundai with Kia)	South Korea	3,775,749
6	Honda	Japan	3,669,514
7	PSA Peugeot Citroën	France	3,356,859
8	Nissan (Note: Including production figures from Nissan Diesel as a Nissan subsidiary until 2006 (sold to Volvo in 2007).)	Japan	3,266,205
9	Chrysler	United States	2,544,590 (Note: DaimlerChrysler was split in 2007. However, OICA began to list them separately already in 2006.)
10	Renault	France	2,543,649
11	Fiat	Italy	2,319,642
12	Suzuki	Japan	2,297,277
13	Daimler	Germany	2,044,533
14	Mazda	Japan	1,396,412
15	BMW	Germany	1,366,838
16	Mitsubishi	Japan	1,313,409
17	AvtoVAZ	Russia	765,627
18	Subaru	Japan	587,274
19	Tata	India	561,761
20	Isuzu	Japan	523,648

=== 2005 ===
This is a list of the 20 largest automotive manufacturers, ranked by their production volume in 2005.

Rank	Group	Country	Total	Cars	LCV	HCV	Buses
1	General Motors (with GM Daewoo) (Note: GM Daewoo became a subsidiary of General Motors in 2002. However, OICA listed it separately before 2006.)	United States	7,943,304 (9,097,855)	4,526,312 (5,654,225)	3,374,782 (3,383,084)	42,210 (46,786)	— (10,760)
2	Toyota (with Lexus, Daihatsu, and Hino)	Japan	7,338,314 (8,446,944)	6,157,038 (6,960,214)	943,129 (1,143,245)	185,910 (285,979)	52,237 (57,506)
3	Ford	United States	6,497,746 (Note: With Mazda: 7,785,307)	3,514,496	2,903,920	79,330	
4	Volkswagen Group	Germany	5,211,413	4,979,487	193,864	32,563	5,499
5	DaimlerChrysler	Germany / United States	4,815,593	1,965,410	2,353,989	435,535	60,659
6	Nissan	Japan	3,535,345	2,697,362	651,301	179,105	7,577
7	Honda	Japan	3,436,164	3,324,282	48,642	63,240	
8	PSA Peugeot Citroën	France	3,375,366	2,982,690	392,676		
9	Hyundai Motor Group (Hyundai with Kia)	South Korea	3,091,060	2,726,600	126,836	137,995	99,629
10	Renault	France	2,616,818	2,195,162	421,656		
11	Suzuki	Japan	2,071,707	1,723,022	348,685		
12	Fiat	Italy	2,037,695	1,539,576	394,900	81,632	21,587
13	Mitsubishi	Japan	1,331,060	998,043	328,992	4,025	
14	BMW	Germany	1,323,119	1,323,119			
15	Mazda	Japan	1,287,561	1,091,756	193,374	2,431	
16	AvtoVAZ	Russia	721,492	721,492			
17	Dongfeng (Note: Dongfeng production excluding joint venture with Citroën)	China	593,055		403,055	180,000	10,000
18	Subaru	Japan	591,825	508,281	83,544		
19	BAIC (Note: BAIC production excluding joint ventures with Hyundai and Isuzu)	China	559,190		559,190		
20	FAW Group	China	721,492	721,492			

=== 2003–2004 ===
This is a list of the 15 largest automakers by production in 2003 and 2004.

Rank (Note: As of 2003)	Group	Country	Vehicles (2003)	Vehicles (2004)
1	General Motors (incl. GM Daewoo)	United States	8,706,553	8,965,476
2/3	Ford	United States	6,566,089 (Note: With Mazda: 7,718,667)	6,644,024 (Note: With Mazda: 7,919,104)
2/3	Toyota	Japan	6,240,526 (Note: With Lexus, Daihatsu and Hino: 7,220,764)	6,814,554 (Note: With Lexus, Daihatsu and Hino: 7,874,694)
4	Volkswagen Group	Germany	5,024,032	5,095,480
5	DaimlerChrysler	Germany / United States	4,231,603	4,627,883
6	PSA Peugeot Citroën	France	3,310,368	3,405,245
7/8 (Note: Nissan overtook Honda as the 7th largest in 2003.)	Nissan	Japan	2,981,154	3,230,326
7/8	Honda	Japan	2,922,526	3,237,434
9	Hyundai Motor Group (Hyundai with Kia)	South Korea	2,697,435	2,766,321
10	Renault	France	2,386,098	2,471,654
11	Fiat	Italy	2,077,828	2,119,717
12	Suzuki	Japan	1,811,214	1,976,824
13	Mitsubishi	Japan	1,582,205	1,428,563
14	Mazda	Japan	1,152,578	1,275,080
15	BMW	Germany	1,118,940	1,250,345

=== 2002 ===
This is a list of the 15 largest automakers by production in 2002.

Rank	Group	Country	Vehicles
1	General Motors (incl. GM Daewoo)	United States	8,732,742
2	Ford (with Mazda)	United States	6,729,499 (7,774,035)
3	Toyota (with Lexus, Daihatsu, and Hino)	Japan	5,744,156 (6,626,387)
4	Volkswagen Group	Germany	5,017,438
5	DaimlerChrysler	Germany / United States	4,456,325
6	PSA Peugeot Citroën	France	3,262,146
7	Honda	Japan	2,988,427
8	Nissan	Japan	2,745,596
9	Hyundai-Kia	South Korea	2,641,825
10	Renault	France	2,328,508
11	Fiat	Italy	2,190,595
12	Mitsubishi	Japan	1,821,466
13	Suzuki	Japan	1,703,959
14	BMW	Germany	1,090,258
15	Mazda	Japan	1,044,536

=== 2001 ===
This is a list of the 15 largest automakers by production in 2001.

Rank	Group	Country	Vehicles
1	General Motors (incl. Daewoo)	United States	8,086,250
2	Ford (with Mazda)	United States	6,676,491 (7,633,503)
3	Toyota (except Daihatsu/Hino)	Japan	6,054,968 (5,212,470)
4	Volkswagen Group	Germany	5,108,982
5	DaimlerChrysler	Germany / United States	4,364,492
6	PSA Peugeot Citroën	France	3,102,449
7	Honda	Japan	2,673,671
8	Nissan	Japan	2,558,979
9	Hyundai-Kia	South Korea	2,518,443
10	Fiat	Italy	2,409,016
11	Renault	France	2,375,084
12	Mitsubishi	Japan	1,647,817
13	Suzuki	Japan	1,541,103
14	Mazda	Japan	957,012
15	BMW	Germany	946,730

== See also ==
- Automotive industry
- List of countries by motor vehicle production
- List of countries by motor vehicle production in the 2000s
- List of countries by motor vehicle production in the 2010s
