= 2000s in economics =

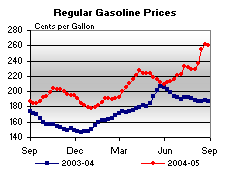
Government file from the DoE website

- Globalization: Multinational corporations become more pervasive, and anti-globalization protests occur frequently during meetings of International Monetary Fund (IMF) and World Trade Organization (WTO), especially in the early 2000s.
- The Euro becomes legal tender in twelve European Union countries in 2002. It is the largest monetary union in history. The euro eases trade in the Eurozone. By 2009, four more countries join the euro, Slovenia in 2007, Malta and Cyprus in 2008 and Slovakia in 2009.
- The Nasdaq, the American Stock Exchange and the New York Stock Exchange closed for six days after the September 11 attacks, the longest close since the Great Depression in 1929.
- The 2000s contained two recessions, according to the U.S. National Bureau of Economic Research: the early 2000s recession and the Great Recession.
- Major downturn in the value of dot-com company shares, with occasional exceptions (Google's IPO on August 13, 2004). The Internet continues to grow as a business and advertising medium, with steady increases in online shopping and banking activities. Other successful firms include Amazon.com and eBay.
- The United States' dominance over the world economy declines, with economically rising nations and organizations like China and India showing signs of becoming contending world powers.
- Oil price rises. Baku–Tbilisi–Ceyhan pipeline opens on May 25, 2005, potentially removing the dependence of the United States and other Western nations on Middle Eastern oil.
- Enron and other major accounting and corporate governance scandals prompt reviews of corporate government legislation worldwide (e.g., Sarbanes–Oxley Act)
- The 1990s stock market boom ends in mid-March to early September 2000 – 2001.
- Post-9/11 Recession from 2001 to 2002. The Dow Jones average would sink to the 7000 level during July 2002. Continuing stagnation in US and global monthly jobs growth afterwards. A recovery in US GDP growth begins after May 2003, but with continuing weakness on many indicators as of 2006.
- American automobile companies General Motors and Ford lose market share to Japanese Makes such as Toyota and Honda in the US. This trend of General Motors and Ford losing market share to Honda and Toyota started around 1998 in the US and still continues in 2006.
- By 2006, the U.S. economy had reached new heights, with the stock market increasing in value, home prices rising, and interest rates curbed. Gas prices lowered out by September 2006, further fueling economic prospects.
- The Dow Jones surpasses 12,000 for the first time in history, in mid-2006, and hits levels above 14,000 in 2007; however levels have dropped to around 8,000.
- In 2006–2007, the United States housing market made a sharp downturn, with home sales falling to levels not seen in a decade. Median home prices began slipping. The effects of the housing downturn on the overall economy are still being determined as of 2007, though by July–August 2007, worries over a "credit crunch" emerged and increasing numbers of economists and CEOs feared the economy would slip into a recession. The gross domestic product in the United States continued slowing in 2007.
- A barrel of oil peaked at $140 in mid-2008, and banks became less willing to lend money to each other. Inflation is already rising across many industrialized countries.
- The American housing market caused difficulty for the two mortgage brokers Fannie Mae and Freddie Mac, which have been subject to fears of collapse.
- Some economists have labeled the decade a "lost decade" because there were "zero economic gains for the typical American family."

== See also ==
- 2000s
- List of countries by motor vehicle production in the 2000s
