= List of countries by vehicle exports =

The following is a list of countries by exports of vehicles, including parts thereof (Harmonized System code 87).

== International Trade Centre ==
Data is for 2024, in thousands of United States dollars.

List of countries by vehicle exports (2024)
Country	Value exported (thousands USD)	Value imported (thousands USD)	Trade balance (thousands USD)
World	1,858,996,360	1,884,166,852	−25,170,492
Germany	280,475,009	141,499,360	138,975,649
China	224,063,343	69,627,297	154,436,046
Mexico	160,602,816	65,509,839	95,092,977
Japan	151,370,804	23,370,599	128,000,205
United States	144,023,208	391,924,659	−247,901,451
South Korea	95,360,918	20,464,181	74,896,737
Spain	59,962,549	47,517,264	12,445,285
Belgium	59,949,739	62,643,221	−2,693,482
Canada	58,025,722	90,423,645	−32,397,923
France	55,573,637	80,304,952	−24,731,315
Czech Republic	54,050,740	23,304,926	30,745,814
United Kingdom	48,303,019	88,890,000	−40,586,981
Italy	47,008,486	59,564,649	−12,556,163
Poland	41,164,358	40,035,713	1,128,645
Slovakia	38,549,721	19,766,076	18,783,645
Thailand	33,741,459	11,068,459	22,673,000
Turkey	31,945,201	31,766,400	178,801
Hungary	28,342,014	15,494,309	12,847,705
Sweden	26,452,888	19,861,148	6,591,740
Netherlands	24,560,854	34,735,513	−10,174,659
India	22,135,958	8,622,717	13,513,241
Austria	20,296,909	22,685,295	−2,388,386
Romania	17,319,727	13,943,658	3,376,069
South Africa	12,570,385	7,170,589	5,399,796
Brazil	11,896,447	23,348,091	−11,451,644
Taiwan	11,200,994	11,810,776	−609,782
Indonesia	11,073,384	9,794,057	1,279,327
Portugal	10,351,980	13,792,021	−3,440,041
Vietnam	9,893,484	11,900,836	−2,007,352
Morocco	8,586,859	6,247,031	2,339,828
Argentina	5,408,672	9,003,977	−3,595,305
Slovenia	5,325,982	5,516,152	−190,170
Denmark	4,791,203	11,843,714	−7,052,511
Finland	3,808,193	7,186,918	−3,378,725
Hong Kong	3,693,339	5,597,143	−1,903,804
Singapore	3,135,308	4,672,463	−1,537,155
Switzerland	2,984,995	19,072,932	−16,087,937
Malaysia	2,440,313	8,186,775	−5,746,462
Lithuania	2,422,938	4,718,606	−2,295,668
Saudi Arabia	1,683,880	26,280,718	−24,596,838
Estonia	1,682,661	2,760,149	−1,077,488
Kuwait	1,597,950	5,592,063	−3,994,113
Australia	1,597,734	42,630,019	−41,032,285
Bulgaria	1,595,794	3,609,031	−2,013,237
Luxembourg	1,584,733	3,702,352	−2,117,619
Norway	1,384,806	10,067,262	−8,682,456
Croatia	1,096,746	3,725,807	−2,629,061
Serbia	1,044,307	2,021,437	−977,130
United Arab Emirates	1,025,920	29,817,631	−28,791,711
Latvia	1,025,808	2,055,489	−1,029,681
Philippines	1,012,996	9,694,261	−8,681,265
Tunisia	797,028	1,559,652	−762,624
Russia	739,216	29,330,681	−28,591,465
Ireland	650,686	7,051,149	−6,400,463
Uzbekistan	636,546	5,644,897	−5,008,351
Cambodia	519,680	1,721,771	−1,202,091
Uruguay	505,411	1,806,566	−1,301,155
Colombia	486,527	5,058,925	−4,572,398
Kazakhstan	365,836	6,438,497	−6,072,661
Bosnia and Herzegovina	356,836	1,232,011	−875,175
Belarus	352,756	4,456,794	−4,104,038
Panama	352,296	1,605,011	−1,252,715
North Macedonia	346,546	662,879	−316,333
Greece	319,196	4,940,568	−4,621,372
Chile	312,176	7,812,595	−7,500,419
New Zealand	308,799	5,223,608	−4,914,809
Egypt	242,715	4,878,892	−4,636,177
Azerbaijan	187,204	2,193,175	−2,005,971
Israel	138,260	8,936,751	−8,798,491
Uganda	113,504	858,156	−744,652
Bangladesh	110,626	1,355,011	−1,244,385
Armenia	104,651	621,757	−517,106
Peru	95,754	4,789,480	−4,693,726
Pakistan	90,484	1,731,038	−1,640,554
Kenya	90,032	1,203,216	−1,113,184
Tanzania	89,080	1,750,320	−1,661,240
Ukraine	86,841	7,550,554	−7,463,713
Kyrgyzstan	85,615	2,277,797	−2,192,182
Togo	82,773	328,492	−245,719
Guatemala	71,450	2,905,071	−2,833,621
Zambia	62,416	1,190,790	−1,128,374
Honduras	62,028	1,551,293	−1,489,265
Oman	59,966	2,949,642	−2,889,676
Moldova	54,125	802,341	−748,216
Sri Lanka	49,442	254,961	−205,519
Côte d'Ivoire	48,941	1,111,013	−1,062,072
Albania	47,812	965,282	−917,470
Namibia	45,459	688,767	−643,308
Senegal	41,537	687,052	−645,515
Iran	33,242	1,934,878	−1,901,636
Gibraltar	33,120	66,247	−33,127
Botswana	27,608	518,096	−490,488
El Salvador	25,424	1,085,753	−1,060,329
Burkina Faso	24,350	355,845	−331,495
Jordan	24,095	2,705,998	−2,681,903
Cyprus	22,381	1,031,381	−1,009,000
Mali	19,984	345,740	−325,756
Myanmar	18,997	352,001	−333,004
Costa Rica	18,309	2,185,490	−2,167,181
Dominican Republic	18,109	2,721,475	−2,703,366
Mongolia	17,708	2,245,546	−2,227,838
Montenegro	15,830	423,822	−407,992
Laos	15,163	915,942	−900,779
Tokelau	14,678	207	14,471
Georgia	14,529	152,645	−138,116
Central African Republic	14,162	94,273	−80,111
Andorra	13,857	323,826	−309,969
Lesotho	13,419	110,534	−97,115
Iceland	12,288	752,967	−740,679
Malawi	12,139	234,300	−222,161
North Korea	11,542	18	11,524
Nigeria	11,282	2,965,637	−2,954,355
Jamaica	10,702	637,615	−626,913
Barbados	10,616	154,536	−143,920
Malta	10,239	382,473	−372,234
New Caledonia	9,800	111,346	−101,546
Ghana	9,471	1,543,353	−1,533,882
Papua New Guinea	8,726	434,572	−425,846
Faroe Islands	8,132	89,768	−81,636
Trinidad and Tobago	8,119	603,884	−595,765
Qatar	7,817	3,338,905	−3,331,088
Ecuador	7,437	2,106,723	−2,099,286
Burundi	7,247	100,802	−93,555
Bahrain	7,023	1,232,272	−1,225,249
Benin	6,663	137,570	−130,907
Bahamas	6,624	279,677	−273,053
Niger	6,608	101,118	−94,510
Mauritius	6,242	681,488	−675,246
Mozambique	5,949	655,413	−649,464
Angola	5,769	770,390	−764,621
Lebanon	5,734	900,008	−894,274
Macao	5,551	350,775	−345,224
Sierra Leone	4,540	139,588	−135,048
Fiji	4,368	217,398	−213,030
Grenada	4,348	51,524	−47,176
Turkmenistan	4,278	226,095	−221,817
Zimbabwe	4,223	773,151	−768,928
Somalia	4,221	107,981	−103,760
Guyana	4,176	504,475	−500,299
Bolivia	3,620	778,223	−774,603
Afghanistan	3,503	304,265	−300,762
Suriname	3,389	184,553	−181,164
Brunei	3,000	84,207	−81,207
Sao Tome and Principe	2,934	3,995	−1,061
British Virgin Islands	2,396	27,353	−24,957
Rwanda	2,342	158,882	−156,540
United States Minor Outlying Islands	2,100	100,275	−98,175
Tajikistan	1,997	871,051	−869,054
Cameroon	1,990	504,966	−502,976
Nicaragua	1,879	915,780	−913,901
Greenland	1,840	47,760	−45,920
Guinea	1,734	846,954	−845,220
Antigua and Barbuda	1,591	63,607	−62,016
DR Congo	1,511	1,096,842	−1,095,331
Algeria	1,443	4,008,558	−4,007,115
Gambia	1,110	105,980	−104,870
Saint Lucia	1,086	104,466	−103,380
Libya	1,053	1,418,157	−1,417,104
Belize	1,037	88,281	−87,244
Solomon Islands	1,015	43,024	−42,009
Ethiopia	940	291,233	−290,293
Sint Maarten (Dutch part)	900	35,212	−34,312
Venezuela	894	1,129,918	−1,129,024
Madagascar	871	282,807	−281,936
Curaçao	805	148,872	−148,067
Cuba	789	290,972	−290,183
Eswatini	778	121,055	−120,277
Mauritania	761	306,167	−305,406
Gabon	705	201,931	−201,226
Iraq	673	5,076,849	−5,076,176
Congo	642	242,151	−241,509
Saint Vincent and the Grenadines	599	25,480	−24,881
Sudan	549	223,774	−223,225
Nepal	498	659,311	−658,813
Marshall Islands	472	10,746	−10,274
Djibouti	448	587,073	−586,625
British Indian Ocean Territory	359	761	−402
Syria	355	48,143	−47,788
Nauru	352	5,341	−4,989
Anguilla	342	6,382	−6,040
Seychelles	309	84,503	−84,194
Yemen	286	467,357	−467,071
Bonaire, Sint Eustatius and Saba	234	3,865	−3,631
Aruba	205	98,101	−97,896
Saint Kitts and Nevis	205	22,922	−22,717
Tonga	204	19,543	−19,339
Cocos (Keeling) Islands	191	1,135	−944
Cayman Islands	167	85,085	−84,918
Cook Islands	165	9,294	−9,129
French Southern and Antarctic Territories	154	4,766	−4,612
Equatorial Guinea	141	34,268	−34,127
Saint Pierre and Miquelon	141	5,645	−5,504
Bermuda	132	53,215	−53,083
Guinea-Bissau	102	15,329	−15,227
South Sudan	98	49,854	−49,756
Dominica	94	21,228	−21,134
Montserrat	90	2,367	−2,277
Turks and Caicos Islands	89	51,381	−51,292
Chad	84	71,035	−70,951
Wallis and Futuna	74	1,568	−1,494
Bhutan	72	52,880	−52,808
Christmas Island	68	6,252	−6,184
Tuvalu	66	4,373	−4,307
Saint Helena	65	4,692	−4,627
Niue	64	2,141	−2,077
Timor-Leste	57	117,587	−117,530
Samoa	56	37,501	−37,445
Liberia	55	124,189	−124,134
Norfolk Island	49	1,657	−1,608
Kiribati	45	14,943	−14,898
Haiti	43	73,189	−73,146
French Polynesia	37	98,982	−98,945
Micronesia	37	10,160	−10,123
Paraguay	34	1,585,092	−1,585,058
Falkland Islands	33	30,062	−30,029
Comoros	29	16,301	−16,272
Eritrea	27	16,329	−16,302
Northern Mariana Islands	24	11,450	−11,426
Western Sahara	14	635	−621
Palestine	12	88,040	−88,028
Vanuatu	12	37,902	−37,890
Pitcairn	8	356	−348
Palau	5	9,039	−9,034
British Antarctic Territory	2	0	2

== Observatory of Economic Complexity ==
Data is for 2023, in thousands of United States dollars.

List of countries by vehicle exports (2023)
Country	Trade value
Germany	296,592,617
China	188,468,006
Japan	164,627,135
Mexico	155,959,504
United States	147,871,528
South Korea	84,769,589
Spain	68,416,179
France	64,022,037
Canada	63,597,528
Italy	54,378,151
Czech Republic	53,244,400
United Kingdom	49,303,238
Slovakia	47,221,080
Belgium	44,378,211
Thailand	39,904,034
Poland	38,421,669
Turkey	31,642,295
Netherlands	31,445,177
Sweden	30,497,020
Hungary	26,588,733
Austria	22,951,241
India	22,097,313
Romania	19,049,515
South Africa	16,213,500
Brazil	12,773,116
Taiwan	12,205,612
Indonesia	11,743,231
United Arab Emirates	11,714,776
Portugal	11,306,987
Singapore	10,738,888
Morocco	8,715,766
Argentina	8,108,585
Slovenia	6,269,195
Denmark	5,428,005
Vietnam	4,787,790
Finland	4,756,044
Lithuania	3,001,314
Switzerland	2,926,245
Malaysia	2,285,698
Estonia	1,778,375
Bulgaria	1,683,823
Norway	1,673,517
Australia	1,408,348
Luxembourg	1,391,668
Serbia	1,251,765
Latvia	1,045,996
Saudi Arabia	960,131
Hong Kong	862,234
Croatia	796,623
Russia	794,540
Kuwait	794,039
North Macedonia	774,445
Tunisia	749,161
Philippines	708,684
Ireland	654,438
Cambodia	647,629
Oman	635,173
Kazakhstan	592,178
Colombia	550,491
Uzbekistan	538,906
Armenia	518,124
Uruguay	406,636
Bahrain	397,041
Greece	384,231
Chile	379,094
Bosnia and Herzegovina	332,230
New Zealand	290,158
Belarus	279,334
Israel	266,342
Egypt	214,314
Azerbaijan	183,758
Zambia	179,891
Ukraine	173,834
Tokelau	147,085
Kyrgyzstan	135,882
Kenya	120,128
Bangladesh	107,201
Sri Lanka	96,954
Pakistan	84,809
Uganda	83,524
Peru	74,234
Guatemala	70,129
Qatar	64,152
Moldova	63,926
Honduras	61,540
Jordan	61,349
Tanzania	59,100
Dominican Republic	47,385
Andorra	47,125
Malta	42,503
Georgia	40,216
Cote d'Ivoire	39,201
Cyprus	37,214
Burkina Faso	37,142
Albania	35,416
Namibia	32,828
Costa Rica	30,096
Myanmar	29,663
Mauritius	27,298
Macau	26,610
Iran	26,118
Nigeria	22,641
El Salvador	21,118
Senegal	20,987
Montenegro	19,161
Panama	18,729
Botswana	18,622
Iceland	18,326
Gibraltar	16,600
Togo	12,758
Mozambique	12,485
Benin	10,245
Jamaica	9,128
Gabon	8,799
Eswatini	8,252
Lebanon	7,960
Paraguay	7,422
Niger	7,137
Curacao	7,130
Ghana	6,682
North Korea	6,660
Ethiopia	6,495
Lesotho	6,494
Mali	6,440
Ecuador	6,144
Sao Tome and Principe	4,764
Bolivia	4,581
Malawi	4,568
Seychelles	4,488
Bahamas	4,267
Brunei	4,235
Nicaragua	4,080
British Virgin Islands	4,058
Yemen	4,056
Zimbabwe	4,050
Saint Helena	3,887
Laos	3,713
Papua New Guinea	3,668
New Caledonia	3,577
Anguilla	3,387
Sierra Leone	3,172
Algeria	3,060
Turkmenistan	2,950
Fiji	2,648
Mongolia	2,492
Angola	2,392
Suriname	2,127
Guinea	1,996
Barbados	1,916
Gambia	1,795
Liberia	1,727
San Marino	1,727
Greenland	1,704
Mauritania	1,612
Tajikistan	1,471
Belize	1,406
Rwanda	1,331
Cameroon	1,239
Libya	1,231
Marshall Islands	1,178
Trinidad and Tobago	1,117
Madagascar	1,101
Afghanistan	995
DR Congo	966
Syria	949
Cocos (Keeling) Islands	907
Saint Lucia	905
Saint Vincent and the Grenadines	866
Iraq	785
Somalia	771
American Samoa	688
Venezuela	668
Djibouti	596
Cuba	517
Congo	431
French Polynesia	405
Saint Barthelemy	390
Aruba	370
South Sudan	326
Equatorial Guinea	324
Micronesia	291
Antigua and Barbuda	275
Comoros	235
Bonaire	227
Haiti	222
Dominica	217
Turks and Caicos Islands	197
Tonga	193
Nepal	192
Wallis and Futuna	191
Norfolk Island	189
Cayman Islands	174
Saint Martin	168
Guyana	164
Sudan	152
Guinea-Bissau	143
Guam	141
Central African Republic	121
Nauru	109
Maldives	99
Solomon Islands	95
Cape Verde	90
Bermuda	84
Vanuatu	64
Grenada	61
Eritrea	56
Chad	42
Falkland Islands	39
Saint Pierre and Miquelon	35
British Indian Ocean Territory	35
Burundi	35
Samoa	34
Cook Islands	31
Saint Kitts and Nevis	28
Christmas Island	26
Timor-Leste	24
Tuvalu	24
French South Antarctic Territory	17
Kiribati	16
Niue	13
Pitcairn Islands	11
Montserrat	11
Bhutan	9
Palestine	4
Palau	3
Northern Mariana Islands	2

== Top exporters of vehicles by categories ==
The five largest exporters of different vehicle categories in 2023:

Product category (code)	Global exports (in millions USD)	Rank	Country	Exports (in millions USD)
Tractors (8701)	87,184	1	Germany	13,892
Tractors (8701)	87,184	2	Mexico	13,442
Tractors (8701)	87,184	3	Netherlands	8,532
Tractors (8701)	87,184	4	United States	7,917
Tractors (8701)	87,184	5	China	7,552
Motor vehicles for the transport of 10 or more persons, incl. driver (8702)	18,589	1	China	4,432
Motor vehicles for the transport of 10 or more persons, incl. driver (8702)	18,589	2	Turkey	2,318
Motor vehicles for the transport of 10 or more persons, incl. driver (8702)	18,589	3	Japan	2,299
Motor vehicles for the transport of 10 or more persons, incl. driver (8702)	18,589	4	Poland	1,605
Motor vehicles for the transport of 10 or more persons, incl. driver (8702)	18,589	5	Czech Republic	1,024
Motor cars and other motor vehicles principally designed for the transport of 10 or fewer persons, incl. station wagons and racing cars (excl. motor vehicles of heading 8702) (8703)	958,738	1	Germany	177,225
Motor cars and other motor vehicles principally designed for the transport of 10 or fewer persons, incl. station wagons and racing cars (excl. motor vehicles of heading 8702) (8703)	958,738	2	Japan	110,937
Motor cars and other motor vehicles principally designed for the transport of 10 or fewer persons, incl. station wagons and racing cars (excl. motor vehicles of heading 8702) (8703)	958,738	3	China	77,659
Motor cars and other motor vehicles principally designed for the transport of 10 or fewer persons, incl. station wagons and racing cars (excl. motor vehicles of heading 8702) (8703)	958,738	4	South Korea	68,680
Motor cars and other motor vehicles principally designed for the transport of 10 or fewer persons, incl. station wagons and racing cars (excl. motor vehicles of heading 8702) (8703)	958,738	5	United States	52,261
Motor vehicles for the transport of goods, incl. chassis with engine and cab (8704)	185,642	1	Mexico	37,725
Motor vehicles for the transport of goods, incl. chassis with engine and cab (8704)	185,642	2	United States	32,725
Motor vehicles for the transport of goods, incl. chassis with engine and cab (8704)	185,642	3	Germany	28,986
Motor vehicles for the transport of goods, incl. chassis with engine and cab (8704)	185,642	4	China	21,621
Motor vehicles for the transport of goods, incl. chassis with engine and cab (8704)	185,642	5	France	10,345
Special purpose motor vehicles (8705)	16,599	1	Germany	4,510
Special purpose motor vehicles (8705)	16,599	2	China	3,000
Special purpose motor vehicles (8705)	16,599	3	United States	2,111
Special purpose motor vehicles (8705)	16,599	4	Italy	1,485
Special purpose motor vehicles (8705)	16,599	5	Thailand	696
Chassis fitted with engines for motor vehicles (8706)	2,508	1	Brazil	421
Chassis fitted with engines for motor vehicles (8706)	2,508	2	Sweden	352
Chassis fitted with engines for motor vehicles (8706)	2,508	3	China	289
Chassis fitted with engines for motor vehicles (8706)	2,508	4	Japan	250
Chassis fitted with engines for motor vehicles (8706)	2,508	5	India	243
Bodies, incl. cabs, for tractors, motor vehicles for the transport of ten or more persons, motor cars and other motor vehicles principally designed for the transport of persons, motor vehicles for the transport of goods and special purpose motor vehicles (8707)	10,183	1	China	1,546
Bodies, incl. cabs, for tractors, motor vehicles for the transport of ten or more persons, motor cars and other motor vehicles principally designed for the transport of persons, motor vehicles for the transport of goods and special purpose motor vehicles (8707)	10,183	2	Germany	1,545
Bodies, incl. cabs, for tractors, motor vehicles for the transport of ten or more persons, motor cars and other motor vehicles principally designed for the transport of persons, motor vehicles for the transport of goods and special purpose motor vehicles (8707)	10,183	3	Belgium	1,203
Bodies, incl. cabs, for tractors, motor vehicles for the transport of ten or more persons, motor cars and other motor vehicles principally designed for the transport of persons, motor vehicles for the transport of goods and special purpose motor vehicles (8707)	10,183	3	Sweden	1,181
Bodies, incl. cabs, for tractors, motor vehicles for the transport of ten or more persons, motor cars and other motor vehicles principally designed for the transport of persons, motor vehicles for the transport of goods and special purpose motor vehicles (8707)	10,183	5	Japan	485
Parts and accessories for tractors, motor vehicles for the transport of ten or more persons, motor cars and other motor vehicles principally designed for the transport of persons, motor vehicles for the transport of goods and special purpose motor vehicles of heading (8708)	471,583	1	Germany	66,855
Parts and accessories for tractors, motor vehicles for the transport of ten or more persons, motor cars and other motor vehicles principally designed for the transport of persons, motor vehicles for the transport of goods and special purpose motor vehicles of heading (8708)	471,583	2	China	65,536
Parts and accessories for tractors, motor vehicles for the transport of ten or more persons, motor cars and other motor vehicles principally designed for the transport of persons, motor vehicles for the transport of goods and special purpose motor vehicles of heading (8708)	471,583	3	United States	57,704
Parts and accessories for tractors, motor vehicles for the transport of ten or more persons, motor cars and other motor vehicles principally designed for the transport of persons, motor vehicles for the transport of goods and special purpose motor vehicles of heading (8708)	471,583	4	Mexico	55,504
Parts and accessories for tractors, motor vehicles for the transport of ten or more persons, motor cars and other motor vehicles principally designed for the transport of persons, motor vehicles for the transport of goods and special purpose motor vehicles of heading (8708)	471,583	5	Japan	47,594
Works trucks, self−propelled, not fitted with lifting or handling equipment, of the type used in factories, warehouses, dock areas, or airports for short−distance transport of goods; tractors of the type used on railway station platforms; parts of the preceding vehicles (8709)	1,838	1	United States	402
Works trucks, self−propelled, not fitted with lifting or handling equipment, of the type used in factories, warehouses, dock areas, or airports for short−distance transport of goods; tractors of the type used on railway station platforms; parts of the preceding vehicles (8709)	1,838	2	Germany	316
Works trucks, self−propelled, not fitted with lifting or handling equipment, of the type used in factories, warehouses, dock areas, or airports for short−distance transport of goods; tractors of the type used on railway station platforms; parts of the preceding vehicles (8709)	1,838	3	China	250
Works trucks, self−propelled, not fitted with lifting or handling equipment, of the type used in factories, warehouses, dock areas, or airports for short−distance transport of goods; tractors of the type used on railway station platforms; parts of the preceding vehicles (8709)	1,838	4	France	129
Works trucks, self−propelled, not fitted with lifting or handling equipment, of the type used in factories, warehouses, dock areas, or airports for short−distance transport of goods; tractors of the type used on railway station platforms; parts of the preceding vehicles (8709)	1,838	5	India	126
Tanks and other armoured fighting vehicles, motorised, whether or not fitted with weapons, and parts of such vehicles (8710)	4,524	1	Canada	1,723
Tanks and other armoured fighting vehicles, motorised, whether or not fitted with weapons, and parts of such vehicles (8710)	4,524	2	United States	1,081
Tanks and other armoured fighting vehicles, motorised, whether or not fitted with weapons, and parts of such vehicles (8710)	4,524	3	South Korea	414
Tanks and other armoured fighting vehicles, motorised, whether or not fitted with weapons, and parts of such vehicles (8710)	4,524	4	Spain	333
Tanks and other armoured fighting vehicles, motorised, whether or not fitted with weapons, and parts of such vehicles (8710)	4,524	5	United Kingdom	170
Motorcycles, incl. mopeds, and cycles fitted with an auxiliary motor, with or without side−cars; side−cars (8711)	42,155	1	China	11,591
Motorcycles, incl. mopeds, and cycles fitted with an auxiliary motor, with or without side−cars; side−cars (8711)	42,155	2	Germany	3,572
Motorcycles, incl. mopeds, and cycles fitted with an auxiliary motor, with or without side−cars; side−cars (8711)	42,155	3	Japan	3,510
Motorcycles, incl. mopeds, and cycles fitted with an auxiliary motor, with or without side−cars; side−cars (8711)	42,155	4	Thailand	3,476
Motorcycles, incl. mopeds, and cycles fitted with an auxiliary motor, with or without side−cars; side−cars (8711)	42,155	5	India	2,617
Bicycles and other cycles, incl. delivery tricycles, not motorised (8712)	9,692	1	China	2,630
Bicycles and other cycles, incl. delivery tricycles, not motorised (8712)	9,692	2	Taiwan	1,393
Bicycles and other cycles, incl. delivery tricycles, not motorised (8712)	9,692	3	Germany	962
Bicycles and other cycles, incl. delivery tricycles, not motorised (8712)	9,692	4	Netherlands	689
Bicycles and other cycles, incl. delivery tricycles, not motorised (8712)	9,692	5	Cambodia	417
Carriages for disabled persons, whether or not motorised or otherwise mechanically propelled (excl. specially designed motor vehicles and bicycles) (8713)	1,993	1	China	1,060
Carriages for disabled persons, whether or not motorised or otherwise mechanically propelled (excl. specially designed motor vehicles and bicycles) (8713)	1,993	2	Germany	149
Carriages for disabled persons, whether or not motorised or otherwise mechanically propelled (excl. specially designed motor vehicles and bicycles) (8713)	1,993	3	Taiwan	110
Carriages for disabled persons, whether or not motorised or otherwise mechanically propelled (excl. specially designed motor vehicles and bicycles) (8713)	1,993	4	United States	87
Carriages for disabled persons, whether or not motorised or otherwise mechanically propelled (excl. specially designed motor vehicles and bicycles) (8713)	1,993	5	Netherlands	79
Parts and accessories for motorcycles and bicycles and for carriages for disabled persons (8714)	28,612	1	China	10,466
Parts and accessories for motorcycles and bicycles and for carriages for disabled persons (8714)	28,612	2	Taiwan	6,120
Parts and accessories for motorcycles and bicycles and for carriages for disabled persons (8714)	28,612	3	Japan	1,609
Parts and accessories for motorcycles and bicycles and for carriages for disabled persons (8714)	28,612	4	Italy	1,492
Parts and accessories for motorcycles and bicycles and for carriages for disabled persons (8714)	28,612	5	Germany	1,269
Baby carriages and parts thereof (8715)	2,451	1	China	1,652
Baby carriages and parts thereof (8715)	2,451	2	Netherlands	198
Baby carriages and parts thereof (8715)	2,451	3	Germany	184
Baby carriages and parts thereof (8715)	2,451	4	Poland	112
Baby carriages and parts thereof (8715)	2,451	5	Italy	57
Trailers and semi−trailers; other vehicles, not mechanically propelled (excl. railway and tramway vehicles); parts thereof (8716)	39,769	1	Germany	7,372
Trailers and semi−trailers; other vehicles, not mechanically propelled (excl. railway and tramway vehicles); parts thereof (8716)	39,769	2	China	6,462
Trailers and semi−trailers; other vehicles, not mechanically propelled (excl. railway and tramway vehicles); parts thereof (8716)	39,769	3	United States	5,036
Trailers and semi−trailers; other vehicles, not mechanically propelled (excl. railway and tramway vehicles); parts thereof (8716)	39,769	4	Mexico	4,369
Trailers and semi−trailers; other vehicles, not mechanically propelled (excl. railway and tramway vehicles); parts thereof (8716)	39,769	5	Poland	2,058
