= Organisation Internationale des Constructeurs d'Automobiles =

International trade association

The International Organization of Motor Vehicle Manufacturers (OICA; French: Organisation Internationale des Constructeurs d'Automobiles), founded 1919 in Paris, is an international trade association whose members are 39 national automotive industry trade associations. OICA facilitates communication among its member national automotive industry trade associations and advocates for policies and position of mutual interest to its members at the international level and to the general public.

== UNECE ==
OICA hosts on its web site the working documents from various United Nations expert groups, including World Forum for Harmonization of Vehicle Regulations.

== Climate change ==
OICA recognizes anthropogenic climate change as "probably the greatest challenge facing society in the twenty-first century." OICA identifies motor vehicles as a significant factor, contributing about 16% of global man-made carbon dioxide emissions. OICA advocates for an integrated, global approach to global warming.

== Auto shows ==
The OICA coordinates scheduling for the following major auto shows. Bold denotes one of the "big five" most prestigious shows.

Note that only the passenger car segment is included in this list, while other exhibitions exist for heavy commercial vehicles:

Show name	City	Country	Month
**North American International Auto Show**	**Detroit**	USA	September
European Motor Show Brussels	Brussels	Belgium	January
Auto Expo	New Delhi	India	February (even years)
Belgrade International Motor Show	Belgrade	Serbia	March
**Geneva International Motor Show**	**Geneva**	Switzerland	March
Bangkok International Motor Show	Bangkok	Thailand	March/April
New York International Auto Show	New York	USA	March/April
AutoRAI	Amsterdam	Netherlands	April
Beijing International Automotive Exhibition	Beijing	China	April (even years)
Seoul Mobility Show	Seoul (KINTEX, Goyang)	South Korea	April (odd years)
Automobile Barcelona	Barcelona	Spain	May (odd years)
Salón del Automóvil de Buenos Aires	Buenos Aires	Argentina	June (odd years)
Moscow International Automobile Salon	Moscow	Russia	August–September
**Internationale Automobil-Ausstellung**	Hanover	Germany	September (even years, commercial)
**Internationale Automobil-Ausstellung**	**Munich**	Germany	September (odd years)
**Mondial de l'Automobile**	**Paris**	France	October (even years)
Sofia Motor Show	Sofia	Bulgaria	October (odd years)
Los Angeles Auto Show	Los Angeles	USA	November
**Tokyo Motor Show**	**Tokyo**	Japan	December (odd years)
Bologna Motor Show	Bologna	Italy	December

== See also ==
- World Forum for Harmonization of Vehicle Regulations of the UNECE
