= Tolnai =

Tolnai or Tolnay is a Hungarian surname. Notable people with these surnames include:

== People named Tolnai ==
- Gábor Kornél Tolnai (1902–1982), Hungarian-Swedish engineer and inventor
- Ilona Tolnai-Rákhely (1921–2011), Hungarian sprinter
- Kálmán Tolnai (1924–2010), Hungarian sailor
- Márta Tolnai-Erdős (1941–2012), Hungarian gymnast
- Ottó Tolnai (1940–2025), Yugoslav and Hungarian writer, poet and translator
- Talida Tolnai (born 1979), Romanian handballer
- Tibor Tolnai (born 1964), Hungarian chess grandmaster and poker player

== People named Tolnay ==
- Ákos Tolnay (1903–1981), Hungarian screenwriter, active mainly in Italian cinema
- Charles de Tolnay (1899–1981), Hungarian art historian
- Emilie Tolnay (1901–1944), Austrian hairdresser, and a resistance activist
- Klári Tolnay (1914–1998), Hungarian actress
- Tiffany Tolnay (born 1987), American collegiate artistic gymnast

== See also ==
- World lexicon of Tolnai, a Hungarian encyclopedia (1912–1919)
- New world lexicon of Tolnai, a Hungarian encyclopedia (1926–1933)
