= Käthe Sasso =

Austrian child resistance activist (1926–2024)

Käthe Sasso (Austrian German pronunciation: [ˈkɛːtɛ ˈsaso]; née Smudits; 18 March 1926 – 14 April 2024) was an Austrian child resistance activist during World War II. As a concentration camp and death march survivor, she wrote several works that chronicle her experiences during Nazi rule in Germany.

== Early childhood ==
Smudits was born on 18 March 1926 in Vienna. Austria had been the focus of a multicultural empire until 1918: like many of her generation Käthe Smudits grew up bilingual. Her early childhood was spent in the little village of Nebersdorf with her grandmother, an ethnic Croat, in Burgenland, to the south of Vienna. When the time came to go to school she moved to live with her parents, Agnes and Johann Smudits, back in Vienna. The so-called self-elimination of the Austrian Parliament in March 1933 had eerie parallels with developments in Germany following the régime change in Berlin a couple of months earlier.

For many Austrians the 1920s, culminating in exacerbation of the austerity that had followed military defeat in 1918, had been a difficult and disappointing decade, and in 1933 there was a widespread hope that a post-democratic future under Austrofascism could hardly be worse. But there were others, mostly on the political left, who were appalled by the loss of democracy and the populist racism that accompanied it. Agnes and Johann Smudits were both politically committed, in opposing both Austrofascism and, after the annexation of 1938, the National Socialist ("Nazi") dictatorship. In their little apartment in south-central Vienna (10th district) resistance fighters were frequent guests. Because political opposition was becoming illegal, anti-government activists were increasingly forced to operate in secret and beyond the confines of mainstream society. Even as a young school girl Käthe was involved in the production of political leaflets for "distribution" in the city (for instance through being left on trains at the station near their home or on public benches along the streets or in parks).

=== Austrofascism ===
In February 1934, the brief but savagely repressed Austrian uprising was both a response to the cancellation of parliamentary democracy the previous year and a precursor to further repression of political opposition. Johann Smudits had participated in the uprising as a "Schutzbündler" (Social Democratic paramilitary) and was arrested as the uprising was put down. He was released after four weeks, but banished from living in Vienna with his wife and child. He was so disappointed by the irresolute reaction of the Social Democratic party leadership to the imposition of Fascist-style dictatorship that he switched his party allegiance to the Communist Party, which was also illegal, but had been preparing for "underground" operations since the mid-1920s, so became a focus for most of the still active left-wing government opponents in post-democratic Austria.

Looking back on these times after the National Socialist nightmare seemed to be over, Sasso, her own anti-capitalist credentials undimmed, would insist that people "had not understood or had not wished to understand that the problem was capitalism. Hitler had promised work and bread. That was because he had to build highways for the war and build up industry, unfortunately." (Note: "Dass der Kapitalismus die Schuld hat, haben sie nicht begriffen oder nicht begreifen wollen. Hitler hat ihnen Arbeit und Brot versprochen. Das hat er gehalten, denn er hat ja Straßen bauen müssen für den Krieg und die Industrie aufbauen, leider".)

== World War II ==
=== Orphan in the resistance ===
Käthe Smudits' mother died in July 1941. Her father had been conscripted into the Wehrmacht the previous year leaving Käthe's mother, already debilitated by illness, to do "everything", both in terms of looking after her child and in terms of the political work which she had previously been able to share with her husband. Käthe, now aged fifteen, remained active in the resistance group centred round Gustav Adolf Neustadl, as before. She knew the people and "had the contacts". Three principal activities of the group involved supporting the widows and dependents of executed resistance activists with food, monitoring foreign radio programmes (which was highly illegal) and distribution of antifascist literature (also illegal).

=== Arrest ===
However, it turned out that the security services had introduced a spy into the resistance group. On 22 August 1942, two Gestapo men appeared at the door. They searched the house thoroughly, but found nothing. When they left they took Käthe Smudits with them. Other group members arrested at around the same time included Emilie Tolnay, Therese Dworak, Rosalia Graf and her husband Johann Graf. They were all convicted under the usual charge of "preparing to commit high treason" ("Vorbereitung zum Hochverrat").

On account of her youth, Käthe Smudits was not executed. She was held in solitary confinement for a month, and subjected to further interrogation during the course of which, she believed, she managed to avoid disclosing anything important to her questioners. Her mother being already dead, she did not hesitate to incriminate her, but she took care to avoid incriminating her father who was still alive, despite having been conscripted into the army. She invented a fictitious group member called "Herbert" to whom she imputed responsibility for various apparent crimes. Two Gestapo men even drove with her in a black Gestapo car to the Vienna premises of Gräf & Stift, the vehicle manufacturer where, she had told them, Herbert was employed. However, as they all waited patiently in the car outside the factory entrance she failed to identify "Herbert".

=== Camp ===
In the end Käthe Smudits was held in Austria until September 1944. After being found guilty, but nevertheless narrowly avoiding a death sentence when she appeared at the Vienna District Court in January 1943, she was transferred to the Arbeitserziehungslager at Oberlanzendorf. The situation here was made difficult for her for an unexpected reason. All her fellow detainees were young Greek women. Recognised as a "German", Smudits enjoyed great privileges. She had a bed and blanket to herself, and a job in the adjacent SS barracks. Given the high levels of disease in the camps, this may have increased her chances of survival. But there was no opportunity to mix with her fellow inmates, who viewed her with obvious suspicion each day when she returned from her job at the barracks. She sensed that she was suspected of having been placed among them by the camp management as a spy. In the end she managed to obtain a transfer back to the "Liesl" prison in the heart of Vienna, where she had already been detained for the first four months following her arrest.

=== Ravensbrück ===
In September 1944 she was transferred to Berlin, and two weeks later, by now aged 18, deported to the Ravensbrück concentration camp, an all-women camp a short distance to the north of the German capital. She was prisoner number 72,572 at the camp. Prisoner number 400 was Hanna Sturm, who had been one of the camp's first inmates. Both women would survive the concentration camp, and they would become lifelong friends after the war ended. For the inmates it was important to work together. Older women were given work making stockings for the SS-women. A group of Austrian inmates arranged for additional women, often younger women, to be smuggled across to the barracks where this work was undertaken, in order to try to ensure that production quotas were met. Nevertheless, early in 1945, the German camp controllers began picking out older women for deportation to a recently established extermination facility in the nearby Uckermark district.

Inmates were able to obtain their own intelligence on when another selection process was imminent, and a frantic operation took place to dye the hair of grey haired inmates using a mixture comprising margarine, powdered stone and oak bark retrieved from the building operations to which some of the inmates had been sent. In this way a number of grey haired inmates avoided being sent for extermination. One of the older inmates, aged 50, was called Leopoldine Sasso: she had hair that was not merely grey but had gone completely white. Later Käthe Smudits would marry Leopoldine Sasso's son.

On 28 April 1945, Smudits was among the inmates sent out by the camp authorities on a so-called death march towards the camp at Bergen-Belsen to the west. This was a response by the German authorities to the seemingly unstoppable advance from the east of the Soviet forces which were already fighting their way into the suburbs of Berlin. On the first night of the march Käthe and her friend Mizzi Bosch managed to escape, after which they made their way on foot back towards Vienna. Their first experience of Vienna was anything but welcoming, however, when the two of them were thrown off a tram by the conductor because they had no money for a ticket. Mizzi Bosch died a year later as a result of the torture she had suffered in the camp.

== After the war ==
After the liberation Käthe Smudits remained in Vienna. In 1946 she married Josef Sasso, like her a surviving resistance activist. The marriage produced three children. Later they moved out of the city and settled in Lower Austria.

From the 1990s, Sasso made herself available as a surviving contemporary witness with regard to her experiences of National Socialism. On 5 May 2008, and again on 27 January 2013, she addressed commemoration rallies held in Vienna's Heldenplatz ("Heroes' Square") in the context of Holocaust commemoration events.

Sasso died on 14 April 2024, at the age of 98.
