= Jihlava =

- Statutory city
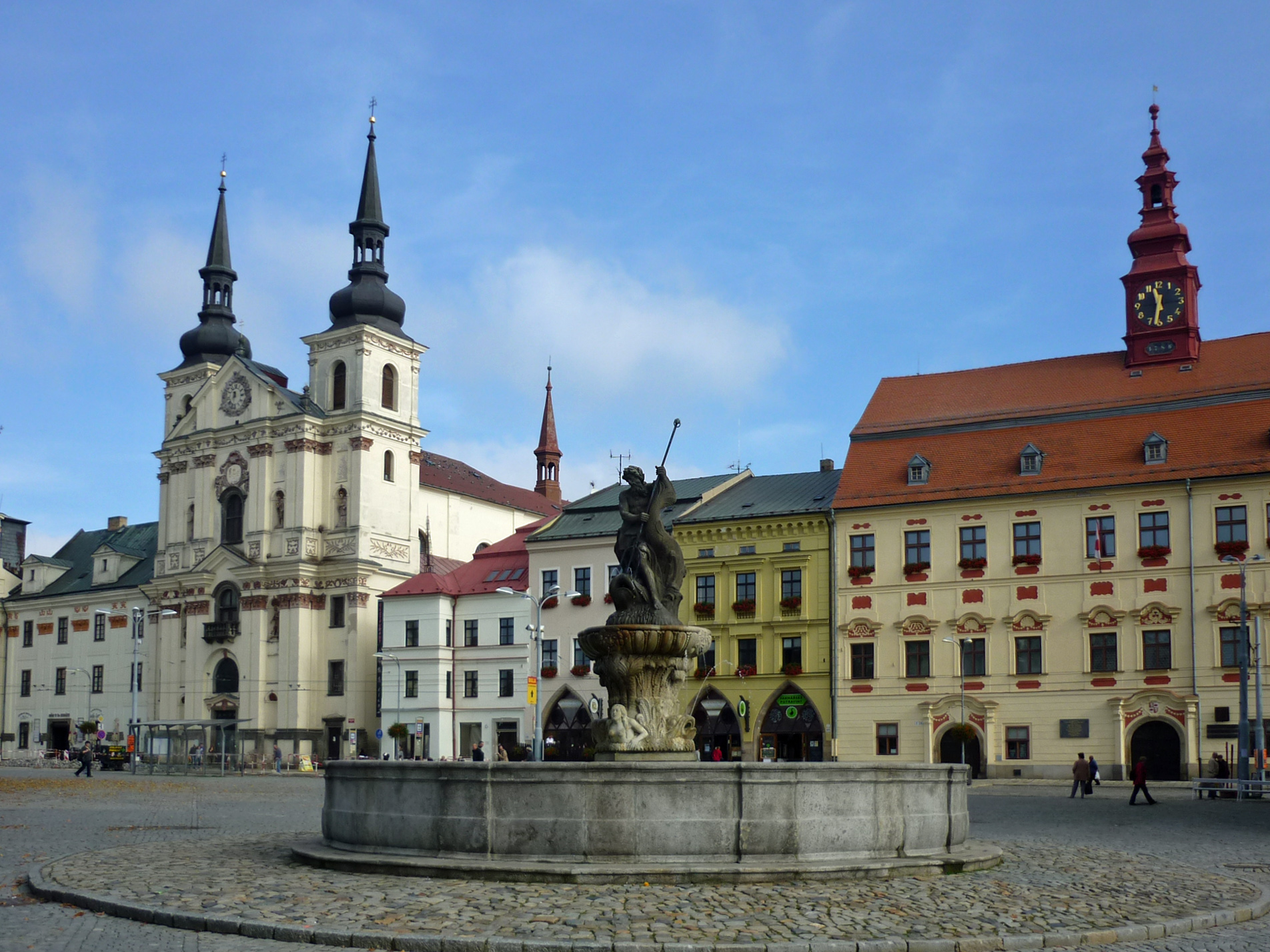
- Masarykovo náměstí with the Church of Saint Ignatius and the city hall

- Flag Coat of arms Wordmark

- Location in the Czech Republic
- Coordinates: 49°24′1″N 15°35′26″E
- Country: Czech Republic
- Region: Vysočina
- District: Jihlava
- First mentioned: 1233

Government
  - Mayor: Petr Ryška (ODS)

Area
  - Total: 87.86 km^{2} (33.92 sq mi)
- Elevation: 525 m (1,722 ft)

Population (2026-01-01)
  - Total: 53,686
  - Density: 611.0/km^{2} (1,583/sq mi)
- Time zone: UTC+1 (CET)
  - Summer (DST): UTC+2 (CEST)
- Postal code: 586 01
- Website: www.jihlava.cz

Jihlava (Czech pronunciation: [ˈjɪɦlava]; German: Iglau) is a city in the Czech Republic. It has about 54,000 inhabitants. Situated on the Jihlava River on the historical border between Moravia and Bohemia, Jihlava is the capital of the Vysočina Region.

A royal mining town was established in Jihlava in the early 13th century, making it the oldest mining settlement in the Czech Republic. It was the first city in Central Europe where mining law was codified. By the late 14th century, trade and crafts had become the heart of Jihlava's economy as the importance of mining declined. The city was severely damaged by a fire in 1523 and devastated in the Thirty Years' War but eventually recovered. From the mid-18th century on, Jihlava was a major textile centre in the Austrian Empire and subsequently Austria-Hungary.

The well-preserved historic centre of Jihlava, reconstructed multiple times resulting in an eclectic mix of Gothic, Renaissance and Baroque architecture, is protected as an urban monument reservation. The most valuable monument is the early Gothic Church of Saint James the Great, which is protected as a national cultural monument.

== Administrative division ==
Jihlava consists of 17 municipal parts (in brackets population according to the 2021 census):

- Jihlava (41,265)
- Antonínův Důl (577)
- Červený Kříž (284)
- Helenín (1,036)
- Henčov (180)
- Heroltice (201)
- Horní Kosov (3,795)
- Hosov (177)
- Hruškové Dvory (606)
- Kosov (112)
- Pávov (465)
- Popice (254)
- Pístov (162)
- Sasov (111)
- Staré Hory (1,015)
- Vysoká (72)
- Zborná (211)

== Etymology ==
The origin of the name Jihlava (Iglau in German) is unclear. The most common theory has it derived from the German word Igel, meaning 'hedgehog', usually in reference to the city's coat of arms. However, the name was in use since before the symbol of a hedgehog was. It is more likely the city is named for the river that flows through it, the name of which is also unclear in its origin, either being derived from the German word Igel as the first theory suggests, or from the Slavic word jehla (i.e. 'needle'), referring to sharp stones in the Jihlava river bed.

== Geography ==
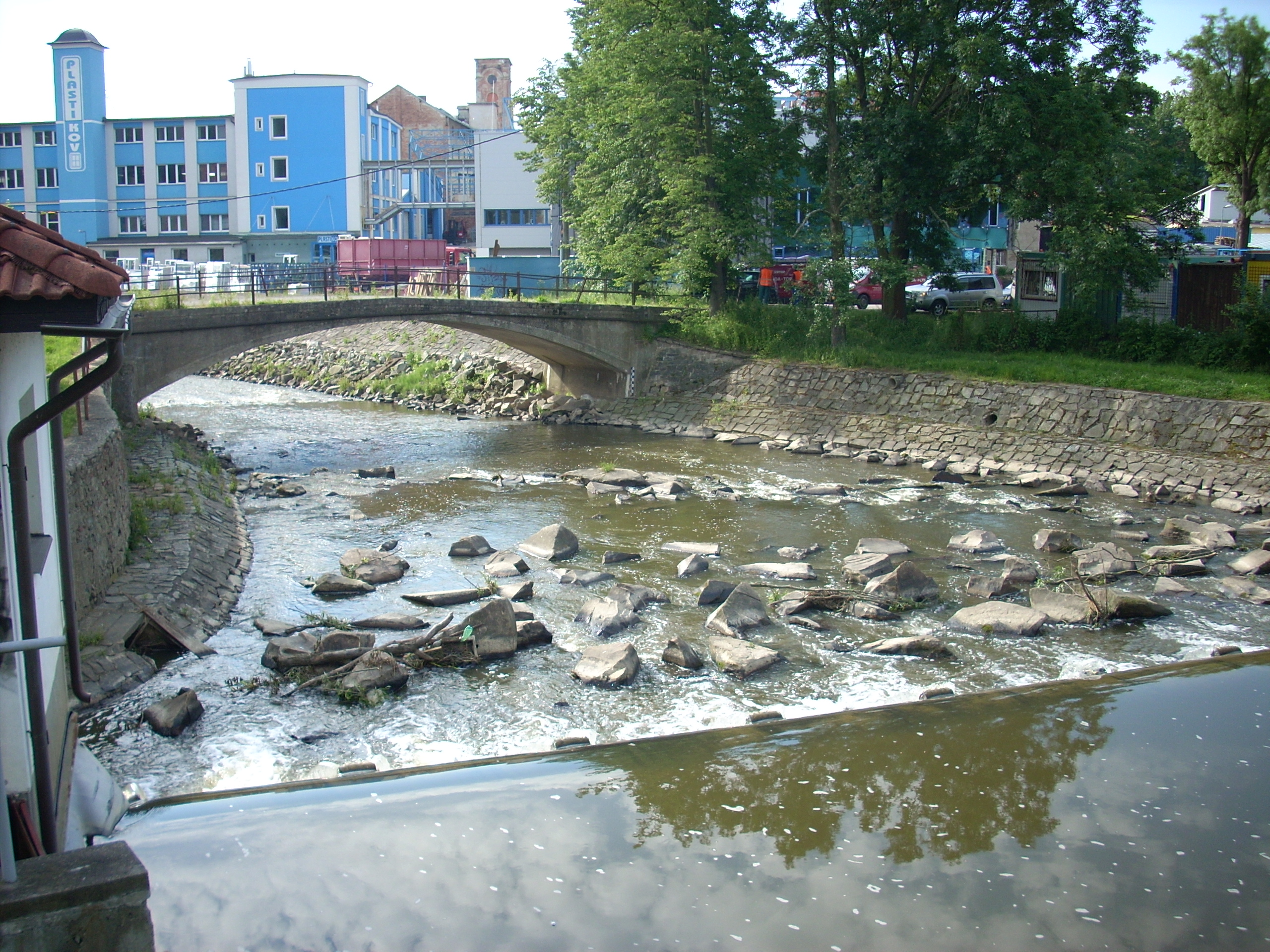
Jihlava River in Jihlava

Jihlava is located about 110 kilometres (68 mi) southeast of Prague and 75 km (47 mi) northwest of Brno. The city is situated on the historical border between Moravia and Bohemia; most of the city lies in Moravia.

Jihlava lies on the Jihlava River, at its confluence with the Jihlávka Stream. The municipal territory is rich in small fishponds.

Jihlava is located in the heart of the Bohemian-Moravian Highlands. The northern part of the territory lies in the Upper Sázava Hills and the southern part lies in the Křižanov Highlands. The highest point is the hill Popický vrch with an elevation of 682 metres (2,238 ft), located on the southern municipal border.

=== Climate ===
Climate data for Jihlava-Hruškové Dvory, 1991–2020 normals, extremes 1961–present
Month	Jan	Feb	Mar	Apr	May	Jun	Jul	Aug	Sep	Oct	Nov	Dec	Year
Record high °C (°F)	13.6 (56.5)	17.4 (63.3)	23.5 (74.3)	28.3 (82.9)	31.9 (89.4)	35.0 (95.0)	35.8 (96.4)	35.2 (95.4)	32.4 (90.3)	27.3 (81.1)	18.7 (65.7)	16.5 (61.7)	35.8 (96.4)
Mean daily maximum °C (°F)	2.2 (36.0)	5.4 (41.7)	9.8 (49.6)	15.6 (60.1)	18.7 (65.7)	23.8 (74.8)	26.0 (78.8)	25.8 (78.4)	20.0 (68.0)	13.5 (56.3)	7.5 (45.5)	3.9 (39.0)	14.4 (57.9)
Daily mean °C (°F)	−1.1 (30.0)	0.7 (33.3)	3.7 (38.7)	8.3 (46.9)	12.3 (54.1)	16.9 (62.4)	18.3 (64.9)	17.9 (64.2)	12.8 (55.0)	8.3 (46.9)	4.3 (39.7)	1.1 (34.0)	8.6 (47.5)
Mean daily minimum °C (°F)	−4.4 (24.1)	−3.0 (26.6)	−1.1 (30.0)	1.8 (35.2)	6.0 (42.8)	10.2 (50.4)	11.3 (52.3)	11.4 (52.5)	7.6 (45.7)	4.2 (39.6)	1.4 (34.5)	−1.6 (29.1)	3.7 (38.7)
Record low °C (°F)	−25.4 (−13.7)	−23.7 (−10.7)	−23.0 (−9.4)	−8.3 (17.1)	−3.9 (25.0)	−0.4 (31.3)	2.7 (36.9)	2.2 (36.0)	−3.2 (26.2)	−7.3 (18.9)	−13.5 (7.7)	−24.5 (−12.1)	−25.4 (−13.7)
Average precipitation mm (inches)	48.9 (1.93)	28.7 (1.13)	30.6 (1.20)	33.6 (1.32)	77.0 (3.03)	80.8 (3.18)	72.6 (2.86)	74.9 (2.95)	59.2 (2.33)	50.8 (2.00)	32.8 (1.29)	36.7 (1.44)	626.6 (24.67)
Average relative humidity (%)	86.6	81.0	76.9	70.7	74.2	73.2	71.7	75.0	82.5	86.6	89.2	88.2	79.7
Source: Czech Hydrometeorological Institute

== History ==
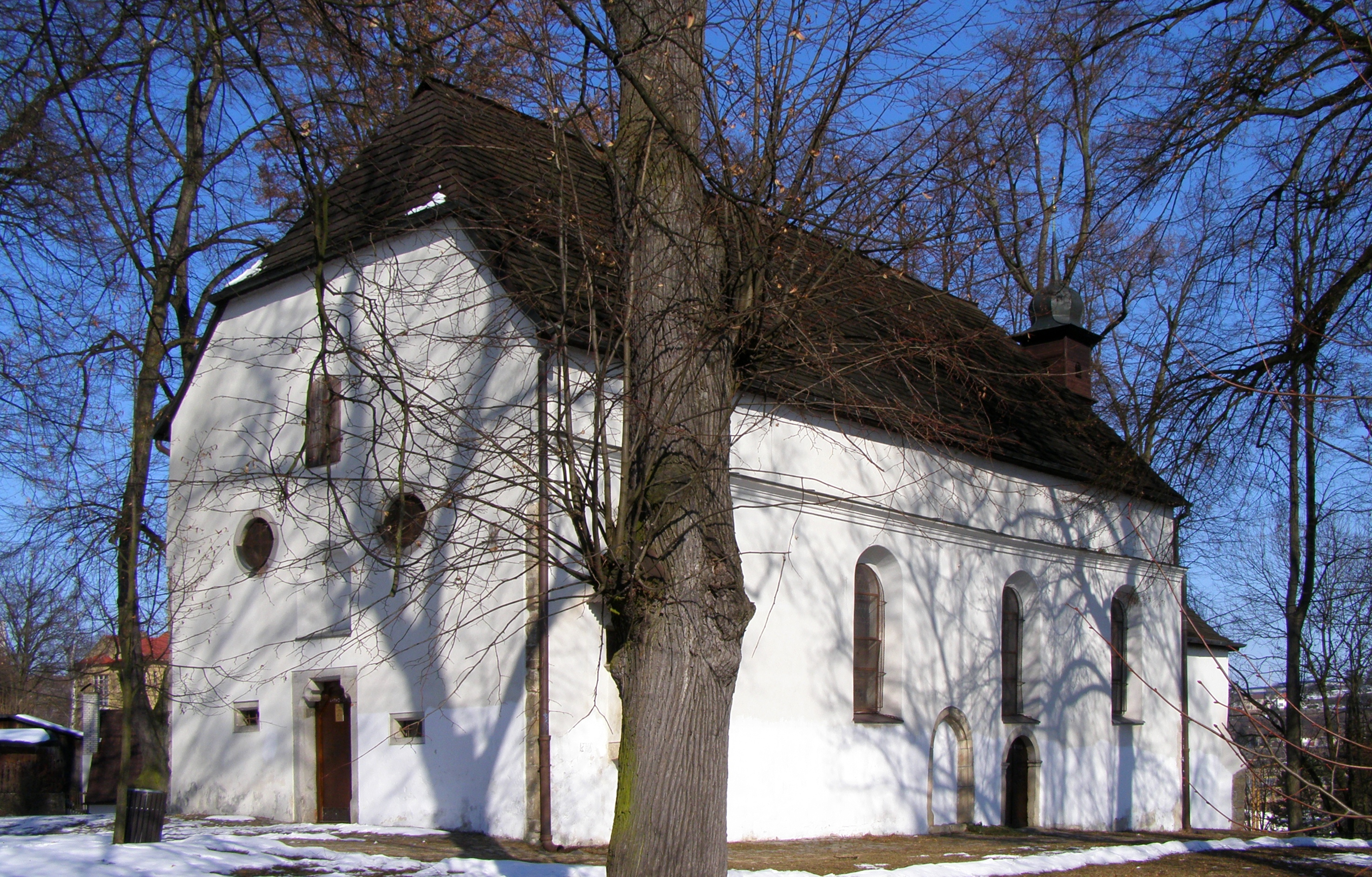
Church of Saint John the Baptist

=== 13th–14th centuries ===
Jihlava was originally a Slavic market village with a small Church of Saint John the Baptist, established on a trade route around 1200. The first written mention of Jihlava is from 1233. The mining of silver began here in 1234 and the royal mining town was established between 1233 and 1240. Jihlava thus became the oldest mining town in what is today the Czech Republic.

The village was originally located on the left bank of the river Jihlava, but with the expansion of mining and the influx of inhabitants, the town spread to the right bank, where its historic centre was established. The regular plan of the rectangular network of streets with a large square in the middle was given by the building regulations of King Ottokar II from 1270. Royal privileges guaranteed prosperity and Jihlava soon became one of the most powerful cities in the kingdom. It was protected by a massive fortification and coins were minted here. It became the first city in Central Europe where mining law was codified.

Mining attracted settlers from Bavaria, Saxony and other German-speaking regions to the city. Gradually a large German-speaking community was established here.

=== 15th–19th centuries ===
Map of Jihlava (c. 1750)

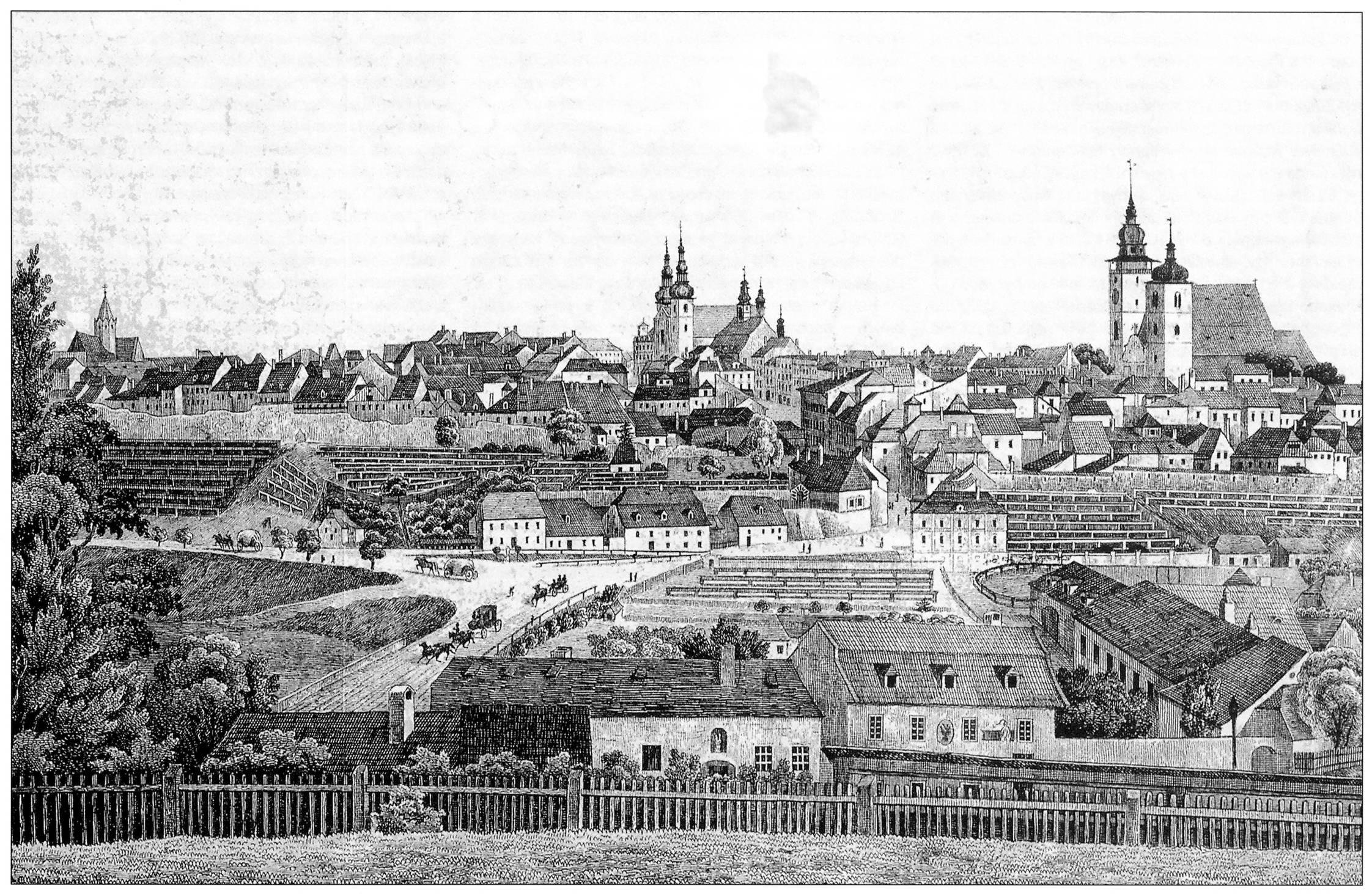
View of Jihlava from the south in 1849

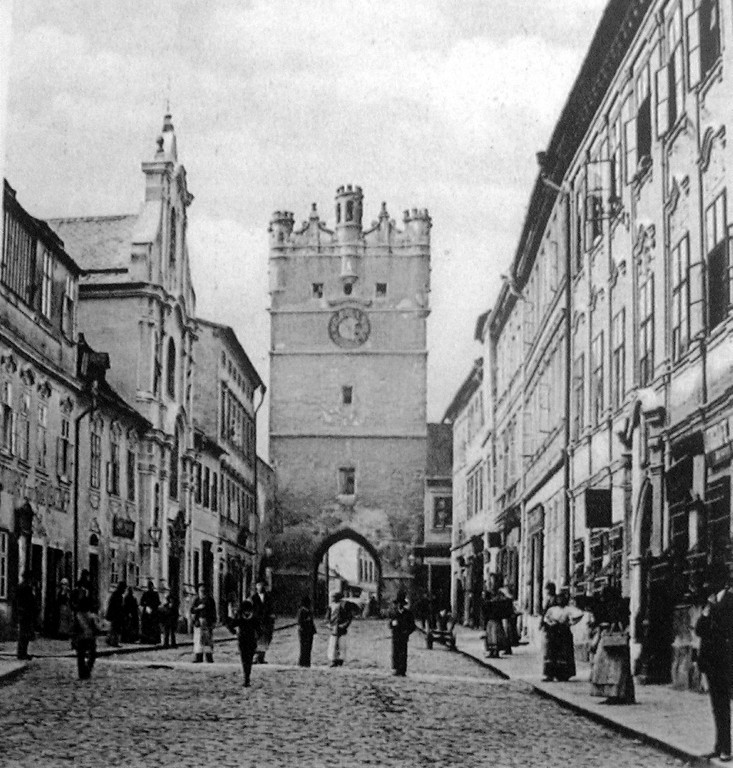
Gate of Holy Mother, 1899

At the end of the 14th century, the importance of mining declined when the richest deposits were mined, and Jihlava instead became a centre of trade and crafts, especially cloth making.

In the era of the Hussite Wars, Jihlava remained a Catholic stronghold and managed to resist a number of sieges. On 5 July 1436, a treaty was made with the Hussites here, whereby the Emperor Sigismund was acknowledged king of Bohemia. A marble relief near the city marks the spot where Ferdinand I, in 1527, swore fidelity to the Bohemian estates.

In 1523, a large fire severely damaged the city, which was subsequently restored in the Renaissance style. During the Thirty Years' War, Jihlava was twice captured by the Swedish troops. The suburbs were burned, most of the houses were demolished, and the city significantly depopulated. Jihlava recovered only after more than 100 years. The city was restored in the Baroque style and began to develop again.

In 1742, it fell into the hands of the Prussians, and in December 1805 the Bavarians under Karl Philipp von Wrede were defeated near the city.

In the second half of the 18th century, Jihlava was the second largest producer of cloth in the Austrian Empire. At that time the city expanded beyond the city walls. The city gates with narrow passages were demolished at the beginning of the 19th century, and the façades of the houses were remodeled in the Neoclassical style.

=== 20th century ===
From an ethnic point of view, the city was half-German (about 54% in 1921) and half-Czech, but mostly German was spoken here. The city and its surroundings constituted a German-speaking enclave within Czech-speaking Bohemia and Moravia, the so-called Jihlava language island. After World War I and the establishment of Czechoslovakia, the Germans demanded the annexation of the German language island to Austria. But the Austrian parliament itself rejected their request, so they had to adapt. In the 1920 election, German parties won a majority.

The relatively peaceful coexistence of the Czech and German-speaking inhabitants that lasted for hundreds of years ended with the nationalism caused by the Sudeten German Party of Konrad Henlein, which raised in 1933.

The Jewish synagogue, built in 1862–1863, was burnt down in 1939. Most of Jihlava's Jewish population, which numbered over 1,000 people, was deported and killed due to the Holocaust in Bohemia and Moravia. After the end of World War II, starting from 9 May 1945, German-speakers were banned from using public transportation and were ordered to carry white armbands identifying them as Germans. Following the Beneš decrees, most of the German-speakers were expelled.

Between 1950 and 1952, Jihlava was the site of several show trials of Communist Party of Czechoslovakia, which were directed against the influence of the Catholic Church on the rural population. In the processes eleven death sentences were passed. All the convicted persons were rehabilitated after the Velvet Revolution.

In 1969, in protest against the normalization in Czechoslovakia, Evžen Plocek set himself on fire on the city square in emulation of others in Prague. Today there is a memorial plaque to him.

On 6 June 1991, after the collapse of centrally-planned socialist economy, the first ever supermarket in now-capitalist Czechoslovakia opened in Jihlava.

== Demographics ==
Historical population

Year	Pop.	±%
1869	24,197	—
1880	26,750	+10.6%
1890	28,577	+6.8%
1900	30,213	+5.7%
1910	32,724	+8.3%

Year	Pop.	±%
1921	32,702	−0.1%
1930	37,076	+13.4%
1950	31,268	−15.7%
1961	36,528	+16.8%
1970	42,538	+16.5%

Year	Pop.	±%
1980	49,770	+17.0%
1991	51,831	+4.1%
2001	50,702	−2.2%
2011	50,075	−1.2%
2021	50,523	+0.9%

Source: Censuses

== Economy ==
The industry in Jihlava is mainly focused on the production of machines and components for the automotive industry. The largest company based in the city is Bosch Diesel, a subsidiary of Robert Bosch GmbH. The company employs about 4,000 people and is among the largest employers in the region. It manufactures components for diesel injection pump.

Other important industrial companies include Marelli Automotive Lighting Jihlava (a producer of automotive lighting) and Motorpal, a manufacturer of injection pumps founded in 1946.

The most important non-industrial employers include the Jihlava Hospital and the Jihlava Psychiatric Hospital.

The Jihlava agglomeration was defined as a tool for drawing money from the European Structural and Investment Funds. It is an area that includes the city and its surroundings, linked to the city by commuting and migration. It has about 98,000 inhabitants.

== Transport ==
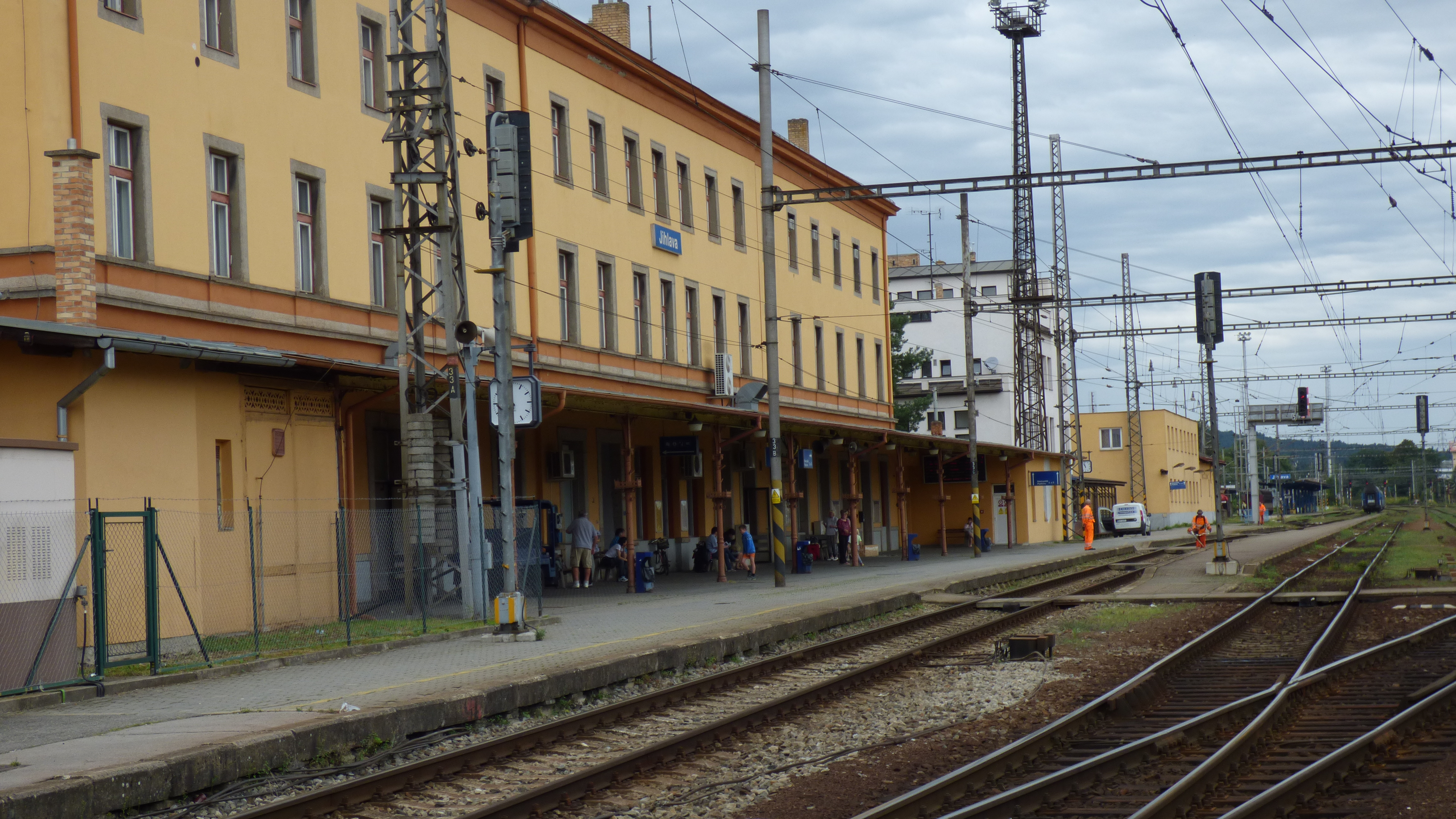
Main train station

The D1 motorway (part of the European routes E50 and E65) runs through the northern part of the territory of Jihlava and thus the city has excellent road connection with other regions of the Czech Republic. The I/38 road (the section from Znojmo to Havlíčkův Brod, part of the European route E59) runs through the city proper.

Jihlava is the terminus and starting point of the railway lines from/to Brno, Třebíč and Tábor. It also lies on the line Havlíčkův Brod–Slavonice. The territory of Jihlava is served by four train stations: Jihlava, Jihlava město, Jihlava-Staré Hory and Jihlava-Bosch Diesel.

Intra-city transport is provided by the company Dopravní podnik města Jihlavy a.s., which is owned by the city of Jihlava. In addition to buses, trolleybuses also provide intra-city transport. Trolleybus service was started in 1948. There are 6 trolleybus lines in operation with a total length of 38.9 km (24.2 mi).

== Education ==
In 2004, the College of Polytechnics Jihlava was founded. In 2024, it had more than 2,100 students.

== Culture ==
Since 1997, the Jihlava International Documentary Film Festival has been held in Jihlava every year.

== Sport ==
The city's football club is FC Vysočina Jihlava. The club plays mostly in the Czech National Football League (second tier).

The local ice hockey club, HC Dukla Jihlava, was successful between 1966 and 1991, however in recent decades it plays mostly in the 1st Czech Republic Hockey League (second tier).

== Sights ==
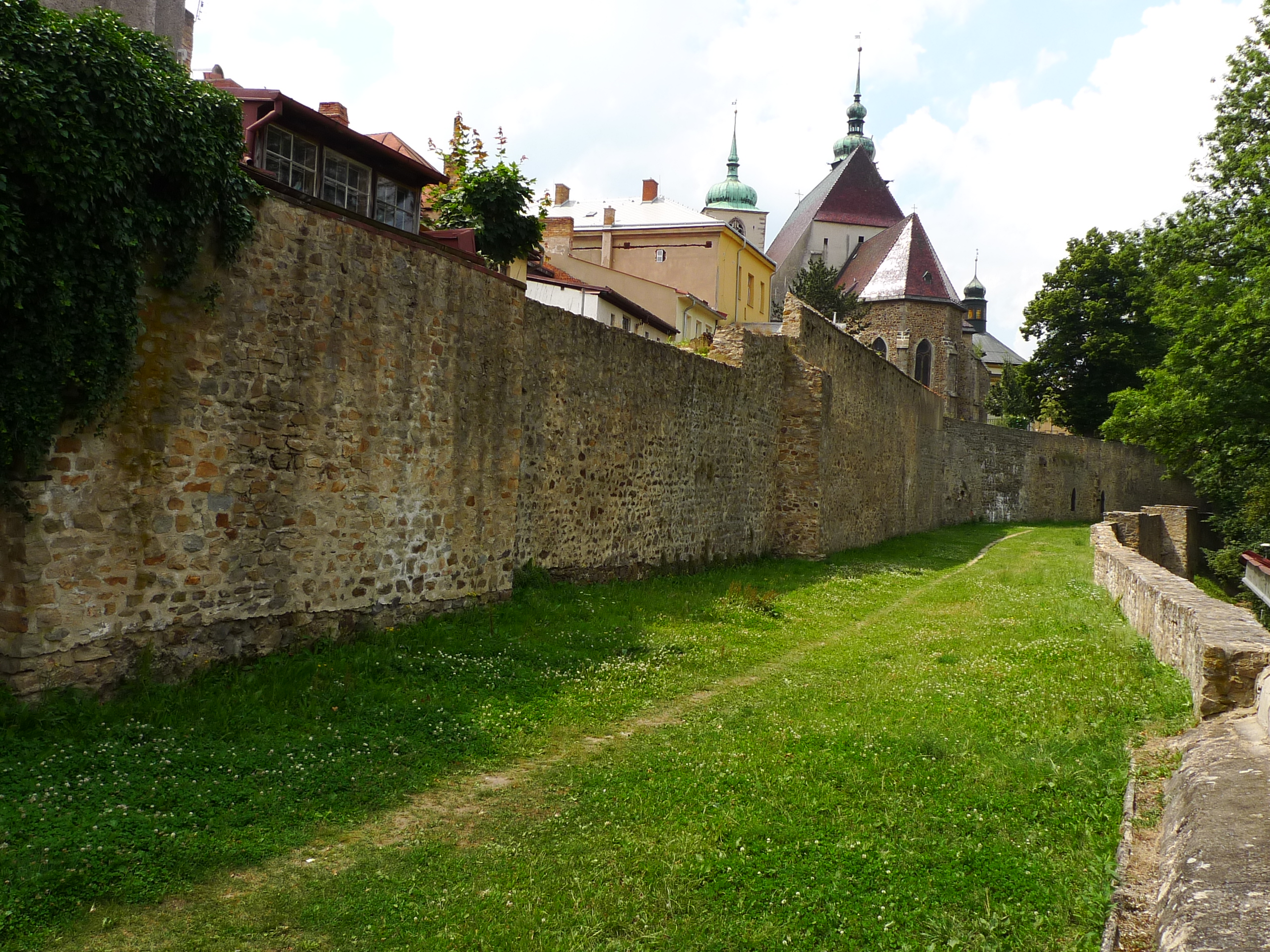
Remains of the city fortifications

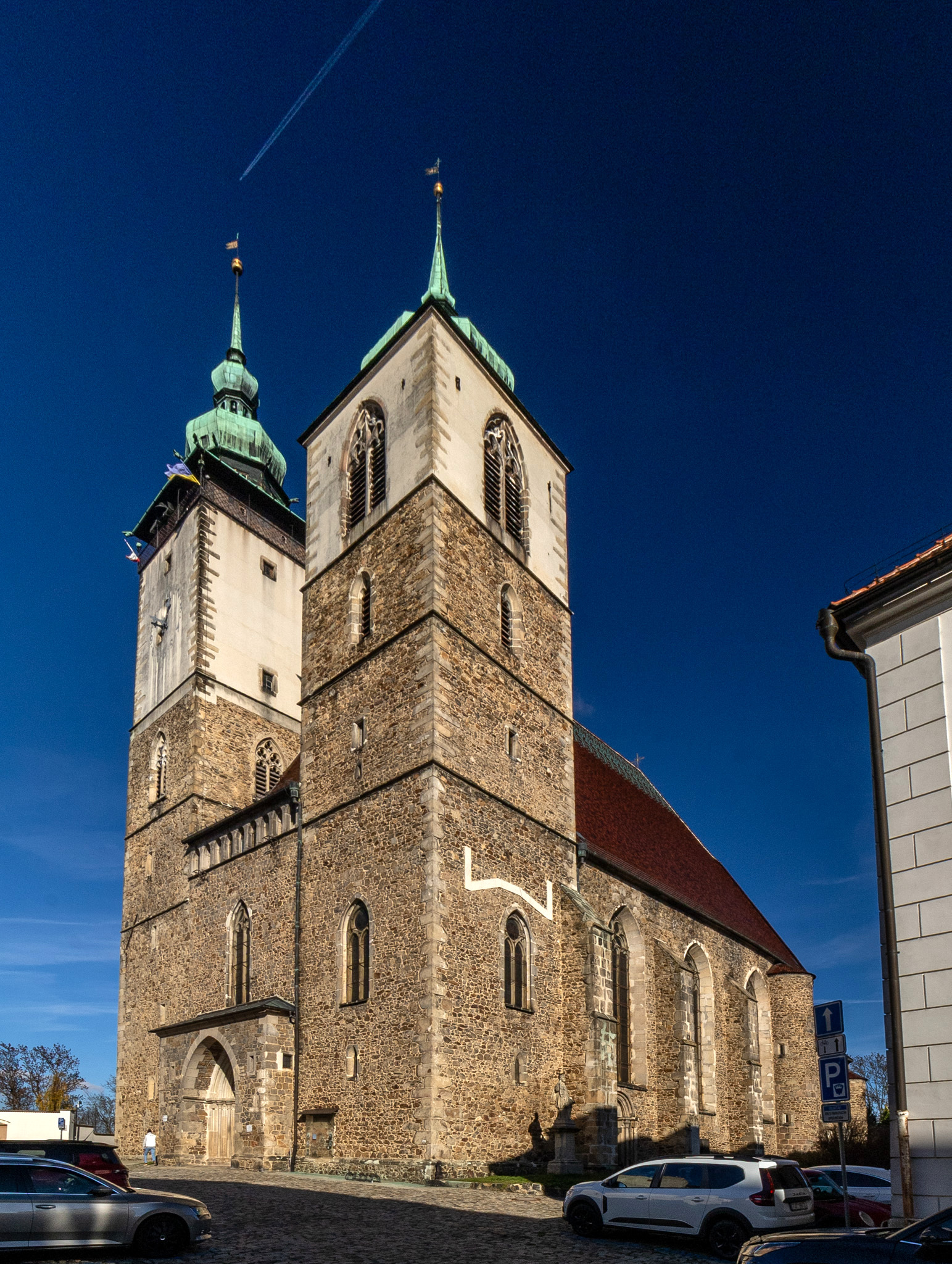
Church of Saint James the Great

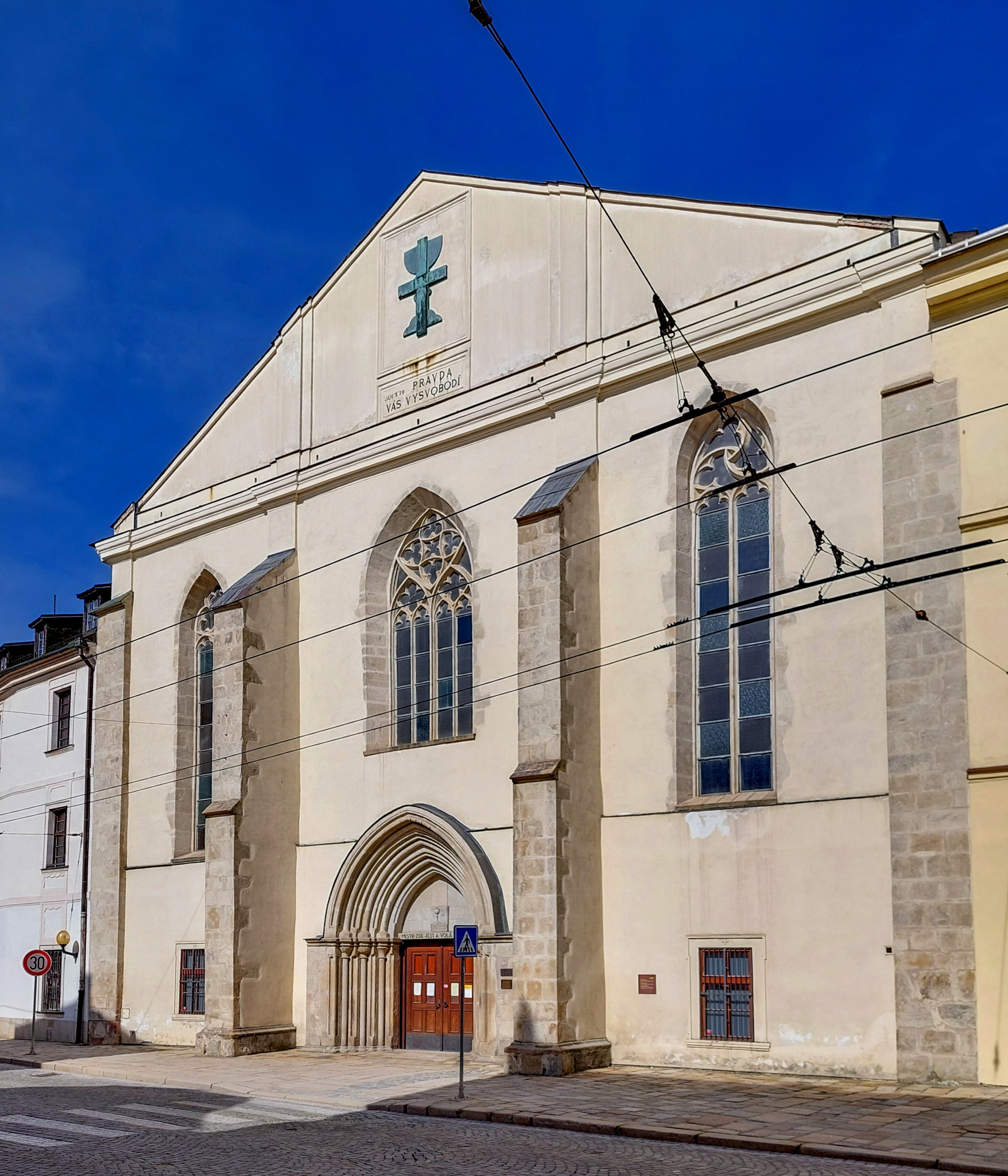
Church of the Exaltation of the Holy Cross

Thanks to its building development, Gothic, Renaissance and Baroque buildings are located next to each other in Jihlava. The historic centre is formed by the square Masarykovo náměstí and its surroundings. In the past it was delimited by walls, some of which have been preserved to this day. The zwinger was modified into a park. The only surviving gate of the five is the Gate of the Holy Mother.

Masarykovo náměstí is the third largest city square in the country with an area of 36,653 square metres (394,530 sq ft). In the middle of the square is a plague column from 1690 and two fountains from 1797.

The main landmarks of the square are the city hall and Church of Saint Ignatius of Loyola. The city hall with a Gothic core has served its purpose since 1425. It was rebuilt and extended several times. In the mid-16th century, a turret with clock was added, a Gothic hall was established and the façade was decorated by a large Renaissance fresco. In 1786, the second floor was added, the fresco was overlaid by new façade, and the large Gothic hall was split in half by the wall.

Jihlava Zoo was founded in 1982. It breeds about 260 species of animals.

=== Ecclesiastical monuments ===
The early Gothic Church of Saint James the Great from the 13th century is one of the symbols of Jihlava. The Chapel of Our Lady of Sorrows was added to the church in 1702. In 1725, the church became a parish church. It has two towers, 63 metres (207 ft) and 54 metres (177 ft) high. The higher tower is open to the public as a lookout tower. The bell in the belltower, called Zuzana, is the second largest bell in Moravia. For its value, the church is protected as a national cultural monument.

The oldest church is the Church of Saint John the Baptist. It was founded around 1200 together with the original village on the left bank of the Jihlava River. It was rebuilt several times, its current appearance is a result of Baroque reconstruction from the late 18th century.

The Friars Minor Church of the Ascension of the Virgin Mary was built after 1250. Today the originally Gothic church has a Baroque appearance. Since 1784, it has been a parish church.

The Church of Saint Ignatius of Loyola on the city square was built in the early Baroque style in 1683–1689 for the Jesuits. Next to the church is a former Jesuit dormitory built in 1699–1711.

The Dominican Church of the Exaltation of the Holy Cross was founded in 1247. The Church of the Holy Spirit was built in the Renaissance style in 1547 and rebuilt in the Mannerist style in 1661. The Evangelical Church of Saint Paul is a neo-Gothic building, built in 1875–1878.

The only preserved Jewish monument is the Jewish cemetery. It was founded in 1869 and contains over 1,000 tombstones, including the tombstones of the parents of Gustav Mahler.

== Notable people ==
- Gustav Mahler (1860–1911), Austrian composer and conductor; lived here in 1860–1875
- Julius Tandler (1869–1936), physician and politician
- Hans Krebs (1888–1947), Nazi SS officer executed for treason
- Emilie Tolnay (1901–1944), Austrian hairdresser and executed resistance member
- František Cipro (1947–2023), football manager
- Zdeněk Měřínský (1948–2016), archeologist and historian
- Ondřej Vetchý (born 1962), actor
- Patrik Augusta (born 1969), ice hockey player
- Bobby Holík (born 1971), ice hockey player
- Jiří Šlégr (born 1971), ice hockey player
- Martin Prokop (born 1982), rally driver
- Lukáš Krpálek (born 1990), judoka
- David Rittich (born 1992), ice hockey player

== Twin towns – sister cities ==
Jihlava is twinned with:

- Heidenheim an der Brenz, Germany
- Uzhhorod, Ukraine
- Zgierz, Poland
