= Church of St. James the Great (Jihlava) =

Church of Saint James the Great
- Kostel Svatého Jakuba Staršího
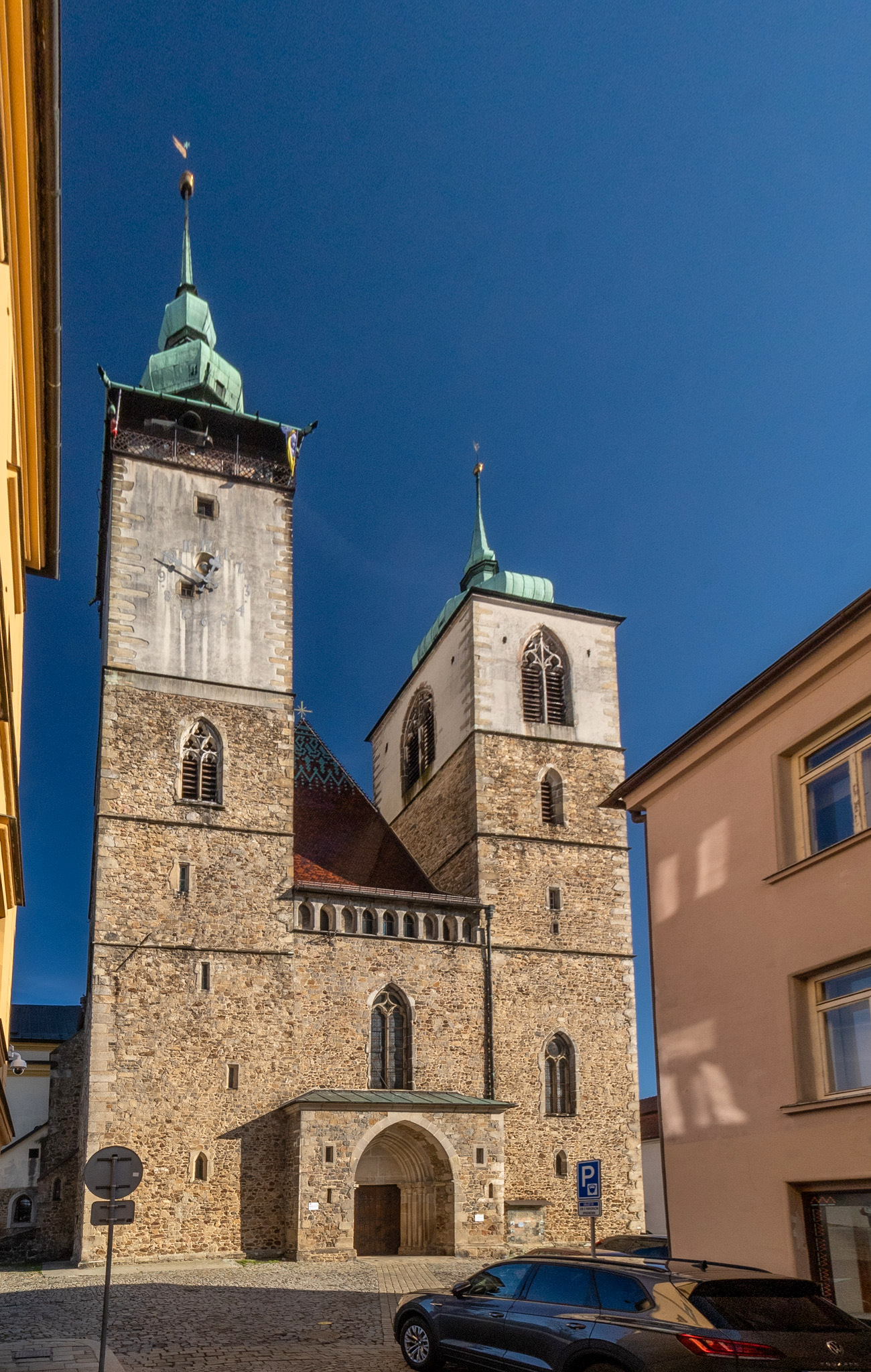
- Exterior of the church
- Church of Saint James the Great
- 49.395278°N 15.593611°E
- Location: Jihlava
- Country: Czech Republic
- Denomination: Roman Catholic Church
- Website: Church website

History
- Status: Active
- Founded: 1256
- Dedication: Saint James the Great
- Consecrated: 1257

Architecture
- Functional status: Parish church
- Style: Gothic
- Completed: 15th century

Sound of the church bell Zuzana in 1939

The Church of St. James the Great (Czech: Kostel svatého Jakuba Staršího) is an early Gothic church in Jihlava in the Czech Republic. It is a three-aisled temple nave with a long presbytery and two high towers in the front. It is consecrated to the patron of miners Saint James the Great.

== History ==
The Church of Saint James the Great was first mentioned in documents, which are dated to 1256, when the previous church, which stood in its place, was burned down. In the same year the construction of the new church began. In 1257 the presbytery was completed, since the main altar of Saint Nicholas was consecrated in the same year. The consecration was carried out by the bishop Bruno von Schauenburg, who also promoted the church to parish. The first priest in the newly ordained church was Stephen, one of the prominent figures in the history of medieval Jihlava. The construction of the church continued in the next decade.

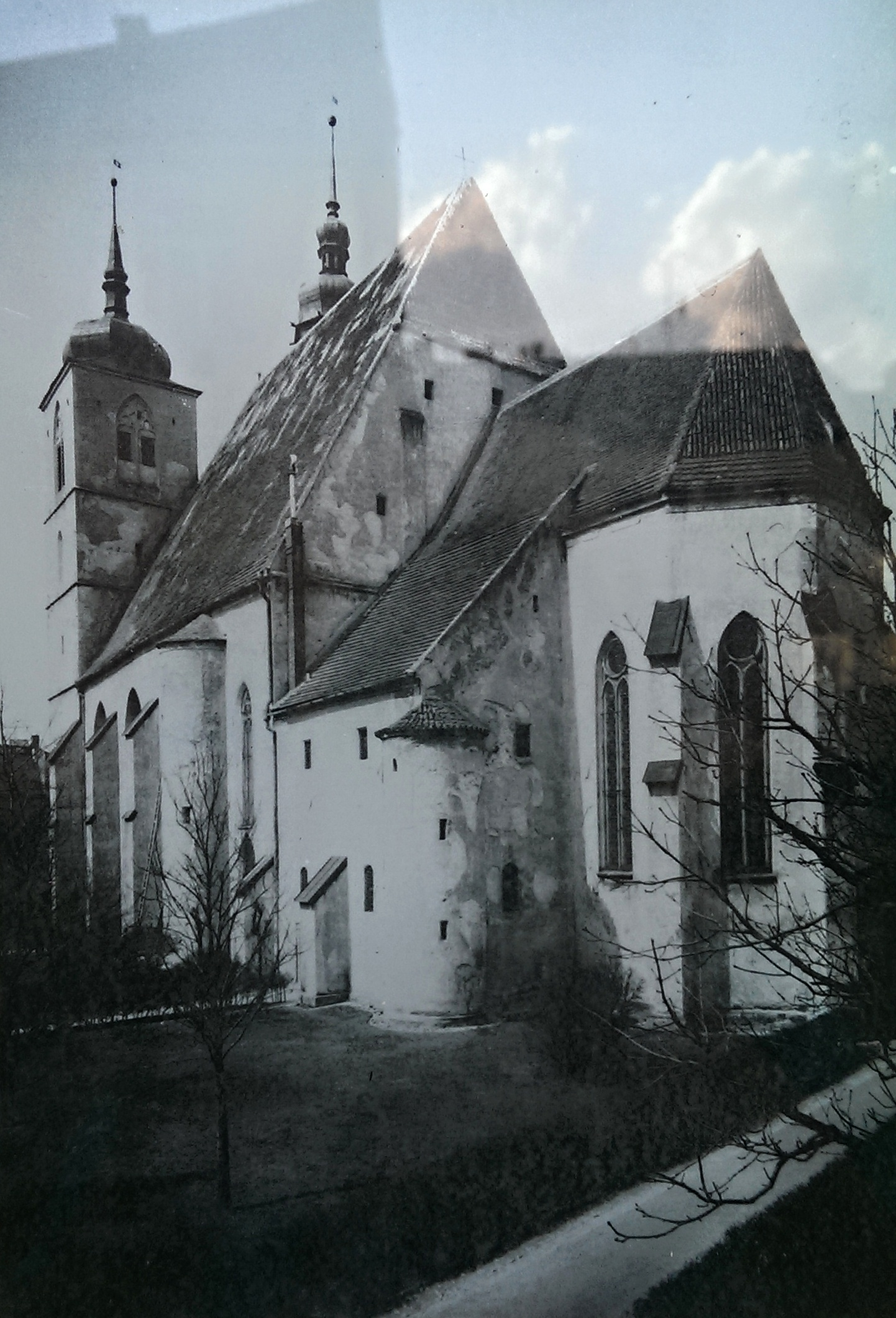
Historical photography

The completing of the northern (higher) tower of the church is documented at the end of the 13th century. With its height of 63m, its function was also as a watchtower at that time. This tower is used as a lookout tower nowadays. The whole city suffered a great fire in 1353 and this fire apparently damaged the parish church too. The large repairs of the church are dated back to 1373–1379. At that time, a three-aisled nave was completed and topped with a cross-ribbed vault. A spiral staircase on the south side and a floor above the sacristy were built at that same time as well. The southern tower, which had the function of a belfry, was built in the 1430s.

An important point in the history of the church was the year 1436, when the Mass was served to the occasion of the proclamation of the Compacts of Basel, during the presence of the Holy Roman Emperor Sigismund.

Jihlava was struck by another big fire in 1523, the Church of St. James the Great, including both towers, was heavily damaged too. Subsequent repairs lasted over 40 years.

The southern tower began to lean dangerously and to deflect from its axis in 1548. It was necessary to reduce its height to today's 54 meters. A new big bell was hanged and consecrated in 1563 and it was called Zuzana. It is the second largest bell in Moravia until nowadays.

The church went through the Baroque style changes in 1702, the chapel of The Mother of Sorrows was added to the northern side of the church, and it was separated from the main nave by the decorated Baroque grid.

A general reconstruction of the church was made in a Purist spirit at the end of the 19th century, during which the roof got new covers. Several static supports of the northern tower were carried out by August Wolfholz company in 1922. The interior was modified in 1987, by removing the inappropriate Art Nouveau decoration.

The Church of St. James the Great was declared a national cultural monument on 1 July 2008.

== Architecture ==
=== The interior ===
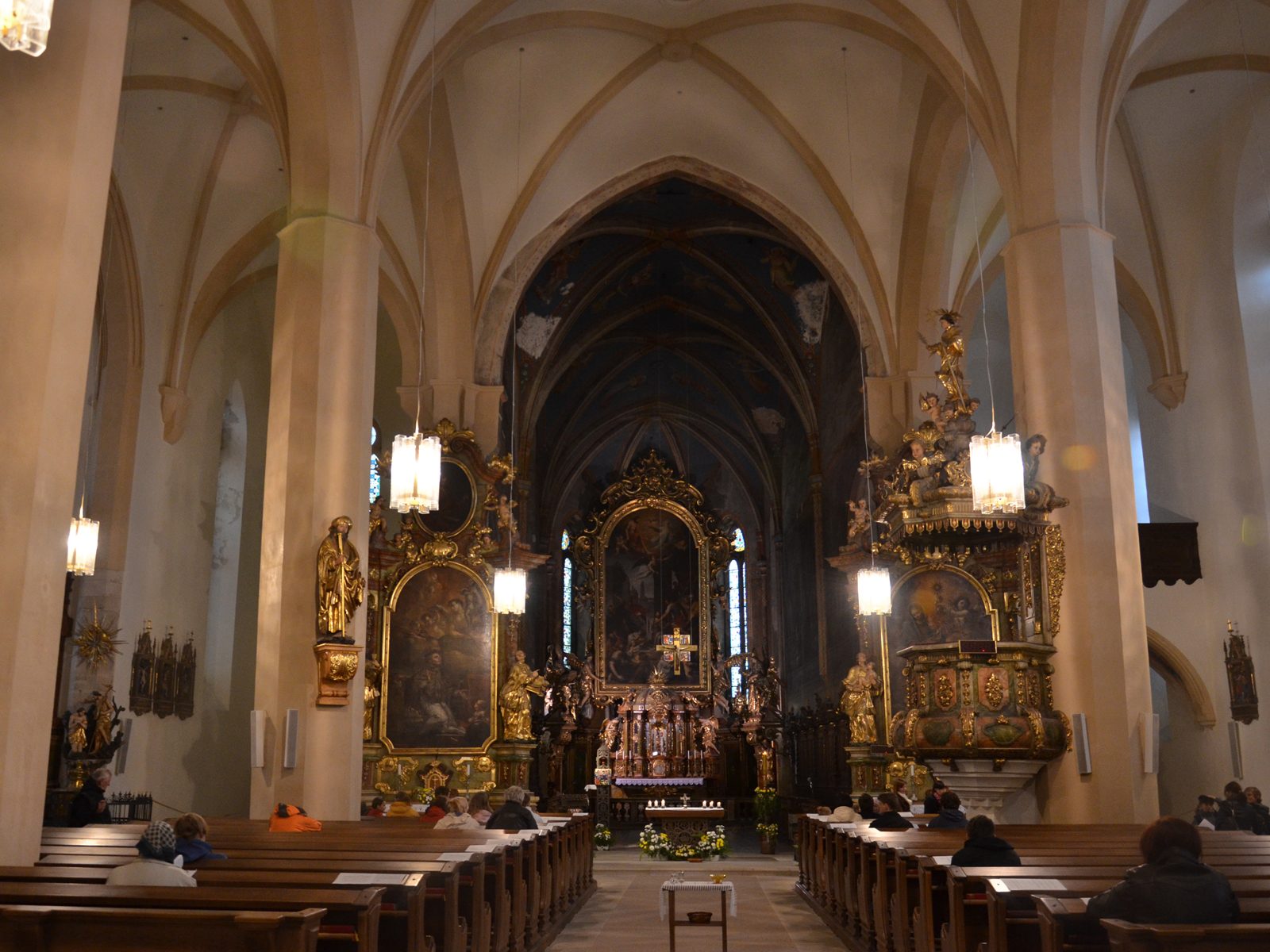
The interior of the church

The interior of the church is built as three-aisles, the main nave is followed by a chancel, which has a polygonal pentagonal closing. The side aisles end in short rectangular closings. The three aisles of the temple and the presbytery are topped by cross ribbed vaults. The closing of the chancel has a radial vault. The ribs are carved in a decorative shape, with slightly bevelled edges, and joined in the flat circular keystones at the apex of the vault.

Ribs in the chancel continue to the heads, which are closing simple or bundle round shafts. The vault above the three aisles is supported by four massive polygonal pillars and ribs ends in pyramidal brackets on the walls. The chancel is opened to the nave by a massive triumphal arc. There is a huge choir with organs above the entrance hall of the church. The entrance hall is also topped with a cross ribbed vault.

=== Decoration of the interior ===
The temple's chancel is covered with a large number of frescoes and medieval paintings. The vault is covered in paintings with Neo-Gothic ornaments, the walls are painted with scenes from the life of St. Bernard.

The church is equipped with several Baroque gilded altars. The monument of the church is a 7.5m high painting of "Decapitation of St. James", which decorates the main altar. Its author, one of the painters of Empress Maria Theresa, J. N. Steiner, was born in Jihlava. In church are kept sculpture treasures - a unique pieta from 1330, the statue of St. Catherine of Alexandria from the beginning of the 15th century and the late Gothic statue of St. James from the 16th century. An interesting artefact is the modern replica of the Přemyslid cross. The original is dated to 1330 and is now located in the picture gallery of the Strahov Monastery. The replica is there to remind, that the original was hung in the church of Jihlava.

=== The exterior ===
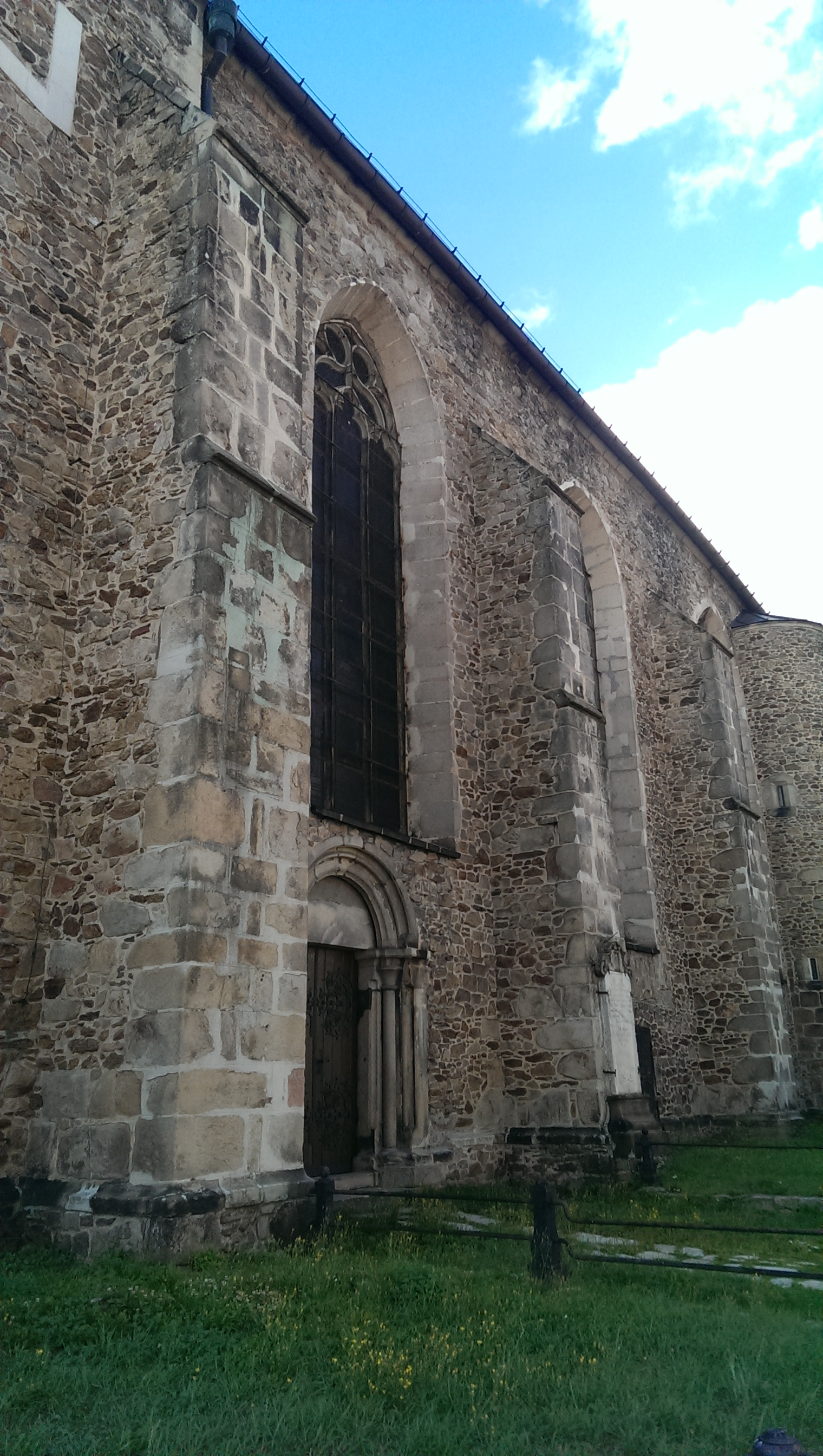
Supporting buttresses

The church is currently without any external plaster; walls consist mainly of quarried stone from local quarries. The buttresses are made from larger blocks of the local stone, bricks are used in some newer parts of the building. Only the highest floor of the tower and the Mother of Sorrows chapel are plastered at the current time.

The walls of the church are mostly supported by one stepped buttresses on the outside. The walls of the chapel and the aisles are decorated with tall, slender lancet arch windows, which are divided by vertical rods. Windows are decorated with tracery, mostly filled with complicated curved shapes with a flame motive.

The main entrance to the church is through a portal, which is from the early gothic period. There are slender columns with crowded plate pedestals in the corners, topped with shaped capitals. Tympanum is smooth, lined with multiple archivolts. Few smaller portals are similarly conceived, preserved also in the northern and southern walls of the church. The northern portal columns are decorated with folk decor and perhaps with grapes, compared to the other portals.

The walls of the church are unconventionally decorated with gravestones from the cemetery, which originally surrounded the church. On the eastern side there is a Baroque statue of John of Nepomuk.

=== The towers ===
The towers of the parish church belong between the most visible buildings monuments in Jihlava. Today's shape of towers is the result of many reconstructions and adaptations over the centuries. The north tower now measures 63 meters and serves as a lookout tower. The gallery is located 40 m above the ground and offers a wide view of the surroundings. The original tower had a pyramidal roof and a mural painting in the front. After many fires, the two towers were rebuilt and finished with baroque onion dome. The southern tower was reduced to today's height of 54 meters.

=== Chapel of Our Lady of Sorrows ===
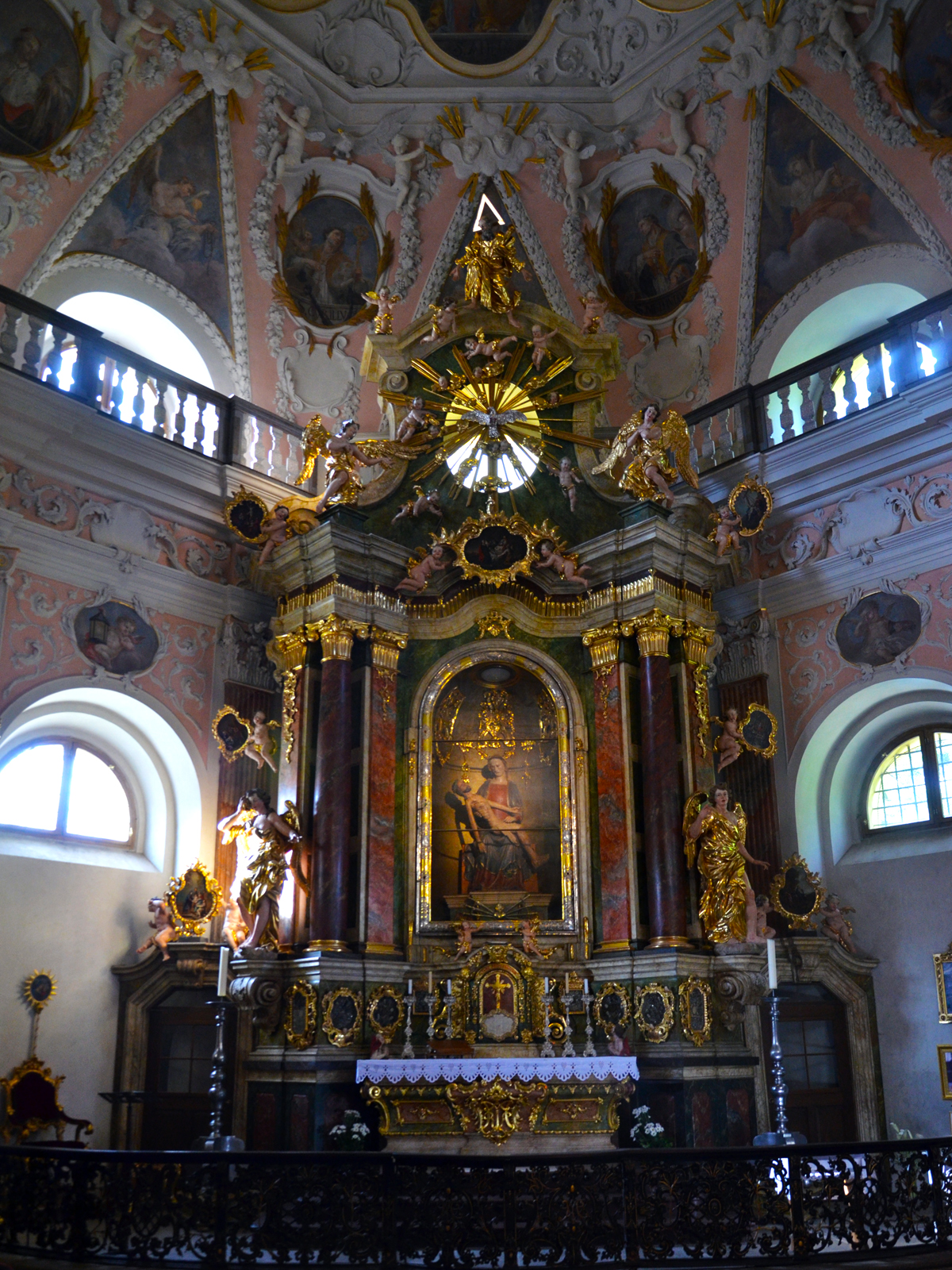
The Mother of Sorrows chapel, interior

In 1702 the Chapel of Our Lady of Sorrows was built at the northern side of the church, separated from the interior of the church by a richly decorated baroque grid.

The ceiling is in a form of wedge-shaped rib vaulted. The chapel has two portals with and semi-circular windows.

It is decorated with lunettes and a polygonal lantern hanging in the middle. The walls are divided by pilasters, which supports the continuous entablature. The chapel has a rich stucco decoration. Its author is Giacomo Antonio Corbellini. The decorations of the chapel are by Václav Jindřich Nosecký. The entrance to the Baroque Mother of Sorrows chapel is through a richly decorated portal.

In the Mother of Sorrows chapel there is an altar from the first half of 19th century. There is a Pieta in the centre of the altar, from the second half of the 14th century. It is richly decorated with statues of saints.

== Interesting facts ==
=== The legend of the bell Zuzana ===
The burghers of Jihlava wanted to show off their wealth to the surrounding citizens so they invited a famous bellmaker Brikci of Cinperk to create a bell that would become famous across the whole land for them. They promised him a good amount of money if his work was successful. The great bell was created in the fortification moat near the Virgin Gate on the day of St. Michael in 1563. When the metal was melted in the big boiler, many people from Jihlava came and threw gold chains, rings, jewels, and hardly earned and speared coins into the boiling melt. All of the gold slowly disappeared in the forge. The biggest amount of coins was donated by a woman named Zuzana. The coins were from 1840 and golden coins, she donated them to redeem herself. As soon as the bell, baptized by the name of James, was hung on the tower in 1563, Zuzana sat on a chair between the temple doors and let it ring. And since then everybody has referred to the bell as Zuzana, although its name is James.

== Gallery ==
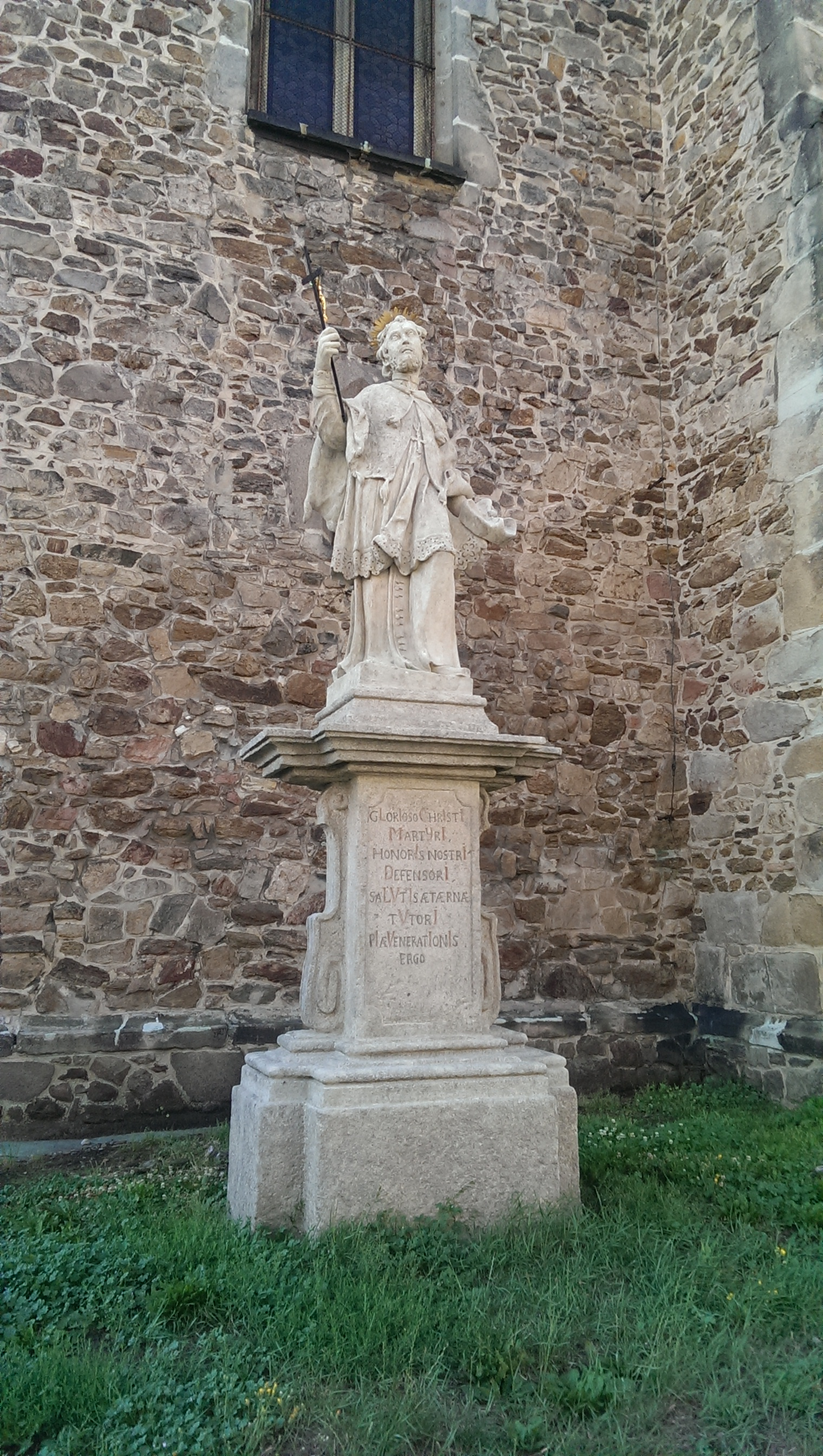
Saint John of Nepomuk statue

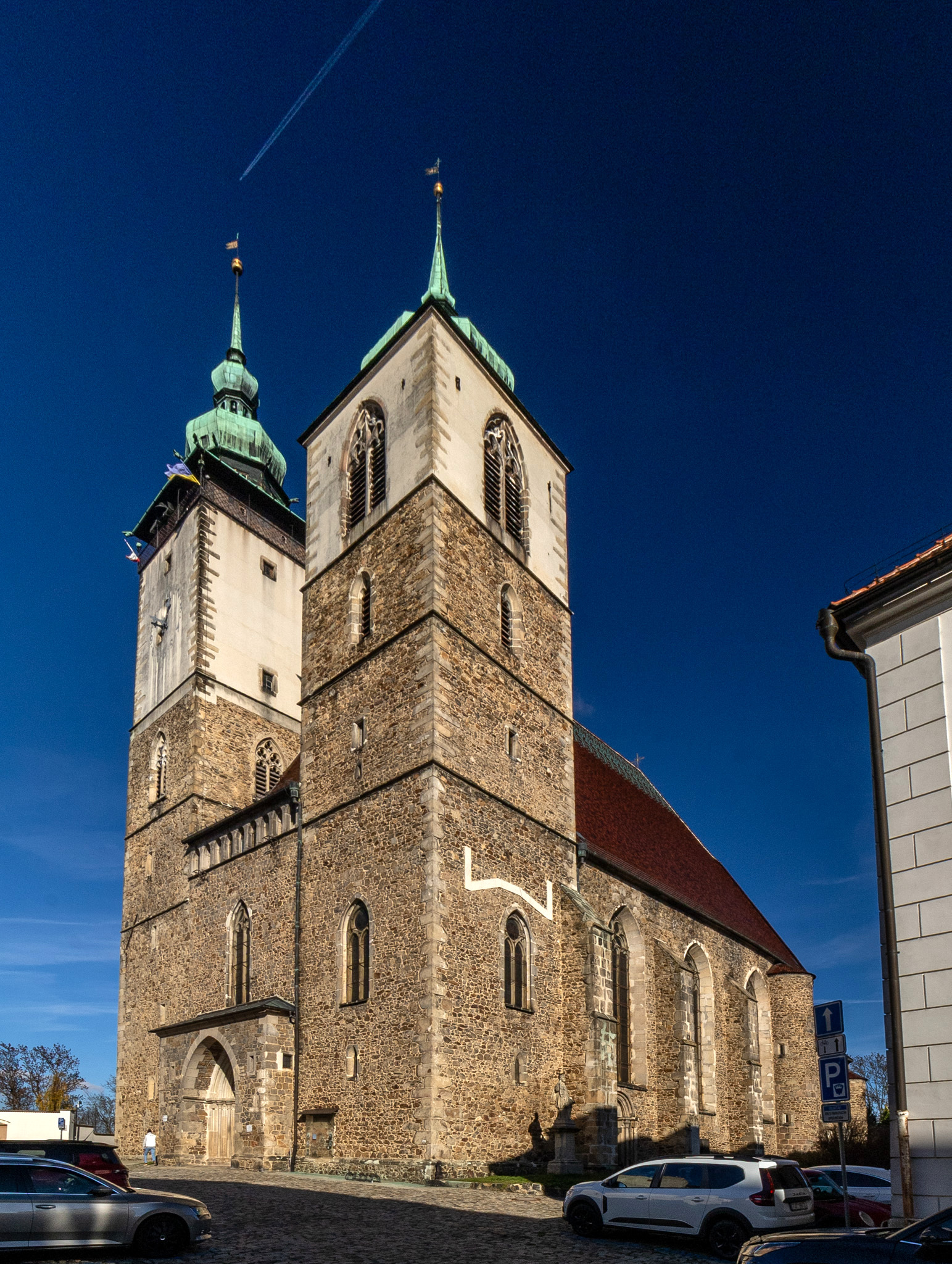
Exterior from the front

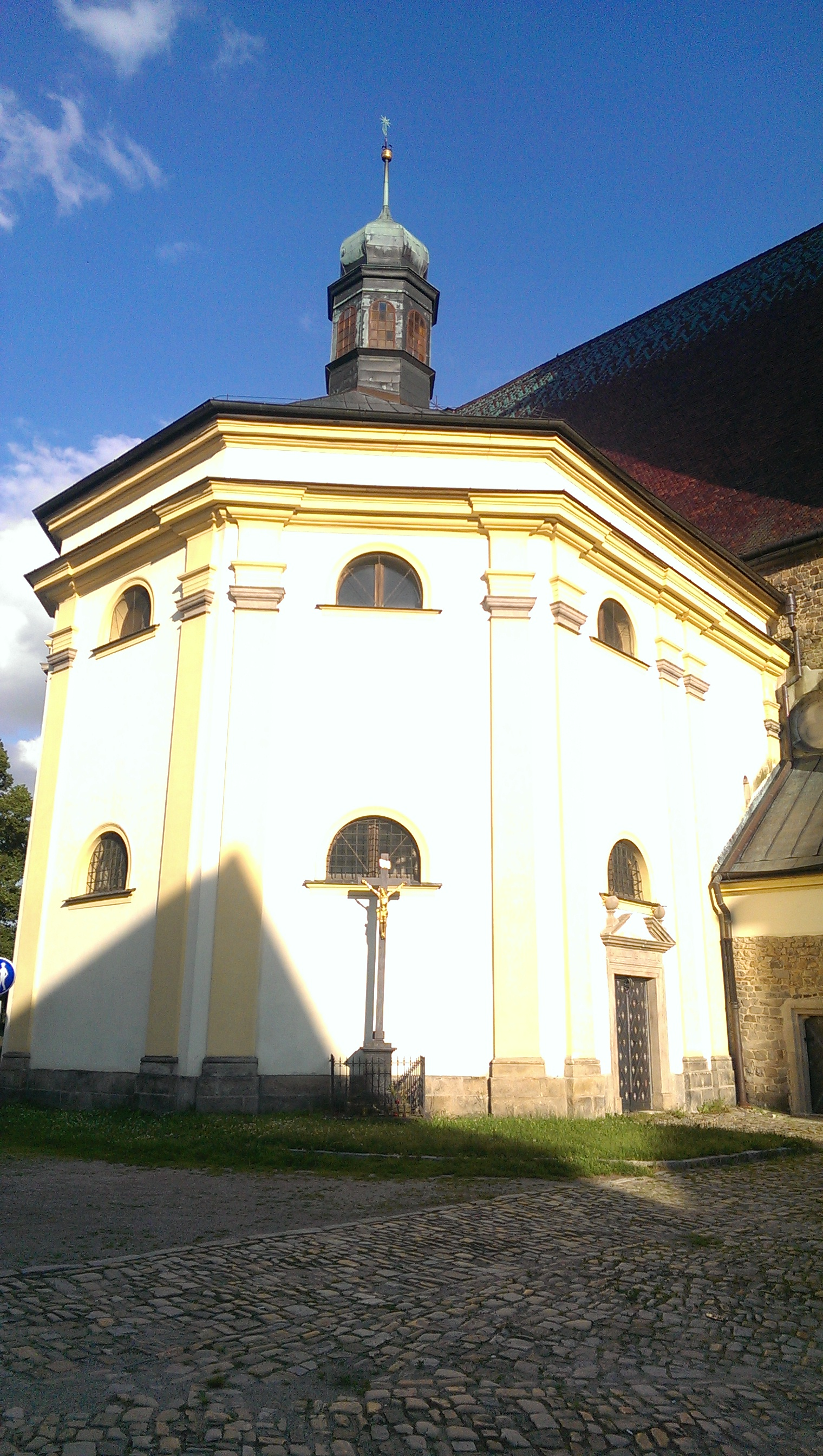
Mother of Sorrows chapel

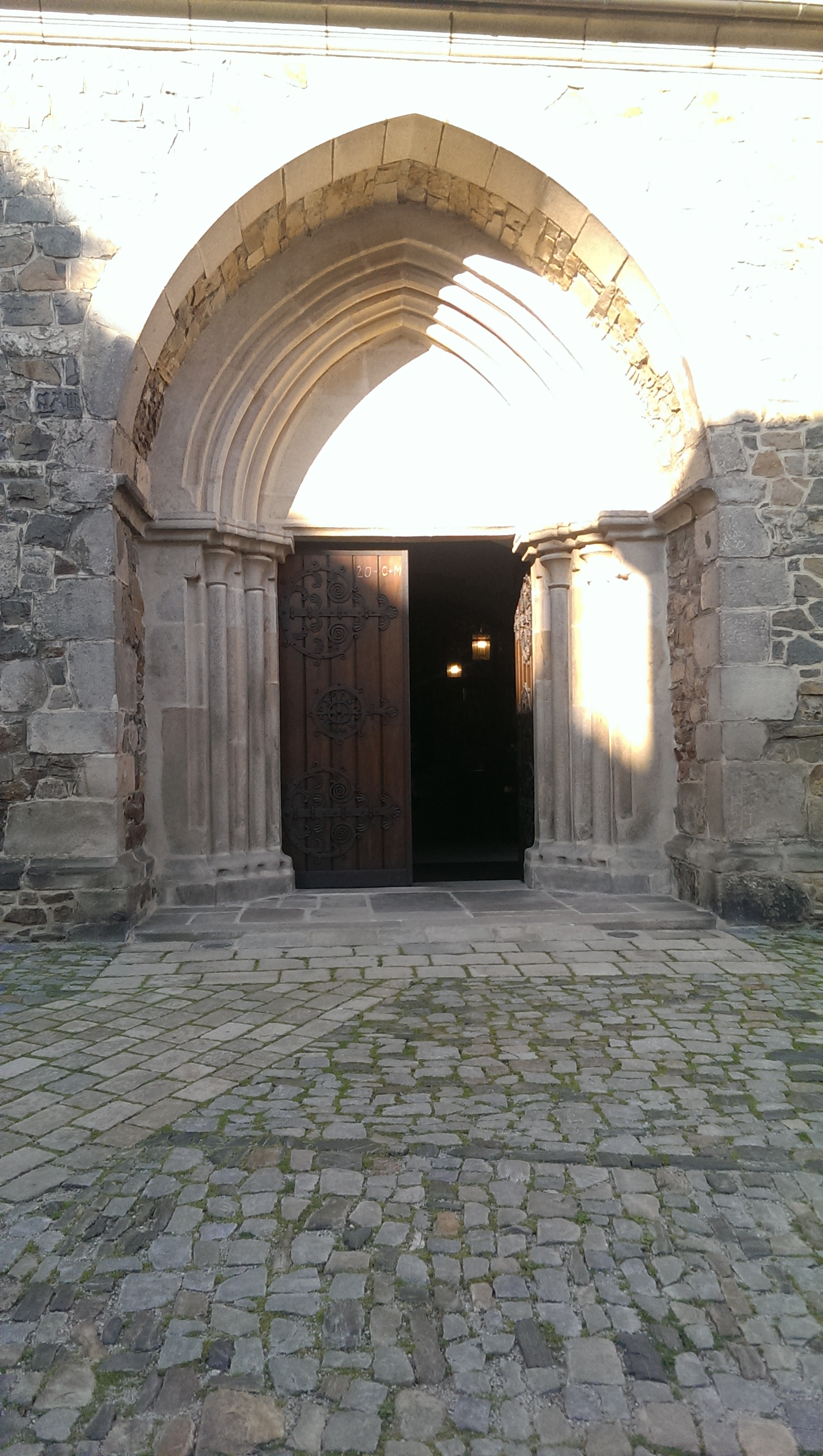
Entrance portal

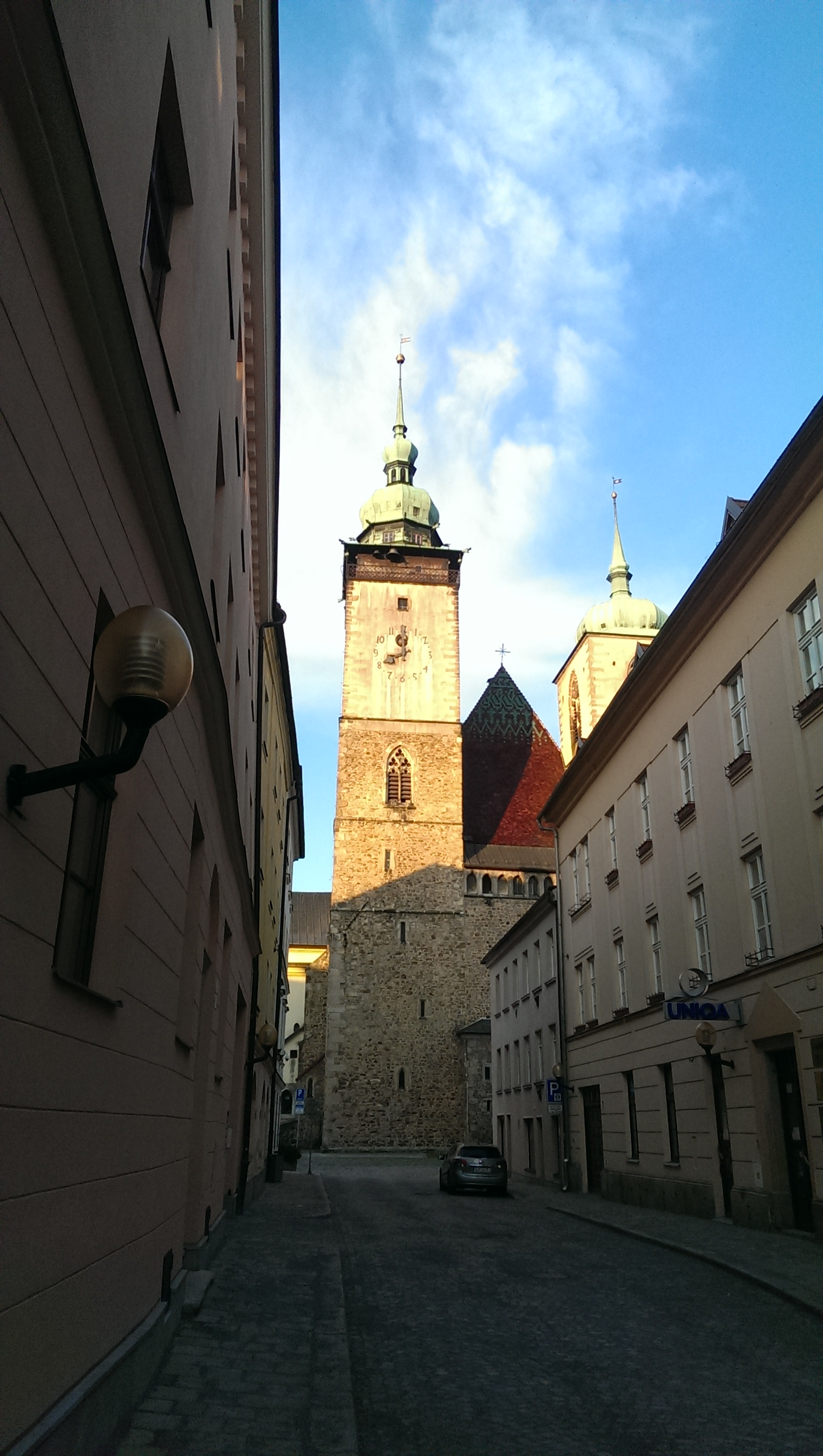
Lookout tower

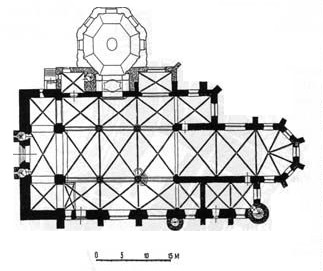
Ground plan

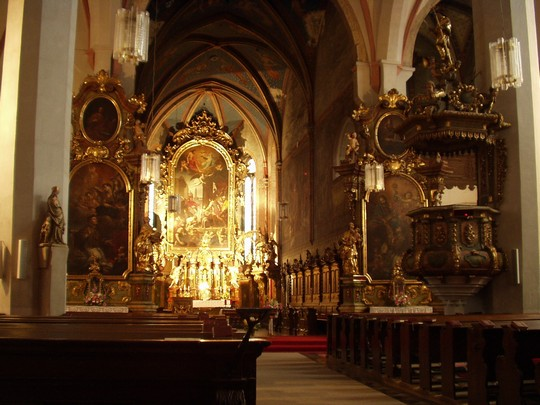
Interior

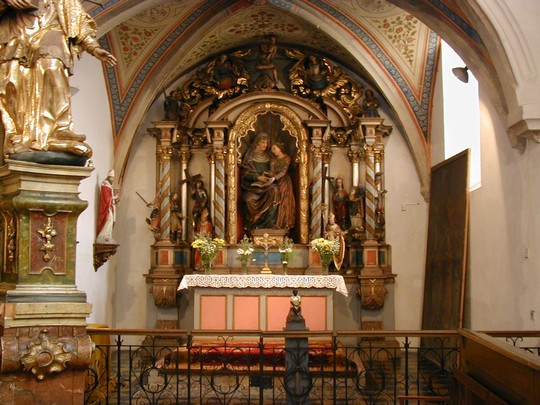
Side altar

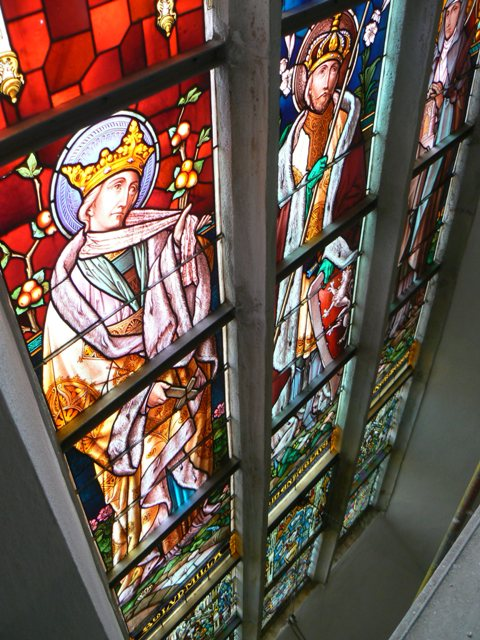
Vitrage

== See also ==
- Gothic architecture
- Catholic Church in the Czech Republic
- Gothic architecture in Czech Republic

== Sources ==
=== Bibliography ===
- MAŠÁT, Jiří. Chrám svatého Jakuba v Jihlavě: Die Jakobskirche in Iglau. Jihlava: Astera G, 2008. ISBN 978-80-903833-4-0.
- JAROŠ Zdeněk: Kostel sv. Jakuba v datech, Jihlava 1994
- SAMEK, Bohumil. Umělecké památky Moravy a Slezska 2 J/N. Praha: Academia, 1999. ISBN 80-200-0695-8.
- KUNC, Vladimír. Jihlava - město v srdci Vysočiny: Jihlava - town at the heart of the Vysočina; Jihlava - Stadt im Herzen von Vysočina. Havlíčkův Brod: FotoKunc, 2013. ISBN 978-80-905429-1-4.

=== External links ===
- Where to go in Jihlava - Saint James the Elder
- gustav-mahler.eu
- Strahov Monastery
- Leisure Jihlava* The tower of Jihlava
- svjakub.cz
