= Marelli Europe =

Italian manufacturer of automotive components

Marelli Europe S.p.A.
- Type: Subsidiary
- Industry: Automotive
- Founded: 1919; 107 years ago
- Founder: Fiat and Ercole Marelli
- Headquarters: Corbetta, Lombardy, Italy
- Key people: Ermanno Ferrari (CEO)
- Products: Automotive components
- Revenue: € 7.3 billion (2015)
- Owner: KKR
- Number of employees: 40,500 (2015)
- Parent: Marelli Holdings
- Subsidiaries: AL-Automotive Lighting; Weber
- Website: www.marelli.com

Marelli Europe S.p.A. (formerly Magneti Marelli S.p.A.) is a European subsidiary of Marelli Holdings which develops and manufactures components for the automotive industry. The firm is headquartered in Corbetta, Italy, and includes 86 manufacturing plants, 12 R&D centres, and 26 application centers in 19 countries, with 43,000 employees and a turnover of 7.9 billion euros in 2016.

Historic Magneti Marelli products, preserved and exhibited at Museo nazionale della scienza e della tecnologia Leonardo da Vinci, Milan

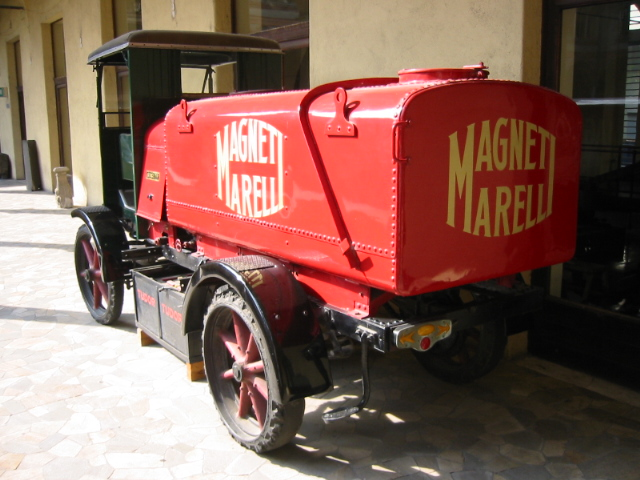
Car

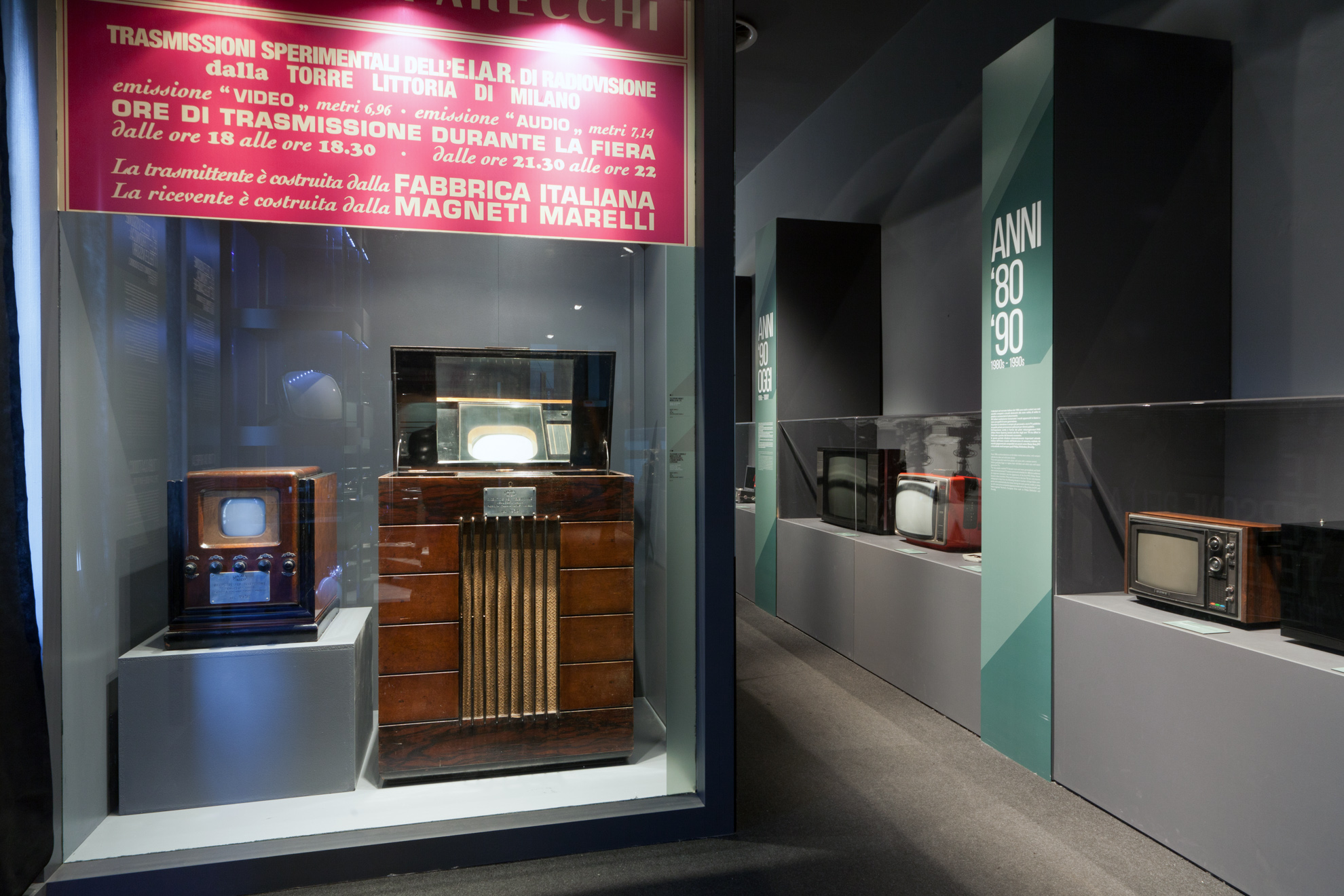
Television sets

Subsidiaries and brands of the company include AL-Automotive Lighting, Carello, Cromodora, Cofap, Ergom Automotive, Jaeger, Mako Elektrik, Paraflu, Securvia, Seima, Siem SpA, Solex, Veglia Borletti, Vitaloni, and Weber.

== History ==
Founded in 1919 as Fabbrica Italiana Magneti Marelli (FIMM), a joint-venture between Fiat and Ercole Marelli (1891–1993), an Italian electrical manufacturing company, the firm initially made ignition magnetos for the automotive and aviation industries, with its first plant in Sesto San Giovanni near Milan.

It was a subsidiary of FIAT (now Stellantis) from 1967 onwards.

On 22 October 2018, FCA announced that Magneti Marelli was being bought by KKR, to be merged with the Japanese automotive company Calsonic Kansei for $7.2 billion, a deal that would create one of the world's largest auto parts suppliers.

In May 2019, Magneti Marelli and Calsonic Kansei merged to form Marelli.

== Current work ==
As of 2019, Magneti Marelli deals with intelligent systems for active and passive vehicle safety, and with powertrain systems. Business lines include automotive lighting systems, body control systems, powertrain control systems, electronic instrument clusters, telematics systems, and computers, suspension systems and components, exhaust systems, and motorsport, wherein Magneti Marelli develops specific electronic systems for Formula One, Grand Prix motorcycle racing and the World Rally Championship.

Magneti Marelli worked with Ford Motor Company and Microsoft (Windows Embedded Automotive, formerly Microsoft Auto), to develop an in-dash computer (carputer) for Ford's work truck division introduced in 2008, with a built-in 6.5-inch, high-resolution touch screen and Bluetooth, USB connectivity, GPS navigation, voice recognition, and general office applications, e.g., word processing, contact, and calendar. In 2023, Magneti Marelli fired 140 workers at its Niehl plant near Cologne, Germany.

== See also ==
- List of companies of Italy
