= Marelli Holdings =

Multinational automotive parts manufacturer

Marelli Holdings, Co., Ltd.
- Native name: マレリホールディングス株式会社
- Romanized name: Mareri Hōrudingusu Kabushiki kaisha
- Formerly: Calsonic Kansei Corporation (2000–2019); Marelli Corporation (2019–2020)
- Type: Private KK
- Industry: Automotive
- Predecessors: Calsonic Corporation; Kansei Corporation; Magneti Marelli
- Founded: August 25, 1938; 88 years ago
- Headquarters: 2-1917 Nisshin-cho, Kita-ku, Saitama, Saitama, 331-0823 Japan
- Area served: Worldwide
- Key people: Frederick Henderson (CEO)
- Products: Cockpit modules; Air conditioning units; Compressors; Heat exchanger products; Exhaust systems; Emission control devices
- Revenue: ▲US$ 8.91 billion (FY 2013) (JPY 918.7 billion) (FY 2013)
- Net income: ▲US$ 242 million (FY 2013) (JPY 25 billion) (FY 2013)
- Owner: KKR
- Number of employees: 22,382 (as of March 31, 2019)
- Website: www.marelli.com

Marelli Holdings Co., Ltd. (マレリホールディングス株式会社, Mareri Hōrudingusu Kabushiki kaisha), formerly Calsonic Kansei Corporation, is a Japan-based multinational automotive parts manufacturer with 58 manufacturing centres spread throughout the United States, European Union, South Korea, Mexico, Thailand, South Africa, India, China, and Malaysia.

The corporation was the result of a merger in 2000 between Calsonic Corp., which specialized in air conditioners and heat exchangers, and gauge maker Kansei Corp.. Nissan increased its shareholding in the company from 27.6 percent to 41.7 percent in January 2005. In November 2016, Nissan confirmed plans to sell its stake to U.S. private equity firm Kohlberg Kravis Roberts, who later obtained the rest of the company as well in February 2017.

In early 2019, Calsonic Kansei was merged with auto-parts maker Magneti Marelli, which was purchased for 6.2 billion euros from Fiat Chrysler Automobiles, by its parent and 100% owning fund, KKR, with Marelli as its new unified brand.

== History ==
On August 25, 1938, Calsonic Corp. was founded as Nihon Radiator Manufacturing Company, Ltd., with radiators as its product line. Nagao Gentaro was its first president. In 1952, the company was renamed more simply as Nihon Radiator Company. Nissan Motor would purchase 60% of the company's share in April 1954 for the purpose of securing the supply of radiators. That same year, Nihon Radiator began producing mufflers, and a year later it began producing car heaters.

The name "Calsonic" was first used in 1976 to refer to Nihon Radiator's first overseas manufacturing plant in California within the United States, combining the state's name with the word "sonic" from sonic speed to denote the company's dream of expansion. By 1988, Nihon Radiator changed its name to Calsonic Corporation in celebration of its 50th anniversary.

Kansei Corp. was established on October 25, 1956 as Kanto Seiki Company, Ltd., spinning off of Nissan Motor with instrument clusters as its main product. In 1960, the company headquarters and manufacturing plant would be relocated from Akabane, Kita, Tokyo Metropolis to Ōmiya City, Saitama Prefecture (now Saitama City).

On April 1, 2000, Calsonic and Kansei were merged to form Calsonic Kansei. Nissan increased its shareholding in the company from 27.6 percent to 41.7 percent in January 2005.

On November 22, 2016, American investment firm KKR & Co. announced that it will purchase Calsonic Kansei for $4.5 billion, succeeding over rival private investment firms Bain Capital and MBK Partners. KKR stated that its intention in buying Calsonic Kansei would be to help its international expansion while the company's local Japanese market is shrinking. By March 23, 2017, KKR officially completed the tender offer for Calsonic Kansei.

On October 22, 2018, Calsonic Kansei announced that it would be merged with components manufacturer Magneti Marelli from Fiat Chrysler Automobiles (FCA), acquired by the parent fund KKR for $7.1 billion (€6.2 billion). The news was mostly wrongly reported by the press as Calsonic Kansei purchasing Magneti Marelli, while the transaction happened between KKR and FCA. The company's previous bid of nearly $5.9 billion was deemed too low by FCA. By May 2019, Calsonic Kansei and Magneti Marelli united under one brand name, Marelli, as part of its strategy to compete on a global scale.

On June 7, 2025, Marelli Holdings warned that it may file for Chapter 11 bankruptcy protection in the US. On June 11, 2025, Marelli Holdings filed for Chapter 11 bankruptcy protection with plans to eliminate debt and sell itself to new owners.

On July 31, 2025, Marelli Holdings received final court approval to receive up to $1.1 billion in debtor in possession financing from its lenders. In June 2026, as the company was approaching a bankruptcy exit, negotiations were being discussed by Nissan and Stellantis to acquire Marelli's assets.

== Business segments and products ==
=== Cockpit module and interior products ===
- Instrument panels
- Air conditioning units
- Instrument clusters
- Integrated switches

=== Climate control systems ===
- HVAC units
- Condensers
- Compressors

=== Compressors ===
- Variable displacement compressors
- Rotary compressors

=== Heat exchange products ===
- Radiators
- Condensers
- Motor fans
- Internal air coolers
- Oil coolers
- Evaporators

=== Electronic products ===
- Body Electronics
  - Body Control Modules
  - Auto Driving Position Systems
  - Airbag Control Units
  - Occupant Detection Systems
  - Keyless entry
- Human Machine Interface components
- Power electronics components

=== Exhaust systems ===
- Exhaust manifold converters
- Mufflers
- Emission control devices

== Sponsorship ==
Calsonic Kansei is primarily associated with Kazuyoshi Hoshino's Impul racing team in Japan, sponsoring them as Calsonic since 1982 as a title sponsor. By 2016, Calsonic Kansei is the longest-running title sponsor of a motor sports team in the world. As of 2023, Marelli became the main sponsor of the team, as the "Marelli, formerly Calsonic" depicts on the team's racing car.

On March 9, 2016, Formula One racing team McLaren announced a multi-year partnership with Calsonic Kansei.

Calsonic is also the official radiator cooling supplier for Scuderia Toro Rosso since 2007.

== See also ==
- Bosch (company)
- Impul
- Magneti Marelli
