= New world lexicon of Tolnai =

The New world lexicon of Tolnai (Hungarian "Tolnai új világlexikona") is an old Hungarian lexicon series, in fact a renewed and expanded edition of the former World lexicon of Tolnai. Under the name Tolnai lexicon, we usually think of this series, not only because the previous initiative was unfortunately interrupted, but also because its material is fresher, it does not overlap so much with its predecessors.

== Electronic edition ==
The work does not have a reprint edition, but it does have an electronic edition. This is available on Arcanum.hu, in the form of a fee. The series can be considered common in antique shops, so obtaining original pieces is still relatively easy today.

== Order of volumes ==
Volume Number	Volume title	Year of publication	Number of pages
Volume I	A–Bad	1926	320
Volume II	Bad–Bur	1926	320
Volume III	Bur–Don	1926	320
Volume IV	Don–Fel	1926	320
Volume V	Fel–Gőz	1926	320
Volume VI	Gőz–Hit	1927	320
Volume VII	Hit–Jós	1927	320
Volume VIII	Jós–Kob	1927	320
Volume IX	Kob–Lak	1927	320
Volume X	Lak–Mag	1928	320
Volume XI	Mag–Men	1928	320

Volume Number	Volume title	Year of publication	Number of pages
Volume XII	Men–Ném	1928	320
Volume XIII	Ném–Őr	1928	320
Volume XIV	Őr–Rák	1929	320
Volume XV	Rák–Sör	1929	320
Volume XVI	Sör–Táv	1929	320
Volume XVII	Táv–Vég	1930	320
Volume XVIII	Vég–Zs	1930	320
Volume XIX	Additional Volume I, A–H	1933	320
Volume XX	Additional Volume II, H–Zs	1933	320

== Sources ==
=== Egyéb hivatkozások ===
- Tolnai világlexikona CD-ROM. Szöveg és kép. Budapest, Woodstone Interactive Kft., 1999. (1 CD-ROM) – Eredeti nyomtatott kiadása: „Tolnai új világlexikona” Budapest, Tolnai, 1926-1933.
- Tolnai világlexikona CD-ROM. Budapest, Channel 42, 1999., Digitális lexikon sorozat (1 CD-ROM).
- volumes of the work
