= Rosalia Graf =

Austrian domestic servant and factory worker

Rosalia Graf (born Rosalia Moser: 1 June 1897 - 21 June 1944) was an Austrian domestic servant and factory worker who became a resistance activist some time after the incorporation of Austria into an enlarged version of Germany in March 1938. On 14 April 1944 both she and her husband faced trial and were convicted of "preparing to commit high treason". They were sentenced to death at the recently reconfigured Vienna district court. On 21 June 1944, within a few minutes of one another, they were executed (along with fourteen others convicted on similar charges), using the guillotine in the execution facility in another part of the extensive court complex.

== Life ==
Rosalia Moser was born in Breitenbrunn/Fertőszéleskút, the daughter of Mathias Moser, a small-scale farmer, and his wife, Elisabeth. Breitenbrunn, then as now, was a small village located by the marshy northern foreshore of the Neusiedlersee/Fertő (Lake) in the ethnically conflicted Burgenland/Gradišće/Felsőőrvidék region. At the time of her birth it was within the Austro-Hungarian empire, part of the Kingdom of Hungary (though it would in 1922 pass to the newly reconfigured Austrian Republic following a referendum). School attendance was compulsory: Rosalie Moser attended local school for the stipulated period and then took work as a domestic servant, working at different stages in Hungary and Austria. At some point she relocated to Vienna, becoming an unskilled factory worker.

In 1930 Rosalia Moser married Johann Graf, who had grown up in Vienna, and was working for the city authorities. Rosalia was almost ten years older than her husband. According to later court documents, the marriage was childless. They made their home in an apartment at Johnstraße 34/36 in Vienna's west-central Rudolfsheim-Fünfhaus quarter. By 1934 Johann and Rosalia Graf were both members of the Social Democratic Party. 1934 is of particular significance as the year during which the Social Democratic Party was outlawed, as part of a broader political transition to what came to be known as "Austrofascism". Any further political involvement by the Grafs would have taken place, as far as possible, "beneath the radar" at the time: court documents submitted in the context of the couple's prosecution in 1944 assert that they continued to use the apartment for "political discussions", notably involving their friends and fellow resistance activists Anton and Emilie Tolnay. The intensity of the "political discussions" increased after the invasion of Poland in September 1939 triggered the outbreak of war, and discussions intensified further in June 1941 when a massive German invasion of the Soviet Union indicated that the implausible non-aggression pact between Berlin and Moscow was over. In June 1941 Johann and Rosalie Graf announced to comrades their "membership" to the (illegal) Communist Party and, as a sign of solidarity, made their apartment available as accommodation for party comrades needing a safe house, and for clandestine party meetings.

During the night of 1 May 1942 the Grafs took part in a leafleting campaign: this will have involved distributing copies of politically incendiary information sheets in public places, such as park benches, public toilets, train stations, trams and tram stops. Surveillance of government opponents by the security services in Vienna had become ever more effective, and it is likely that the authorities were already aware of the Grafs' opposition activities, but detailed investigation into the provenance and distribution of the anti-Hitler leaflets will have increased their knowledge and the extent of the surveillance to which the couple were subjected. The wording of the leaflet reads like a calculated attempt to provoke the authorities:

"With a great cry, Hitler announces another military offensive. That means a new round of blood sacrifice for our young people. It means, too, more victims from among us, the workers, and more suffering. Workers! Never forget this bloodshed. Fight with us against Hitler! He alone is the murderer of our young people. Sabotage the Hitler war machine wherever you can! At work, do your job as slowly as possible! Every increase in output simply prolongs the war!" (Note: "Mit großem Geschrei kündigt Hitler eine neue Offensive an, Das bedeutet neue Blutopfer für unsere Jugend. Das bedeutet aber auch neue Opfer, neues Elend für uns Arbeiter und Arbeiterinnen. Arbeiter und Arbeiterinnen! Denkt stets an dieses Blutvergießen. Kämpft mit uns gegen Hitler! Er allein ist der Mörder unserer Jugend. Sabotiert Hitlers Kriegsmaschinerie, wo ihr nur könnt! Arbeitet so langsam wie nur möglich! Jedes Stück mehr verlängert den Krieg!.")

Slightly more than ten weeks after the leafleting incident, on 15 July 1942, Johann and Rosalia Graf were arrested on "suspicion of preparing high reason". Their details were recorded, they were photographed and they were interrogated by the Vienna Gestapo. The senior state prosecutor brought charges against them at the special People's Court on 22 December 1943. Following conviction, they were sentenced to death on 14 April 1944, found guilty of "preparing high treason and advantaging the enemy". (Note: "Vorbereitung zum Hochverrat und Feindbegünstigung") Others sentenced to death by the People's Court at the same hearing included Emilie Tolnay and Therese Dworak, whom the authorities had also identified (correctly) as anti-government resistance activists with communist beliefs. (Emilie's husband, Anton Tolnay received a ten-year jail term (but was released a year later when the régime collapsed).

On 21 June 1944 Johann and Rosalia Graf were led to the killing table in the execution department of the Vienna district court complex where they were executed on the guillotine within a few minutes of one another. They were included in a batch of 16 execution victims killed (some sources use the word "murdered") by the Hitler state on that occasion. Others included their co-accused, Therese Dworak and the brothers Johann and Josef Knize. Emilie Tolnay underwent the same fate a few days later, on 5 July 1944.
