= World lexicon of Tolnai =

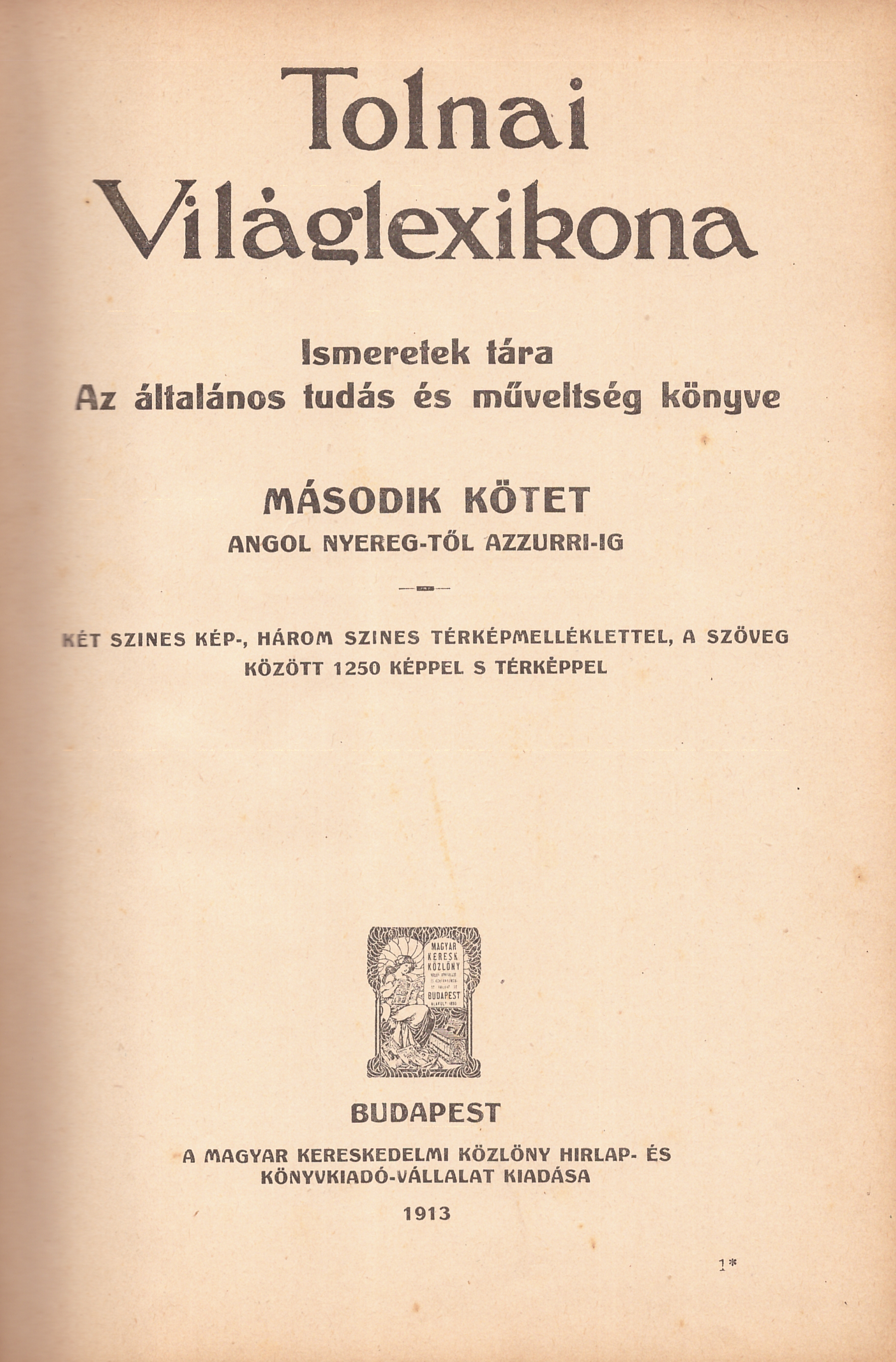

The World lexicon of Tolnai (Hungarian "Tolnai világlexikona"), after a long preparatory work, was first published in 1912, when only 8 volumes were published. The publication of additional volumes that had already been prepared was prevented by the First World War, largely rendering obsolete the contents of the published and still edited volumes of the series.

The editorial of the lexicon, considering the circumstances, decided not to end the series but to restart it (with a more concise volume breakdown). The result of this decision was the New world lexicon of Tolnai.

== Order of volumes ==
Volume Number	Volume title	Year of publication	Number of pages
Volume I	A–Angol nyelvtan	1912	768
Volume II	Angol nyereg–Azzurri	1913	672
Volume III	B–Betegápolás	1913	640
Volume IV	Betegápolás–Brüsszel	1914	640
Volume V	Brüsszel–Cimer	1914	640
Volume VI	Cimer–Csipke	1915	640
Volume VII	Csipke–Dísztűz	1916	640
Volume VIII	Dithirambus–Eke	1919	640
