= AL-Automotive Lighting =

German manufacturer of automotive lamps

Coordinates: 49.4427°N 15.6125°E

Marelli Automotive Lighting Reutlingen (Germany) GmbH
- Trade name: Marelli Automotive Lighting
- Type: Subsidiary
- Industry: Automotive
- Founded: 1999
- Founders: Magneti Marelli and Robert Bosch GmbH
- Headquarters: Reutlingen, Germany
- Products: automotive lighting
- Number of employees: 20,000
- Parent: Marelli
- Website: www.marelli.com

Marelli Automotive Lighting is an automotive lighting company that is based in Germany. It was founded in 1999 as a 50-50 joint venture between the Italian firm Magneti Marelli and the German firm Robert Bosch GmbH (K2 Lighting division).

In 2001, Magneti Marelli raised its share to 75% after the acquisition of Seima Group. In 2003, Automotive Lighting became fully owned by Magneti Marelli. Since 2019, after the merger of Magneti Marelli and Calsonic Kansei the one-company's name is Marelli.

Automotive Lighting was the first company to introduce rear LED lights in 2003 for the Peugeot 307 CC, and the first full-LED headlamp in mass production for the Audi R8 in 2008.
