= Emilie Tolnay =

Austrian hairdresser

Emilie Tolnay (born Emilie Müller; 6 October 1901 – 5 July 1944) was an Austrian hairdresser who by the time of the German annexation in 1938 had become a resistance activist. She died on the guillotine in the Vienna district court complex.

== Biography ==
Emilie Müller was born at Jihlava (German: Iglau). She completed her compulsory schooling and, in 1916, embarked on the first of a succession of unskilled jobs in industry. In 1922 she trained and qualified as a hairdresser, working in the profession till 1926. That was the year in which she married the bakery assistant Anton Tolnay (1893–?).

Parliamentary democracy in the recently much diminished state of Austria was widely associated with military defeat and acute economic austerity. It was not universally popular. In March 1933 the so-called Self-elimination of the Austrian Parliament effectively marked a major step towards an Austrian adaptation of Italian Fascism. Among the politically engaged it was the socialists and communists who were most active in opposing the cancellation of democracy in Austria. During 1936 Anton and Emilie Tolnay were arrested by the government authorities on suspicion of having been politically active on behalf of the (by this time illegal) Communist Party. They were released after four months in detention.

In March 1938, Austria became part of an enlarged Nazi Germany following an annexation which progressed without much effective opposition from the Austrian political establishment. On 14 July 1942 Anton and Emilie Tolnay were arrested again. Most of the surviving evidence on their political activism comes from the indictment presented on 22 December 1943 by the Chief Prosecutor, when the Tolnays faced trial at the Vienna branch of the special People's Court. They had "participated in the reorganisation of the illegal [anti-government] resistance struggle during 1941 and 1942". They had provided support for the wanted Communist official, Adolf Neustadtl, "and enabled Neustadtl to regain physical strength" (by supplying him with food). The prosecutor made clear the assessment that Anton Tolnay was strongly influenced by his "mentally far superior" wife. The case was also made that Emilie Tolnay had successfully recruited Rosalia and Johann Graf to work with the illegal "Communist Opposition".

On 14 April 1944, the People's Court sentenced Emilie Tolnay to death. Comrade activists who received the same sentence included Therese Dworak, Rosalia Graf and Johann Graf. The charge on which they were convicted was the usual one of "preparing to commit high treason and favouring the enemy" ("Vorbereitung zum Hochverrat und Feindbegünstigung"). Anton Tolnay received a ten-year jail term (but was released a year later when the régime collapsed). On 5 July 1944 Emilie Tolnay was executed on the guillotine which had been moved into the Vienna district court complex in 1938, shortly after the German annexation of Austria into Nazi Germany.
