= Renault Kangoo =

Range of multi-purpose vehicles

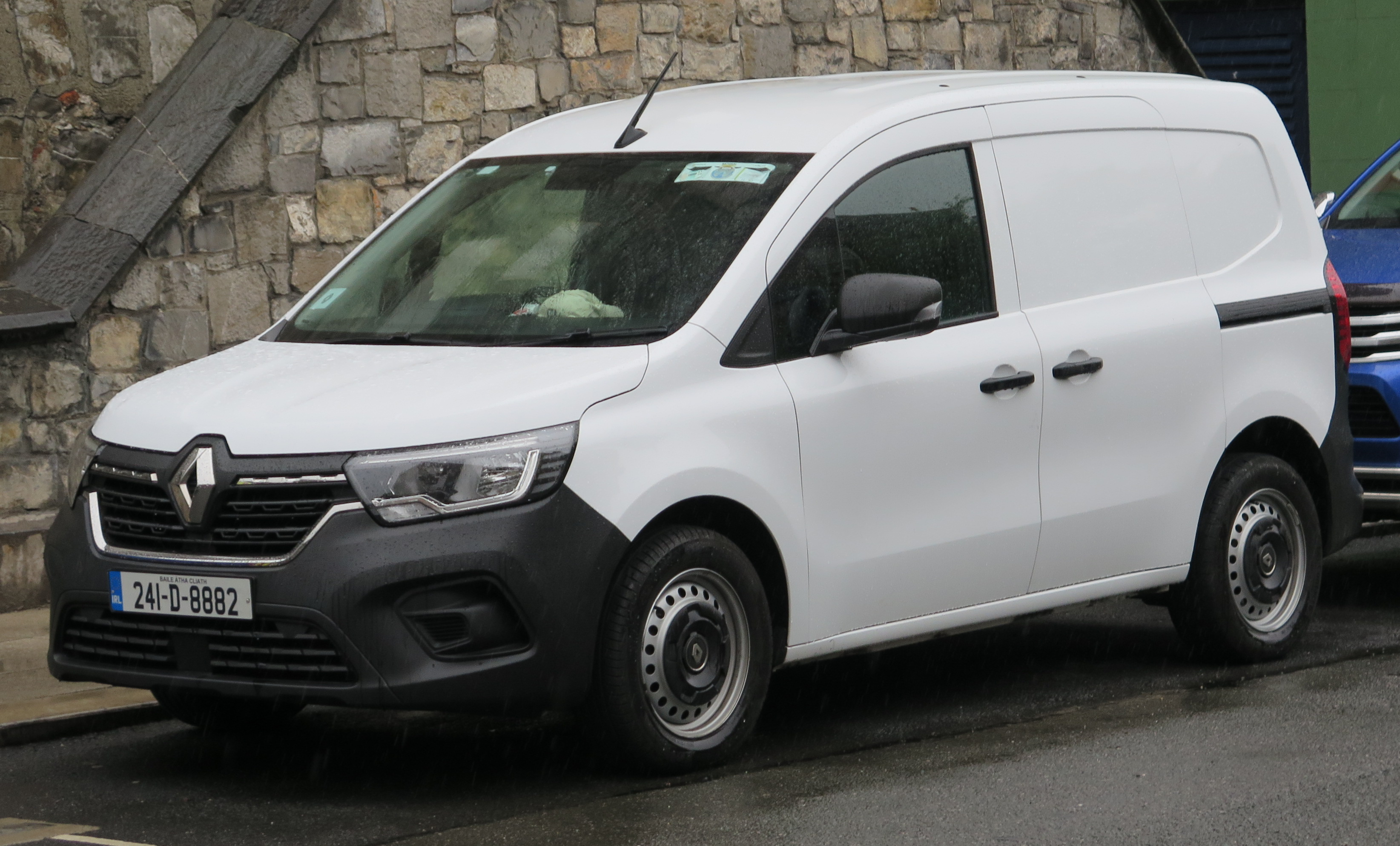

Overview
- Manufacturer: Renault
- Production: 1997–present

Body and chassis
- Class: Multi-purpose vehicle/Light commercial vehicle (M)
- Body style: 4/5-door minivan
- Layout: Front-engine, front-wheel drive Front-engine, four-wheel drive (2001–present)

Chronology
- Predecessor: Renault Express

The Renault Kangoo is a family of minivans built by Renault since 1997 across three generations. It is sold as a passenger multi-purpose vehicle or as a light commercial vehicle. For the European market, the Kangoo is manufactured at the MCA plant in Maubeuge, France.

The Kangoo was also marketed as a rebadged variant by Nissan in Europe as the Nissan Kubistar (first generation), Nissan NV250 (second generation) and Nissan Townstar (third generation). In September 2012, Mercedes-Benz began marketing a rebadged variant of the second generation Kangoo as the Mercedes-Benz Citan, which is also marketed as Mercedes EQT and Mercedes T-Class for the current generation.

As of June 2023, the electric variant, the Renault Kangoo Z.E., is Europe's top selling all-electric light commercial vehicle, with over 100,000 units produced.

== First generation X76 (FC/KC; 1997) ==
First generation
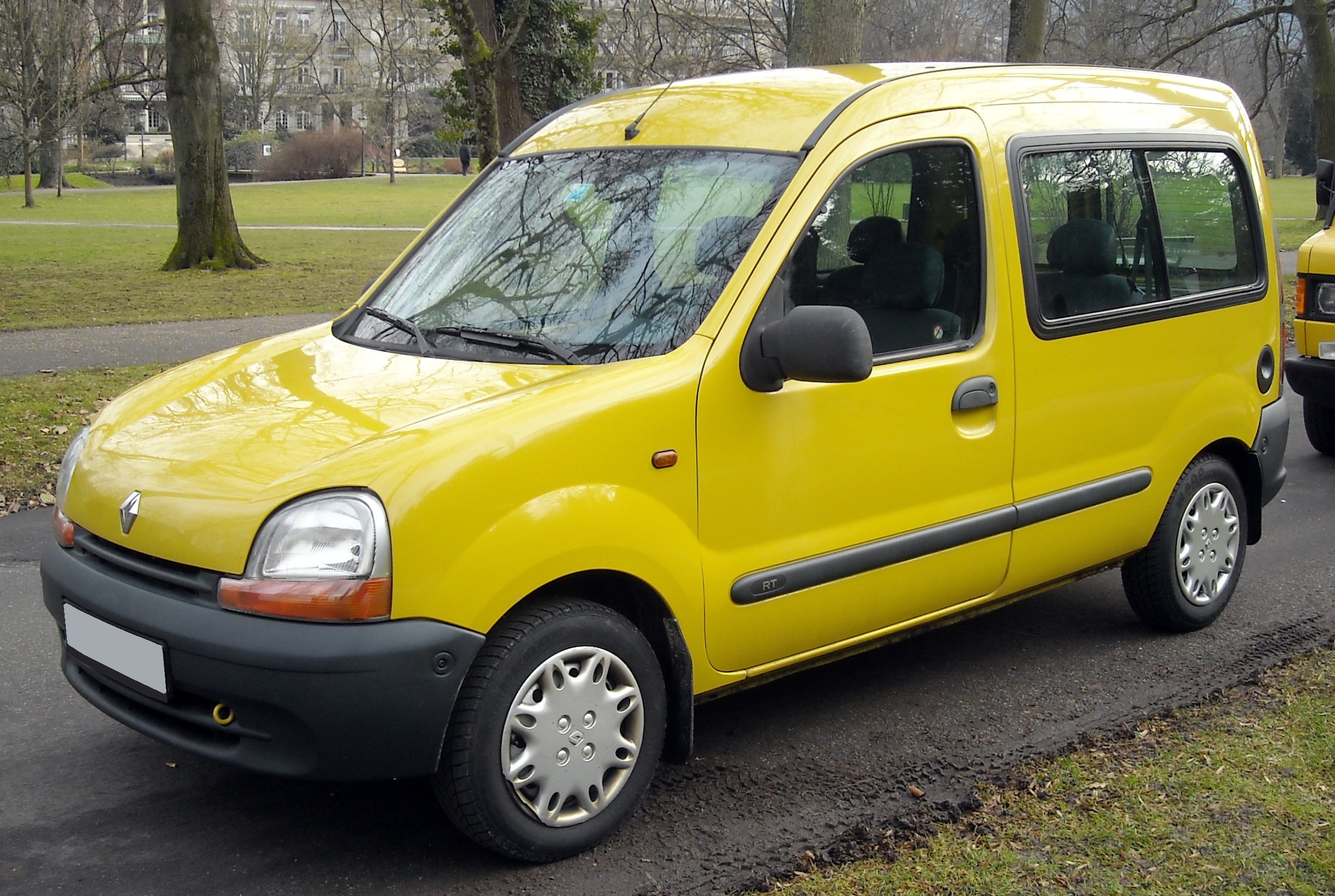

Overview
- Also called: Nissan Kubistar; Elect'road
- Production: 1997–2009 (Europe); 1998–2018 (Latin America); 2003–2009 (Nissan Kubistar)
- Assembly: France: Maubeuge (MCA); Argentina: Santa Isabel (Renault Argentina – 1998–2018); Morocco: Casablanca (Somaca); Malaysia: Kuala Lumpur (TCEC)

Body and chassis
- Body style: 4/5-door minivan 5-door LAV
- Related: Renault Clio II (X65)

Powertrain
- Engine: Petrol: 1.2 L E5F I4; 1.2 L D4F I4; 1.4 L E7J (Energy series) I4; 1.6 L K4M I4; Diesel: 1.5 L K9K I4; 1.9 L F8Q I4; 1.9 L F9Q I4 (4x4 only); petrol-PHEV: 0.5 L Lombardini LGW523 MPI I2
- Electric motor: Permanent-magnet brushless DC motors
- Transmission: 5-speed Manual; 4-speed Automatic
- Hybrid drivetrain: PHEV (Elect'road)
- Battery: 13.2 kWh Ni-Cd

Dimensions
- Wheelbase: 2,605 mm (102.6 in)
- Length: 4,035 mm (158.9 in)
- Width: 1,670 mm (65.7 in)
- Height: 1,800 mm (70.9 in)

Chronology
- Successor: Nissan NV200 (for Nissan Kubistar); Renault Kangoo II (Argentina)

The first-generation Kangoo was introduced in October 1997, and was facelifted in March 2003, with new front end nose styling, especially the grille, standardised across the Renault range, with the Renault diamond mounted on a body colour panel in the centre of the grille and teardrop headlamps.

The rear windows and seats of the Kangoo could be removed, producing the panel van Kangoo Express. The Kangoo became popular with mobility-impaired people and wheelchair users due to its height and accessibility and because it could be adapted to include mounting points for wheelchairs. The rear of the vehicle is cut to allow a ramp to be fitted. A pair of front tie downs are fitted (retractable seat belts with a solenoid release to allow them to be extended, passed around the wheelchair frame and then locked back when the solenoid is switched off and they retract); this stops the wheelchair from moving back. A pair of rear tie downs with the normal clamping buckles stop the wheelchair from moving forward. A normal, long seat belt is worn by the wheelchair user.

Both the Kangoo and Kangoo Express were available in four-wheel drive versions. A lengthened version was also available, with an increased cargo area. A pickup version was sold in the Swedish market. In some countries, such as Malaysia, the Kangoo was assembled by Nissan with third row seats.

From July 2003, Wallace and Gromit starred in adverts in the United Kingdom for the Kangoo.

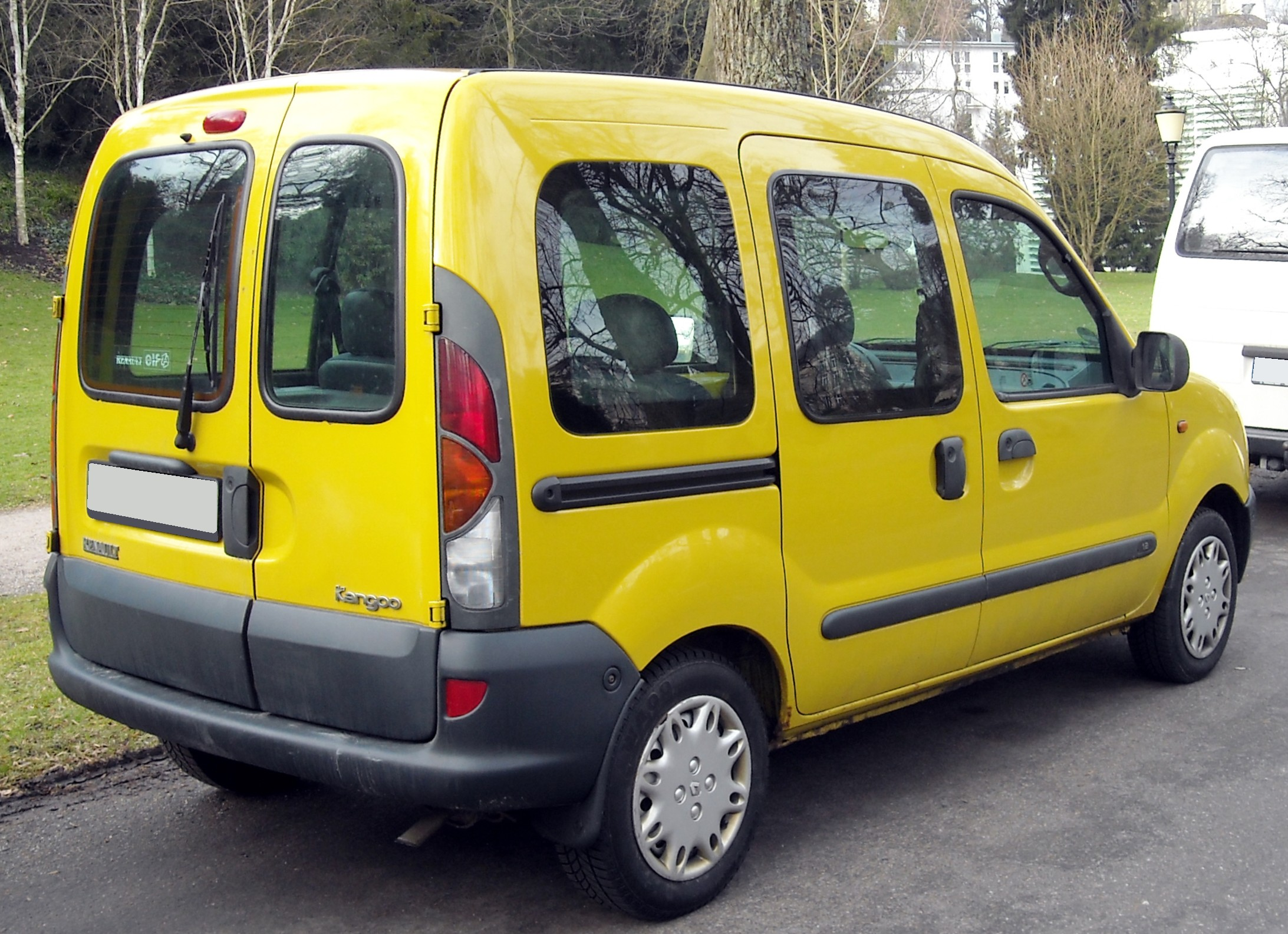
Kangoo (pre-facelift)

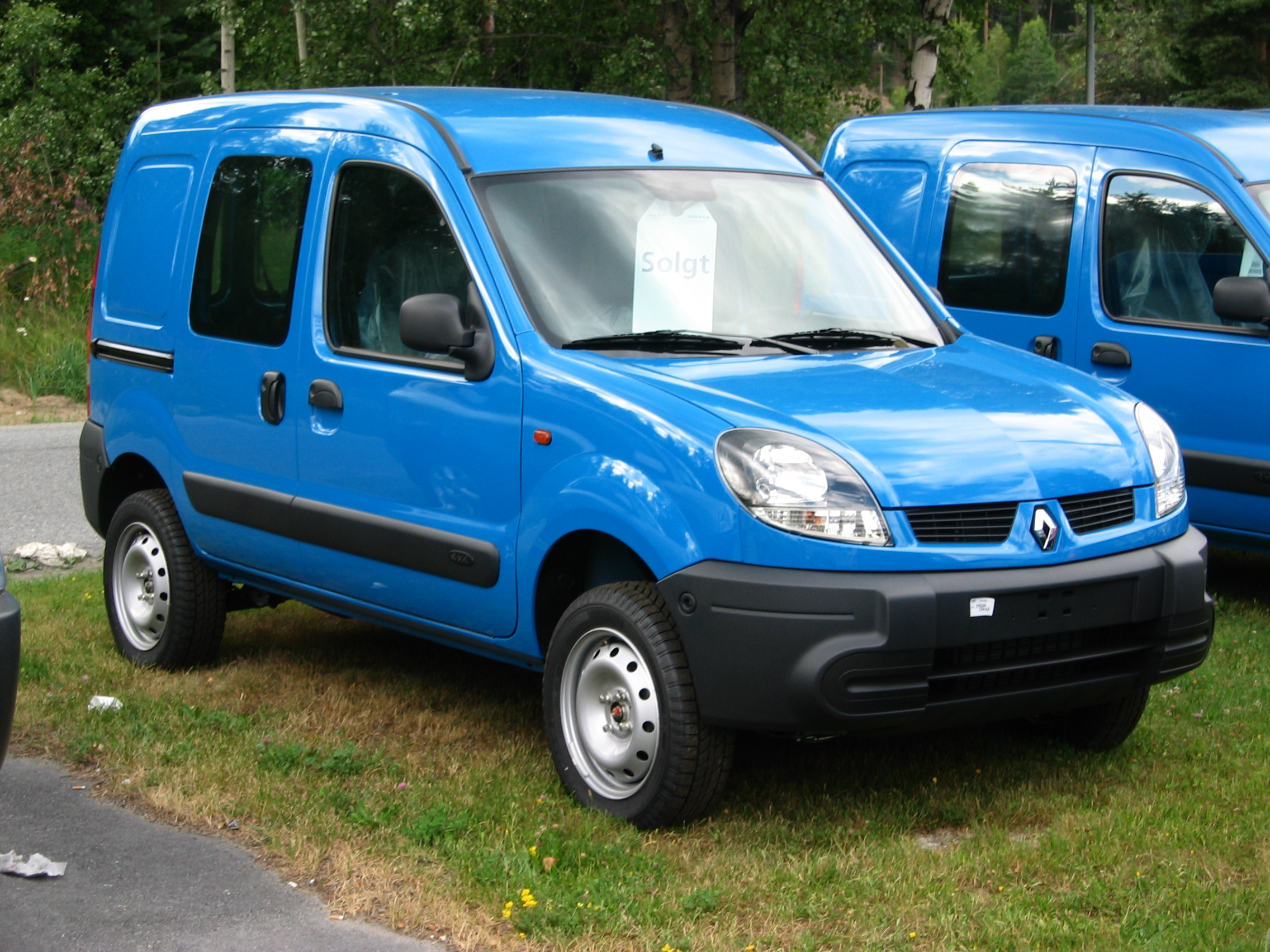
Kangoo Van (first facelift)

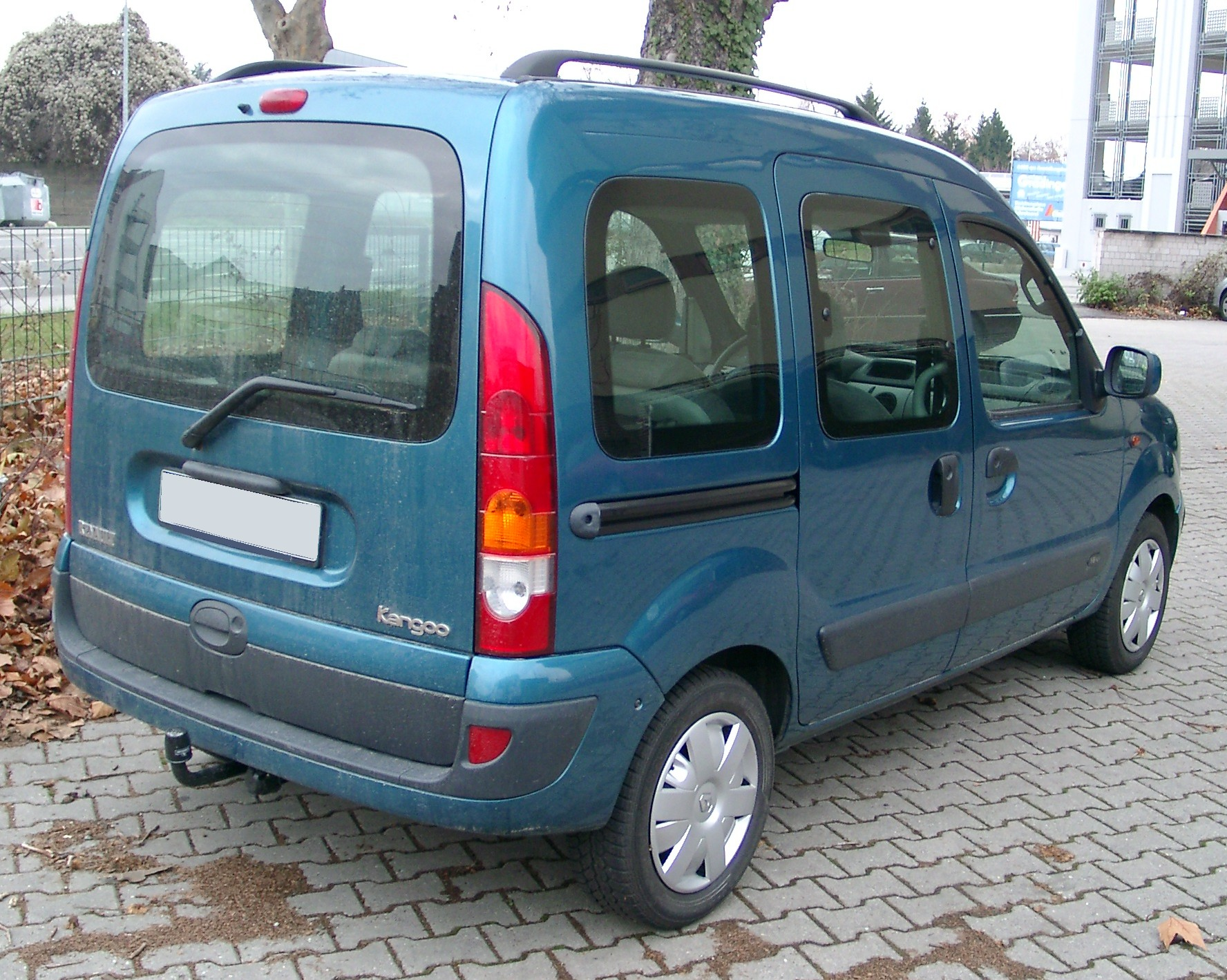
Rear view

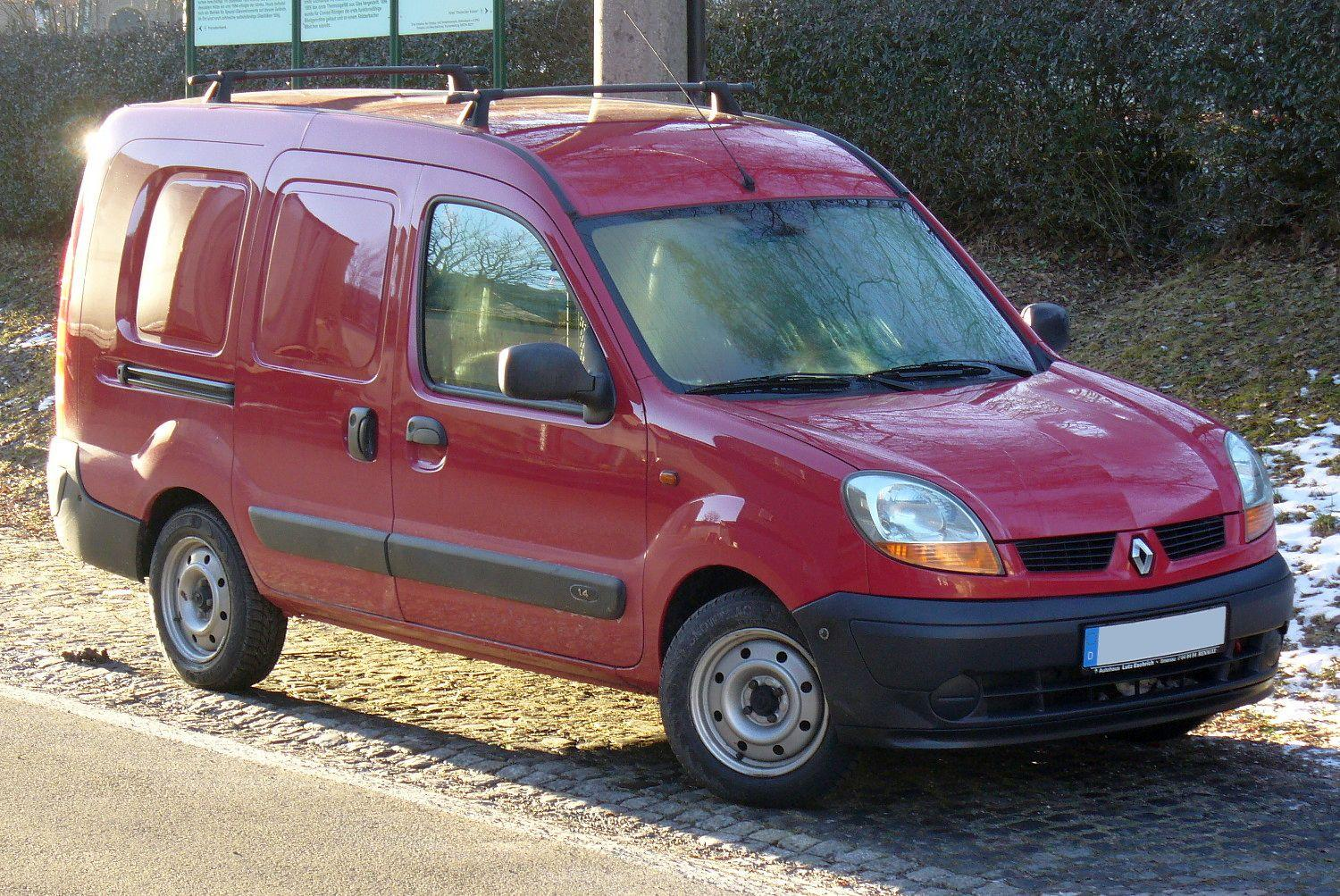
Grand Kangoo

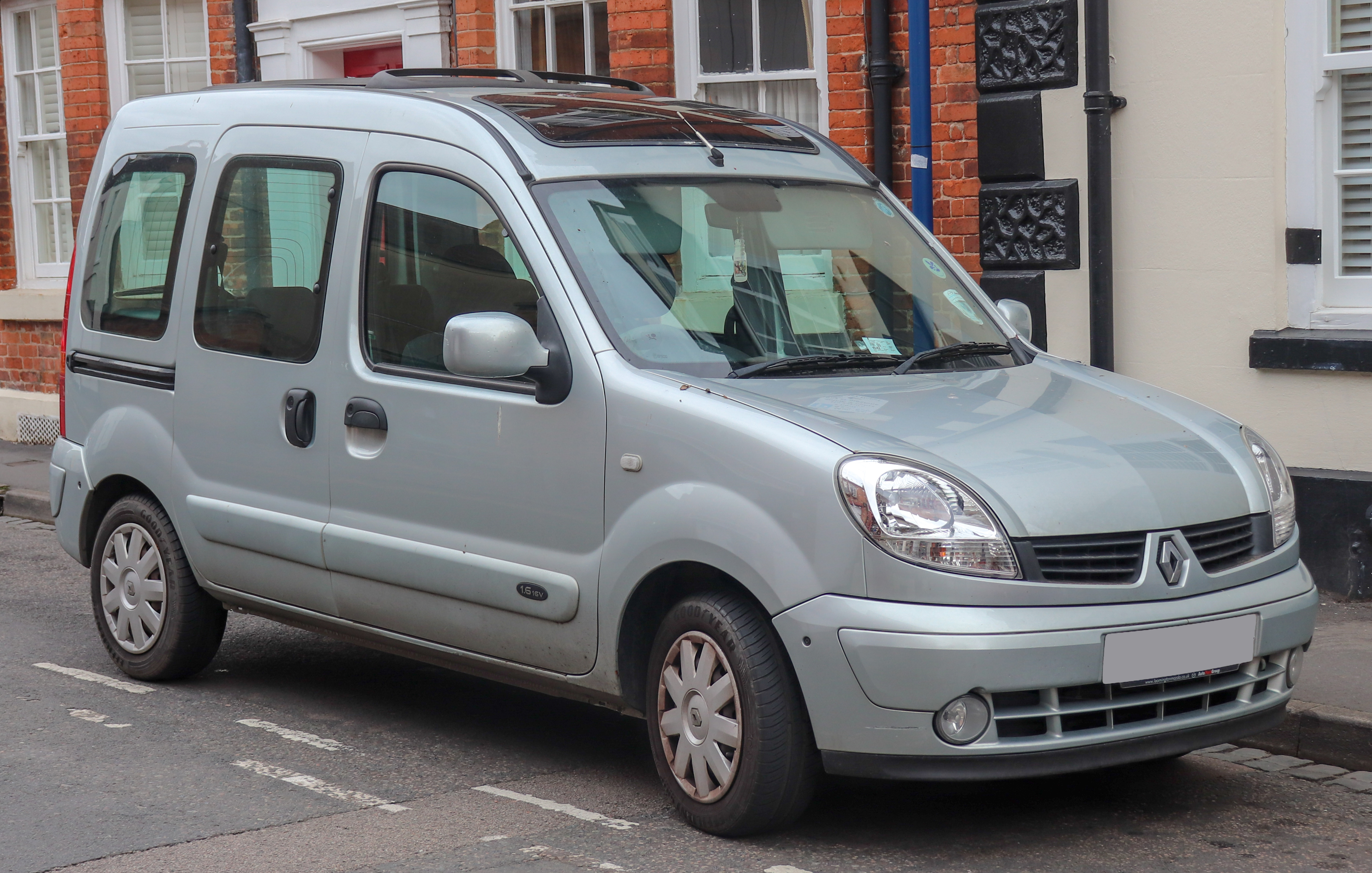
Kangoo (second facelift)

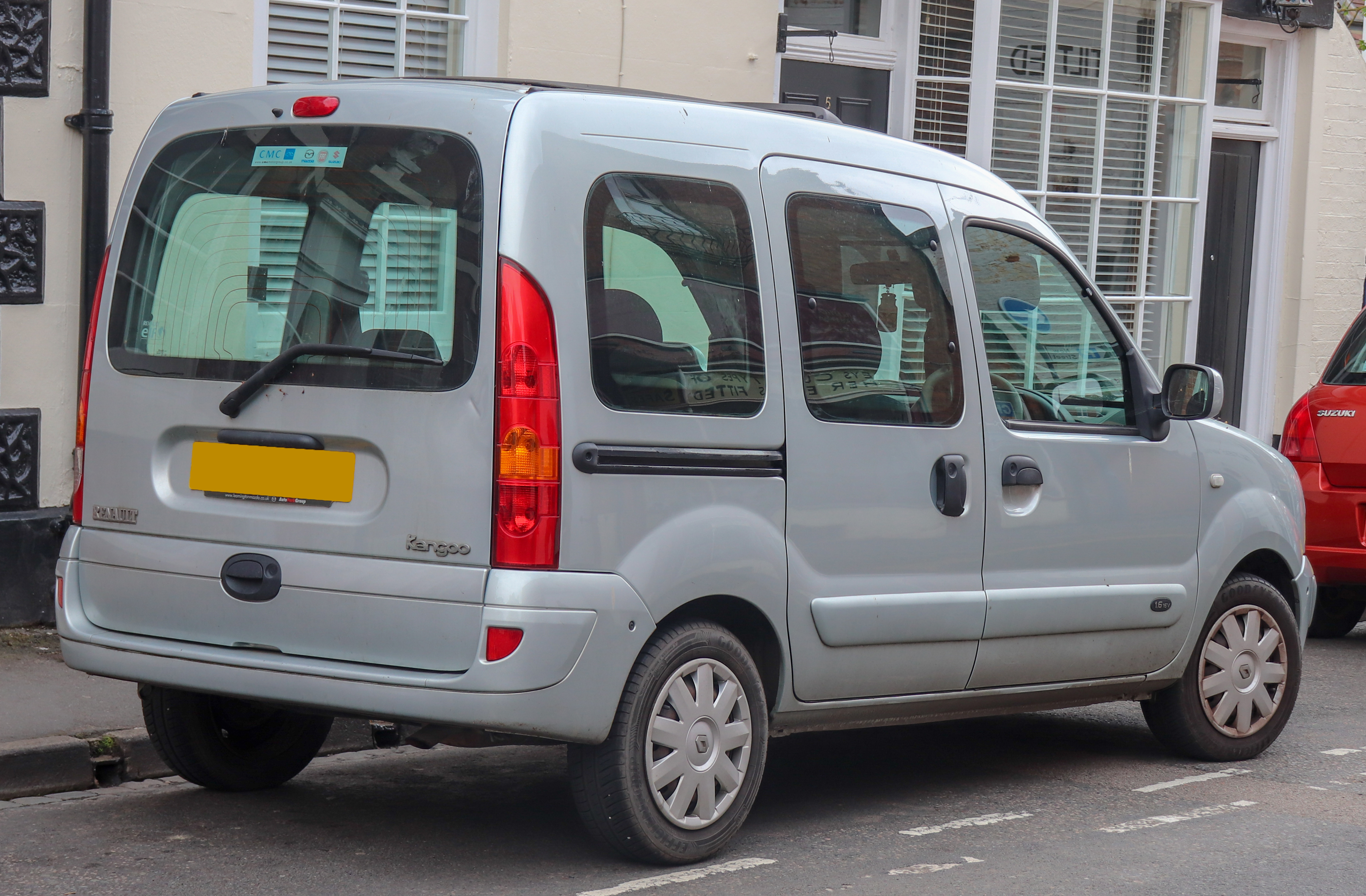
Rear view

=== Break'Up ===
The Kangoo Break'Up was a four-wheel drive concept car announced in August 2002 and previewed the facelift design due in 2003, together with a pick up-style rear. It was powered by a 1.6 L engine producing 82 kW (110 hp).

=== Kangoo Trekka 4x4 ===
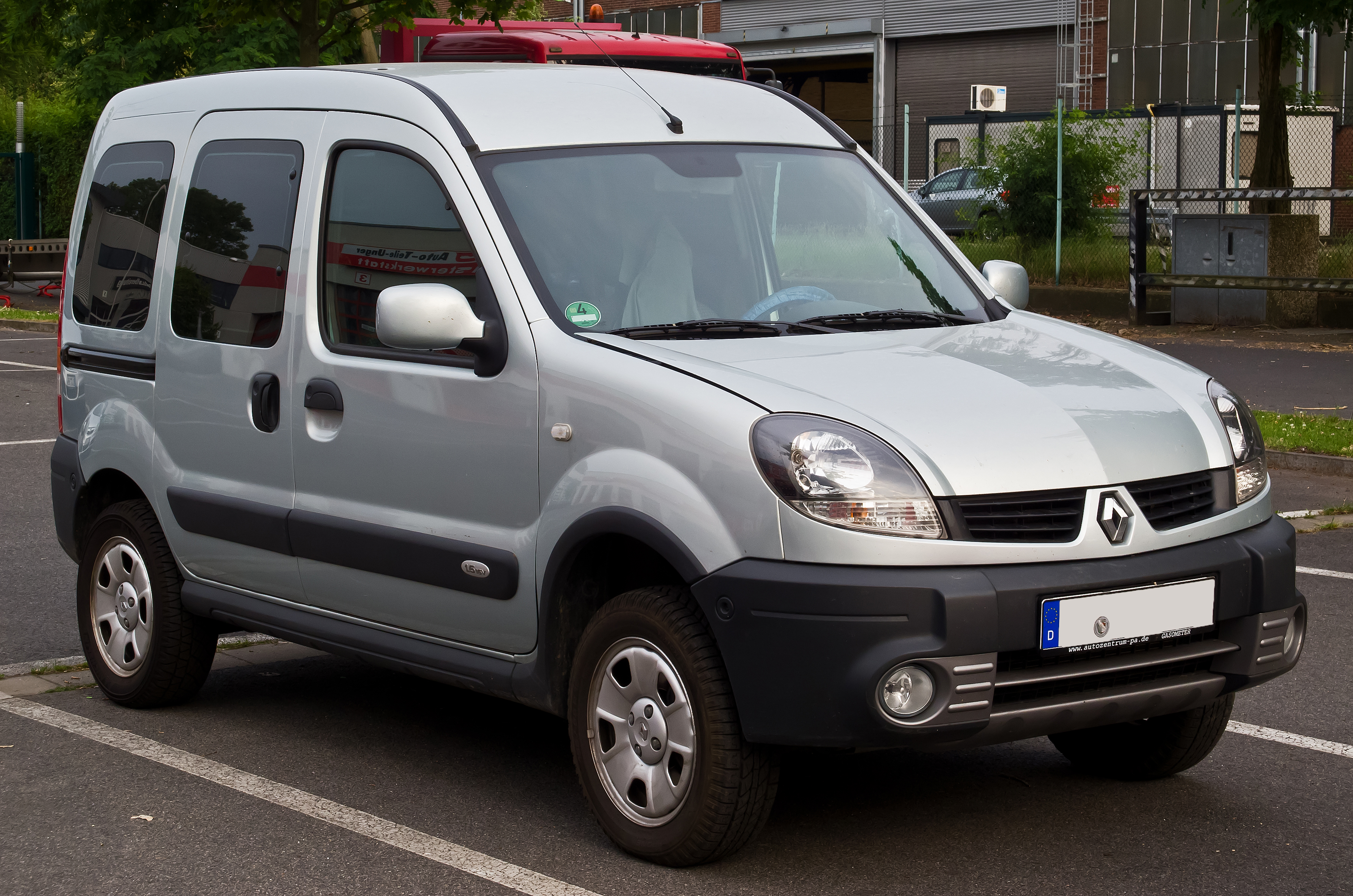
Kangoo Trekka 4x4 (first facelift)

The 4WD version of the Kangoo was introduced in 2002, and was marketed under the model name Trekka. It should not be confused with the Skoda-powered New Zealand-built utility vehicle named Trekka, which was marketed in the Antipodes for several years around 1970.

The Kangoo Trekka's all-wheel drive system differed from the Renault Scénic RX4 in its inclusion of a Nissan-sourced automatic torque coupling "ATC", a hydraulic coupling that would engage drive on all four wheels should the front wheels start to lose traction.

This allowed the Kangoo Trekka to run in front-wheel drive in most conditions, thus saving fuel. Working in combination with the ATC, the Kangoo Trekka featured an electronically controlled "ASR" traction control system which could brake the front wheels to arrest traction loss.

The suspension on the front had longer front struts with revised coil springs, lower suspension arms were revised to a cast steel item. The rear suspension was completely revised from the standard Kangoo torsion bar suspension beam axle to a fully independent coil-sprung system with wishbones. The rear differential was centrally mounted with two driveshafts transmitting power to the rear wheels. All this was carried on a subframe which increased the ground clearance and wheel travel.

These changes gave the Kangoo Trekka a 400 mm (15.7 in) fording depth and 28 degree hill climbing capability. The Kangoo Trekka was marketed in the UK with a choice of two engines, the 1.6 litre 16 valve petrol engine and the 1.9 L dCi common rail turbodiesel, both with a five speed manual gearbox.

In 2005, these models were priced at £12,600 and £13,600 respectively. The diesel produced a peak torque of 180 N⋅m (133 lb⋅ft) and achieved over 7 L/100 km (40 mpg_{‑imp}; 34 mpg_{‑US}) on the combined (urban and extra urban) fuel consumption test.

The petrol engine had a 0–100 km/h (62 mph) time of 14.3 seconds, and a combined fuel consumption of 9 L/100 km (31 mpg_{‑imp}; 26 mpg_{‑US}). The interior of the Kangoo Trekka was spartan. The rear bench seat could be folded forward to provide a 2.5 m^{3} (88 ft^{3}) loading area, with better access through the sliding side doors.

=== Argentina ===
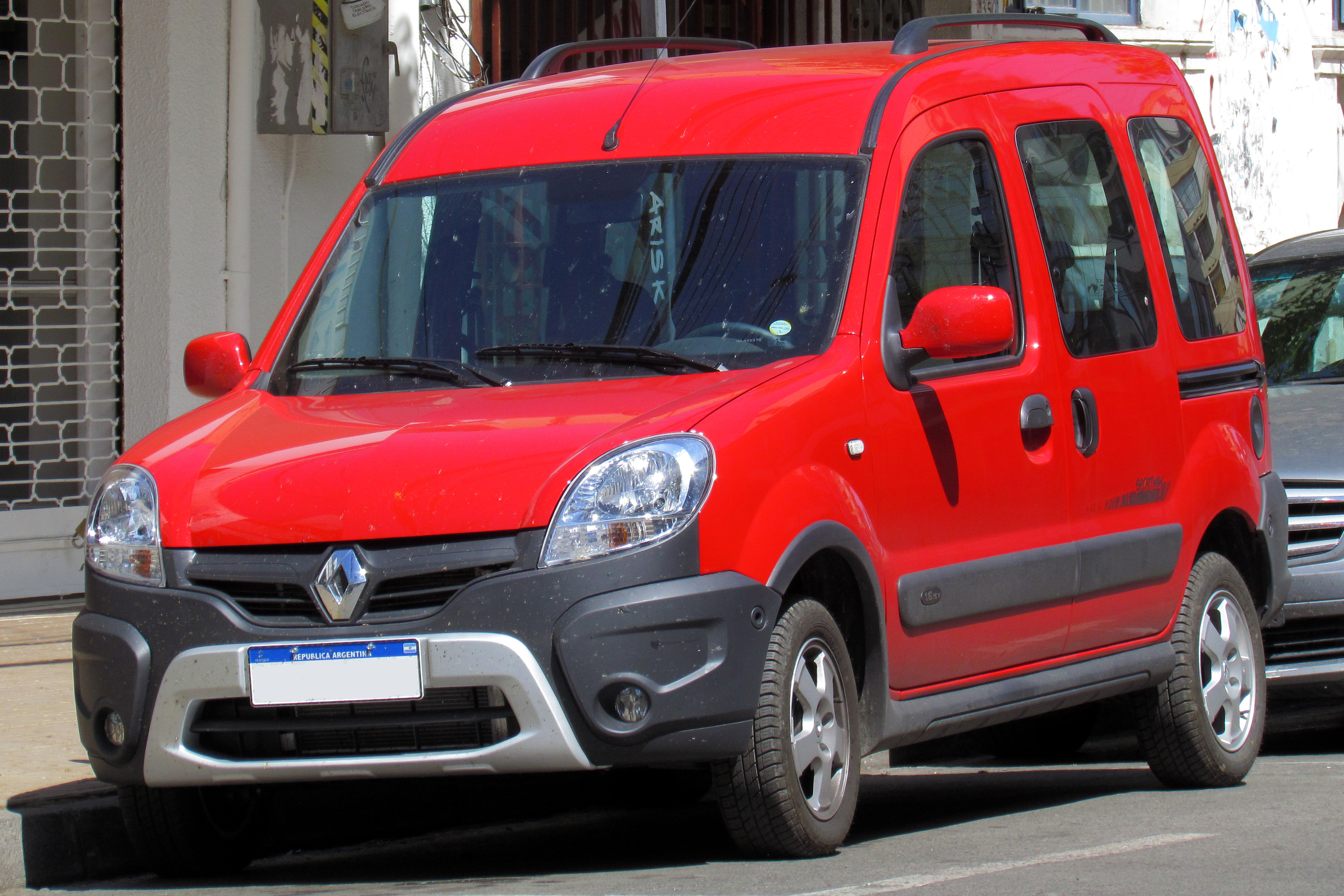
Kangoo Sportway

The first-generation Kangoo was produced in Argentina from 1998 to 2018. The panel van production was launched in 1998, and the passenger model in 2001. It received a first facelift in 2008. A second facelift internally codenamed VLL ("Very Long Life") was unveiled in 2013 exclusively for the Argentine market, featuring styling cues from Renault's then-current design language. It was discontinued in 2018 to make way for its replacement, based on the Dokker, after 374 591 units had been produced in Argentina for the local market, and some other Latin America countries (Brazil, Uruguay, Paraguay, Colombia, Chile, Mexico and Cuba).

=== Engines ===
The Kangoo and Kangoo Express were available with a choice of multiple engines:

=== Kangoo data sandbox ===
Engines
Model	Engine	Displ.	Layout	Fuel system	Max power at rpm	Max torque at rpm	Transmission	Top speed	Years	Note
Petrol engines
1.0 60	D7D	999 cc	SOHC 8v I4	Fuel injection, naturally aspirated	59 PS (43 kW; 58 hp) at 5,500 rpm	81 N⋅m (60 lb⋅ft) at 4,250 rpm	5-speed manual	135 km/h (84 mph)	2000–20xx	Brazil only
1.0 16V 70	D4D	999 cc	DOHC 16v I4	Fuel injection, naturally aspirated	68 PS (50 kW; 67 hp) at 5,750 rpm	93 N⋅m (69 lb⋅ft) at 4,500 rpm	5-speed manual	144 km/h (89 mph)	200x–20xx	Brazil only
1.2 60	D7F	1149 cc	SOHC 8v I4	Fuel injection, naturally aspirated	60 PS (44 kW; 59 hp) at 5,250 rpm	93 N⋅m (69 lb⋅ft) at 2,500 rpm	5-speed manual	135 km/h (84 mph)	1997–2005	
1.2 16V 75	D4F	1149 cc	DOHC 16v I4	Fuel injection, naturally aspirated	75 PS (55 kW; 74 hp) at 5,500 rpm	106 N⋅m (78 lb⋅ft) at 3,500 rpm	5-speed manual	144 km/h (89 mph)	2001–2008	
1.4 75	E7J	1390 cc	SOHC 8v I4	Fuel injection, naturally aspirated	75 PS (55 kW; 74 hp) at 5,500 rpm	114 N⋅m (84 lb⋅ft) at 4,250 rpm	5-speed manual 4-speed automatic	155 km/h (96 mph); AT: 147 km/h (91 mph)	1997–2001	Automatic since Dec. 1999
1.4 75	E7J	1390 cc	SOHC 8v I4	Fuel injection, naturally aspirated	75 PS (55 kW; 74 hp) at 6,000 rpm	107 N⋅m (79 lb⋅ft) at 4,000 rpm	5-speed manual	155 km/h (96 mph)	2001–2003	Latin America
1.4 75	K7J	1390 cc	SOHC 8v I4	Fuel injection, naturally aspirated	75 PS (55 kW; 74 hp) at 5,500 rpm	114 N⋅m (84 lb⋅ft) at 2,800 rpm	4-speed automatic	AT: 147 km/h (91 mph)	2001–2003	
1.6 90	K7M	1598 cc	SOHC 8v I4	Fuel injection, naturally aspirated	90 PS (66 kW; 89 hp) at 5,250 rpm	133 N⋅m (98 lb⋅ft) at 2,500 rpm	5-speed manual		1998–2003	South America
1.6 16V 95	K4M	1598 cc	DOHC 16v I4	Fuel injection, naturally aspirated	95 PS (70 kW; 94 hp) at 5,000 rpm	148 N⋅m (109 lb⋅ft) at 3,750 rpm	5-speed manual 5-sp manual, 4WD; 4-speed automatic	160 km/h (99 mph); 4×4: 153 km/h (95 mph); AT: 152 km/h (94 mph)	200x–2003	From 2003 until 2018 in Argentina; 170km/h top speed
Diesel engines
1.5 dCi 55	K9K	1,461 cc	SOHC 8v I4	Common rail turbo	55 PS (40 kW; 54 hp) at 4,000 rpm	130 N⋅m (96 lb⋅ft) at 2,000 rpm	5-speed manual	138 km/h (86 mph)	2004–2005	
1.5 dCi 60	K9K	1,461 cc	SOHC 8v I4	Common rail turbo	61 PS (45 kW; 60 hp) at 4,000 rpm	130 N⋅m (96 lb⋅ft) at 2,000 rpm	5-speed manual	140 km/h (87 mph)	2005–2008	
1.5 dCi 65	K9K	1,461 cc	SOHC 8v I4	Common rail turbo	65 PS (48 kW; 64 hp) at 4,000 rpm	160 N⋅m (118 lb⋅ft) at 2,000 rpm	5-speed manual	146 km/h (91 mph)	2002–2005	
1.5 dCi 70	K9K	1,461 cc	SOHC 8v I4	Common rail turbo	68 PS (50 kW; 67 hp) at 4,000 rpm	160 N⋅m (118 lb⋅ft) at 2,000 rpm	5-speed manual	148 km/h (92 mph)	2005–2008	
1.5 dCi 80	K9K	1,461 cc	SOHC 8v I4	Common rail turbo	80 PS (59 kW; 79 hp) at 4,250 rpm	185 N⋅m (136 lb⋅ft) at 1,750 rpm	5-speed manual 5-sp manual, 4WD	155 km/h (96 mph); 4×4: 144 km/h (89 mph)	2003–2005	
1.5 dCi 80	K9K	1,461 cc	SOHC 8v I4	Common rail turbo	82 PS (60 kW; 81 hp) at 4,250 rpm	185 N⋅m (136 lb⋅ft) at 1,750 rpm	5-speed manual	155 km/h (96 mph)	2002–2003	
1.5 dCi 85	K9K	1,461 cc	SOHC 8v I4	Common rail turbo	85 PS (63 kW; 84 hp) at 4,250 rpm	185 N⋅m (136 lb⋅ft) at 1,750 rpm	5-sp manual, 4WD	4×4: 146 km/h (91 mph)	2005–2008	
1.9 D Eco	F8Q	1,870 cc	SOHC 8v I4	Indirect injection diesel	55 PS (40 kW; 54 hp) at 4,000 rpm	120 N⋅m (89 lb⋅ft) at 2,250 rpm	5-speed manual	139 km/h (86 mph)	1998–1999	
1.9 D	F8Q	1,870 cc	SOHC 8v I4	Indirect injection diesel	64 PS (47 kW; 63 hp) at 4,500 rpm	120 N⋅m (89 lb⋅ft) at 2,250 rpm	5-speed manual	145 km/h (90 mph) from 2001: 143 km/h (89 mph)	1997–2003	
1.9 dTi	F9Q	1,870 cc	SOHC 8v I4	Direct injection, turbo	80 PS (59 kW; 79 hp) at 4,500 rpm	160 N⋅m (118 lb⋅ft) at 2,000 rpm	5-speed manual	160 km/h (99 mph)	1999–2002	
1.9 dCi 4×4	F9Q	1,870 cc	SOHC 8v I4	Common rail turbo	80 PS (59 kW; 79 hp) at 4,000 rpm	180 N⋅m (133 lb⋅ft) at 2,000 rpm	5-sp manual, 4WD	4×4: 142 km/h (88 mph)	2001–2003	
1.9 dCi 4×4	F9Q	1,870 cc	SOHC 8v I4	Common rail turbo	84 PS (62 kW; 83 hp) at 4,000 rpm	180 N⋅m (133 lb⋅ft) at 2,000 rpm	5-sp manual, 4WD	4×4: 146 km/h (91 mph)	2003–2006	
Model	Charger	Battery	Range	Motor	Max. power at rpm	Max. torque at rpm	Consumption	Top speed	Years	Notes
Electric
Electri'Cité	2.2/3.5 kW	Ni-Cd, 13.2 kW-hr	80–100 km (50–62 mi)	battery electric	25 kW (34 PS; 34 hp)	165 N⋅m (122 lb⋅ft)	25 kW⋅h/100 km (0.90 MJ/km)	110 km/h (68 mph)	2023	
Elect'road RE	2.2/3.5 kW	Ni-Cd, 13.2 kW-hr	80–100 km (50–62 mi) >200 km (124 mi)	plug-in hybrid: 505 cc, Lombardini I2	Motor: 25 kW (34 PS; 34 hp); Engine: 16 kW (22 PS; 21 hp)	Motor: 165 N⋅m (122 lb⋅ft); Engine: 35 N⋅m (26 lb⋅ft)	25 kW⋅h/100 km (0.90 MJ/km)	110 km/h (68 mph)	2023–2024	~500 built

Some LPG and CNG variants of petrol engines have also been produced.

=== Nissan Kubistar ===
A badge-engineered version of the Kangoo panel van was sold as the Nissan Kubistar in many European markets from 2003 to 2009. Nissan applied the "X76" model code to the Kubistar.

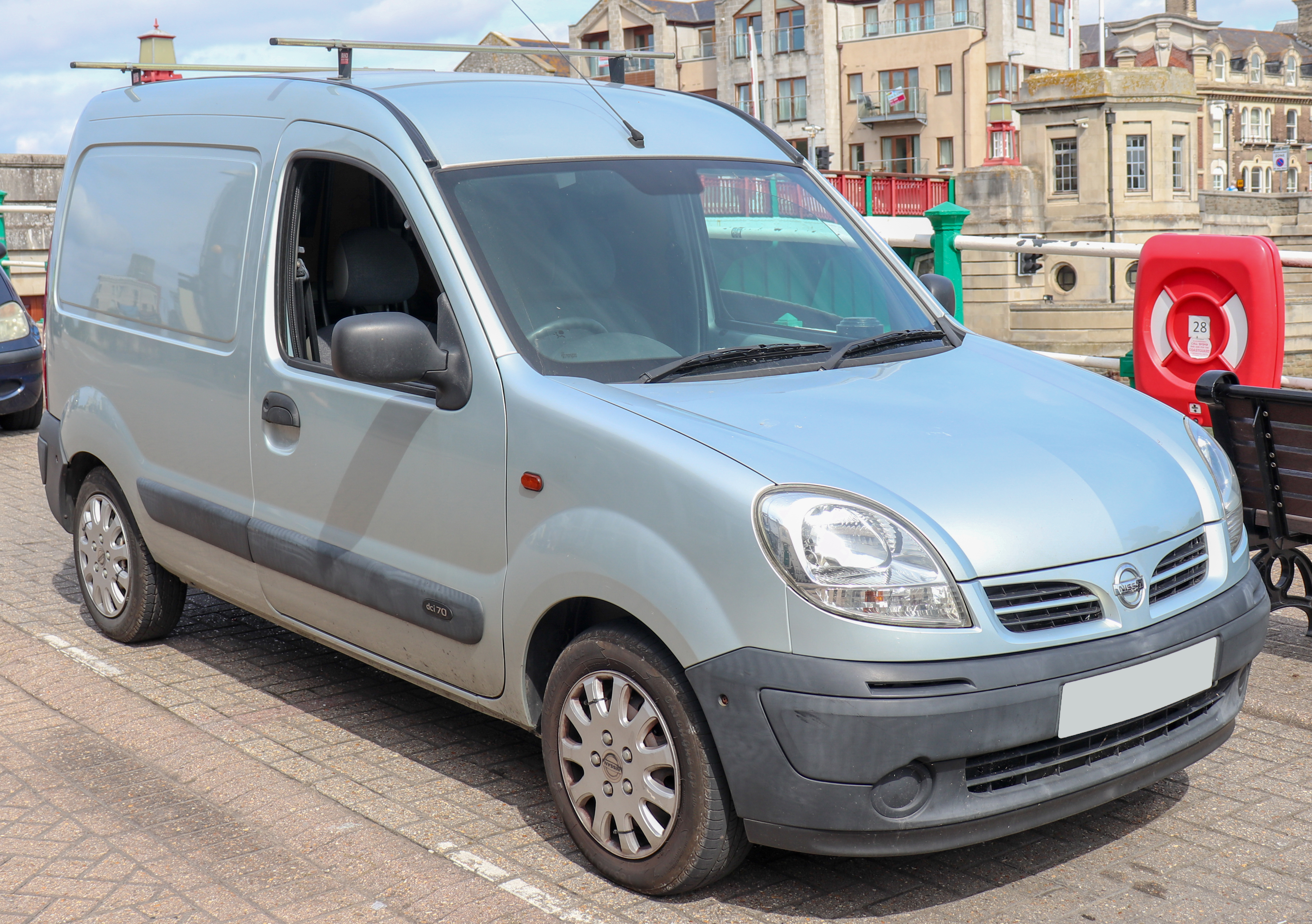
Front view

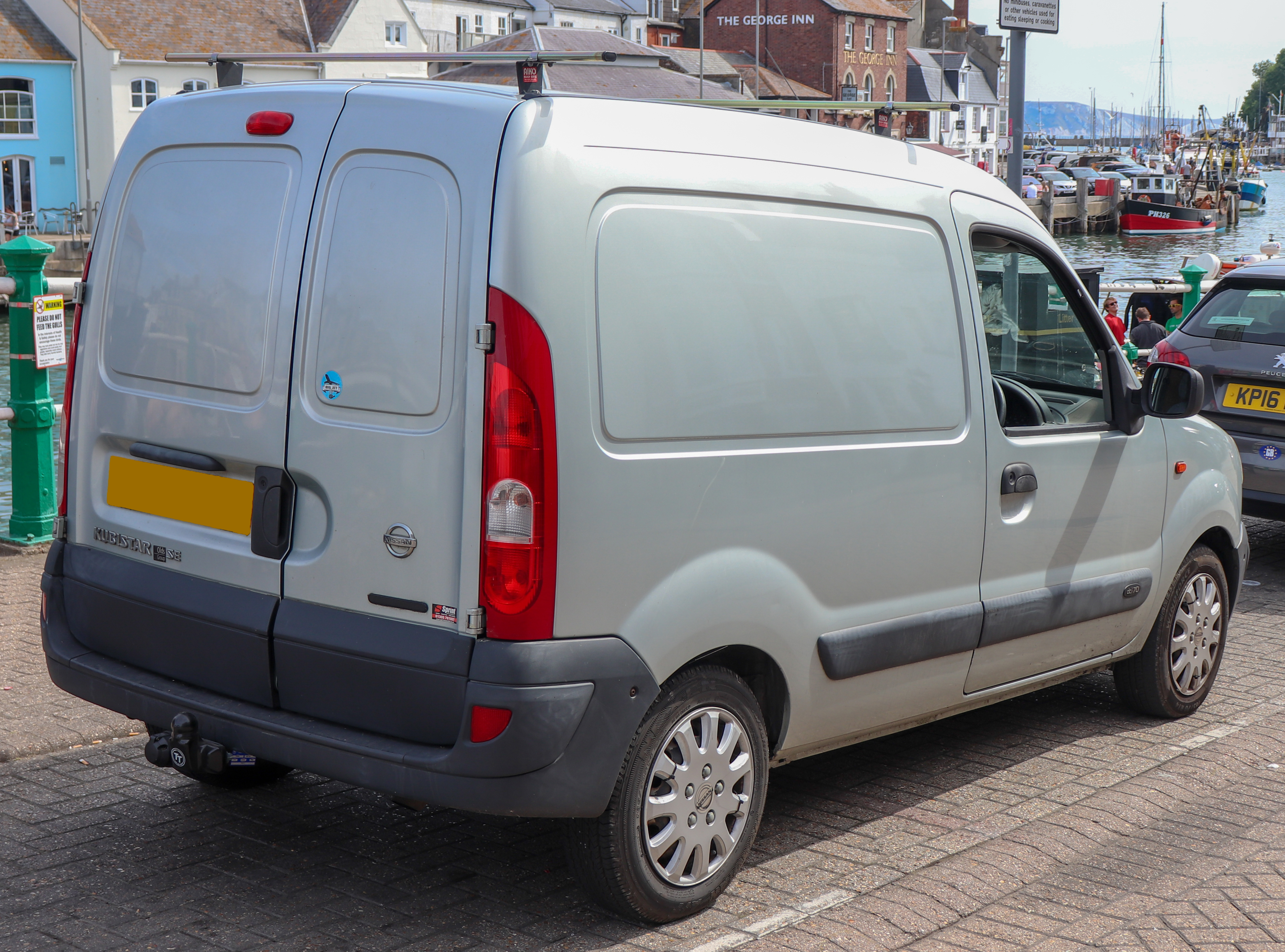
Rear view

=== Electric ===
Cleanova II is a hybrid electric drive train system, used in a vehicle based on Renault Kangoo, with two electric versions: full electric vehicle (FEV) and plug-in hybrid vehicle (PHEV).

== Second generation X61 (FW/KW; 2007) ==
Second generation
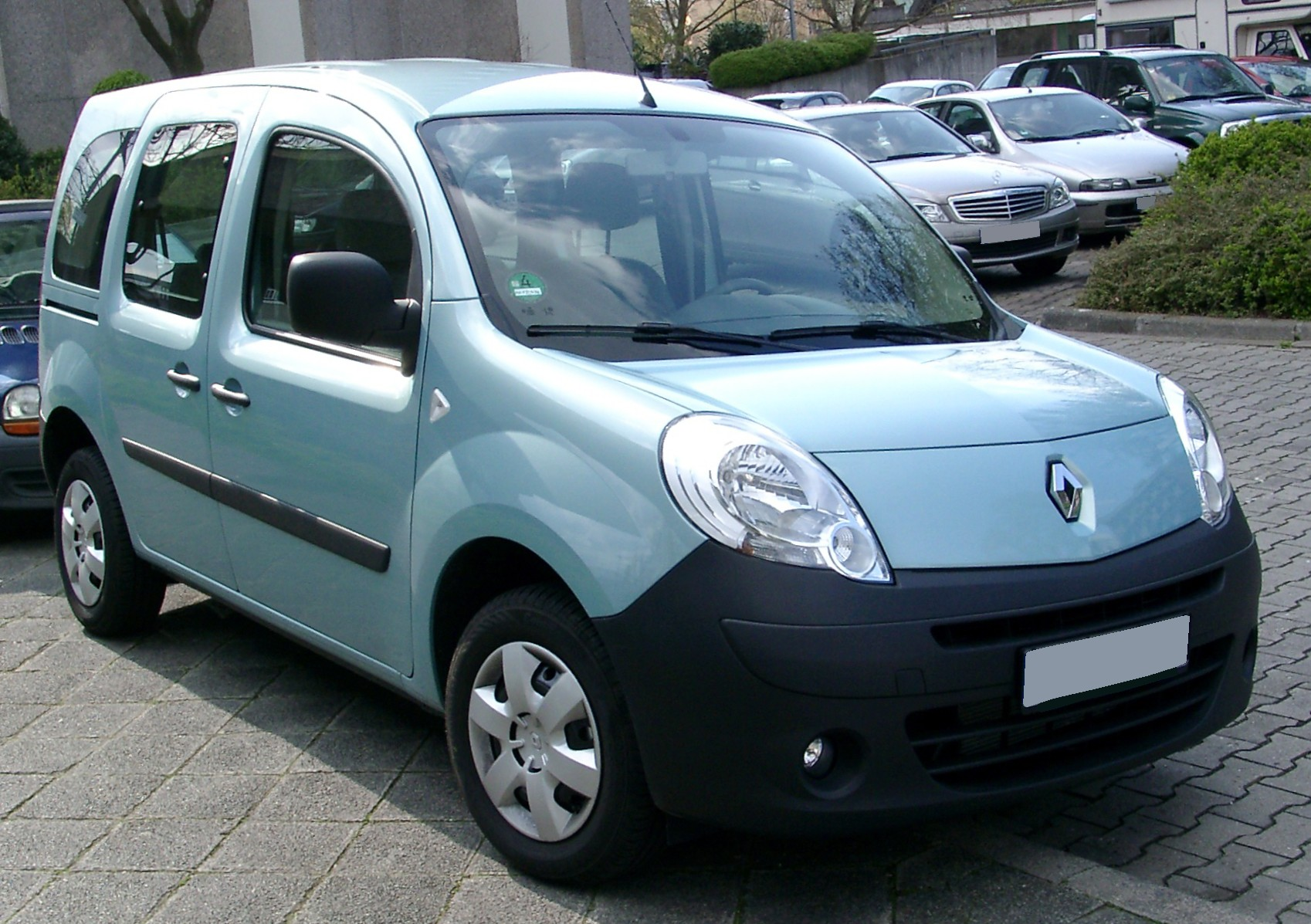

Overview
- Also called: Nissan NV250 (2019–2021); Mercedes-Benz Citan
- Production: 2007–2021
- Assembly: France: Maubeuge (MCA)
- Designer: Fabio Filippini

Body and chassis
- Body style: 3/5-door panel van 5-door LAV
- Platform: Renault–Nissan C platform
- Related: Renault Mégane II; Renault Scénic II

Powertrain
- Engine: Petrol: 1.2 L HRA2 (H5Ft) I4; 1.6 L K4M I4; Diesel: 1.5 L K9K I4

Dimensions
- Wheelbase: Compact: 2,313 mm (91.1 in); Express: 2,679 mm (105.5 in); Maxi: 3,081 mm (121.3 in)
- Length: Compact: 3,898 mm (153.5 in); Express: 4,213 mm (165.9 in); Maxi: 4,666 mm (183.7 in)
- Width: 1,829 mm (72.0 in)
- Height: Compact: 1,812 mm (71.3 in); Express: 1,844 mm (72.6 in); Maxi: 1,836 mm (72.3 in)

Chronology
- Predecessor: Nissan NV200/Evalia (for NV250)

The second-generation Kangoo are based on the Scénic and manufactured in Maubeuge. Sales began in May 2007. A seven-seat version, which is longer by 40 cm, became available from July 2012.

They are also sold by Mercedes-Benz as the Mercedes-Benz Citan, with a revised front design, being launched in September 2012. In February 2012, Renault retired the Kangoo MPV, Espace, Laguna, Modus, and Wind lines in the United Kingdom.

A facelifted version of both the van and the passenger versions was available from the beginning of 2013.

In November 2018, it was announced that Nissan would rebadge the Kangoo, turning it into the NV250. The Nissan NV250 launched in December 2019 and was available in the United Kingdom.

=== Body styles ===
The Kangoo is available in three wheelbase configurations: the Kangoo Express, the Kangoo Compact with a shorter wheelbase, and the Kangoo Express Maxi with a longer wheelbase – all three offered in passenger variants. The short wheelbase version was sold as the Kangoo Be Bop between 2009 and 2012.

The payload of the Kangoo Express and Express Maxi is between 650 and 825 kg (1,433 and 1,819 lb) depending on version and market, while the short wheelbase Kangoo Compact has a reduced payload of 500 kg (1,102 lb). The Kangoo Express Maxi has up to 2.90 m (9.5 ft) of usable floor length.

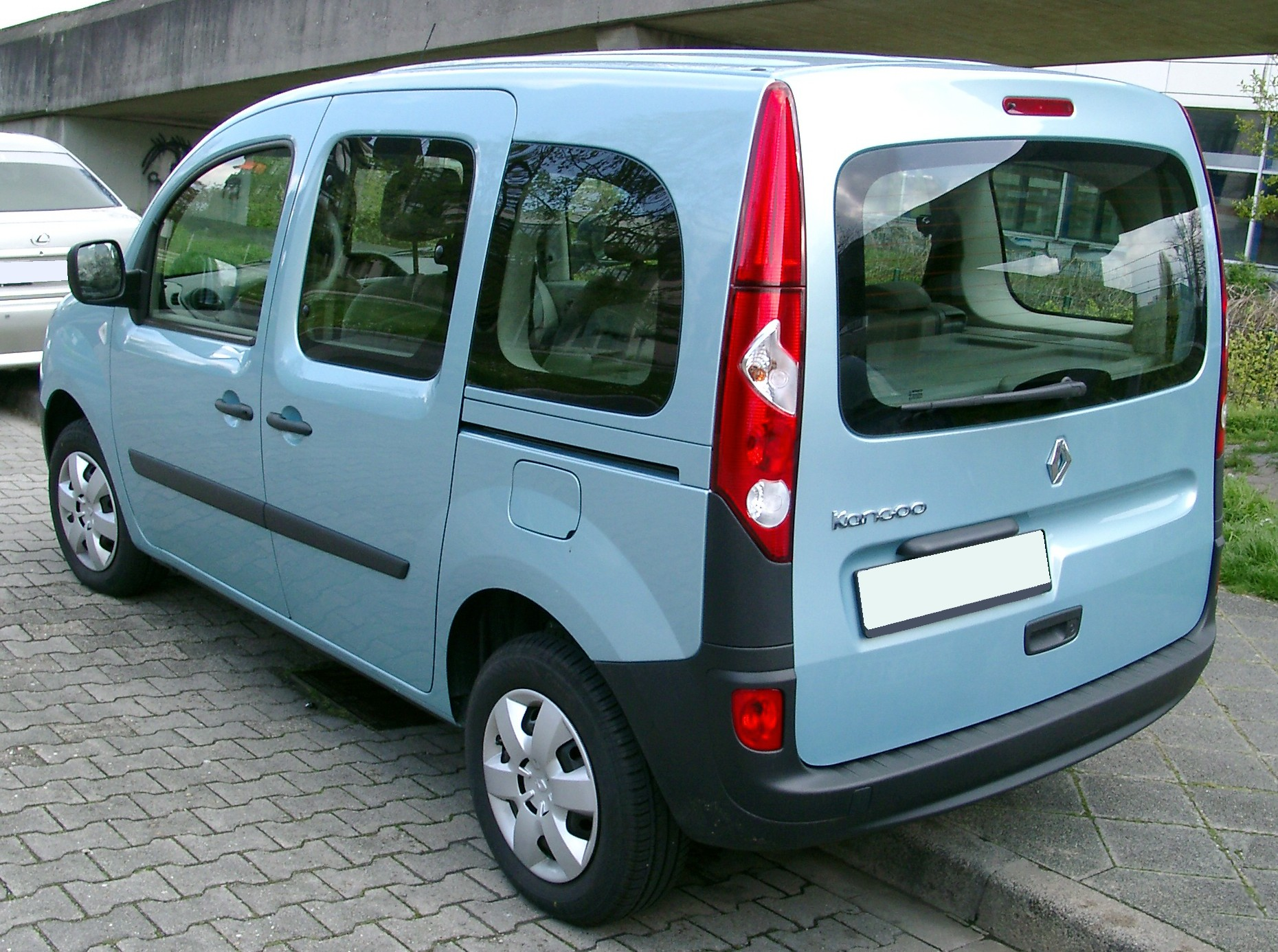
Rear view

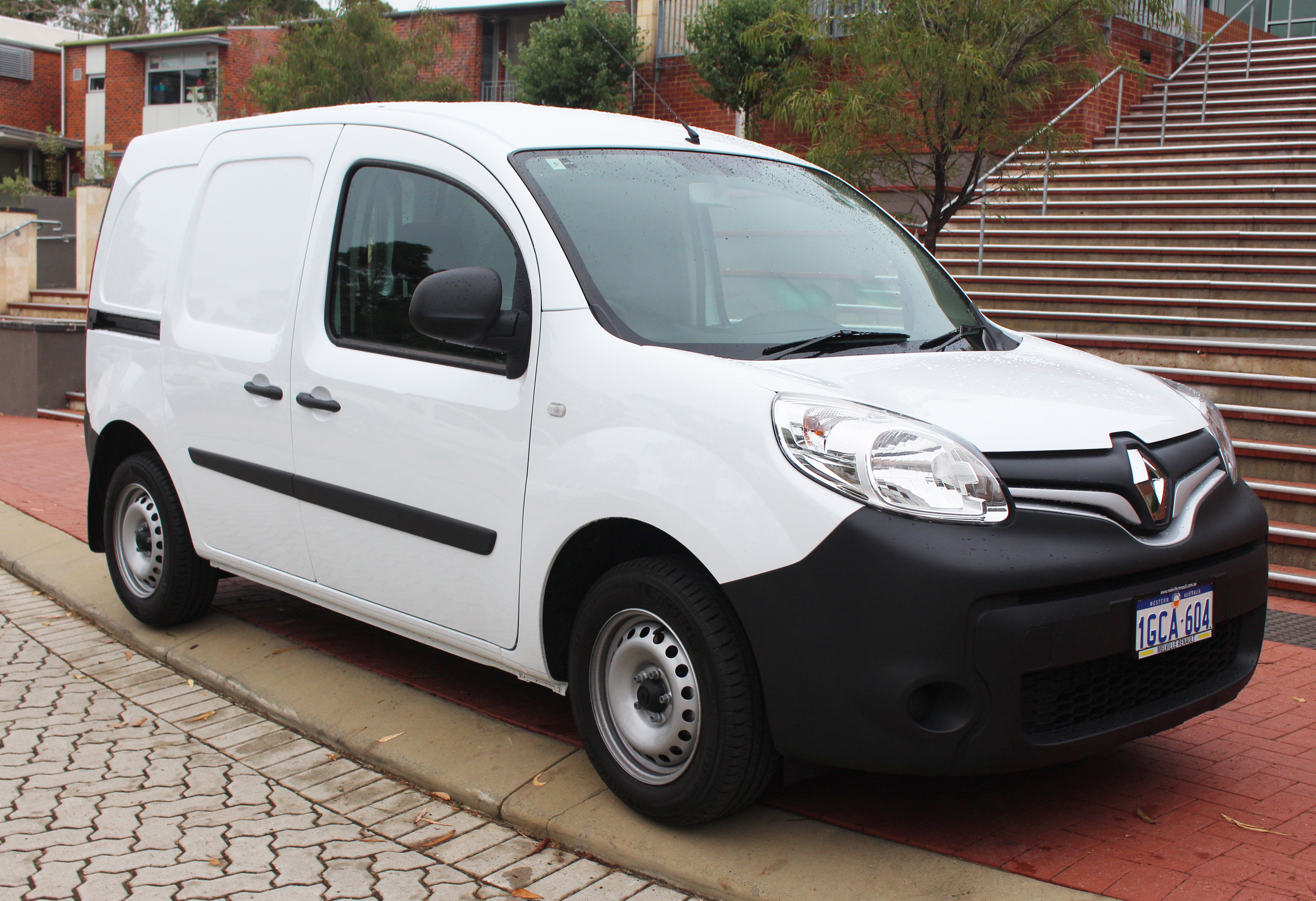
Renault Kangoo (facelift)

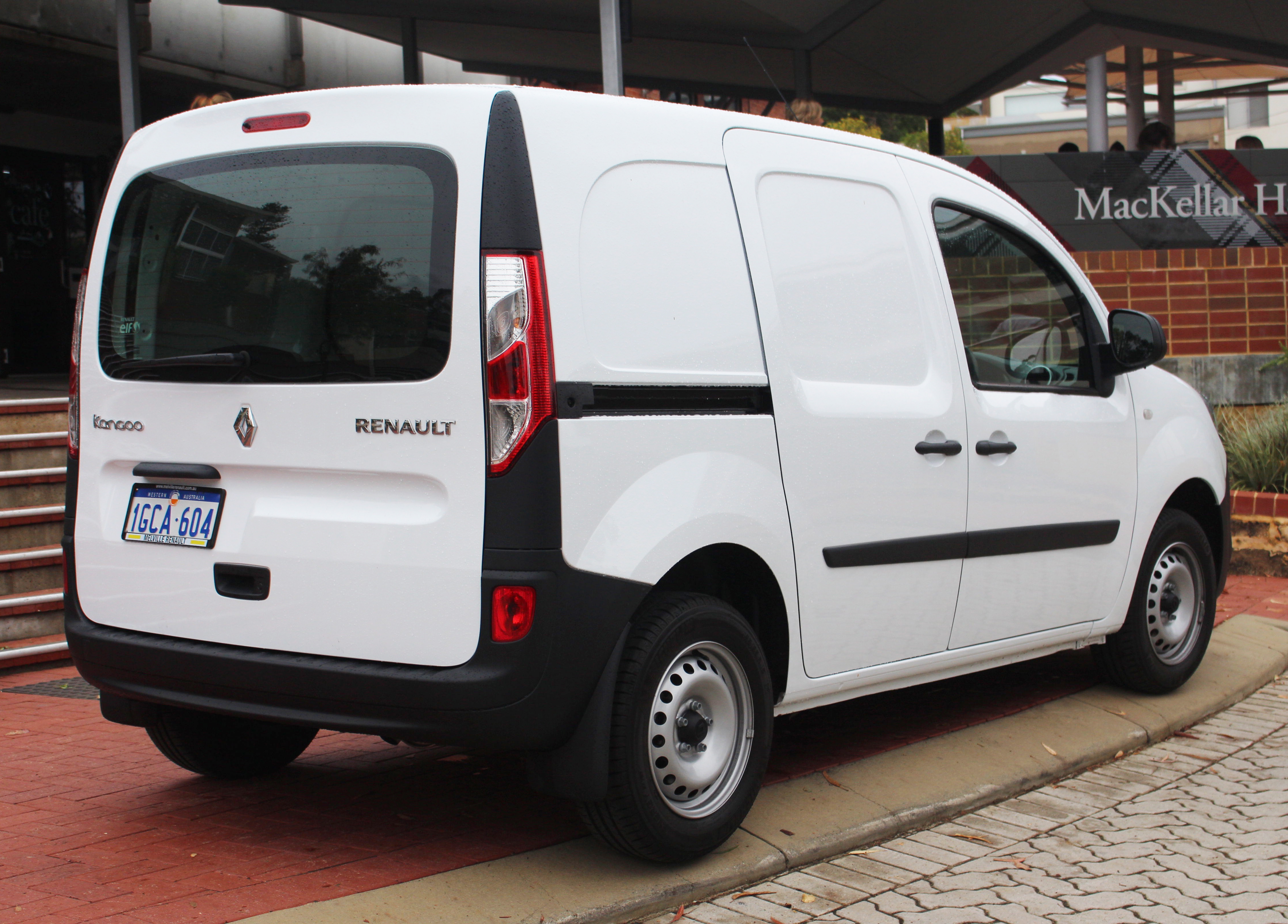
Renault Kangoo (facelift)

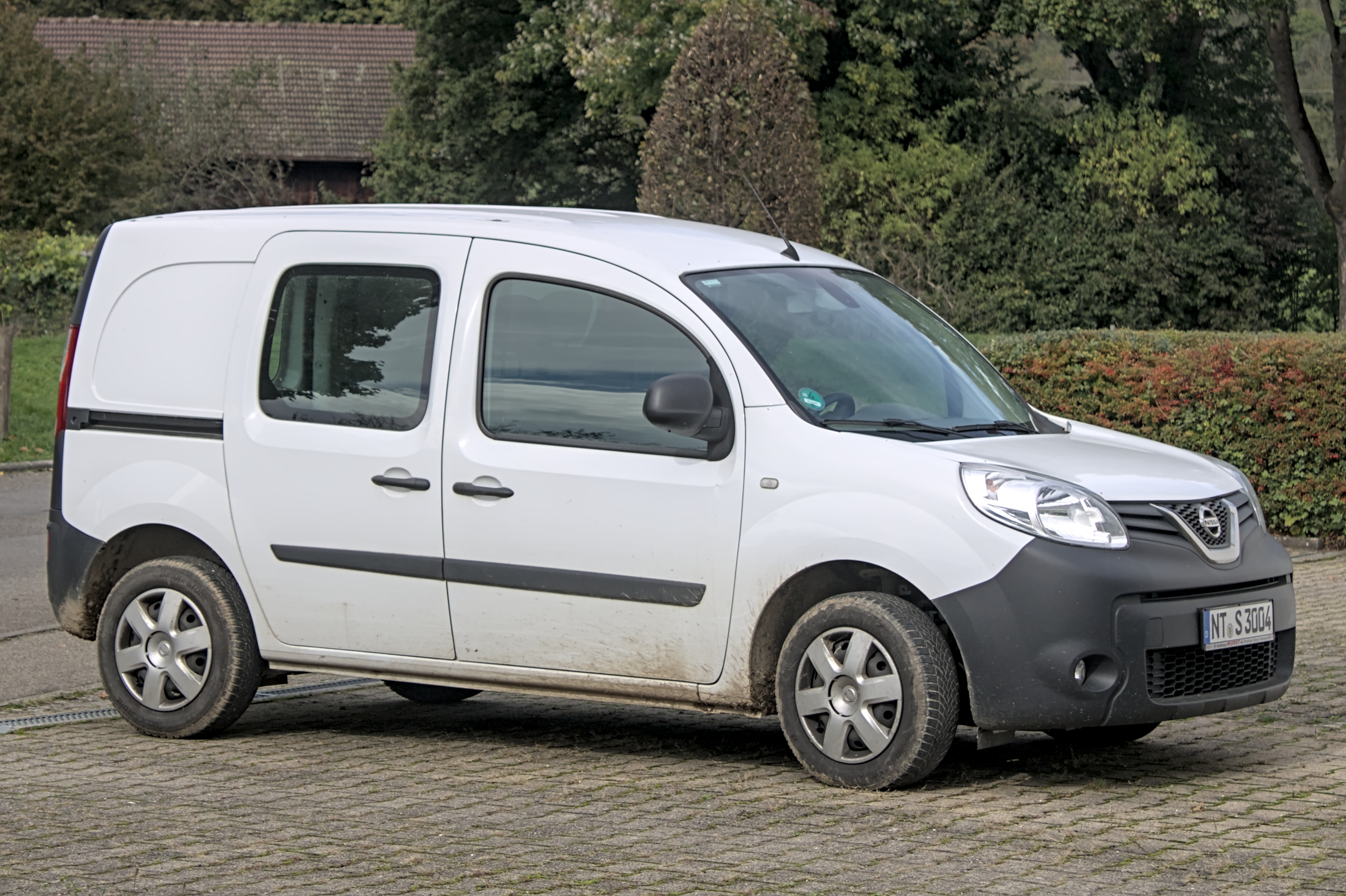
Nissan NV250

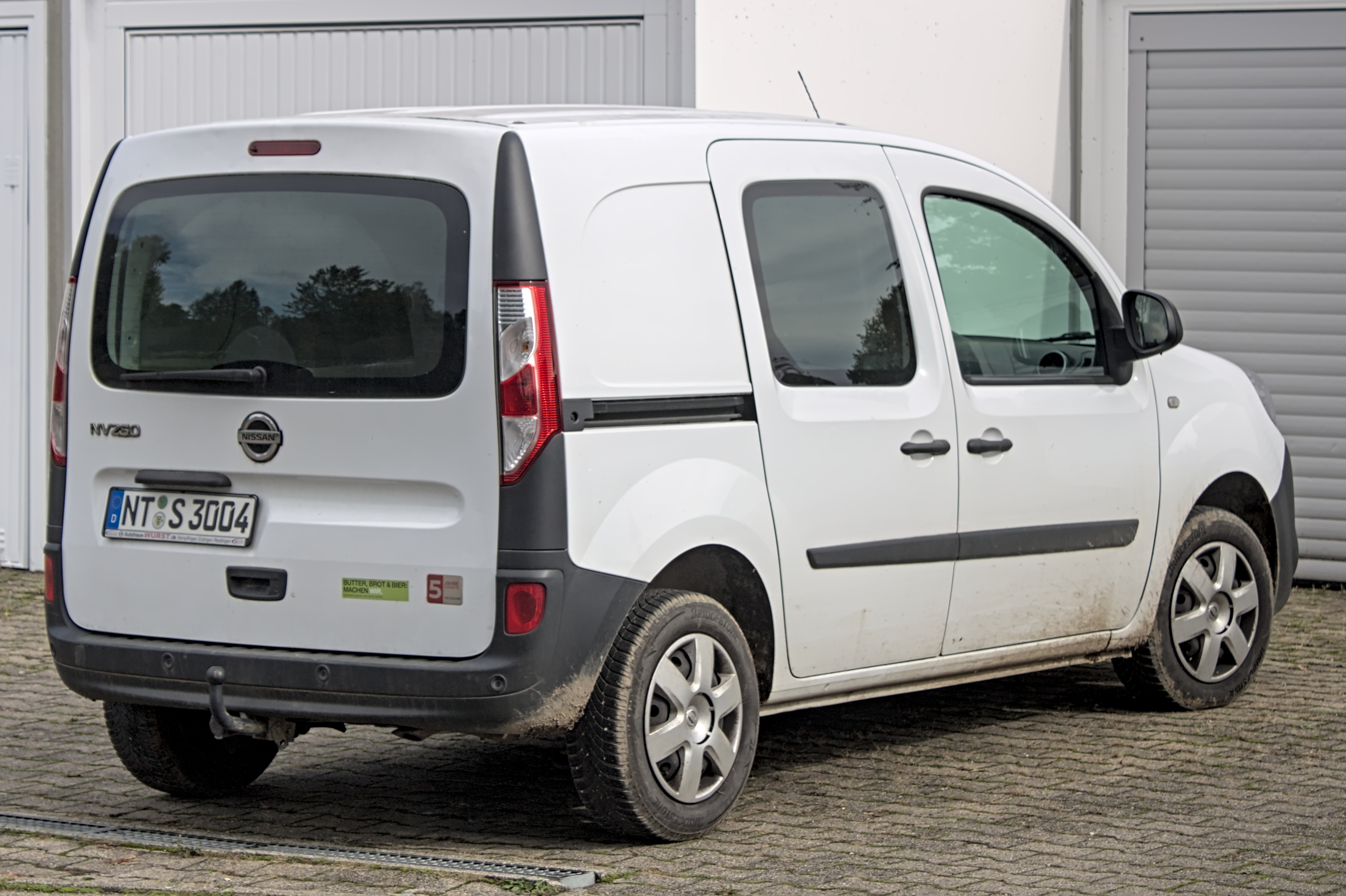
Rear view

Following the 2007 Renault Kangoo Compact Concept, the Renault Kangoo Be Bop was presented at 2008 Paris Motor Show. This 3,870 mm (152 in) long model, with only three doors, is equipped with a sliding glass roof at the rear, 4 seats and a two-tone body. Judged expensive and unpractical, the Kangoo Be Bop was a commercial failure, and only 1,400 units were produced between 2009 and 2011.

A 7-seater version of the Kangoo, named Grand Kangoo, has been on the market since July 2012.

==== Gallery ====
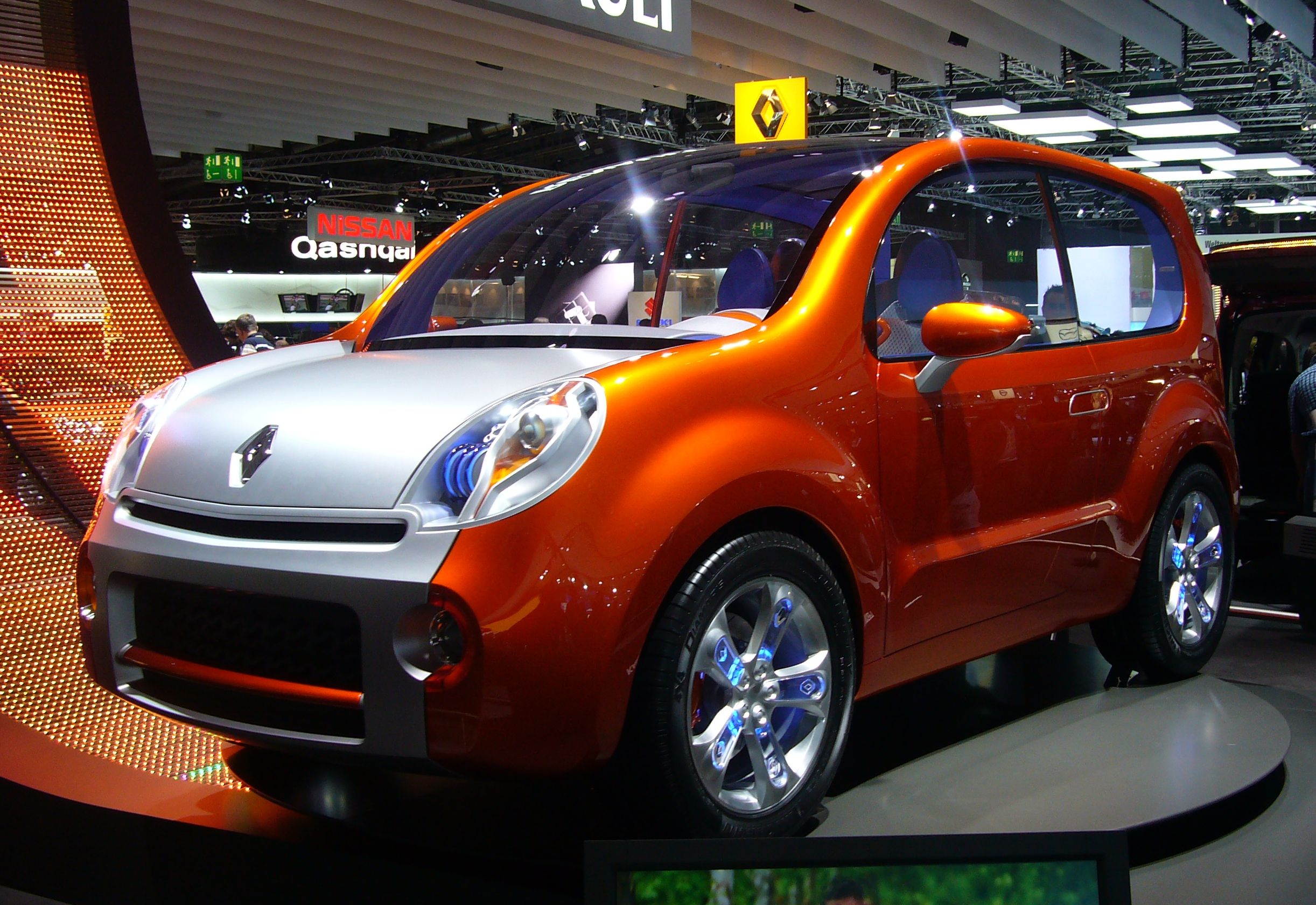
Kangoo Compact Concept

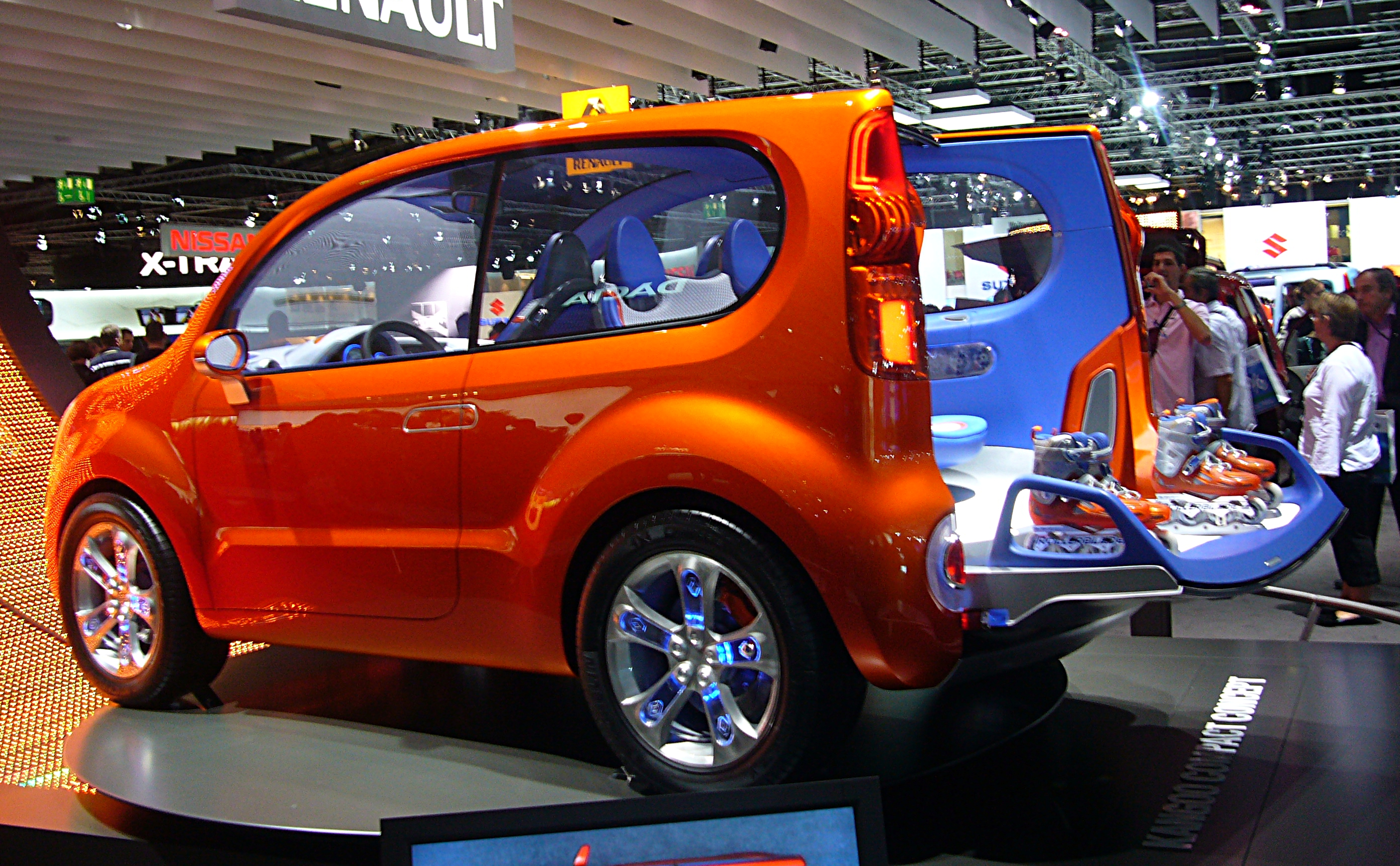
Kangoo Compact Concept (rear)

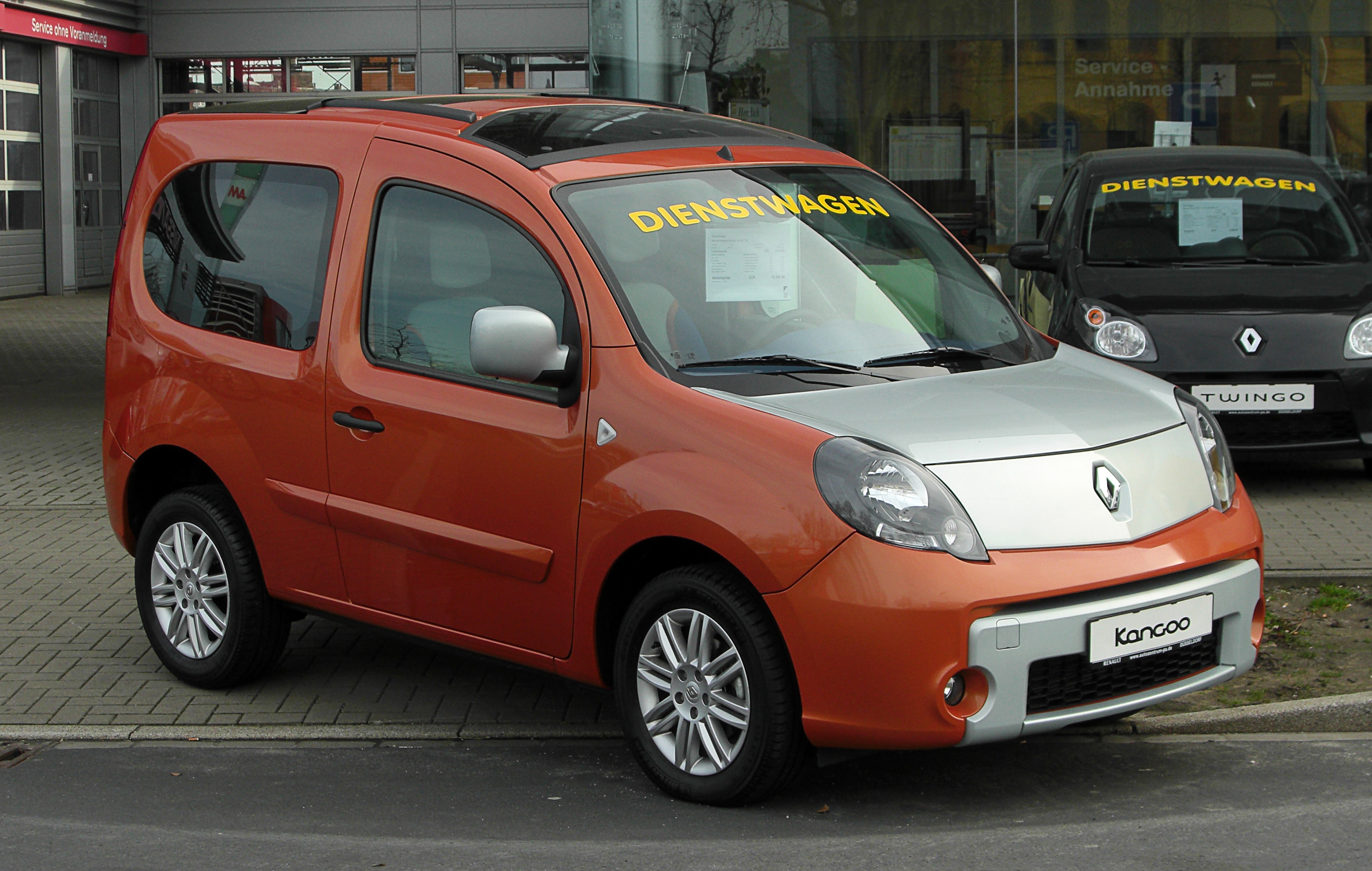
Kangoo Be Bop

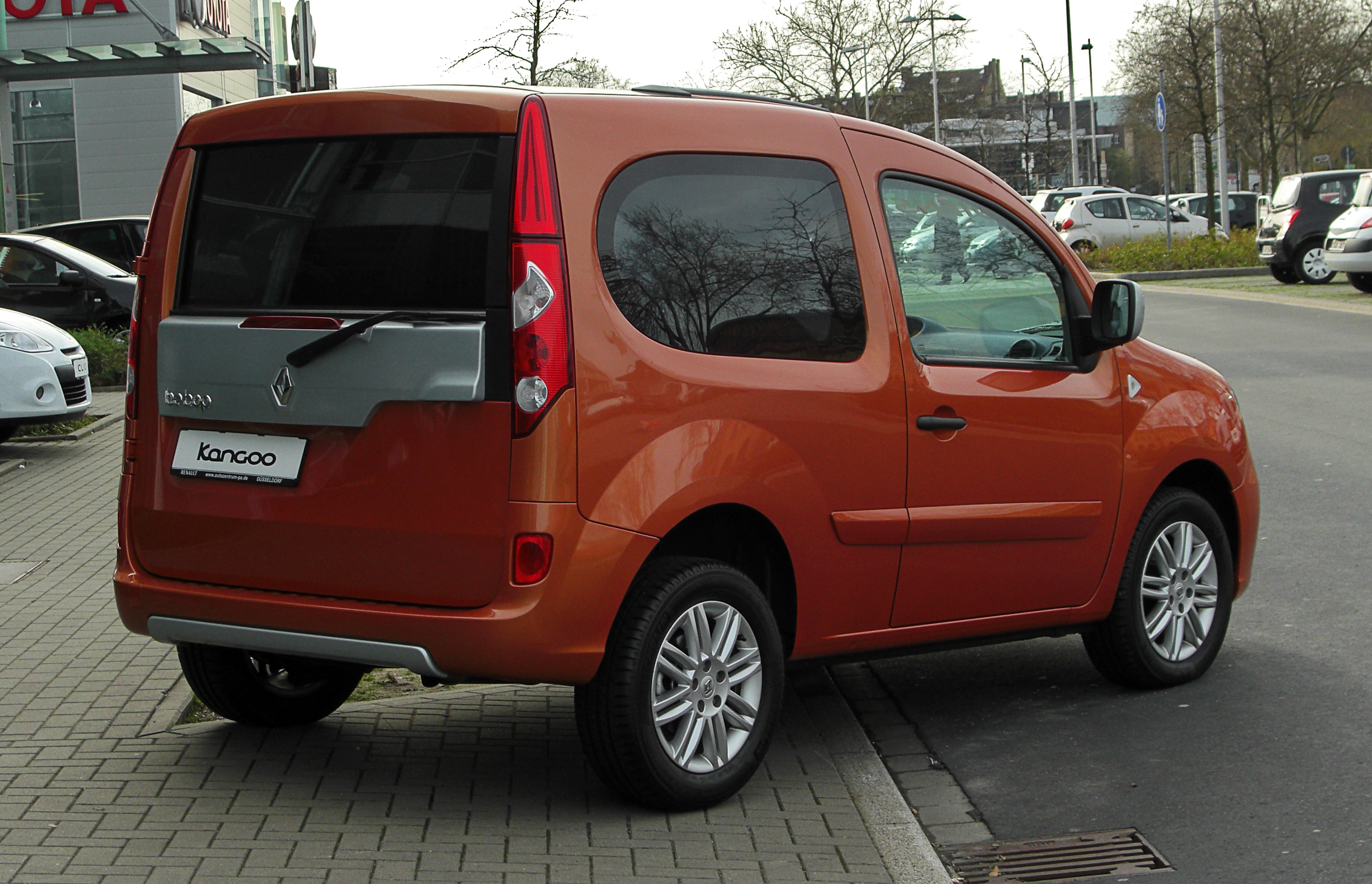
Kangoo Be Bop (rear)

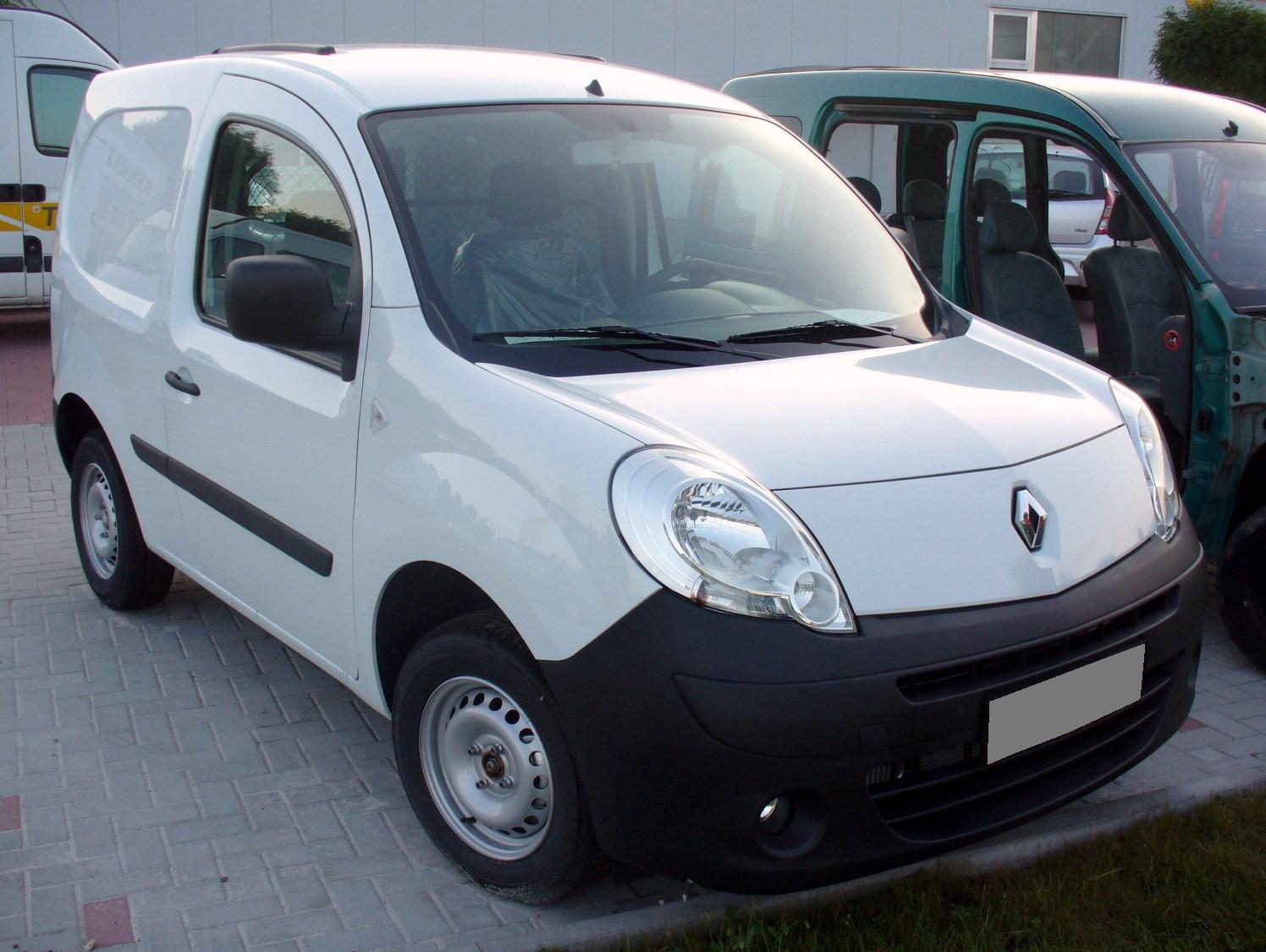
Kangoo Express Compact

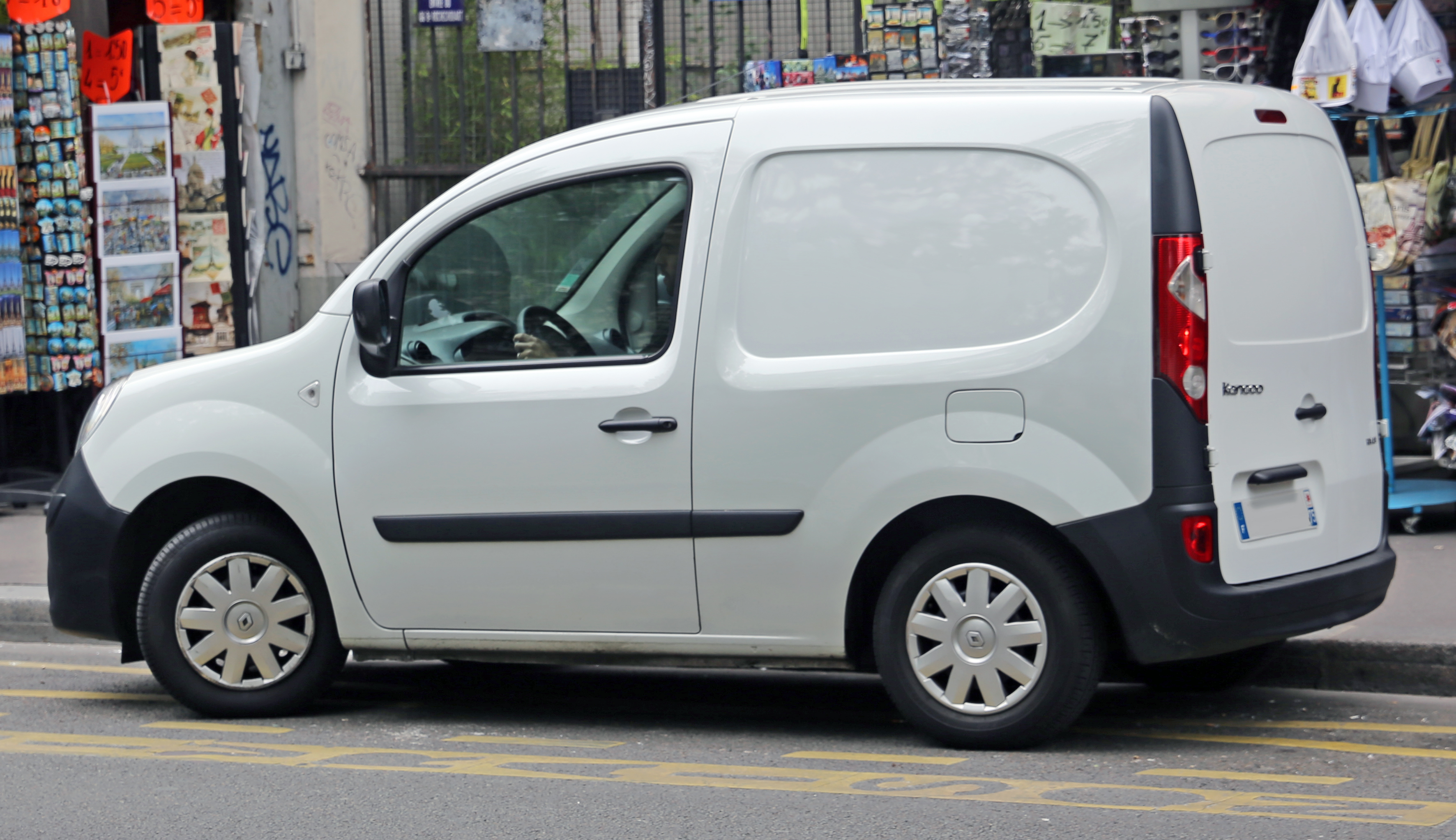
Kangoo Express Compact (rear)

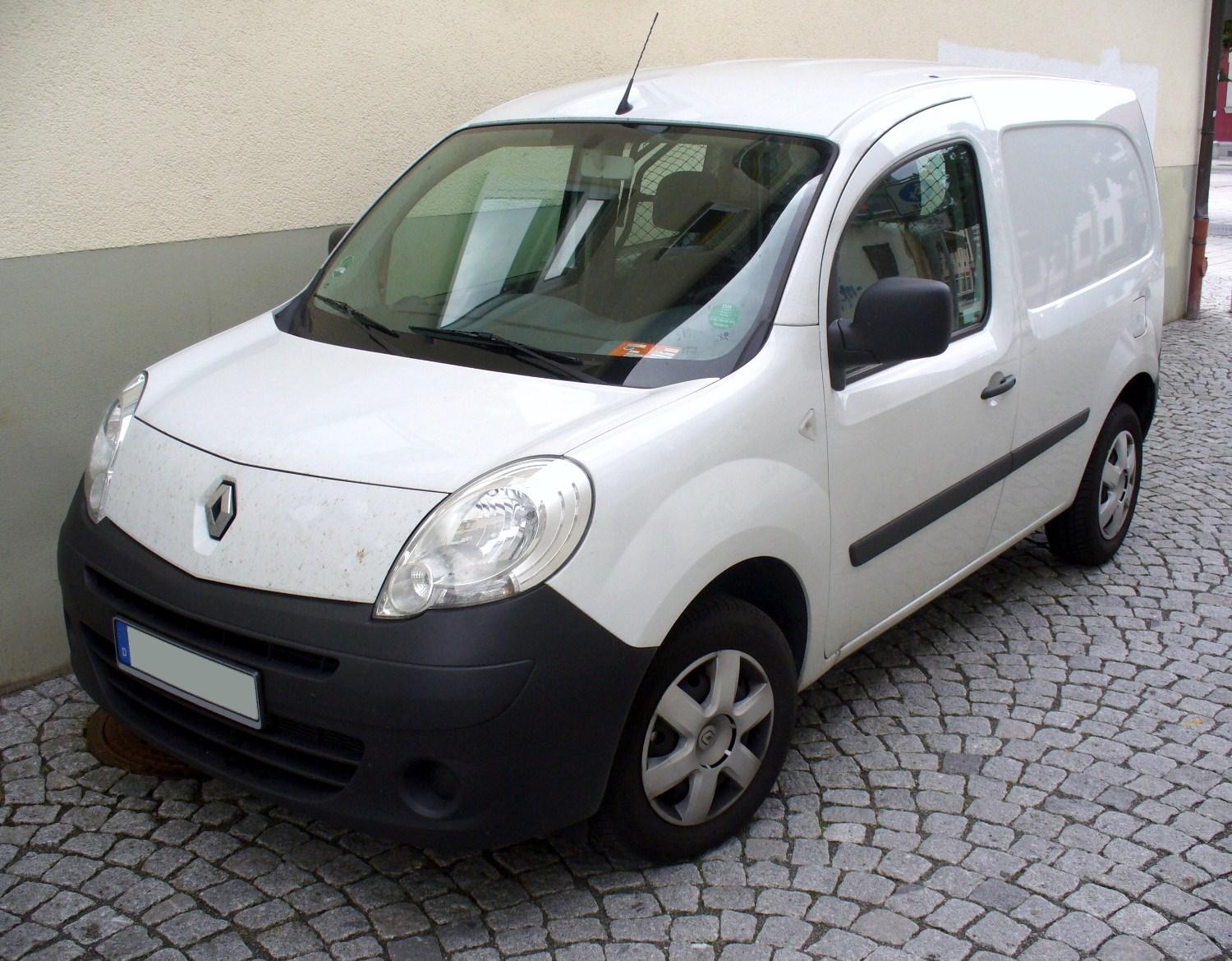
Kangoo Express

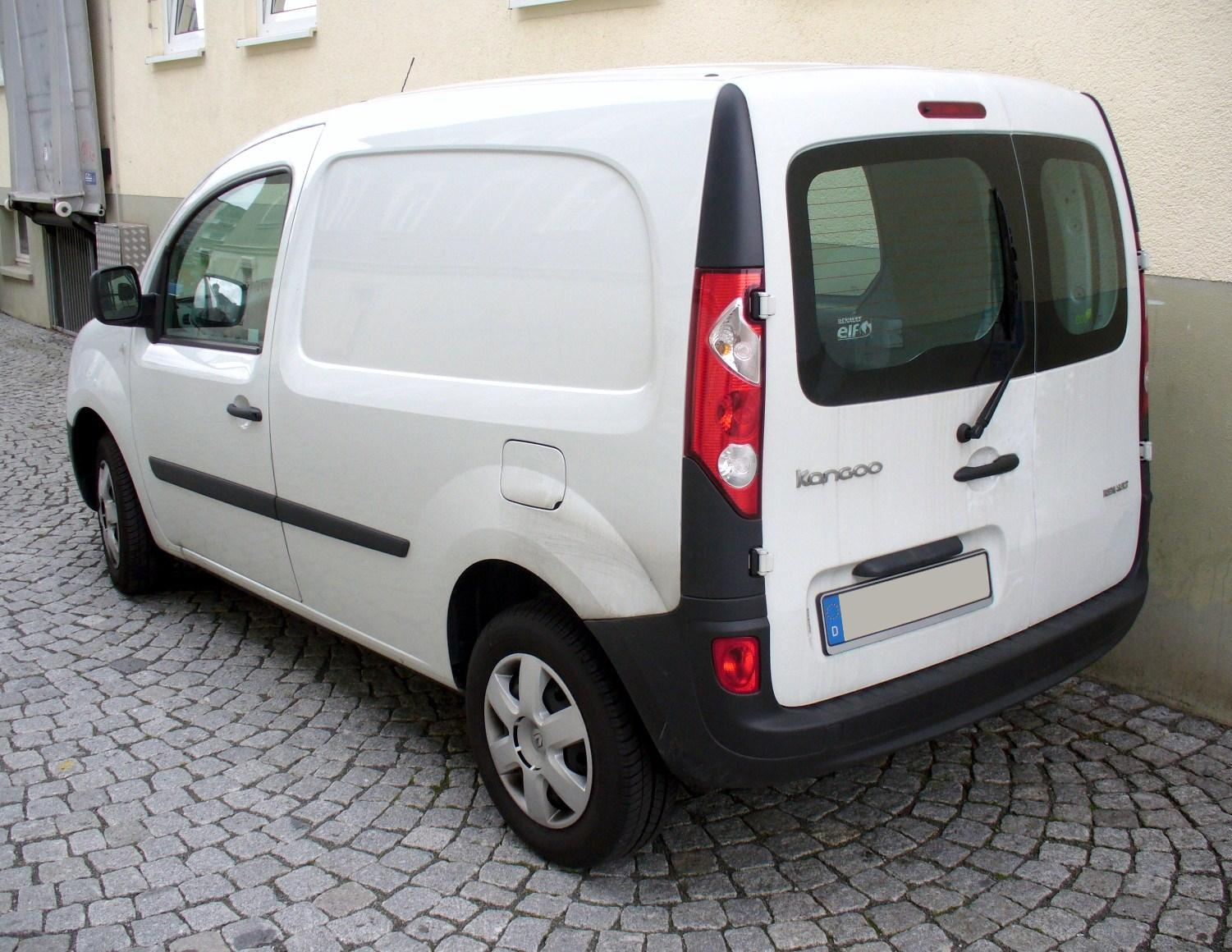
Kangoo Express (rear)

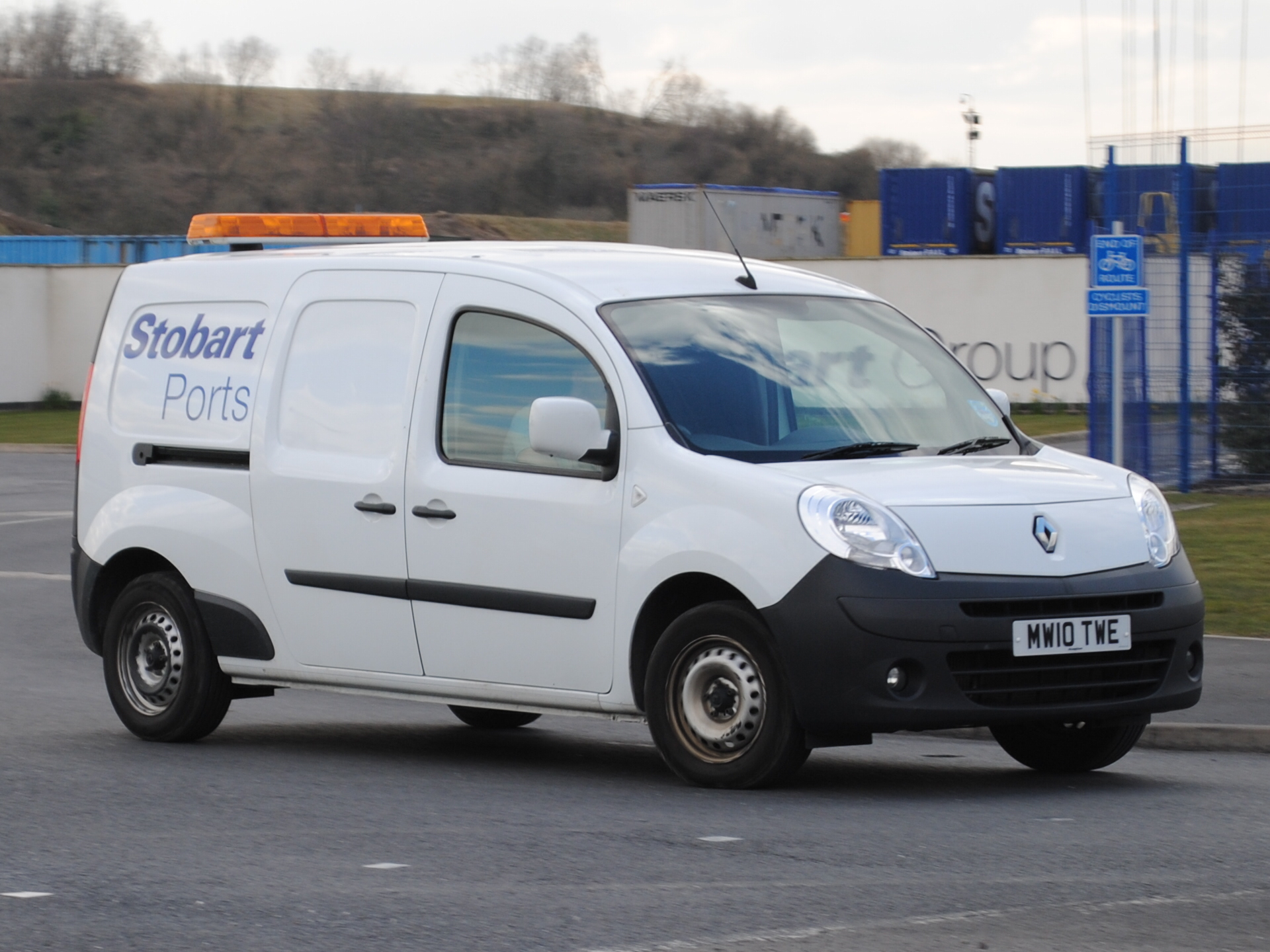
Kangoo Express Maxi

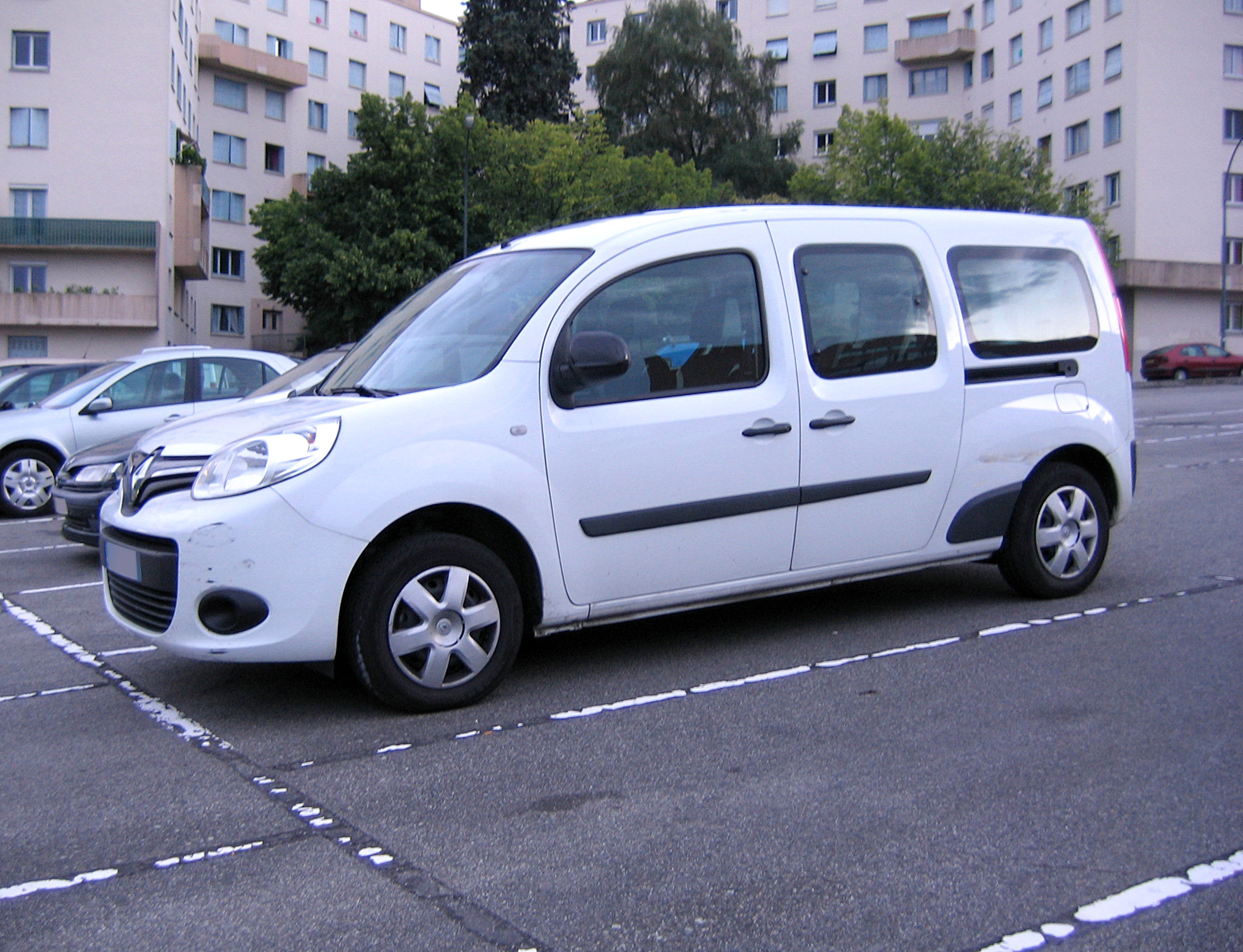
Grand Kangoo

=== Engines ===
Benziner
Model	Type	Displacement	Power at rpm	Top speed	Acc. 0–100 km/h	Production period
1.2 16V TCe	H5Ft	1197 cc	84 kW (114 PS) at 4500	170 km/h	14.0 s	03/2013–07/2015
1.2 16V TCe	H5Ft	1197 cc	85 kW (115 PS) at 4500	173 km/h	11.7 s	08/2015–08/2018
1.6 8V	K4M	1598 cc	64 kW (87 PS) at 5500	158 km/h	15.8 s	01/2008–06/2011
1.6 16V	K4M	1598 cc	78 kW (106 PS) at 5750	170 km/h	13.0 s	02/2008–12/2014
Diesel
1.5 dCi	K9K	1461 cc	50 kW (68 PS) at 4,000	146 km/h	19.6 s	01/2008–08/2010
1.5 dCi	K9K	1461 cc	55 kW (75 PS) at 4000	150 km/h	16.3 s	09/2010–08/2018
1.5 dCi	K9K	1461 cc	63 kW (86 PS) at 3750	159 km/h	16.0 s	01/2008–08/2010
1.5 dCi	K9K	1461 cc	66 kW (90 PS) at 4000	160 km/h	14.6 s	09/2010–08/2018
1.5 dCi	K9K	1461 cc	76 kW (103 PS) at 4000	170 km/h	13.2 s	01/2008–08/2010
1.5 dCi	K9K	1461 cc	81 kW (110 PS) at 4000	170 km/h	12.3 s	09/2010–08/2018
Blue dCi 80	K9K	1461 cc	59 kW (80 PS) at 3750	152 km/h	16.8 s	03/2019–04/2021
Blue dCi 95	K9K	1461 cc	70 kW (95 PS) at 3750	161 km/h	13.8 s	03/2019–04/2021
Blue dCi 115	K9K	1461 cc	85 kW (115 PS) at 3750	172 km/h	11.2 s	03/2019–04/2021

=== Kangoo Z.E. ===
Kangoo II Z.E. / E.Tech electric
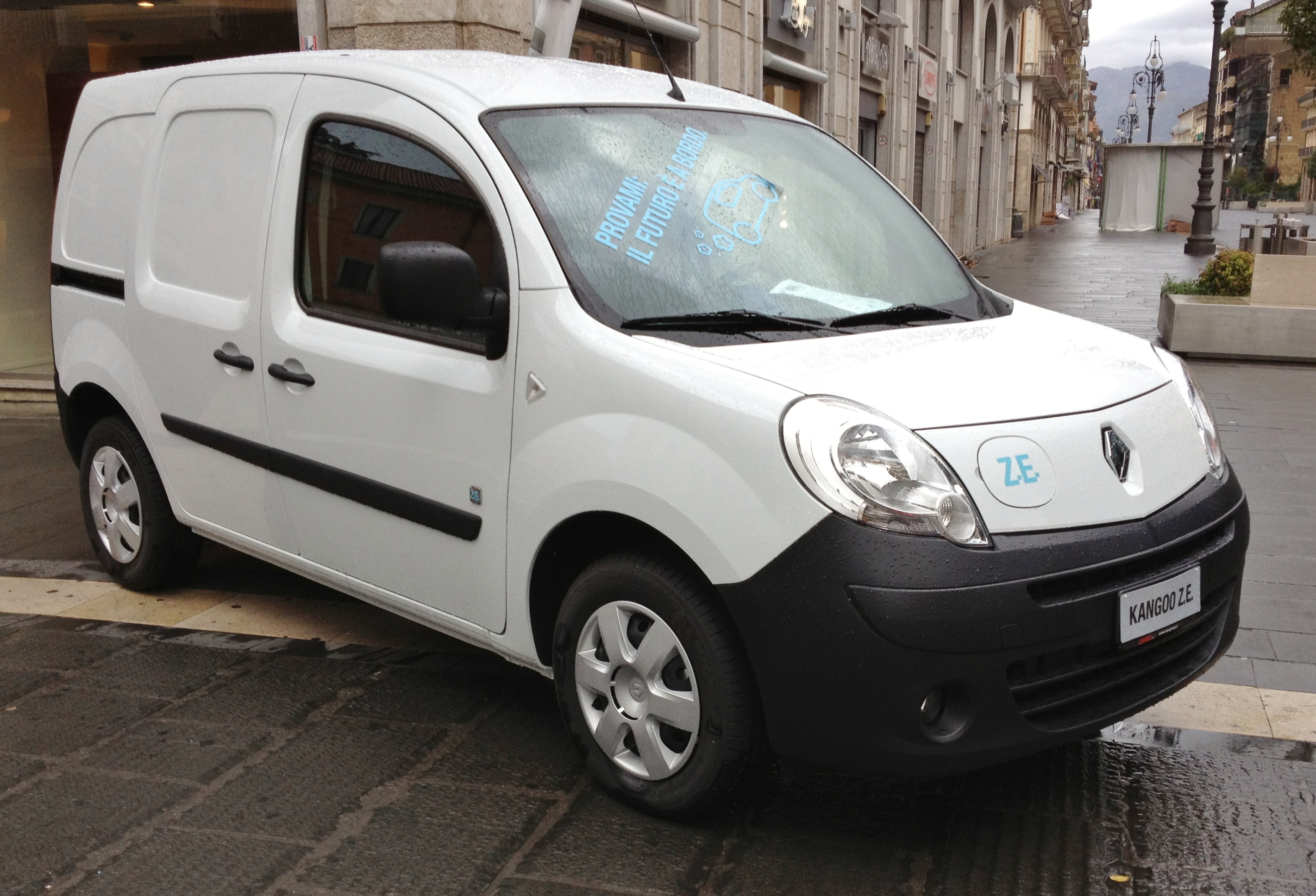

Overview
- Production: 2011–2021
- Assembly: France: Maubeuge (MCA)

Body and chassis
- Class: Electric van
- Body style: 3/4/5-door panel van 4/5-door van

Powertrain
- Electric motor: 44 kW (59 hp), 226 N⋅m (167 lb⋅ft) AC synchronous motor
- Battery: 22 kWh lithium ion battery 33 kWh (Z.E. 33/Power+)
- Range: 170 km (110 mi) NEDC; 270 km (170 mi) NEDC (33 kWh)

Dimensions
- Wheelbase: 2,697 mm (106.2 in); 3,081 mm (121.3 in) (Maxi)
- Length: 4,282 mm (168.6 in); 4,666 mm (183.7 in) (Maxi)
- Curb weight: 1,410 kg (3,110 lb); 1,505 kg (3,318 lb) (33 kWh); 1,585-1,631 kg (33 kWh Maxi)

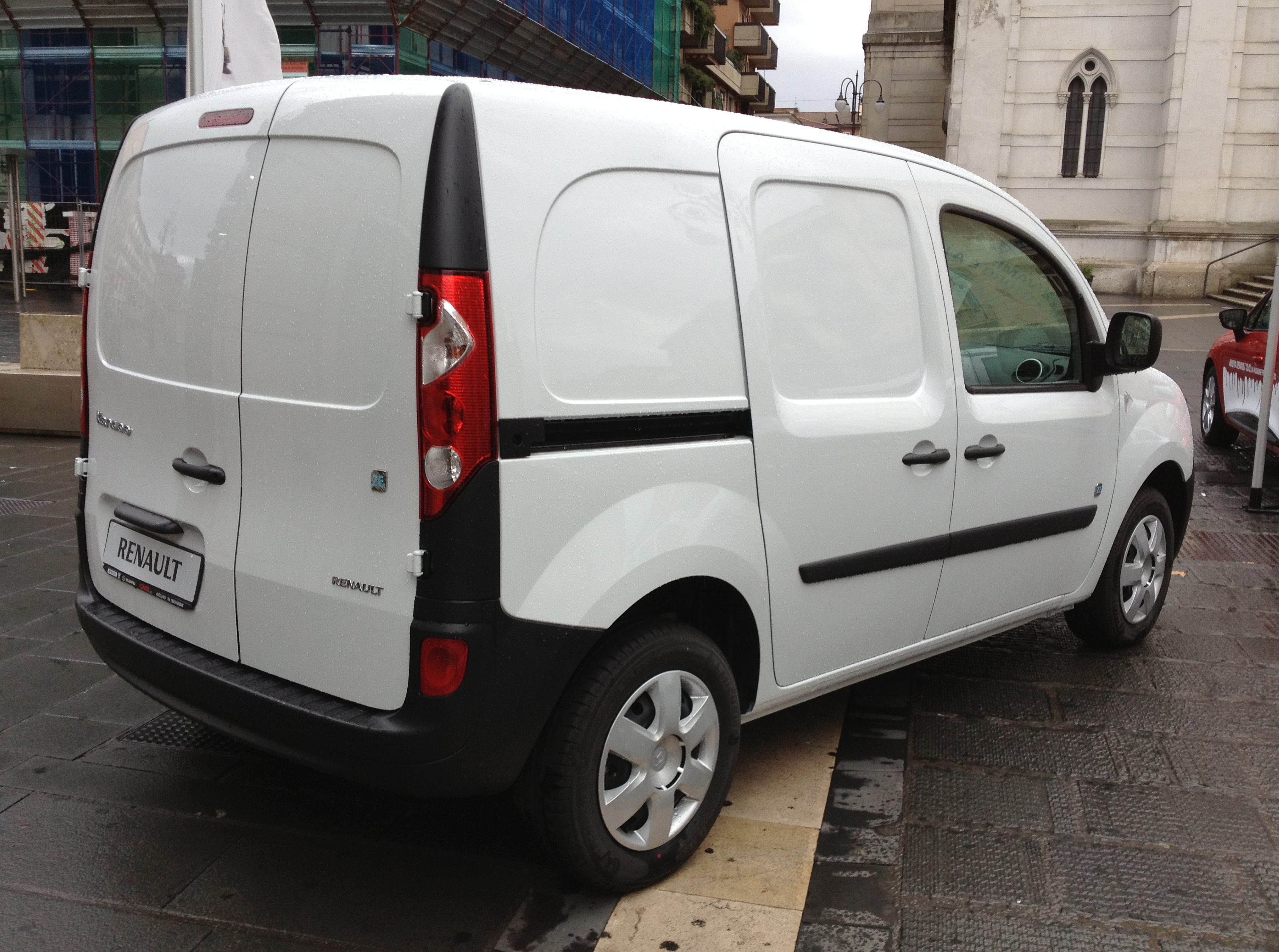
Renault Kangoo Z.E. (rear)

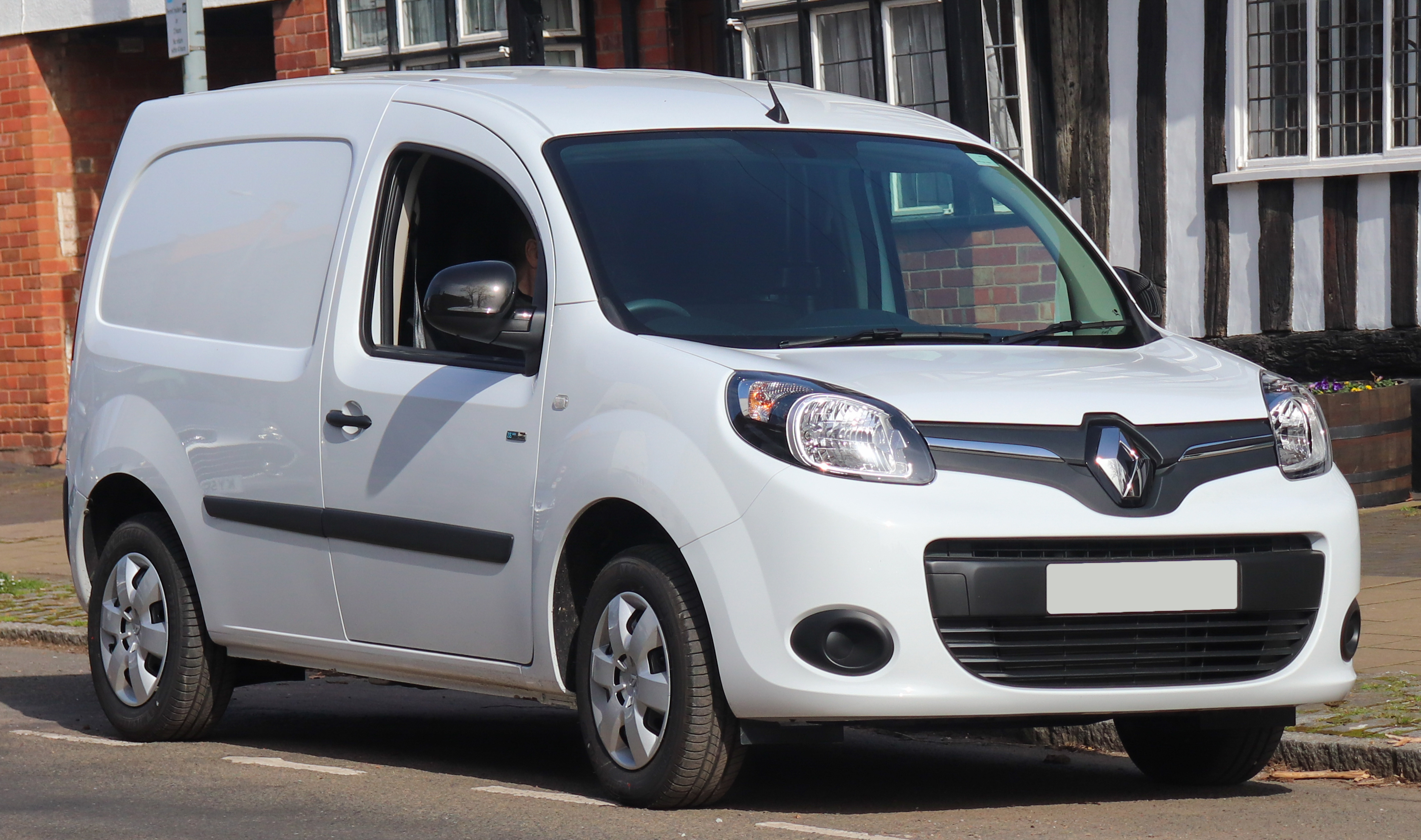

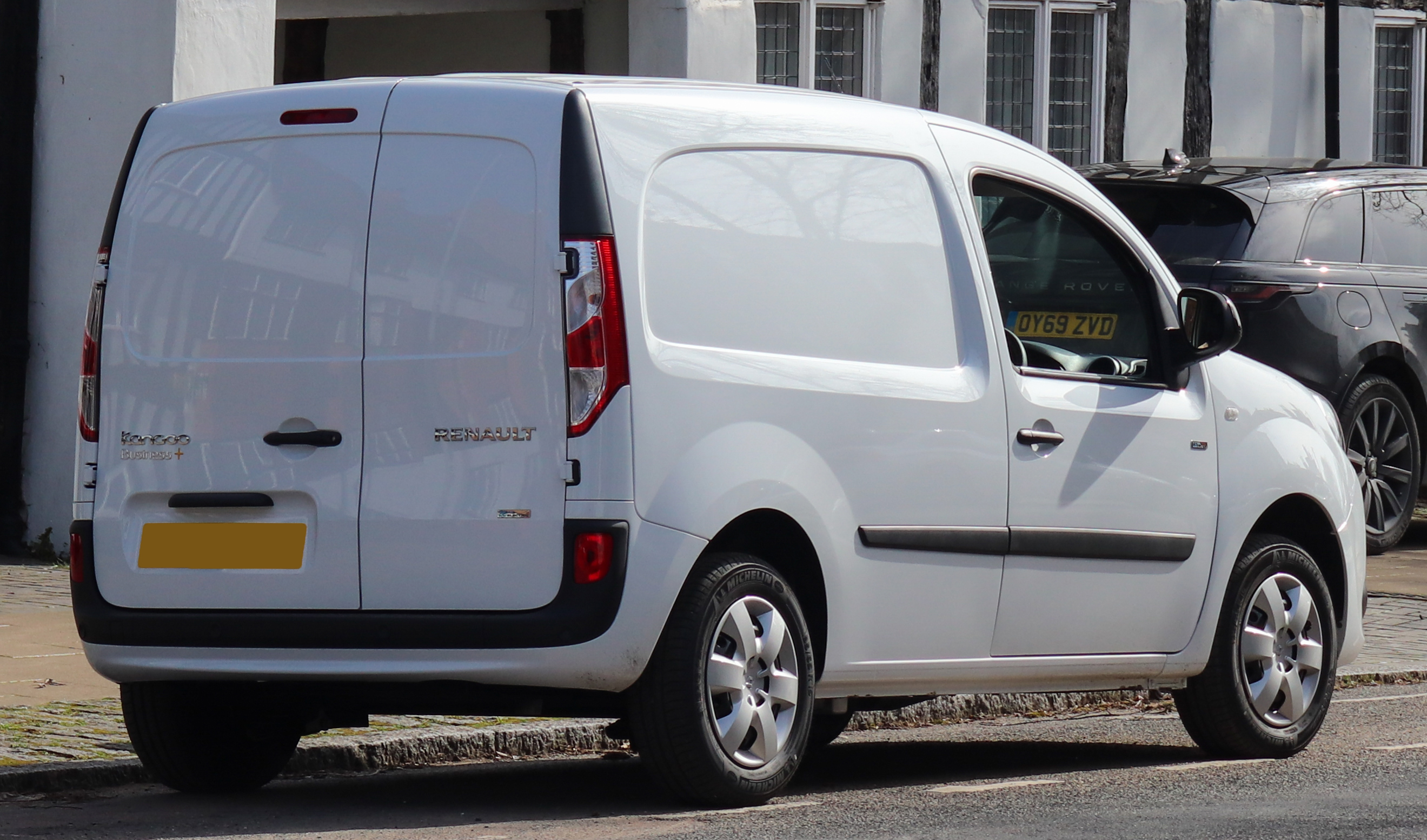
Z.E. facelift

History

As part of its Z.E. electric car initiative, Renault has developed the Kangoo Z.E. model that is manufactured at its Maubeuge plant. A prototype was shown at the September 2010 International Commercial Vehicles Show in Hanover, Germany, and the electric van was released for retail sales in October 2011. In November 2011, the Kangoo Z.E. was voted International Van of the Year for 2012. It was also elected Electric Vehicle of the Year in 2012 and 2013 by GreenFleet.

It was introduced to Mexico on 15 October 2020. In 2021, the next-generation electric Kangoo was introduced as the Kangoo E-Tech electric, based on the Renault–Nissan CMF-C/D platform.

Sales

A total of 3,652 Kangoo Z.E. utility vans were registered in France through December 2012, and, with 2,869 units delivered in 2012, the electric van became the top selling plug-in electric vehicle in the country. During 2011, the Kangoo Z.E. sold 991 units in Europe, and cumulative sales in the region reached 6,658 units sold in the region through December 2012, with global sales of 6,665 units.

Worldwide cumulative sales passed the 10,000 mark by the start of September 2013, representing about 10% of overall Kangoo van global sales. The Kangoo Z.E. is the leader of the small all electric van segment, and the best selling electric vehicle in France, with 9,125 units registered through June 2014. The vehicle was updated in 2017.

The Kangoo Z.E. is Europe's top-selling all-electric light commercial vehicle, with global sales of 48,821 units since its inception through December 2019.

Drivetrain

The Kangoo Z.E. has the same dimensions as the internal combustion model. It uses a synchronous electric motor with rotor coil. Its peak power is 44 kW (59 hp) at 10,500 rpm, while maximum torque is 226 N⋅m (167 lbf⋅ft). Its top speed is capped electronically to 130 km/h (81 mph). The vehicle is powered by a 22 kWh lithium-ion battery pack that delivers a combined cycle range of 170 km (110 mi) NEDC which varies depending on factors such as type of road, ambient temperature, speed or driving style. Maximum charging power is limited to 3.7 kW (AC).

The Kangoo Z.E. 33 (a.k.a. Power+), released in 2017, includes four changes: a new battery, a new motor, a new charger, and a heat pump. The new battery has a capacity of 33 kWh for a range of 270 km (170 mi) according to the NEDC cycle. The new R60 traction motor produces the same peak power 44 kW (59 hp), but was developed by Renault, based on the R90 motor found in Renault Zoe. Charging power has doubled to 7 kW, and the heat pump provides a more efficient method of heating the cabin.

== Third generation XFK (FFK/KFK; 2020) ==
Third generation
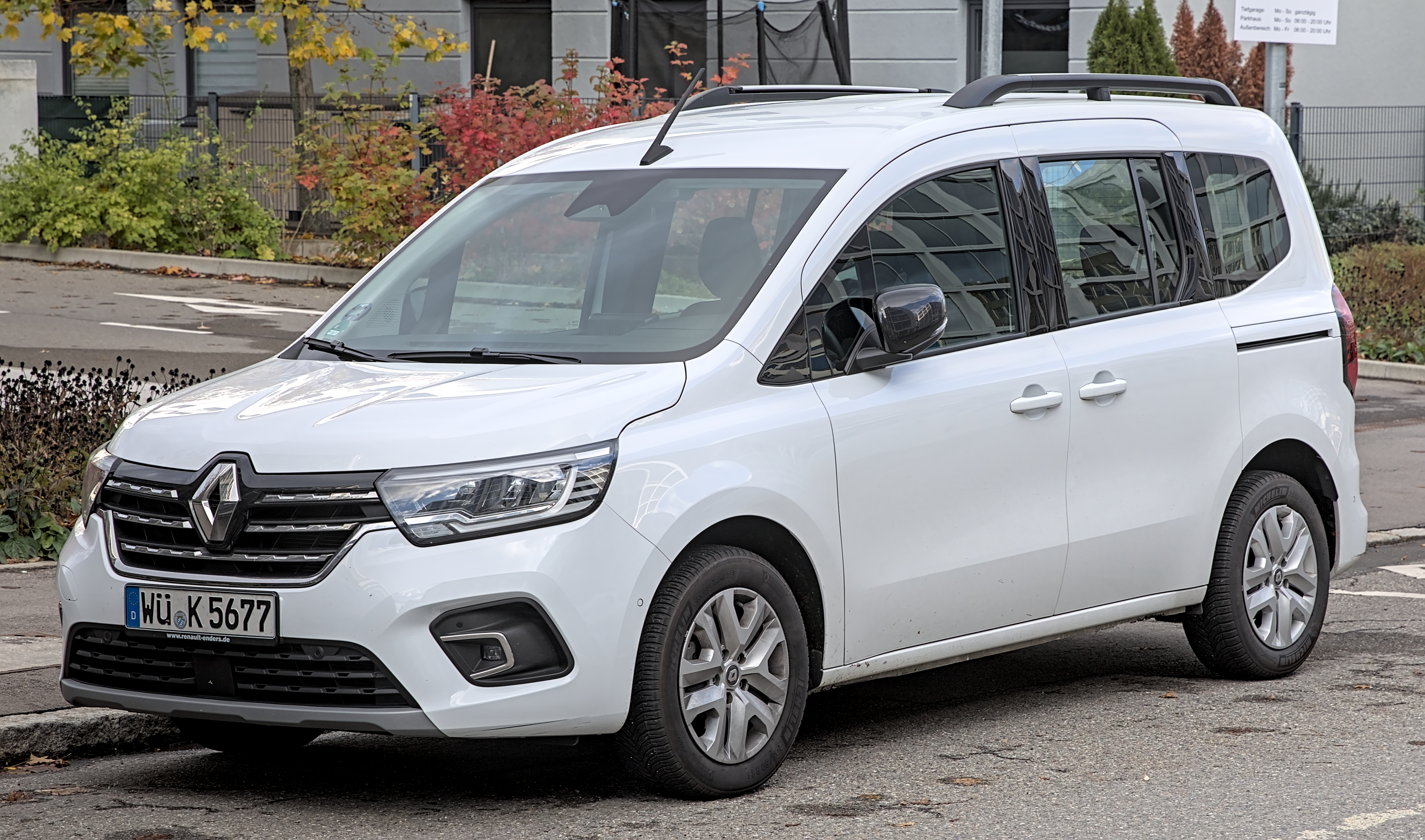

Overview
- Also called: Mercedes-Benz Citan/T-Class/EQT; Nissan Townstar/Townstar Evalia
- Production: 2020–present
- Assembly: France: Maubeuge (ElectriCity Maubeuge Plant)

Body and chassis
- Body style: 3/5-door panel van 5-door LAV
- Platform: Renault–Nissan CMF-CD platform

Powertrain
- Engine: Petrol: 1.3 L H5Ht turbo I4; Diesel: 1.5 L K9K I4
- Transmission: 6-speed manual 7-speed EDC

Dimensions
- Wheelbase: 2,716 mm (106.9 in)
- Length: 4,486 mm (176.6 in)
- Width: 1,919 mm (75.6 in)
- Height: 1,838 mm (72.4 in)
- Curb weight: 1,475–1,688 kg (3,252–3,721 lb)

Chronology
- Predecessor: Nissan e-NV200 (for Townstar EV)

The third-generation Kangoo was revealed on 12 November 2020, alongside the lower-spec, separate model called Express. It is based on an all-new CMF-CD platform developed by Renault and Nissan. Production started late 2020 and sales early 2021.

A rebadged version called the Nissan Townstar was revealed in September 2021 to replace the NV200 and NV250 in various markets. In Europe, the electric Nissan e-NV200 will be replaced by a Townstar EV based on the Kangoo E-Tech Electric.

In 2024, the Kangoo was slightly updated with Renault's latest logo.

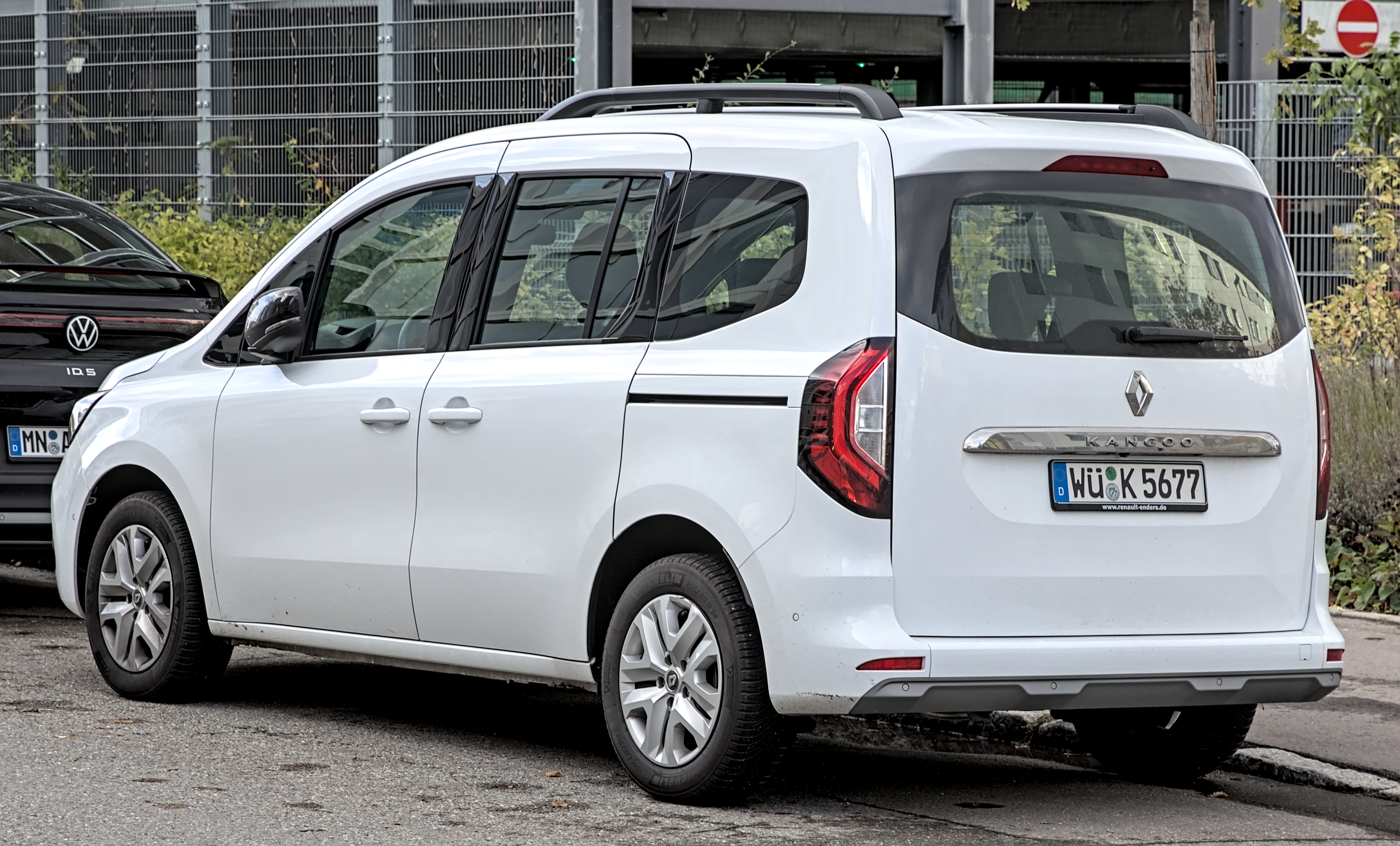
Rear view

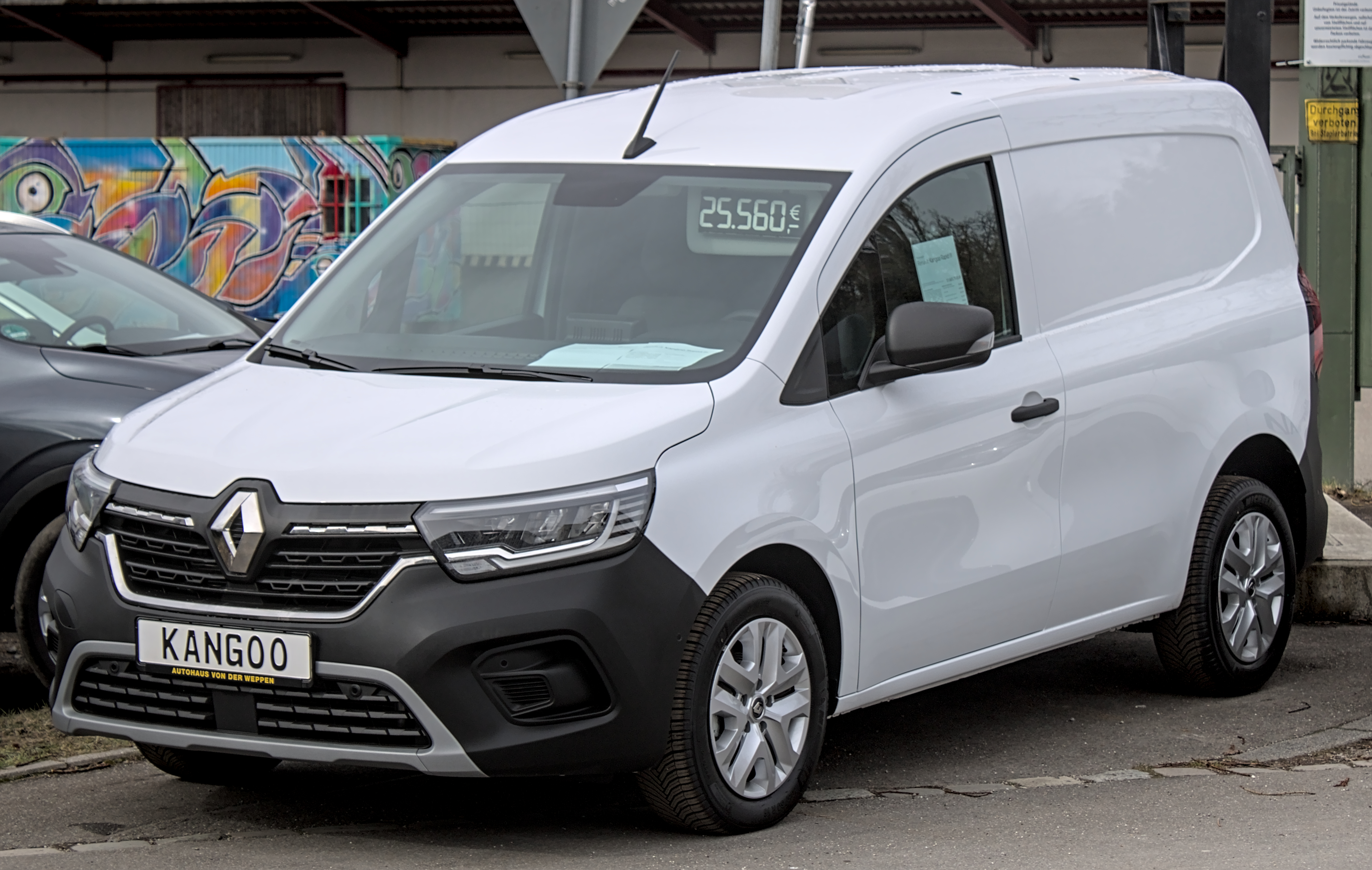
Renault Kangoo van

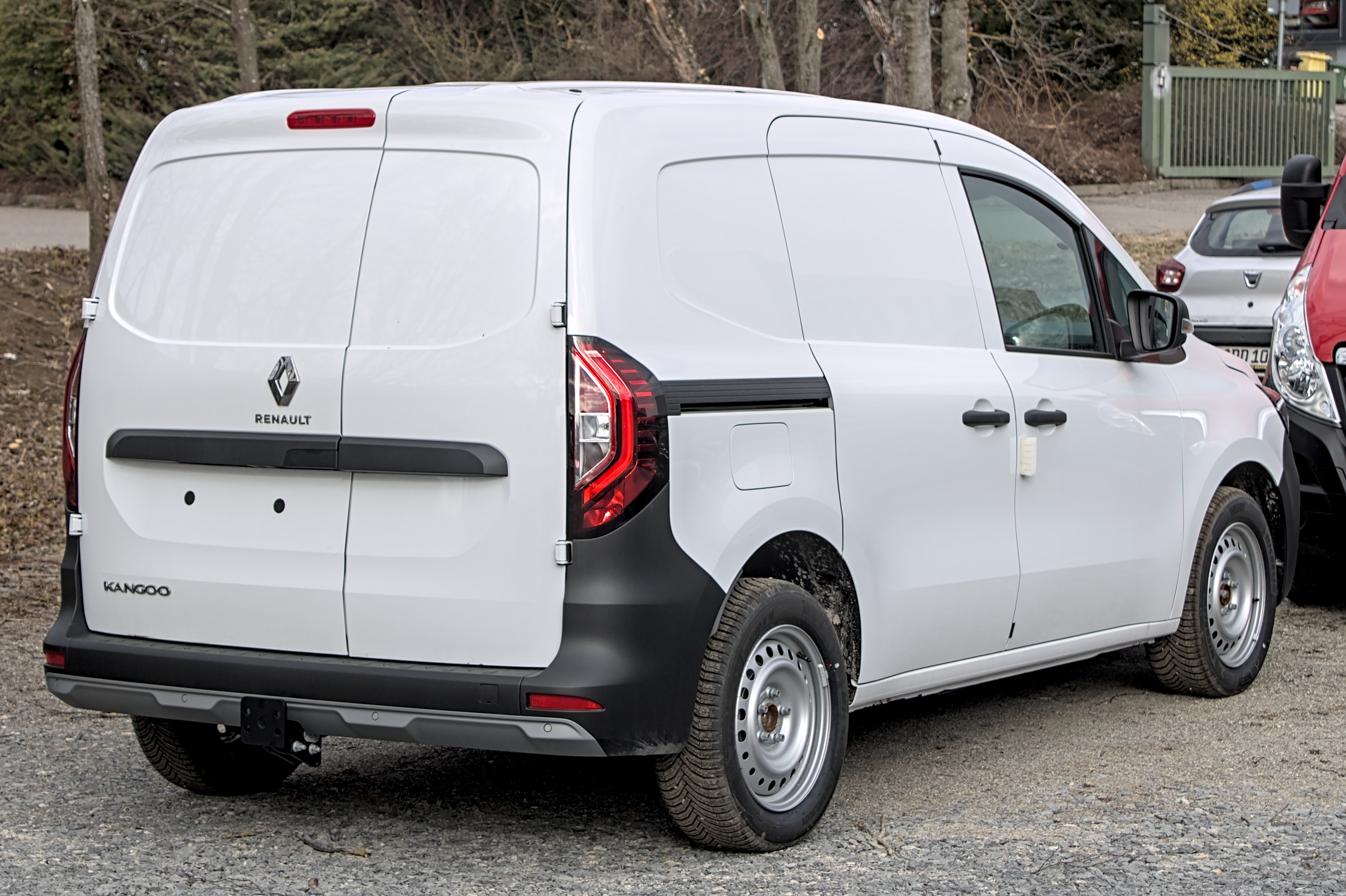
Renault Kangoo van

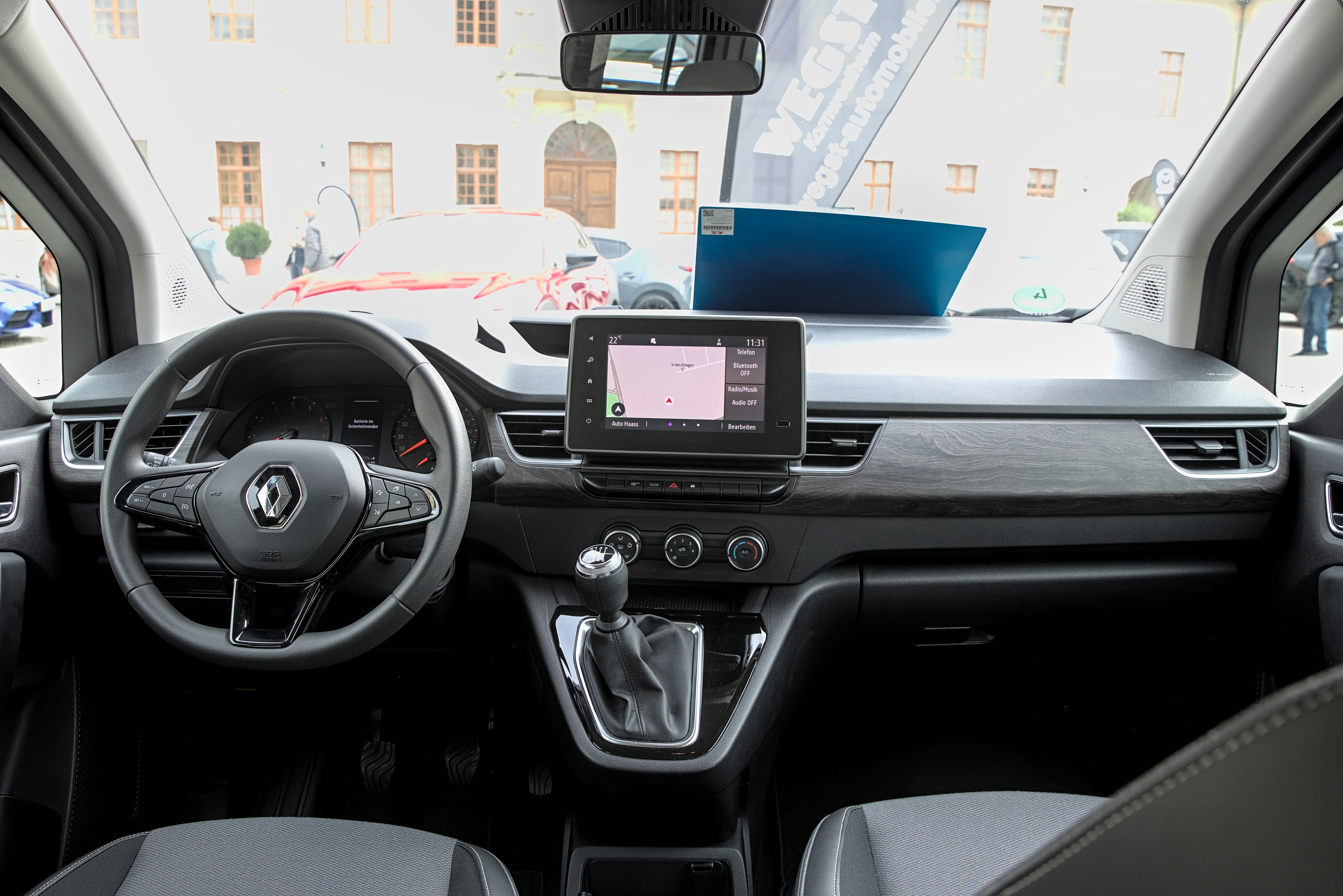
Interior

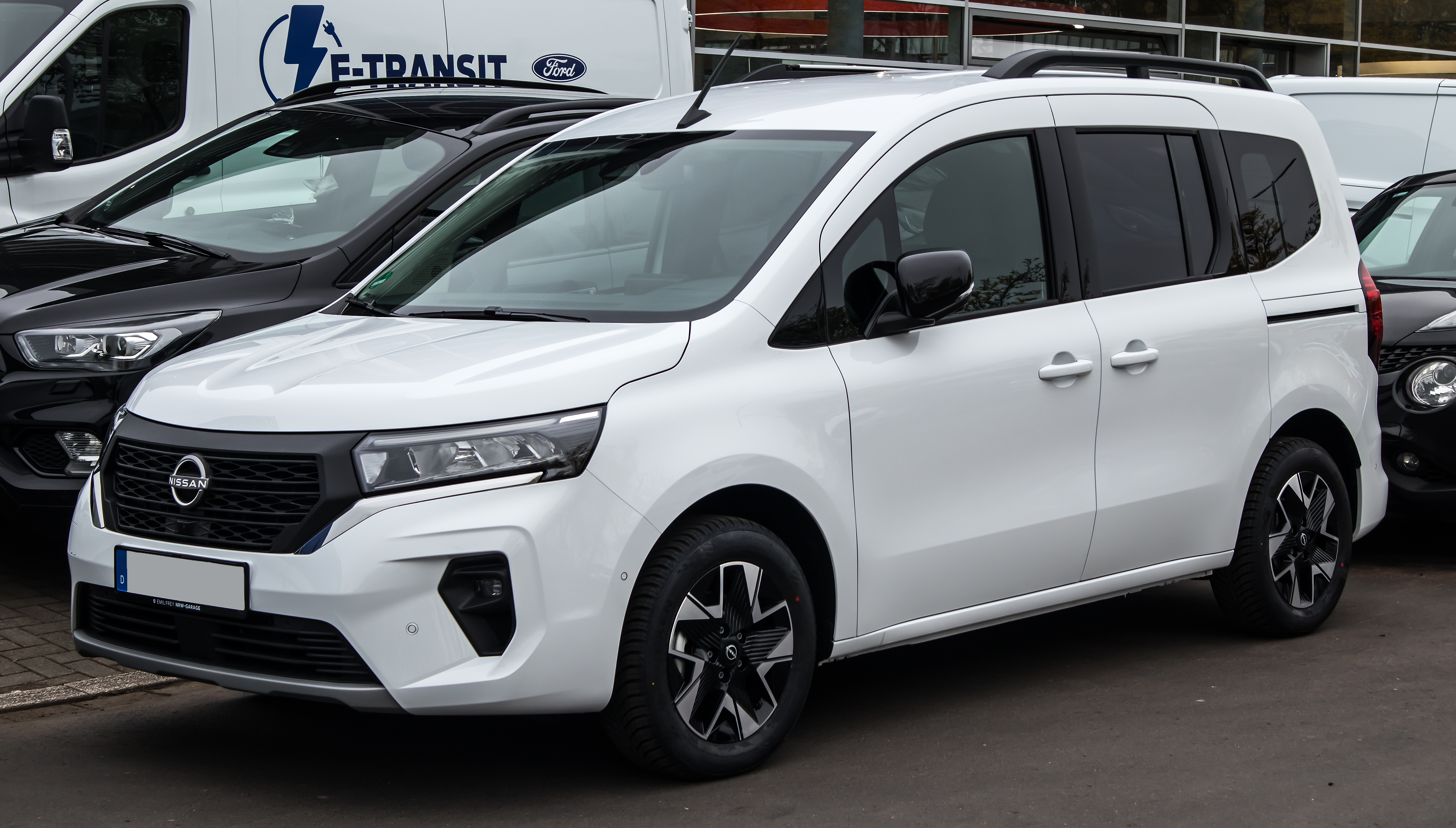
Nissan Townstar (front)

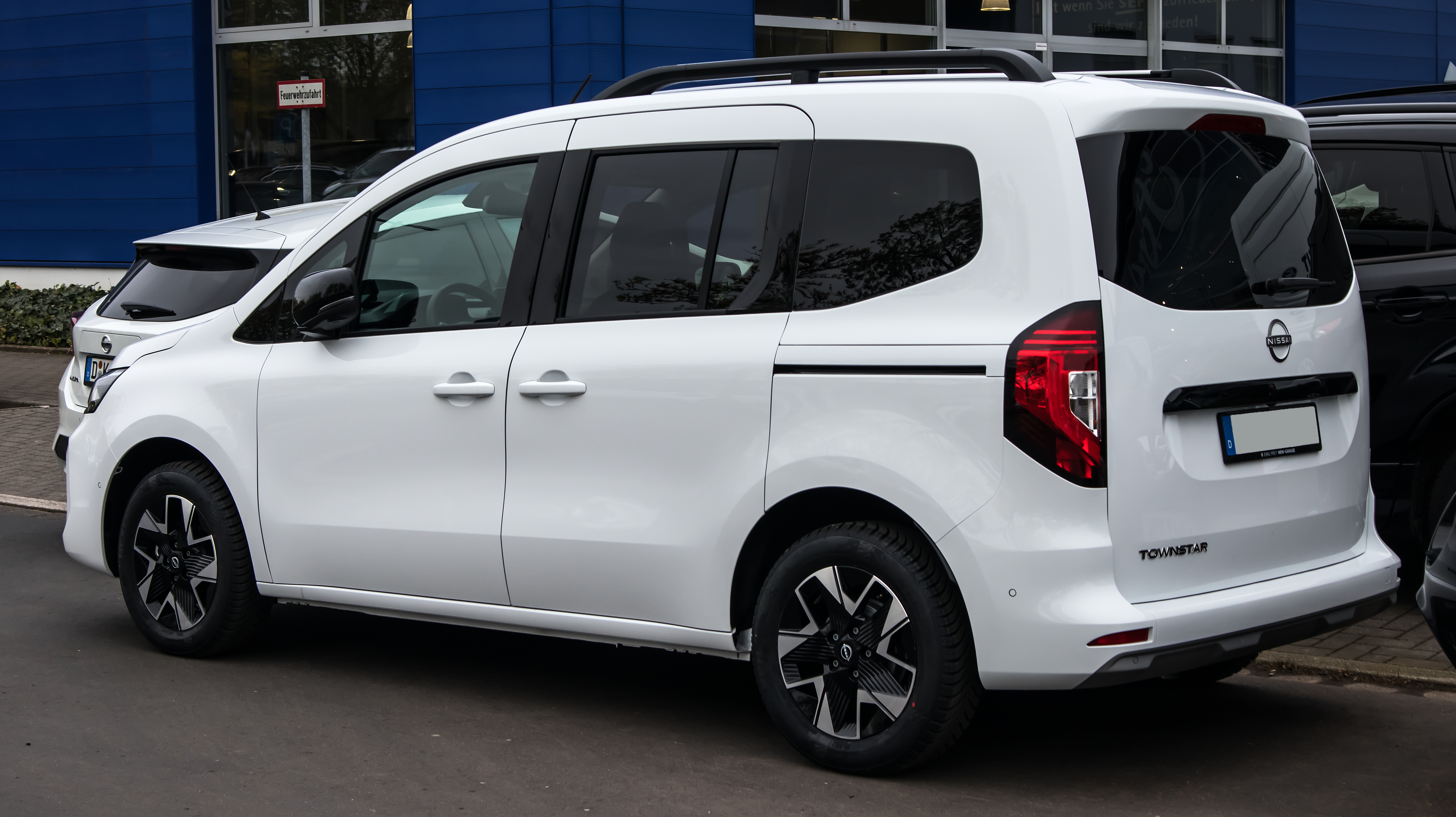
Nissan Townstar (rear)

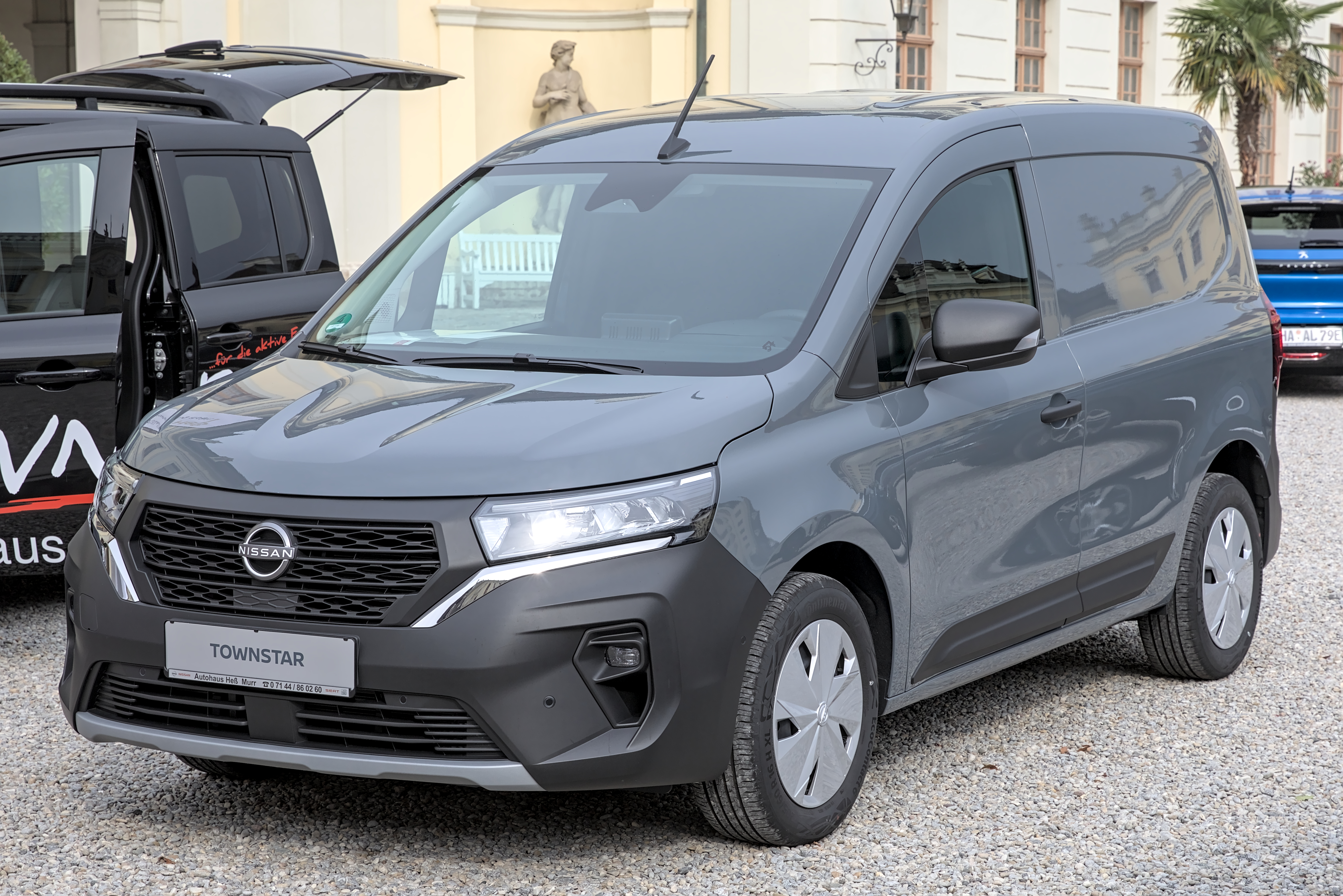
Nissan Townstar Van

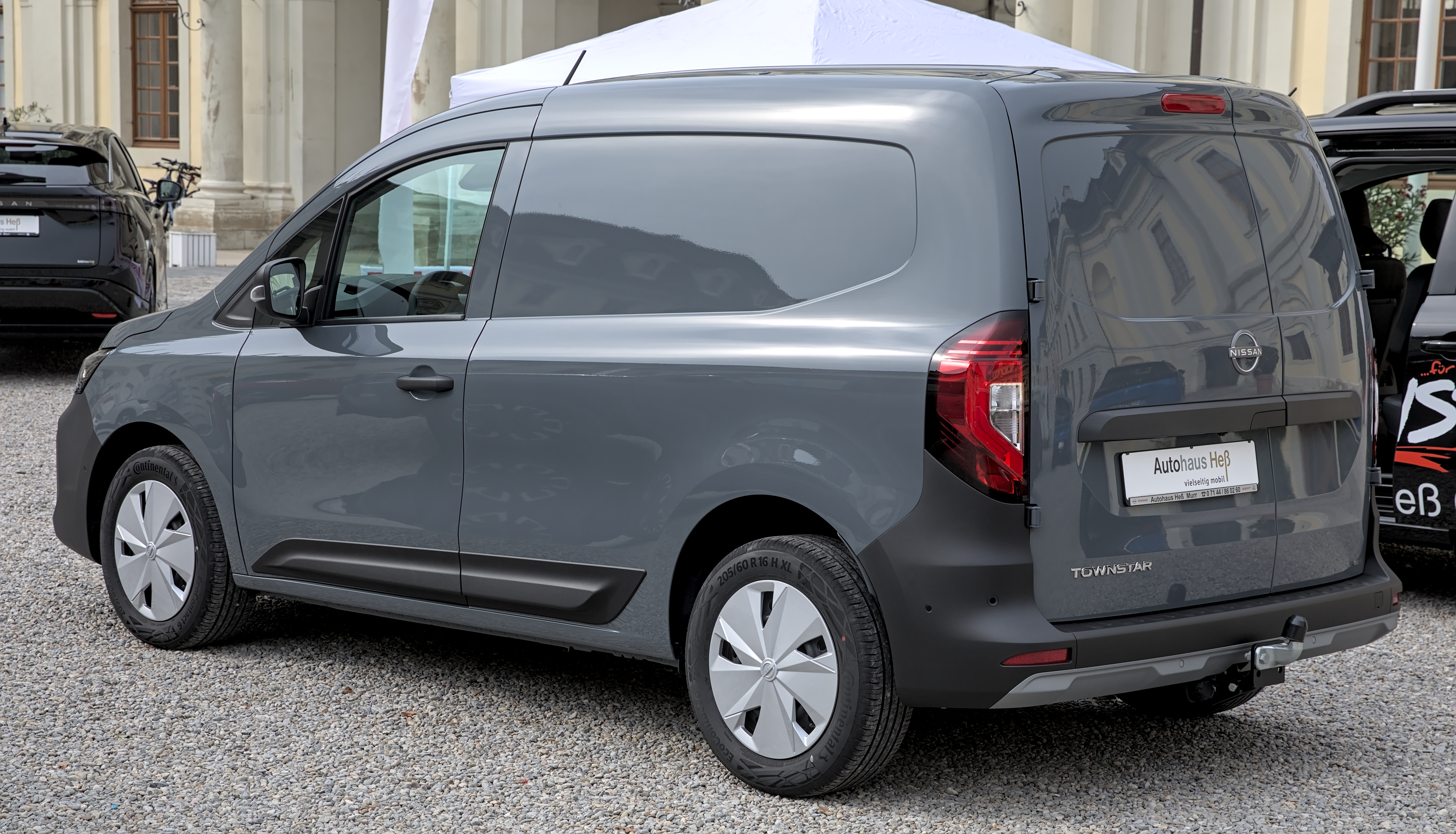
Nissan Townstar Van

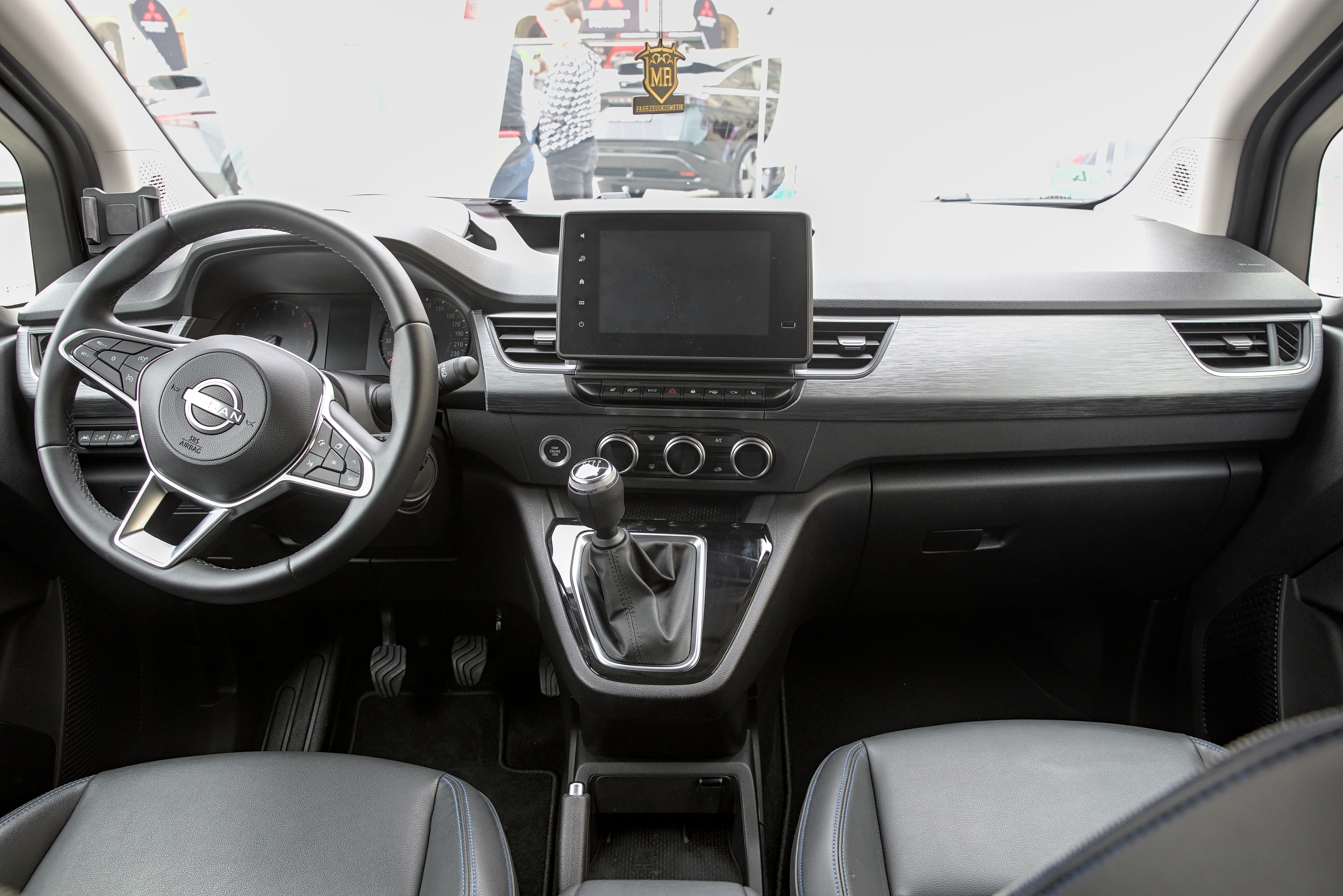
Nissan Townstar (interior)

=== Engines ===
Engines
Model	Engine	Displacement	Valvetrain	Fuel system	Max. power at rpm	Max. torque at rpm	Gearbox	Years	Consumption	CO_{2}
Petrol engines
TCe 100	Nissan H5Ht	1,333 cc	DOHC 16v	Direct injection	75 kW (102 PS; 101 hp) at 4,500 rpm	200 N⋅m (148 lb⋅ft) at 1,500 rpm	6-speed manual	2021–2025	6.8 L/100 km (41.5 mpg_{‑imp})	155 g/mi (96 g/km)
TCe 130	Nissan H5Ht	1,333 cc	DOHC 16v	Direct injection	96 kW (131 PS; 129 hp) at 4,500 rpm	200 N⋅m (148 lb⋅ft) at 1,500 rpm	6-speed manual	2021–present	6.9 L/100 km (40.9 mpg_{‑imp})	157–158 g/mi (98–98 g/km)
Diesel engines
Blue dCi 75	Renault K9K	1,461 cc	SOHC 8v	Common rail direct injection	55 kW (75 PS; 74 hp) at 3,750 rpm	220 N⋅m (162 lb⋅ft) at 1,750 rpm	6-speed manual/7-speed automatic	2021–2024	5.4 L/100 km (52 mpg_{‑imp})	141 / 143 g/mi (88 / 89 g/km)
Blue dCi 95	Renault K9K	1,461 cc	SOHC 8v	Common rail direct injection	70 kW (95 PS; 94 hp) at 3,750 rpm	260 N⋅m (192 lb⋅ft) at 1,750 rpm	6-speed manual/7-speed automatic	2021–present	5.3 L/100 km (53.3 mpg_{‑imp})	139 g/mi (86 g/km)
Blue dCi 115 EDC	Renault K9K	1,461 cc	SOHC 8v	Common rail direct injection	85 kW (116 PS; 114 hp) at 3,750 rpm	270 N⋅m (199 lb⋅ft) at 1,750 rpm	7-speed automatic	2021–present	5.6 L/100 km (50.4 mpg_{‑imp})	147 g/mi (91 g/km)
Model	Charger	Battery	Range	Motor	Max. power at rpm	Max. torque at rpm	Gearbox	Years	Consumption	CO_{2}
Electric
E-Tech	22 kW (AC); 80 kW (DC)	Li-ion, 44 kW-hr (net)	299 km (186 mi) (WLTP)	synchronous with coiled rotor	90 / 45 kW (122 / 61 PS; 121 / 60 hp) Normal/Eco	245 N⋅m (181 lb⋅ft)	Single-speed reduction gear	2021–present	–	0 g/mi (0 g/km)

=== Dimensions ===
Key Kangoo (3rd generation) dimensions
Length Height				L1		L2
Length Height				Exterior	4,486 mm (176.6 in)	4,910 mm (193.3 in)
Length Height				WB	2,716 mm (106.9 in)	3,100 mm (122.0 in)
Length Height				Interior	1,806 mm (71.1 in)	2,230 mm (87.8 in)
H1	Exterior	Interior	Volume	3.3 m^{3} (120 ft^{3})		4.2 m^{3} (150 ft^{3})
H1	1,864 mm (73.4 in)	1,215 mm (47.8 in)	Volume	3.3 m^{3} (120 ft^{3})		4.2 m^{3} (150 ft^{3})

Notes

- Interior width is 1,570 mm (61.8 in) for all versions, 1,248 mm (49.1 in) between the internal wheel arches.

=== Kangoo E-Tech Electric ===
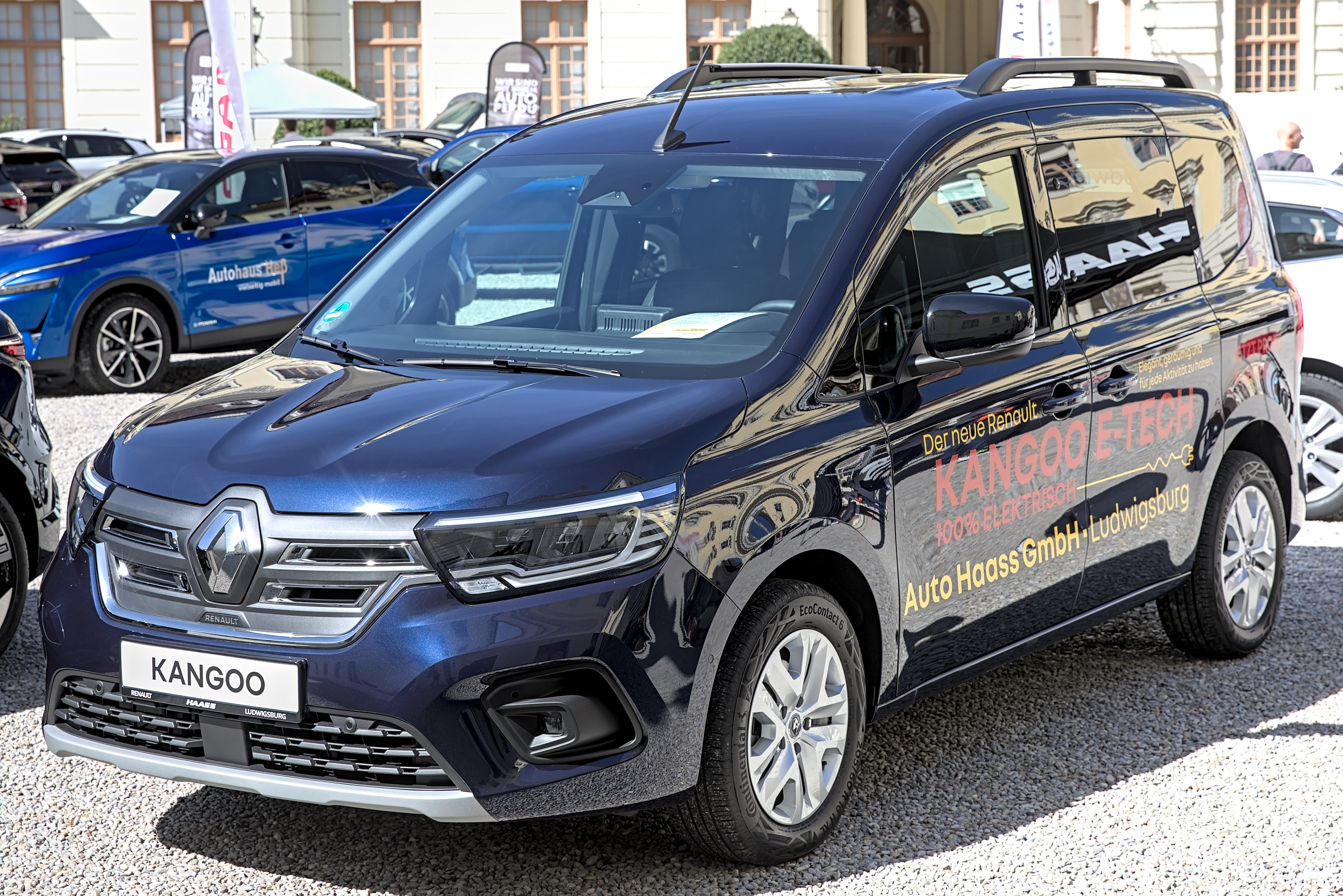
Renault Kangoo E-Tech

The third generation Renault Kangoo was previewed by the Renault Kangoo Z.E. concept presented on 23 April 2019, which was said to be 80% representative of the production model. The Kangoo Z.E. concept (2019) is an electric vehicle and has no pillar at the leading edge of the sliding side door to facilitate access, like the Frendzy concept. A prototype of the production electric Kangoo, renamed to Kangoo Van E-Tech Electric, was first shown in March 2021. It was officially introduced in November 2021 to succeed the prior electric Kangoo Z.E., which was based on the second-generation Kangoo and had been produced since 2011. Production was scheduled to start in 2022.

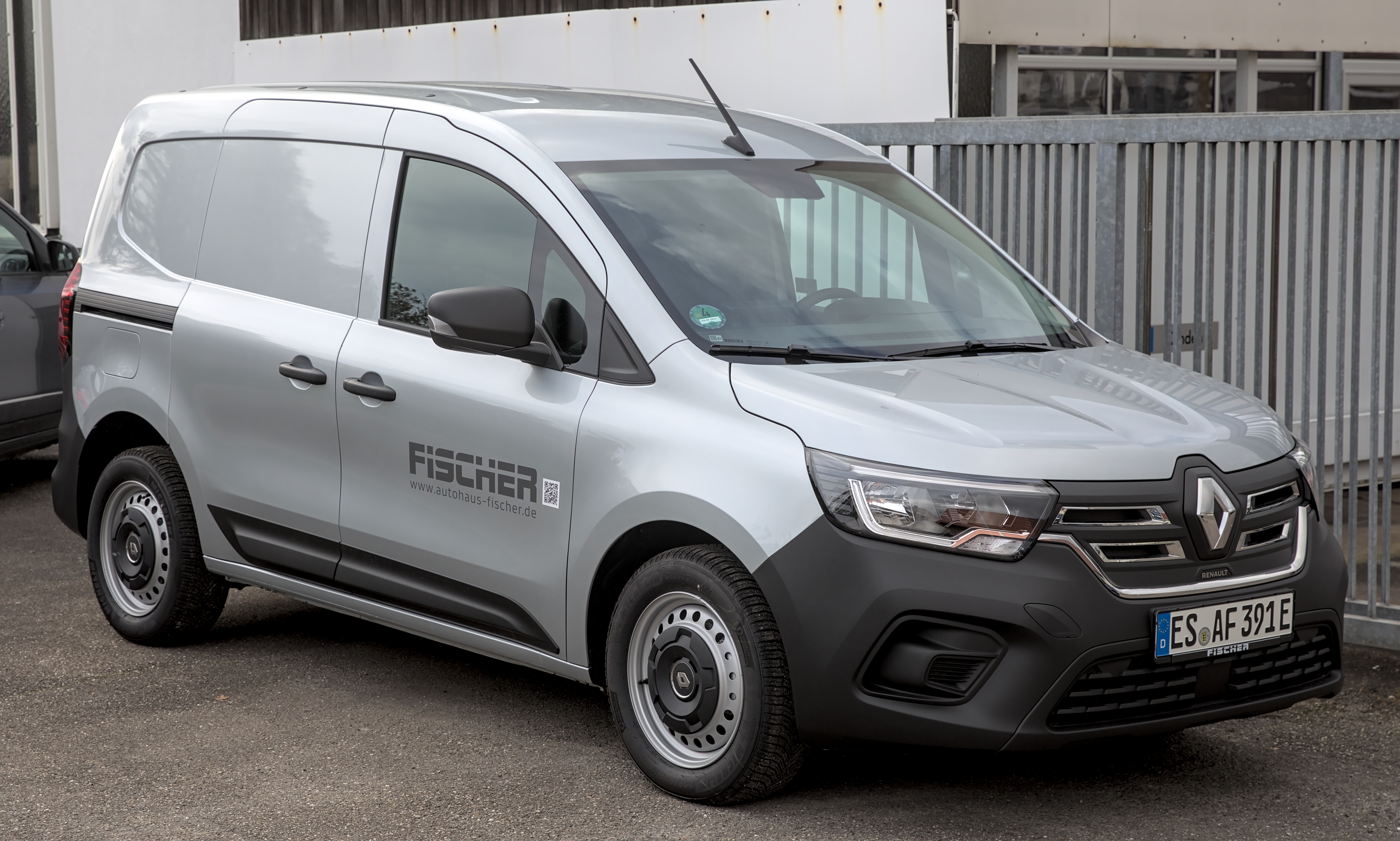
Renault Kangoo Van E-Tech

The 100% electric production panel van model entered production in June 2022. It is offered in two lengths, with cargo volume of 3.9 m^{3} (140 cu ft) or 4.9 m^{3} (170 cu ft). The passenger version was launched in October 2022 at the 2022 Paris Motor Show.

The Kangoo E-Tech is equipped with a traction motor that delivers 90 kW (120 hp) and 245 N⋅m (181 lbf⋅ft), drawing from a 45 kW-hr battery which gives the vehicle an estimated range of 285–300 km (177–186 mi) under the WLTP mixed driving cycle. So equipped, the van accelerates from 0 to 100 km/h (0 to 62 mph) in 11.6 seconds and has a top speed of 135 km/h (84 mph). There is a limited-power Eco mode, which reduces output to 56 kW (75 hp) and maximum speed to 110 km/h (68 mph). The standard onboard charger is limited to 11 kW (AC); as an option, the vehicle can be fitted with a charger that allows input power up to 80 kW (DC) or 22 kW (AC).

=== Safety ===
==== Euro NCAP ====
Euro NCAP test results Renault Kangoo 1.3 TCe (LHD) (2021)
Test	Points	%
Overall:	4 /5 stars	
Adult occupant:	29.9	78%
Child occupant:	43	87%
Pedestrian:	36.6	67%
Safety assist:	11.6	72%

The Townstar in its standard European market configuration received 4 stars from Euro NCAP in 2021 with its results borrowed from the Kangoo.

Euro NCAP test results Renault Kangoo Van (2025)
Test	Score
Overall:	5 /5 stars
Safe driving	79%
Crash avoidance	74%
Post crash	80%

Euro NCAP test results Mercedes-Benz Citan (2025)
Test	Score
Overall:	5 /5 stars
Safe driving	79%
Crash avoidance	74%
Post crash	80%

Euro NCAP test results Nissan Townstar (2025)
Test	Score
Overall:	5 /5 stars
Safe driving	79%
Crash avoidance	74%
Post crash	80%

== Production ==
=== Nissan NV250 ===
Calendar year	Nissan NV250
2019	3,561
2020	2,282
2021	4,475

=== Third-generation model ===
Calendar year	Renault model	Mercedes model	Nissan model
2021	90,241	?	?
2022	58,028	16,004	?
2023	109,760	25,753	11,626
