= Plug-in hybrid =

Hybrid vehicle with externally chargeable battery

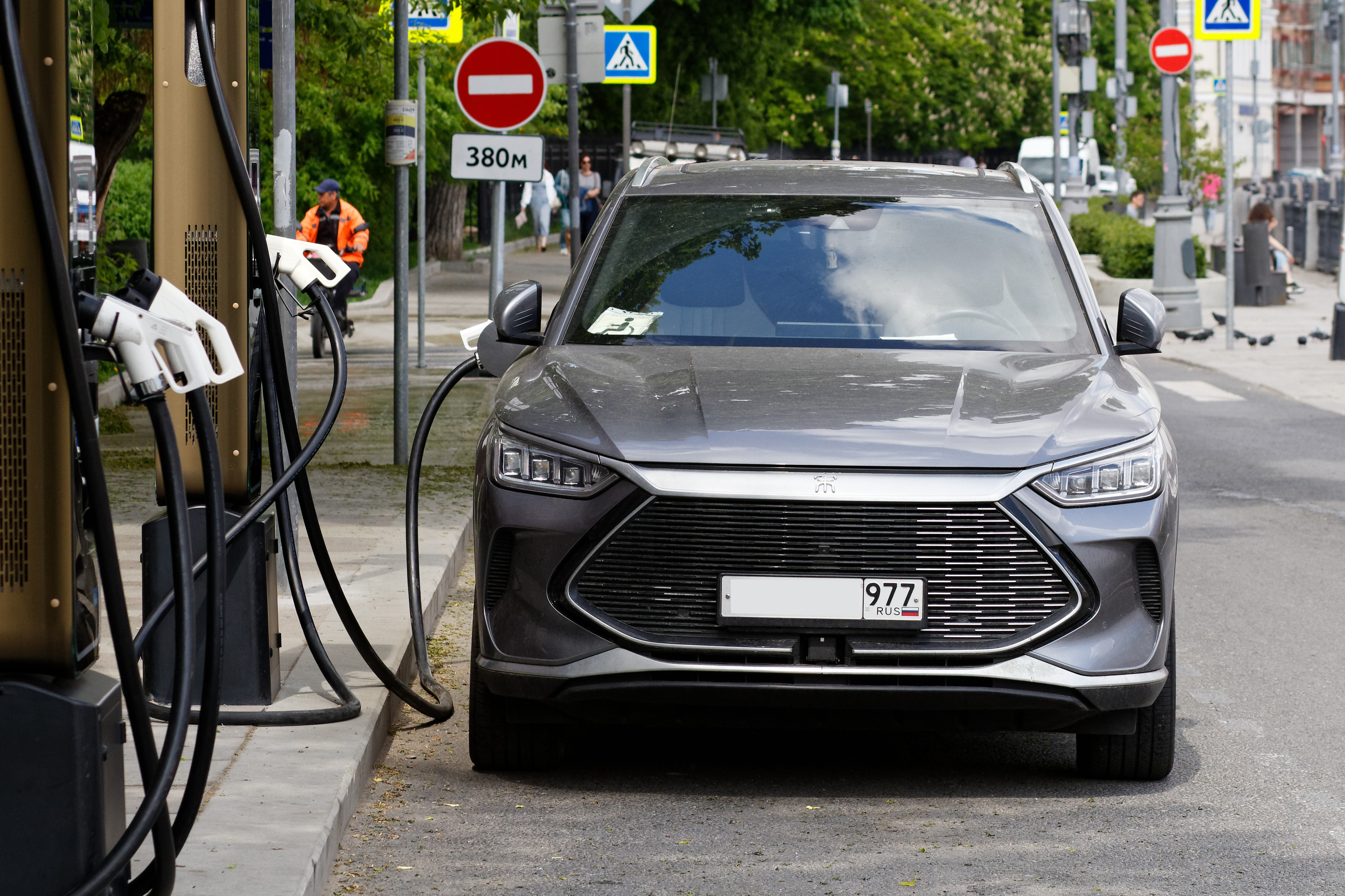
The BYD Song plug-in hybrid SUV series is the world's all-time best-selling plug-in hybrid with over 1,050,000 cumulative sales in December 2023.

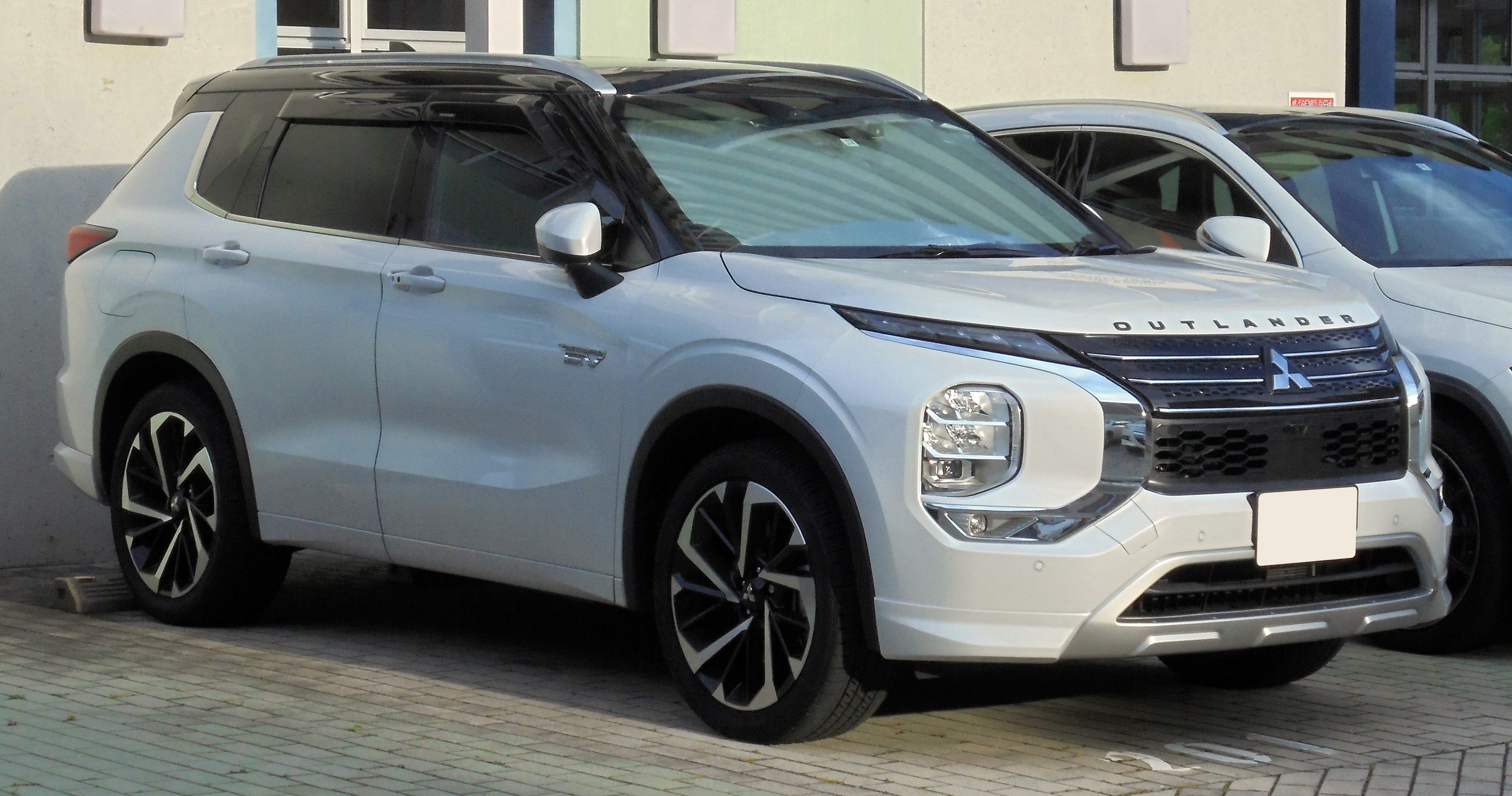
The Mitsubishi Outlander PHEV was once the world's all-time best-selling plug-in hybrid until 2022. Cumulative global sales reached 290,000 units in September 2021.

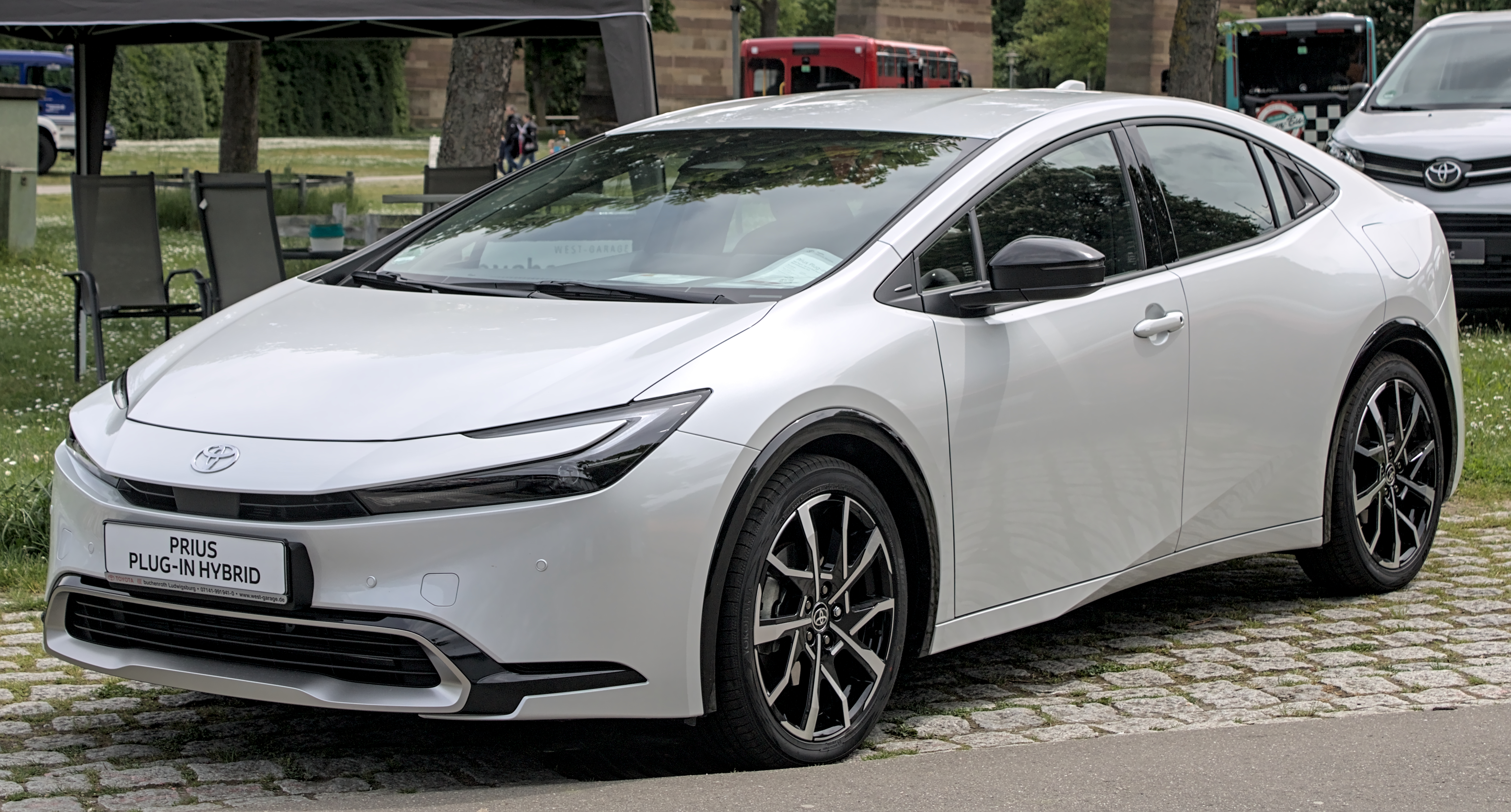
Toyota Prius Plug-in Hybrid

A plug-in hybrid electric vehicle (PHEV) or plug-in hybrid vehicle (PHV) is a type of hybrid electric vehicle equipped with a battery that can be recharged via a power cable to an external electric power source, in addition to charging internally by its on-board internal combustion engine–powered generator. While PHEVs are predominantly passenger cars, there are also plug-in hybrid variants of sports cars, commercial vehicles, vans, utility trucks, buses, trains, motorcycles, mopeds, military vehicles and boats.

Similar to battery electric vehicles (BEVs), plug-in hybrids can use centralized generators of renewable energy (e.g., solar, wind or hydroelectric) to be largely emission-free, or a fossil plant in which case they displace greenhouse gas emissions from the car tailpipe exhaust to the power station. As opposed to conventional hybrid electric vehicles (HEVs), PHEVs generally have a larger battery pack that can be recharged (theoretically) from anywhere with access to the electrical grid, offering enhanced energy efficiency and cost-effectiveness when compared to relying solely on the on-board generator. Additionally, PHEVs can support longer and more frequent all-electric range driving, and their electric motors often have higher power output and torque, are more responsive during acceleration, and, overall, have lower operating costs. Although a PHEV's battery pack is smaller than that of all-electric vehicles of the same weight, as it must accommodate its combustion engine and hybrid drivetrain, it provides the added flexibility of reverting to the use of its gasoline/diesel engine if the battery charge is depleted. This feature helps alleviate range anxiety, particularly in areas lacking sufficient charging infrastructure.

Mass-produced PHEVs have been available to the public in China and the United States since 2012, with the introduction of the Toyota Prius PHV, which was the best selling PHV until it was surpassed by the Mitsubishi Outlander PHEV. By 2021, BYD Auto emerged as the largest plug-in hybrid vehicle manufacturer in the world. As of May 2024, BYD plug-in hybrid cumulative sales surpassed 3.6 million units. The BYD Song DM line of SUVs contributed over 1.05 million units.

China currently has the largest stock of PHEVs in the world, with cumulative sales of 9.31 million units (including EREV) through December 2024. In 2024, over 76% of global PHEV sales was contributed by the Chinese market. In addition, the five largest producers of PHEVs globally are Chinese manufacturers, which are BYD, Geely, Chery, Li Auto, and Changan.

== History ==
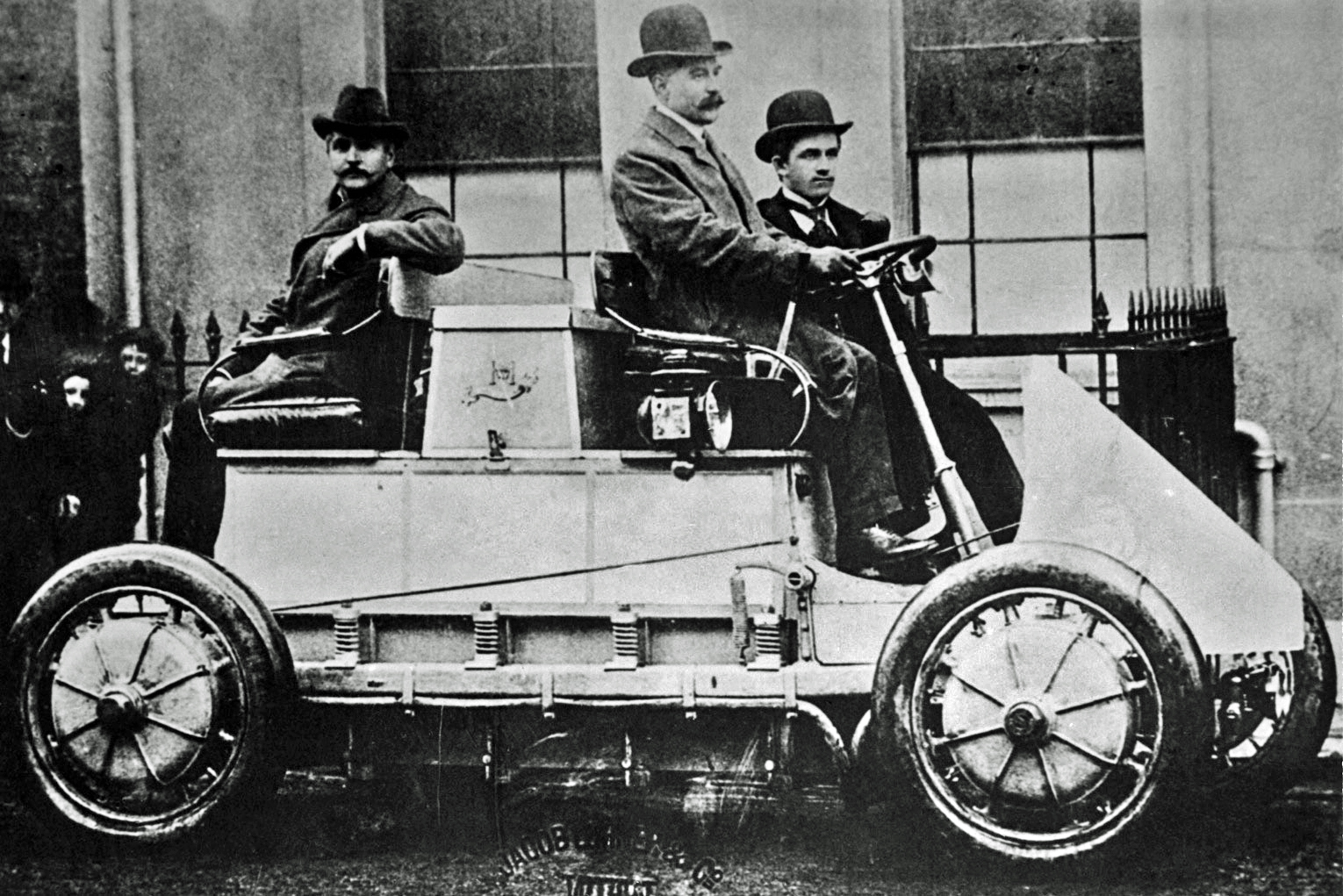
The Lohner–Porsche Mixte Hybrid was the first gasoline-electric plug-in hybrid automobile.

=== Invention and early interest ===
The Lohner–Porsche Mixte Hybrid, produced as early as 1899, was the first hybrid electric car. Early hybrids could be charged from an external source before operation. The term "plug-in hybrid" has come to mean a hybrid vehicle that can be charged from a standard electrical wall socket. The term "plug-in hybrid electric vehicle" was coined by UC Davis Professor Andrew Frank, who has been called the "father of the modern plug-in hybrid".

The July 1969 issue of Popular Science featured an article on the General Motors XP-883 plug-in hybrid. The concept commuter vehicle housed six 12-volt lead–acid batteries in the trunk area and a transverse-mounted DC electric motor turning a front-wheel drive. The car can be plugged into a standard North American 120-volt AC outlet to recharge.

=== Revival of interest ===
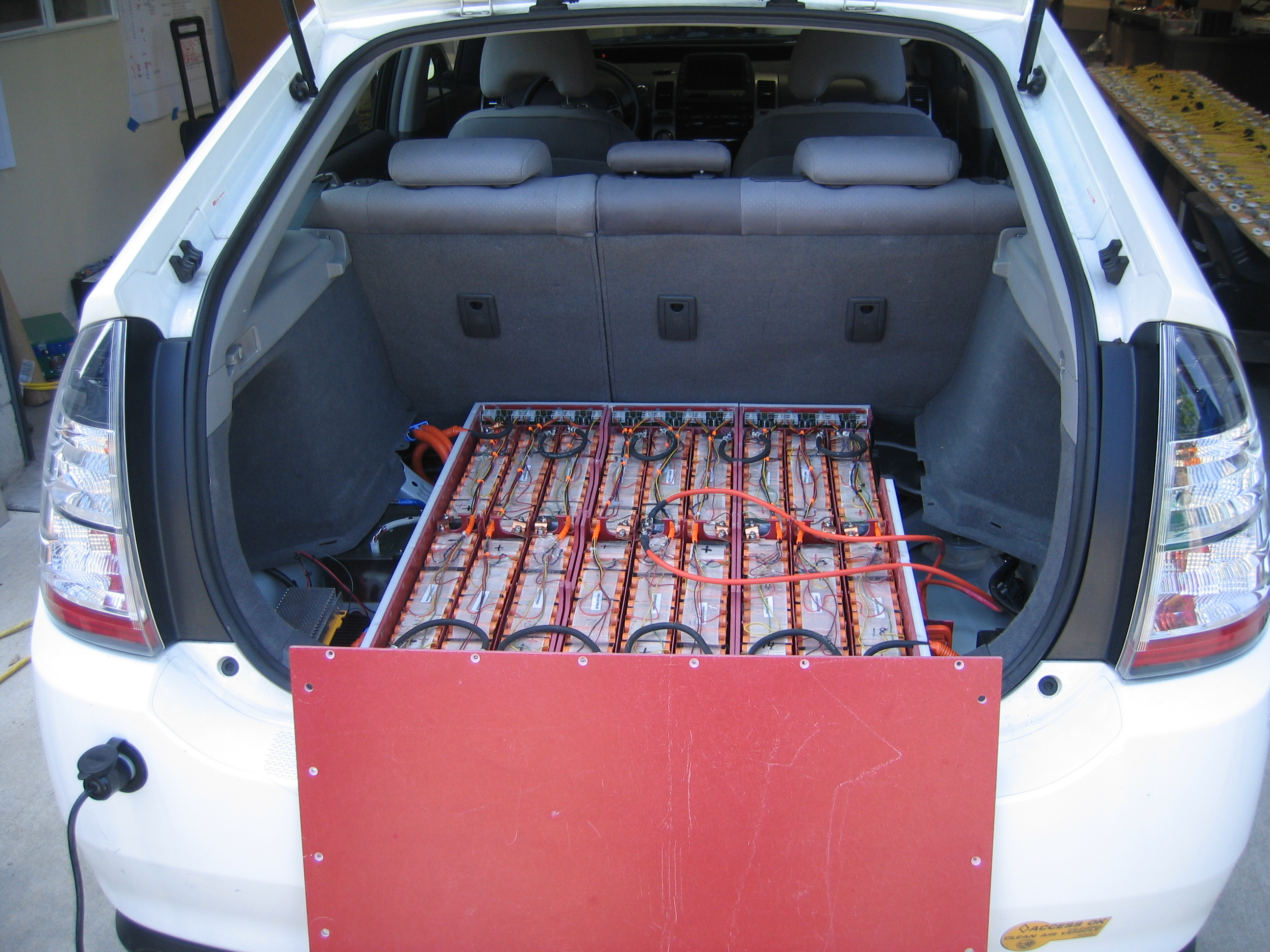
Lithium-ion battery pack, with cover removed, in a CalCars "PRIUS+" plug-in hybrid converted Toyota Prius converted by EnergyCS

In 2003, Renault began selling the Elect'road, a plug-in series-hybrid version of its popular Kangoo, in Europe. In addition to its engine, it could be plugged into a standard outlet and recharged to 95% range in about 4 hours. After selling about 500 vehicles, primarily in France, Norway and the UK, the Elect'road was redesigned in 2007.

With the availability of hybrid vehicles and the rising gas prices in the United States starting around 2002, interest in plug-in hybrids increased. Some plug-in hybrids were conversions of existing hybrids; for example, the 2004 CalCars conversion of a Prius to add lead acid batteries and a range of up to 15 km (9 mi) using only electric power.

In 2006, both Toyota and General Motors announced plans for plug-in hybrids. GM's Saturn Vue project was canceled, but the Toyota plug-in was certified for road use in Japan in 2007.

In 2007, Quantum Technologies and Fisker Coachbuild, LLC announced the launch of a joint venture in Fisker Automotive. Fisker intended to build a US$80,000 luxury PHEV with 60 km (37 mi) of electric range, the Fisker Karma, initially scheduled for late 2009.

In 2007, Aptera Motors announced their Typ-1 two seater. That company folded in December 2011.

In 2007, Chinese car manufacturer BYD Auto, owned by China's largest mobile phone battery maker, announced it would introduce a production PHEV sedan with 60 km (37 mi) of electric range in China in the second half of 2008. BYD exhibited it at the North American International Auto Show in Detroit in January 2008. Based on BYD's midsize F6 sedan, it uses lithium iron phosphate (LFP)-based batteries instead of lithium-ion batteries and can be recharged to 70% capacity in 10 minutes.

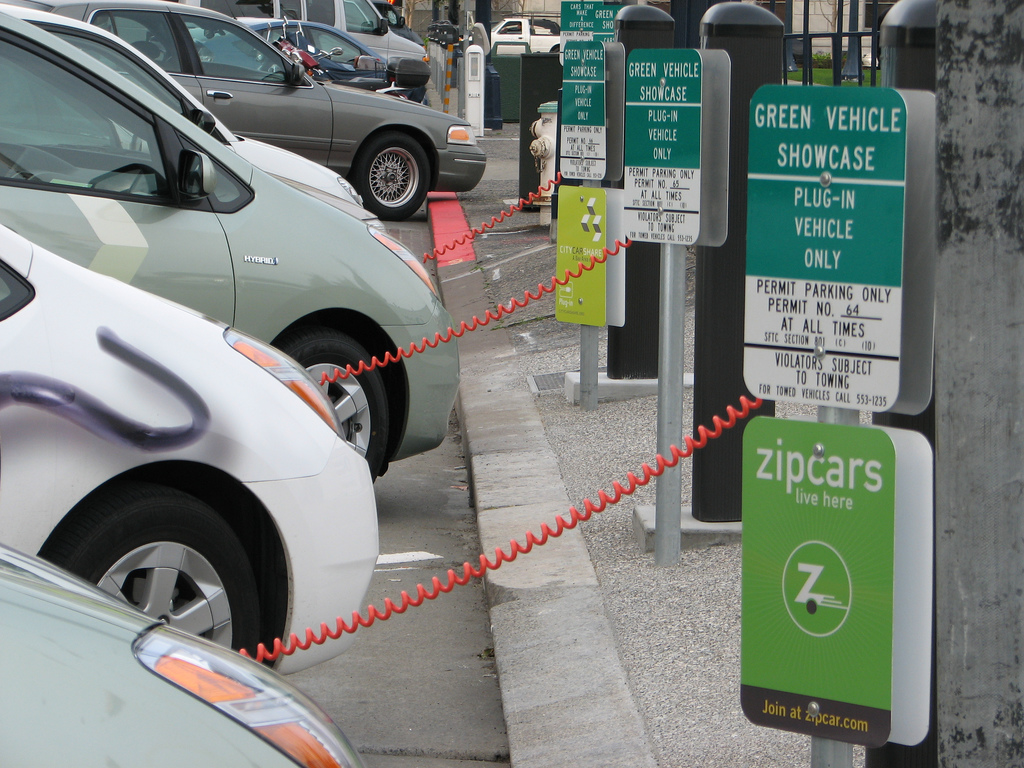
Three plug-in converted Toyota Prius recharging at San Francisco City Hall public charging station

In 2007, Ford delivered the first Ford Escape Plug-in Hybrid of a fleet of 20 demonstration PHEVs to Southern California Edison. As part of this demonstration program, Ford also developed the first flexible-fuel plug-in hybrid SUV, which was delivered in June 2008. This demonstration fleet of plug-ins has been in field testing with utility company fleets in the U.S. and Canada, and during the first two years since the program began, the fleet has logged more than 75,000 miles. In August 2009, Ford delivered the first Escape Plug-in equipped with intelligent vehicle-to-grid (V2G) communications and control system technology, and Ford plans to equip all 21 plug-in hybrid Escapes with the vehicle-to-grid communications technology. Sales of the Escape PHEV were scheduled for 2012.

On January 14, 2008, Toyota announced they would start sales of lithium-ion battery PHEVs by 2010, but later in the year Toyota indicated they would be offered to commercial fleets in 2009.

On March 27, the California Air Resources Board (CARB) modified its regulations, requiring automobile manufacturers to produce 58,000 plug-in hybrids during 2012 through 2014. This requirement is an asked-for alternative to an earlier mandate to produce 25,000 pure zero-emissions vehicles, reducing that requirement to 5,000. On June 26, Volkswagen announced that they would be introducing production plug-ins based on the Volkswagen Golf compact car. Volkswagen uses the term 'TwinDrive' to denote a PHEV. In September, Mazda was reported to be planning PHEVs. On September 23, Chrysler announced that they had prototyped a plug-in Jeep Wrangler and a Chrysler Town and Country minivan, both PHEV with series powertrains, and an all-electric Dodge sports car, and said that one of the three vehicles would go into production.

On October 3, the U.S. enacted the Energy Improvement and Extension Act of 2008. The legislation provided tax credits for the purchase of plug-in electric vehicles of battery capacity over 4 kilowatt-hours. The federal tax credits were extended and modified by the American Clean Energy and Security Act of 2009, but now the battery capacity must be over 5 kWh and the credit phases out after the automaker has sold at least 200,000 vehicles in the U.S.

=== Series production ===
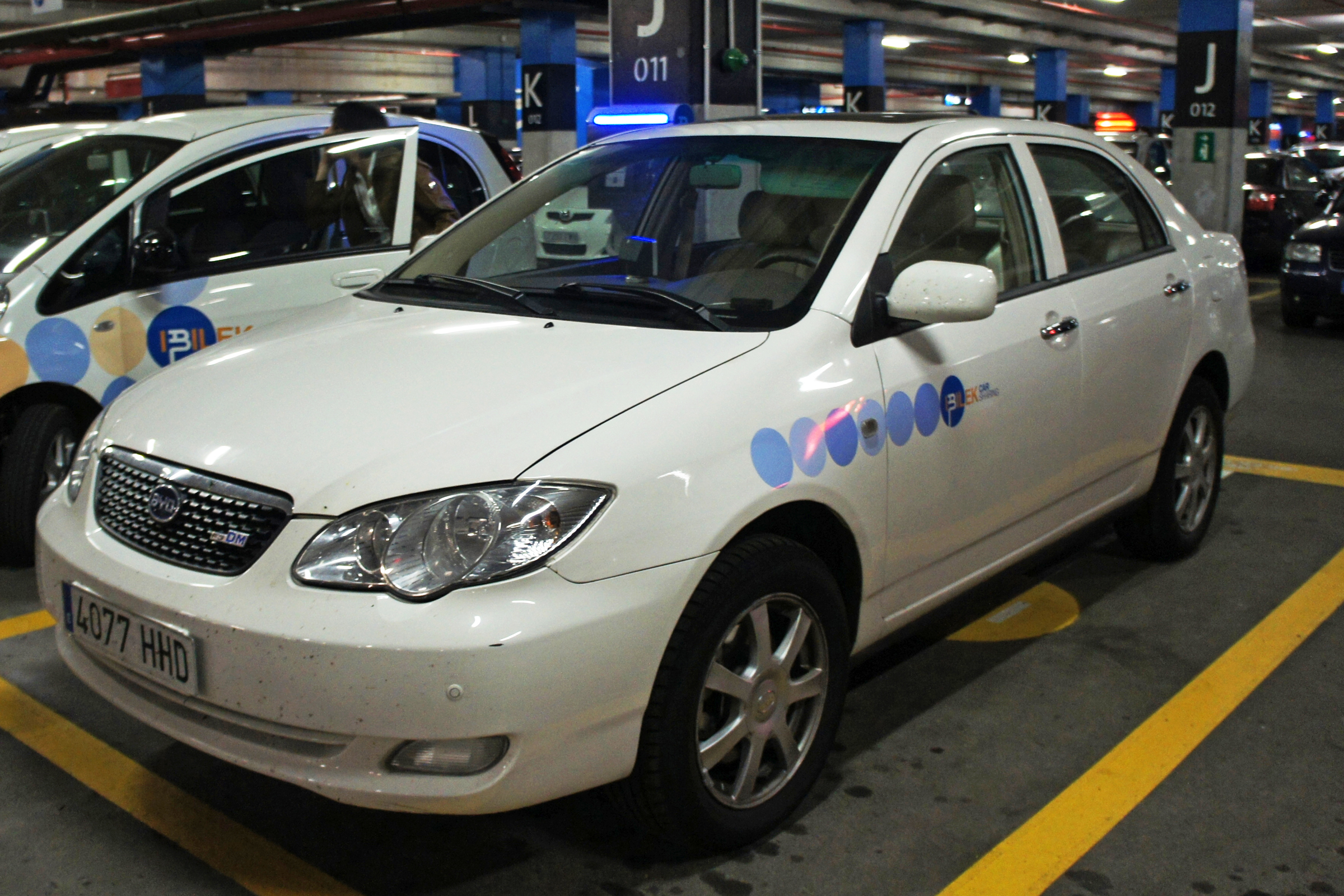
Launched in China in December 2008, the BYD F3DM became the world's first mass-produced plug-in hybrid automobile.

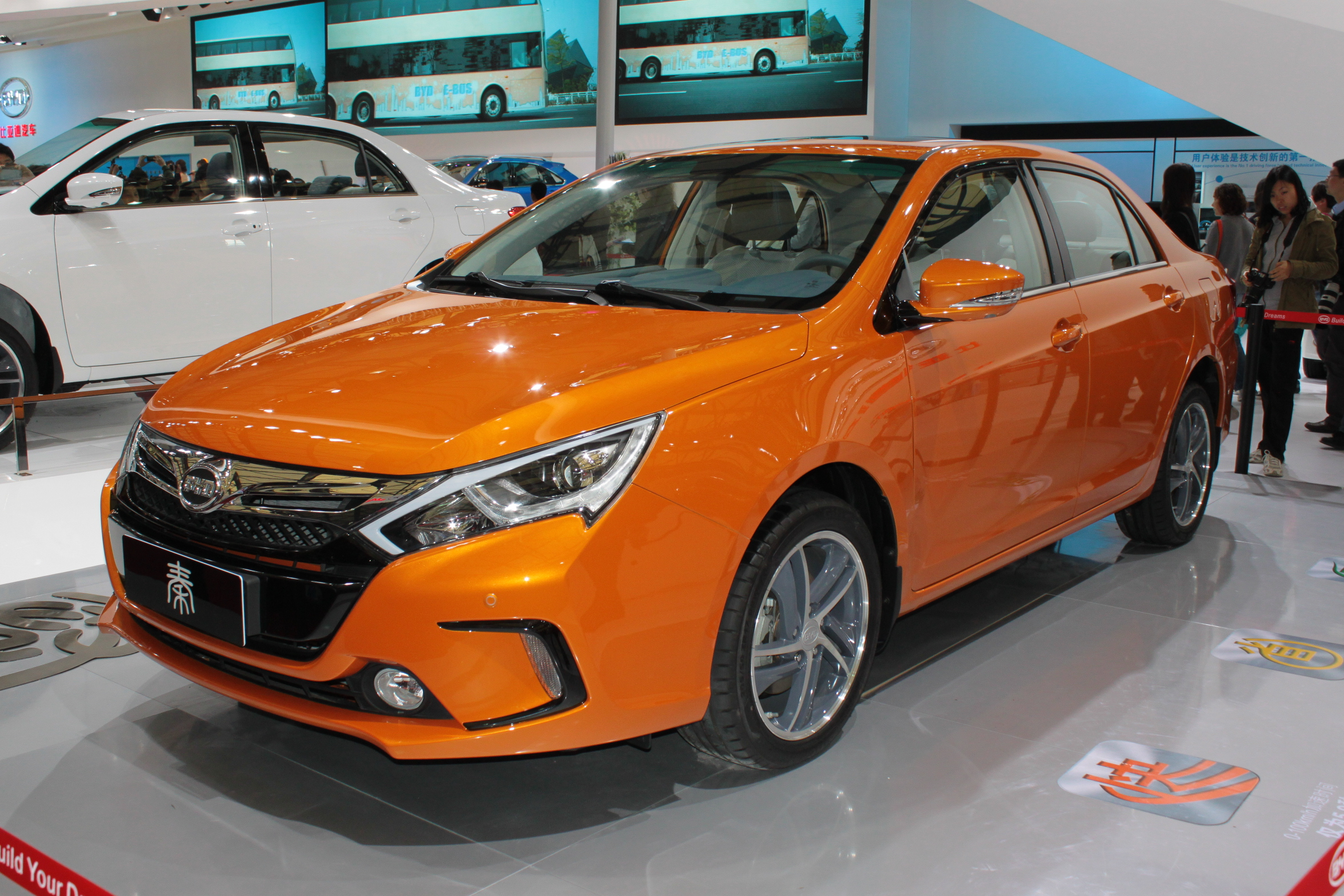
The BYD Qin, released in China in December 2013, replaced the F3DM.

On December 15, 2008, BYD Auto began selling the BYD F3DM in China, becoming the first production plug-in hybrid to be sold worldwide, though it was initially available only to corporate and government customers. Sales to the general public began in Shenzhen in March 2010, but because the F3DM nearly doubles the price of cars that run on conventional fuel, BYD expects subsidies from the local government to make the plug-in affordable to personal buyers.

Toyota tested 600 pre-production Prius Plug-ins in Europe and North America in 2009 and 2010. Volvo Cars built two demonstration versions of Volvo V70 Plug-in Hybrids in 2009 but did not proceed with production. The V60 plug-in hybrid was released in 2011 and was available for sale.

In October 2010 Lotus Engineering unveiled the Lotus CityCar, a plug-in series hybrid concept car designed for flex-fuel operation on ethanol, or methanol as well as regular gasoline.

GM launched the Chevrolet Volt in the U.S. on November 30, 2010, and retail deliveries began in December 2010. Its sibling, the Opel/Vauxhall Ampera was launched in Europe between late 2011 and early 2012. GM calls its Chevrolet Volt series plug-in hybrid an "Extended-Range Electric Vehicle".

The first deliveries of the Fisker Karma took place in July 2011, and deliveries to retail customers began in November 2011. The Toyota Prius Plug-in Hybrid was released in Japan in January 2012, followed by the United States in February 2012. Deliveries of the Prius PHV in Europe began in late June 2012. The Ford C-Max Energi was released in the U.S. in October 2012, the Volvo V60 Plug-in Hybrid in Sweden by late 2012.

The Honda Accord Plug-in Hybrid was released in selected U.S. markets in January 2013, and the Mitsubishi Outlander PHEV in Japan in January 2013, becoming the first SUV plug-in hybrid in the market. Deliveries of the Ford Fusion Energi began in February 2013. BYD Auto stopped production of its BYD F3DM due to low sales, and its successor, the BYD Qin, began sales in December 2013.

Deliveries to retail customers of the limited edition McLaren P1 supercar began in the UK in October 2013, and the Porsche Panamera S E-Hybrid began deliveries in the U.S. in November 2013. The first retail deliveries of the Cadillac ELR took place in the U.S. in December 2013. The BMW i8 and the limited edition Volkswagen XL1 were released to retail customers in Germany in June 2014. The Porsche 918 Spyder was also released in Europe and the U.S. in 2014. The first units of the Audi A3 Sportback e-tron and Volkswagen Golf GTE were registered in Germany in August 2014.

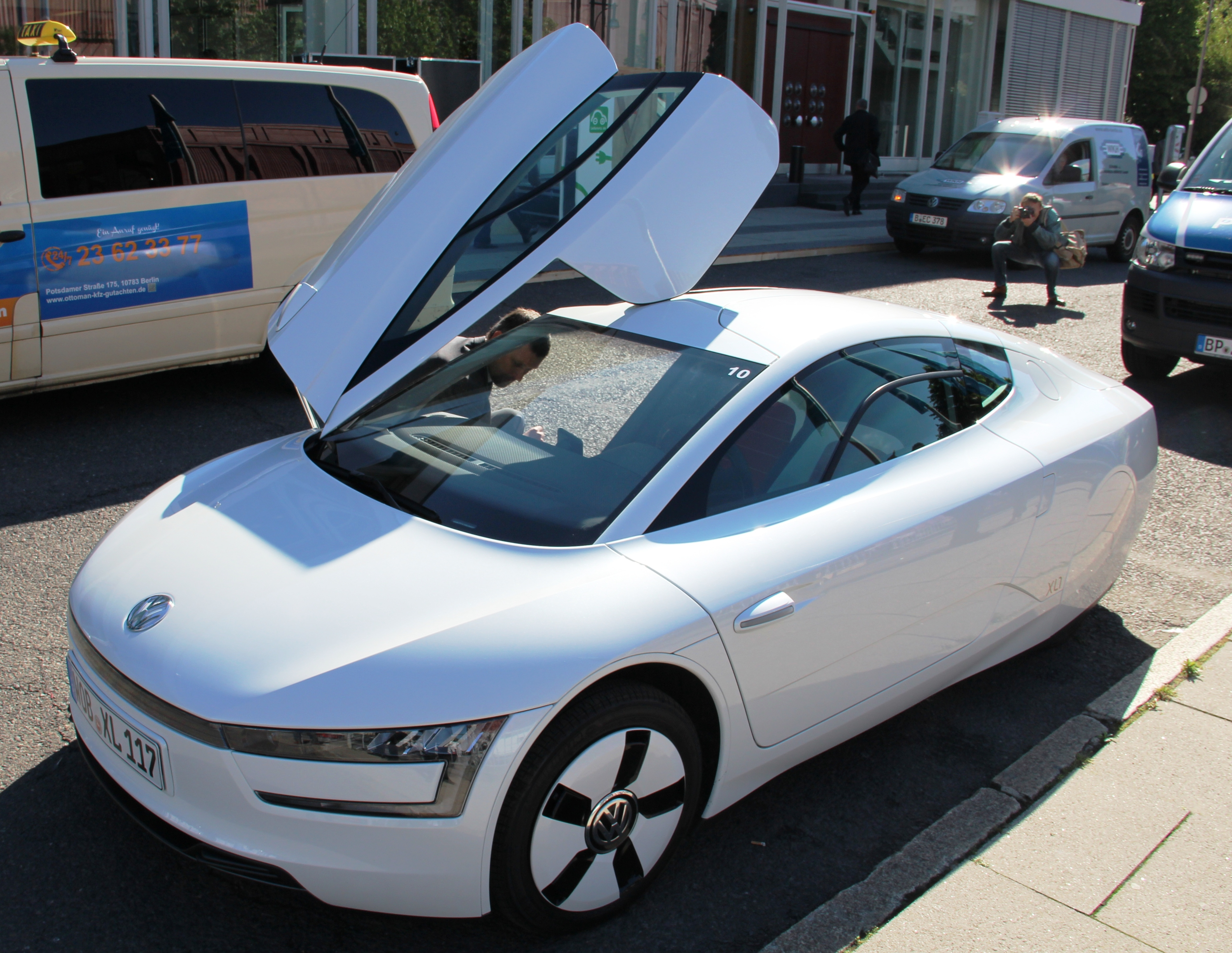
Volkswagen XL1 with passenger-side door opened.

In 2013, Volkswagen began limited production of the Volkswagen XL1, a two-seater diesel-powered plug-in hybrid vehicle designed to travel 100 km/L (280 mpg_{‑imp}; 235 mpg_{‑US}) on diesel, while remaining both roadworthy and practical. The model is unique in that it is one of the few mass-produced plug-in diesel hybrid vehicles and among the few mass-produced diesel hybrids in general.

In December 2014, BMW announced the group is planning to offer plug-in hybrid versions of all its core-brand models using eDrive technology developed for its BMW i brand plug-in vehicles (BMW i3 and BMW i8). The company's goal is to use plug-in technology to continue offering high-performance vehicles while reducing CO_{2} emissions to below 100g/km. The first model available for retail sales will be the 2016 BMW X5 eDrive, with the production version unveiled at the 2015 Shanghai Motor Show. The second generation Chevrolet Volt was unveiled at the January 2015 North American International Auto Show, and retail deliveries began in the U.S. and Canada in October 2015.

In March 2015, Audi said it planned to make a plug-in hybrid version of every model series and expected plug-in hybrids, along with natural gas vehicles and battery-electric drive systems, to make a key contribution to achieving the company's CO_{2} targets. Also in March 2015, Mercedes-Benz announced that the company's main emphasis regarding alternative drives in the next years will be on plug-in hybrids. The carmaker planned to introduce 10 new plug-in hybrid models by 2017. Other plug-in hybrid released in 2015 are the BYD Tang, Volkswagen Passat GTE, Volvo XC90 T8, and the Hyundai Sonata PHEV.

By the end of 2015, over 517,000 highway-legal plug-in hybrid electric cars had been sold worldwide since December 2008, out of total global sales of more than 1.25 million light-duty plug-in electric cars.

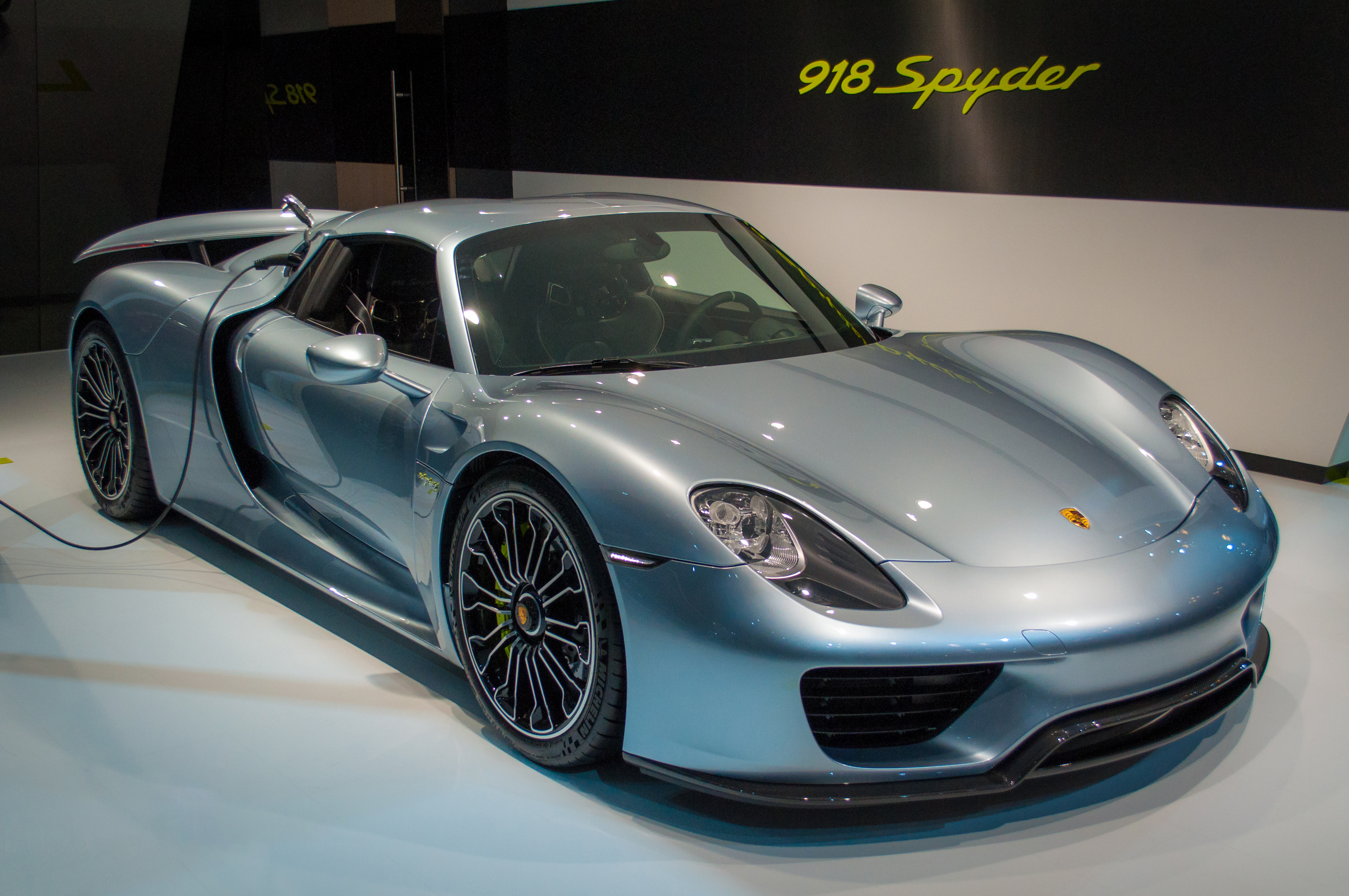
Sales of the Porsche 918 Spyder began in Europe in late 2013.

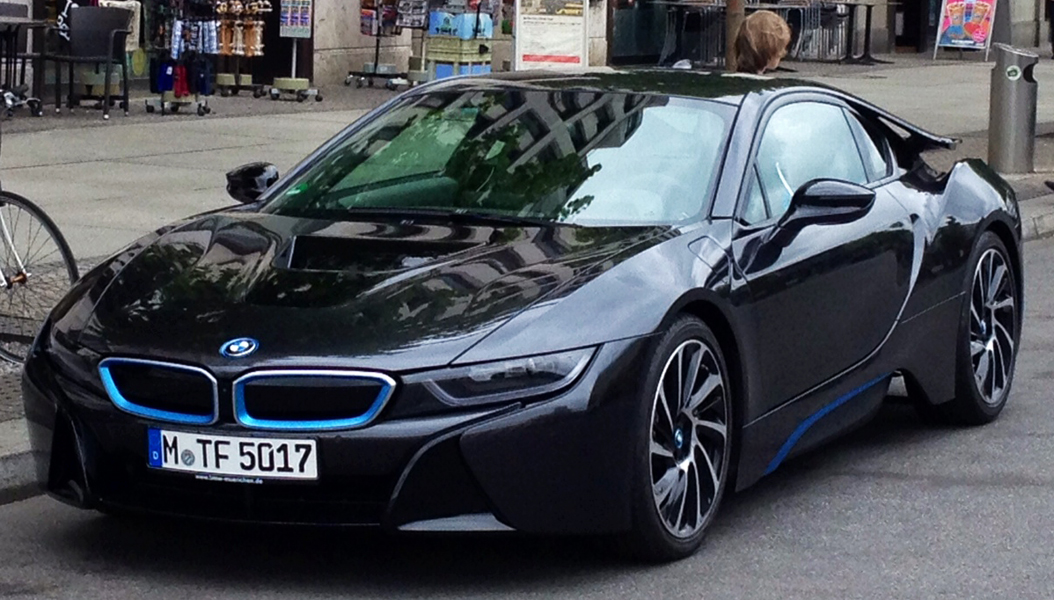
The BMW i8 was released in Europe in June 2014.

Hyundai Motor Company made the official debut of its three model Hyundai Ioniq line-up at the 2016 Geneva Motor Show. The Ioniq family of electric drive vehicles includes the Ioniq Plug-in, which was released in the U.S. in the fourth quarter of 2017.

The second generation Prius plug-in hybrid, called Prius Prime in the U.S. and Prius PHV in Japan, was unveiled at the 2016 New York International Auto Show. Retail deliveries of the Prius Prime began in the U.S. in November 2016. Unlike its predecessor, the Prime runs entirely on electricity in EV mode.

Global sales of the Mitsubishi Outlander PHEV surpassed the 100,000-unit milestone in March 2016.

In January 2016, Chrysler debuted its plug-in hybrid minivan, the Chrysler Pacifica Hybrid. This was the first hybrid minivan of any type in the United States. It was first sold in the United States, Canada, and Mexico in 2017.

In December 2017, Honda began retail deliveries of the Honda Clarity Plug-In Hybrid in the United States and Canada.

In 2019, General Motors ended production of all plug-in hybrid models, including the Chevrolet Volt and the Cadillac CT6 PHEV, as it focuses on battery electric vehicles.

In March 2019, Chinese start-up manufacturer Li Auto introduced its first model, the Li One, a plug-in hybrid vehicle that became the first range-extender electric vehicle from China. It is powered by a 1.2-liter turbocharged petrol engine, used exclusively as a range extender to recharge the battery, and an electric motor. Deliveries started in the fourth quarter of 2019, and by May 2020, deliveries reached 10,000 units. Li Auto went on to became a major plug-in hybrid manufacturer in China, solely producing range extender electric SUVs until 2024 when it introduced its battery electric vehicle.

In May 2019, at the high-performance end, Ferrari introduced the Ferrari SF90 Stradale, a plug-in-hybrid supercar. A 7.9 kWh lithium-ion battery for provides 26 km (16 miles) of electric range and powers three electric motors, adding a combined output of 162 kW (220 PS; 217 hp) to a twin-turbocharged V8 engine rated at a power output of 735 kW (1,000 PS; 986 hp) at 7,500 rpm.

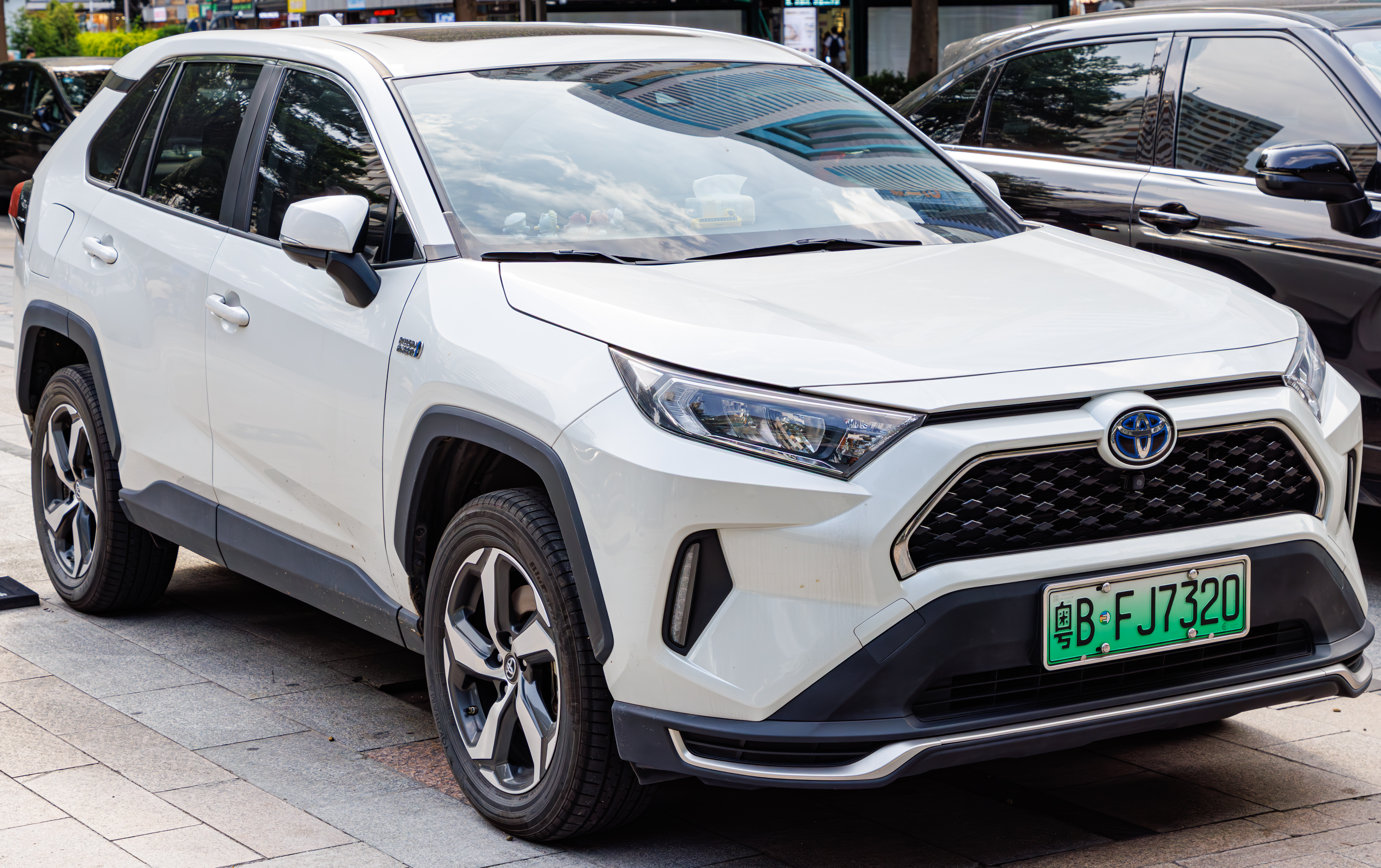
A Toyota RAV4 PHEV seen in China wearing green license plate for plug-in electric vehicles.

In December 2019, Toyota introduced its first plug-in hybrid SUV, the Toyota RAV4 Prime/PHEV. The model has a claimed acceleration of 0–100 km/h (0–62 mph) in 6.2 seconds, which, at the time of its introduction, made it the quickest Toyota model by acceleration after the Toyota GR Supra sports car. It rolled out in certain markets such as Japan, Europe and North America in 2020. Suzuki also markets this model as the Suzuki Across in Europe.

In 2020 and 2021, Hyundai Motor Group started adding new plug-in hybrid vehicles in its line-up, such as the Hyundai Tucson Plug-In Hybrid, Hyundai Santa Fe Plug-In Hybrid, Kia Ceed PHEV, Kia Sportage PHEV, and Kia Sorento PHEV. These models are offered mainly for Europe and, in addition, North America.

In June 2020, BYD Auto introduced a petrol engine dedicated solely for plug-in hybrid application called the Xiaoyun. The 1.5-liter engine is designed specifically for its newly introduced DM-i plug-in hybrid technology. The engine uses the Atkinson cycle and has a thermal efficiency of up to 43%, which was among the highest for mass-produced petrol engines globally. The DM-i system itself adopts a complex "electric-based" series-parallel architecture. BYD also emphasized that vehicles equipped with this technology will be priced competitively with petrol-powered vehicles. The DM-i became a vital technology for BYD as it ended production of traditional petrol-powered vehicles in 2022.

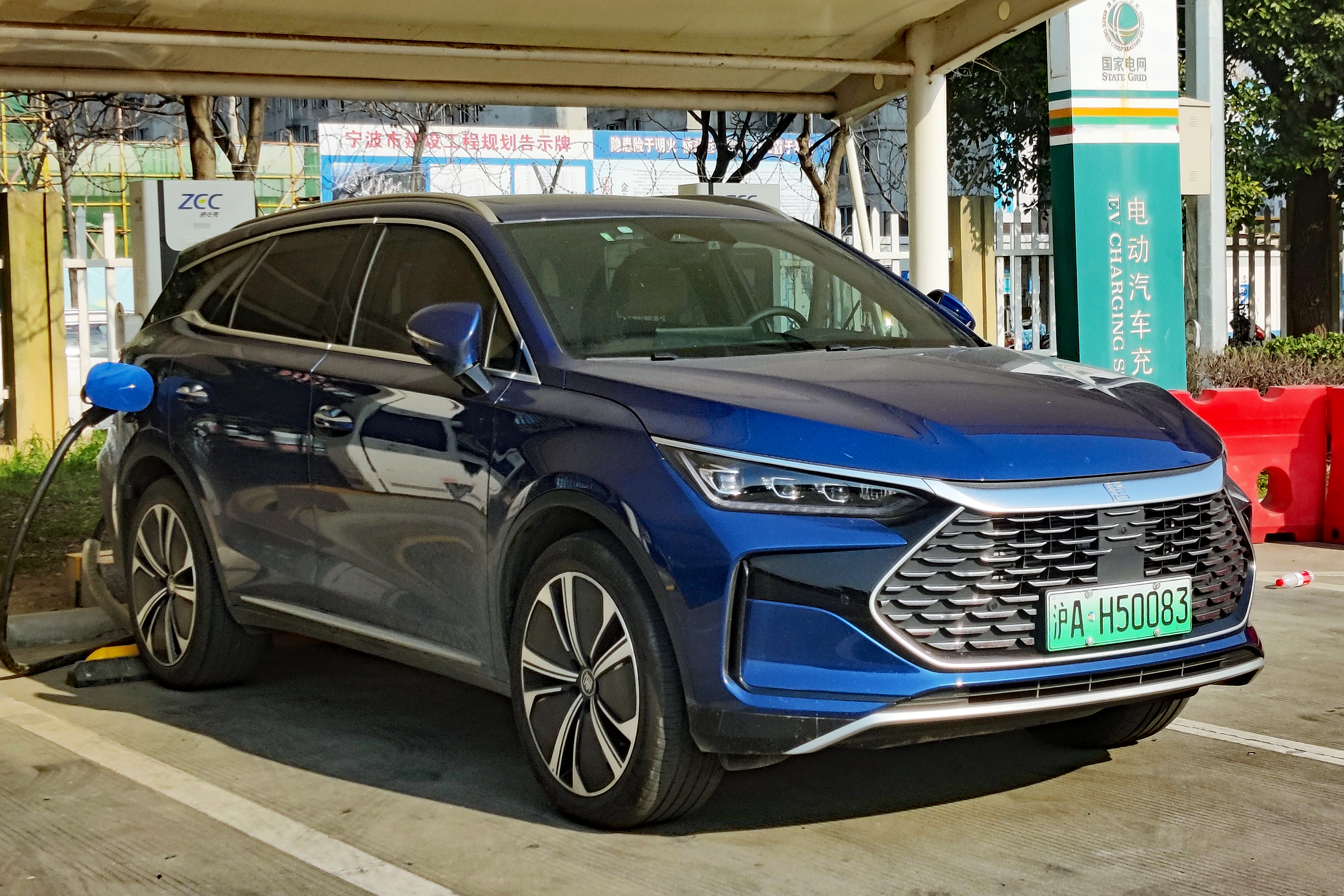
A BYD Tang DM-p in a charging station.

In 2021, BYD began introducing its new plug-in hybrid systems, DM-i and DM-p, across its vehicle lineup, including sedans, SUVs, and a minivan, and the move was met with strong market feedback in China. These systems are more affordable and efficient than previous generations, and their popularity has been further boosted by local license plate policies that favor plug-in hybrids and battery-electric vehicles. As a result, demand surged rapidly, leading to slower delivery times. By 2022, BYD accounted for over 35% of global plug-in hybrid vehicle production.

In North America, Stellantis began sales of the Jeep Wrangler 4xe in 2021. It is the plug-in hybrid version of the JL Wrangler that offers around 35 km (22 mi) pure electric range. It became the best-selling plug-in hybrid in the United States in 2022, outselling the Toyota RAV4 Prime.

In October 2021, Mitsubishi Motors introduced a new generation of the Mitsubishi Outlander PHEV. Initially debuting in Japan, the model it retains the 4B12 engine used by the previous generation Outlander PHEV, coupled with a more powerful motor and a larger 20 kWh battery. With rear-motor improvements, the Outlander PHEV can seat 7 people.

Honda discontinued its only plug-in hybrid model in markets outside China, the Honda Clarity Plug-In Hybrid, in 2021.

The Mazda CX-60 PHEV, Mazda's first plug-in hybrid, went on sale in early 2022, initially for the European market. The same plug-in hybrid powertrain was later adopted by the larger Mazda CX-80 and CX-90.

In April 2024, BYD Auto launched the DM-i 5.0, its fifth-generation plug-in hybrid technology on the BYD Qin L DM-i and BYD Seal 06 DM-i. BYD claims, the system brought improved efficiency with 46.06% thermal efficiency, fuel consumption of 2.9 L/100 km (34 km/l; 81 mpg_{‑US}), and a maximum range of 2,100 km (1,300 mi). According to the International Energy Agency, plug-in hybrid sales in China grew faster than battery electric vehicles through early 2024, and all plug-in electric vehicles reached over 40% retail share in March. By year-end, China accounted for 3 out of 4 of global plug-in sales.

In October 2024, Geely released the Leishen EM-i plug-in hybrid system, also known as the NordThor 2.0, which directly competes with BYD's technology. While it is not Geely's first plug-in hybrid system, the EM-i is claimed to have the world's highest thermal efficiency at 46.5%, and outperforms BYD's DM-i 5.0 system with combined range of 2,390 km (1,490 mi) and a fuel consumption of 2.67 L/100 km (37.5 km/l; 88 mpg_{‑US}). BYD and Geely representatives had a public argument regarding which system has the higher thermal efficiency.

Nissan released its first-ever plug-in hybrid vehicle in April 2025, the Nissan Frontier Pro pickup truck. It is co-developed with Zhengzhou Nissan. It was followed by the Nissan N6 sedan in August 2025, co-developed with Dongfeng Nissan. These models are developed and produced in China with plans for global market release.

On February 23, 2026, Chery revealed the Chery Stockman (known as the Chery KP31 before the launch), which will become the first ever diesel plug-in hybrid pickup truck. It is set to enter production and launch in Q4 2026, with Australia being its first market. A near-production version was unveiled at a press event on the same day in Sydney, Australia.

== Technology ==
=== Powertrains ===
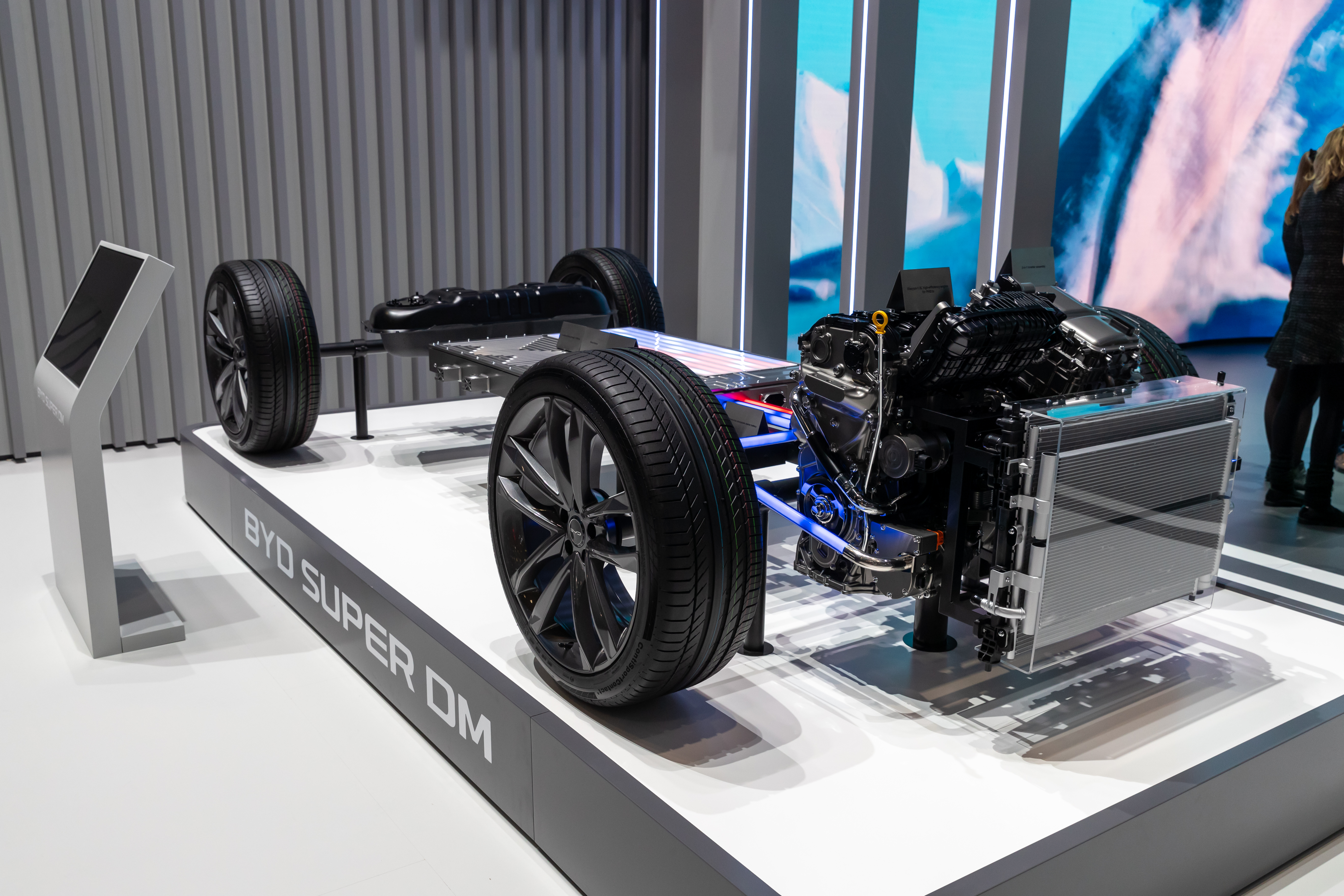
BYD DM plug-in hybrid system on display

PHEVs are based on the same three basic powertrain architectures of conventional hybrids; a series hybrid is propelled by electric motors only, a parallel hybrid is propelled both by its internal combustion engine and by electric motors operating concurrently, and a series-parallel hybrid operates in either mode. While a plain hybrid vehicle charges its battery solely from its engine, a plug-in hybrid can obtain a significant portion of the energy required to recharge its battery from external sources.

==== Dual plug-in hybrids ====
These contain two different energy recovery systems.

The Mercedes-AMG ONE is a plug-in dual hybrid.

The Mercedes-Benz C-Class (W206) and the Mercedes C254/X254 also have an electrically assisted turbocharger/MGU-H.

==== Fuel cell plug-in hybrid ====
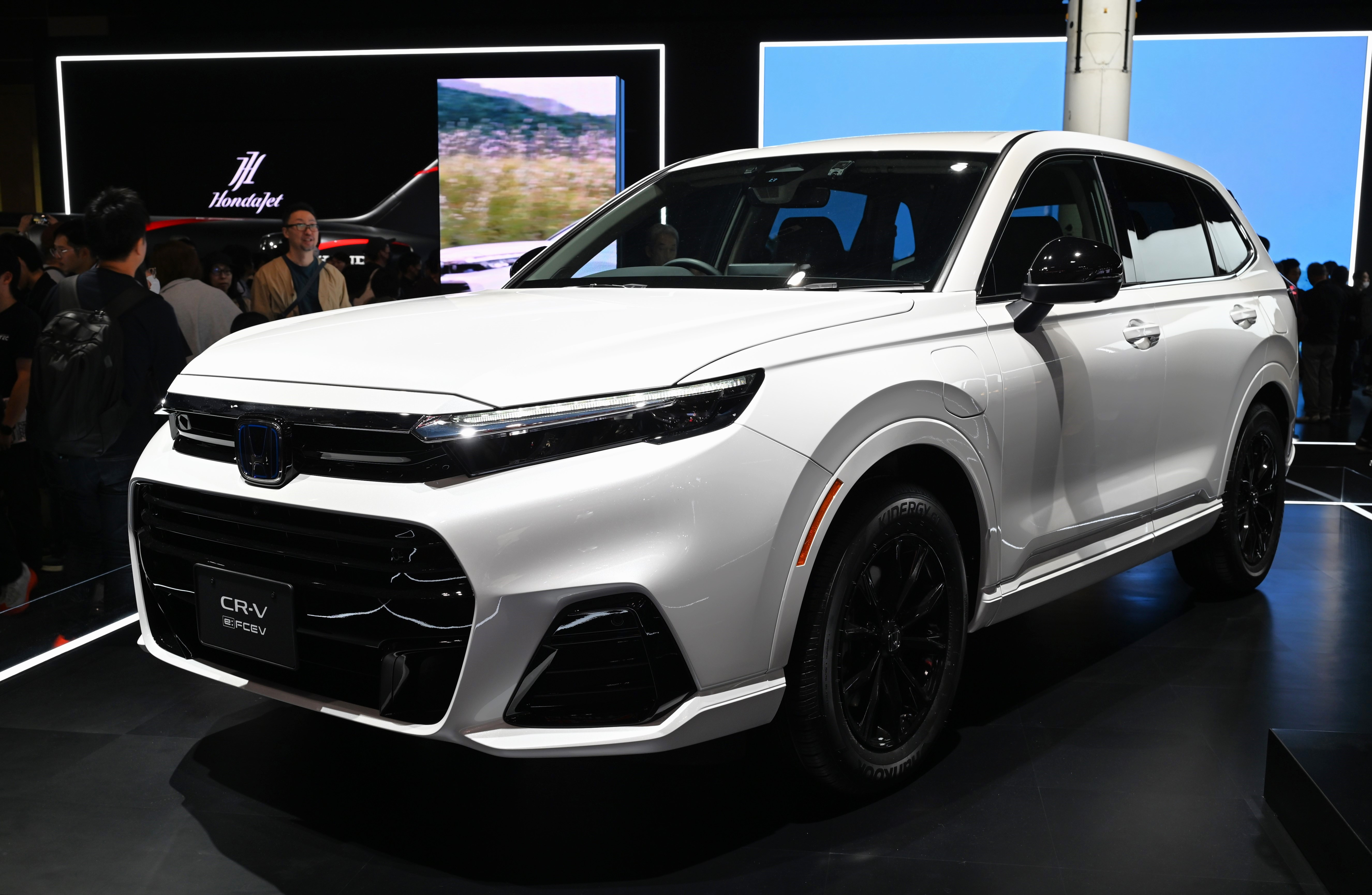
The Honda CR-V e:FCEV is a plug-in hybrid that pairs a battery, an electric motor, a hydrogen tank, and a fuel cell.

The Honda CR-V e:FCEV is a plug-in hybrid electric, fuel cell vehicle. It is equipped with a front-mounted electric motor, two high-pressure hydrogen tanks with a total capacity of 4.3 kg (9.5 lb), a 17.7 kWh battery with plug-in charging capability, and no internal combustion engine.

=== Charging systems ===
The battery charger can be on-board or external to the vehicle. The process for an on-board charger is best described as converting AC power to DC power, thereby charging the battery. On-board chargers are limited in capacity by their weight and size, and by the limited capacity of general-purpose AC outlets. Dedicated off-board chargers can be as large and powerful as the user can afford, but require the vehicle to return to the charger; high-speed chargers may be shared by multiple vehicles.

Using the electric motor's inverter allows the motor windings to act as the transformer coils, with the existing high-power inverter serving as the AC-to-DC charger. As these components are already required in the car and are designed to handle practical power levels, they can be used to create a very powerful on-board charger with no significant additional weight or size. AC Propulsion uses this charging method, referred to as "reductive charging".

=== Modes of operation ===
A plug-in hybrid operates in charge-depleting and charge-sustaining modes. Combinations of these two modes are termed blended mode or mixed-mode. These vehicles can be designed to drive for an extended range in all-electric mode, either at low speeds only or at all speeds. These modes manage the vehicle's battery discharge strategy, and their use has a direct effect on the size and type of battery required:

Charge-depleting mode allows a fully charged PHEV to operate exclusively (or, depending on the vehicle, almost exclusively, except during hard acceleration) on electric power until its battery state of charge is depleted to a predetermined level, at which time the vehicle's internal combustion engine or fuel cell will be engaged. This period is the vehicle's all-electric range. This is the only mode that a battery electric vehicle can operate in, hence their limited range.

Mixed mode describes a trip using a combination of multiple modes. For example, a car may begin a trip in low-speed charge-depleting mode, then enter onto a freeway and operate in blended mode. The driver might exit the freeway and drive without the internal combustion engine until the all-electric range is exhausted. The vehicle can revert to a charge-sustaining mode until the final destination is reached. This contrasts with a charge-depleting trip that would be driven within the limits of a PHEV's all-electric range.

Most PHEVs also have two additional charge-sustaining modes:

Battery hold; the electric motor is locked out, and the vehicle operates exclusively on combustion power, so that whatever charge is left in the battery remains for when mixed mode or full electric operation are re-engaged, whilst regenerative braking will still be available to boost the battery charge. On some PHEVs, vehicle services that use the traction battery (such as heating and air conditioning) are placed in a low-power-consumption mode to conserve the remaining battery charge further. The electric motor's lockout is automatically overridden (when charging permits) if full acceleration is required.

Self charge; the electric motor's armature is engaged to the transmission, but is connected to the battery so that it runs as a generator and therefore recharges the battery whilst the car is in motion. However, this comes at the expense of higher fuel consumption, as the combustion engine must both power the vehicle and charge the battery. This is useful for 'charging on the move' when there are limited places to plug the vehicle in.

=== Electric power storage ===
The optimum battery size varies depending on whether the aim is to reduce fuel consumption, running costs, or emissions, but a 2009 study concluded that "The best choice of PHEV battery capacity depends critically on the distance that the vehicle will be driven between charges. Our results suggest that for urban driving conditions and frequent charges every 10 miles or less, a low-capacity PHEV sized with an AER (all-electric range) of about 7 miles would be a robust choice for minimizing gasoline consumption, cost, and greenhouse gas emissions. For less frequent charging, every 20–100 miles, PHEVs release fewer GHGs, but HEVs are more cost effective."

PHEVs typically require deeper battery charging and discharging cycles than conventional hybrids. Because the number of full cycles affects battery life, this may be lower than in traditional HEVs, which do not fully deplete their batteries. Nonetheless, some authors argue that PHEVs will soon become standard in the automobile industry. Design issues and trade-offs against battery life, capacity, heat dissipation, weight, costs, and safety need to be solved. Advanced battery technology is under development, promising greater energy densities by both mass and volume, and battery life expectancy is expected to increase.

The cathodes of some early-2007 lithium-ion batteries are made of lithium–cobalt oxide. This material is expensive, and cells made with it can release oxygen if overcharged. If the cobalt is replaced with iron phosphates, the cells will not burn or release oxygen under any charge. At early 2007 gasoline and electricity prices, the break-even point is reached after six to ten years of operation. The payback period may be longer for plug-in hybrids because of their larger, more expensive batteries.

Nickel–metal hydride and lithium-ion batteries can be recycled; Toyota, for example, has a recycling program in place under which dealers are paid a US$200 credit for each battery returned. Plug-in hybrids typically use larger battery packs than comparable conventional hybrids, however, and thus require more resources. Pacific Gas and Electric Company (PG&E) has suggested that utilities could purchase used batteries for backup and load leveling purposes. They state that while these used batteries may no longer be usable in vehicles, their residual capacity still has significant value. More recently, General Motors (GM) has said it has been "approached by utilities interested in using recycled Volt batteries as a power storage system, a secondary market that could bring down the cost of the Volt and other plug-in vehicles for consumers".

Ultracapacitors (or "supercapacitors") are used in some plug-in hybrids, such as AFS Trinity's concept prototype, to store energy for rapid release, leveraging their high power density, keeping batteries within safe resistive-heating limits, and extending battery life. The CSIRO's UltraBattery combines a supercapacitor and a lead–acid battery in a single unit, creating a hybrid car battery that lasts longer, costs less and is more powerful than current technologies used in plug-in hybrid electric vehicles (PHEVs).

=== Conversions of production vehicles ===
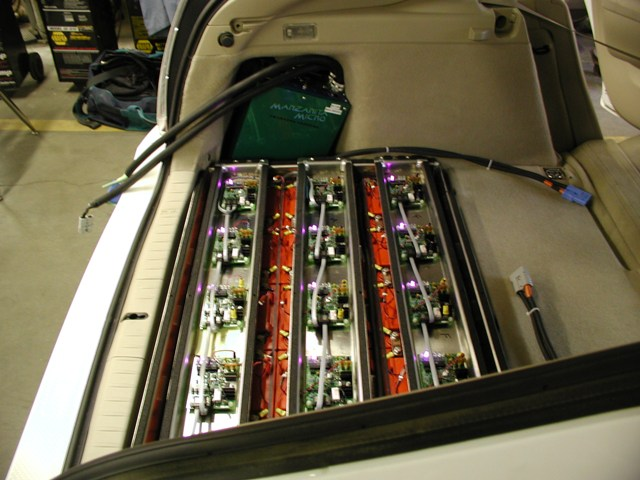
15 lead–acid batteries, PFC charger, and regulators installed into WhiteBird, a PHEV conversion of a Toyota Prius

Several companies are converting fossil fuel non-hybrid vehicles to plug-in hybrids:

Aftermarket conversion of an existing production hybrid to a plug-in hybrid typically involves increasing the capacity of the vehicle's battery pack and adding an on-board AC-to-DC charger. Ideally, the vehicle's powertrain software would be reprogrammed to fully utilize the battery pack's additional energy storage capacity and power output.

Many early plug-in hybrid electric vehicle conversions have been based on the Toyota Prius. Some of the systems have involved the replacement of the vehicle's original NiMH battery pack and its electronic control unit. Others add a battery pack to the original.

== Target market ==
In recent years, demand for all-electric vehicles, especially in the United States market, has been driven by government incentives, including subsidies and tax credits. In particular, American sales of the Nissan Leaf have depended on generous incentives and special treatment in the state of Georgia, the top selling Leaf market. According to international market research, 60% of respondents believe a battery driving range of less than 160 km (99 mi) is unacceptable even though only 2% drive more than that distance per day. Among popular current all-electric vehicles, only the Tesla (with the most expensive version of the Model S offering a 265 miles (426 km) range in the U.S. Environmental Protection Agency 5-cycle test) significantly exceeds this threshold. In 2021, for the 2022 model year, the Nissan Leaf has an EPA-rated range of 212 miles (341 km) for the 60 kWh model.

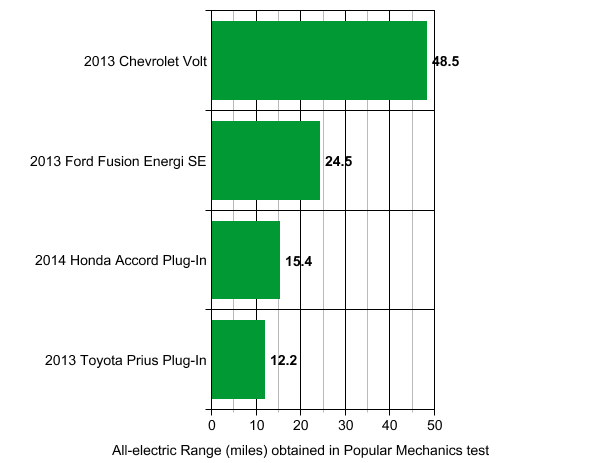
All-electric range, in miles, for several popular model year 2013 plug-in hybrids, as observed in testing by Popular Mechanics magazine. Providing greater all-electric range adds cost and entails compromises, so different all-electric ranges may suit different customers' needs.

Plug-in hybrids provide the extended range and refueling capability of conventional hybrids while enabling drivers to use battery-electric power for at least a significant portion of their typical daily driving. The average trip to or from work in the United States in 2009 was 11.8 miles (19.0 km), while the average distance commuted to work in England and Wales in 2011 was slightly lower at 9.3 miles (15 km). Since building a PHEV with a longer all-electric range adds weight and cost, and reduces cargo and/or passenger space, there is not a specific all-electric range that is optimal. The accompanying graph shows the observed all-electric range (in miles) for four popular U.S. market plug-in hybrids, as tested by Popular Mechanics magazine.

A key design parameter of the Chevrolet Volt was a target of 40 miles (64 km) for the all-electric range, selected to keep the battery size small and lower costs, and mainly because research showed that 78% of daily commuters in the U.S. travel 40 mi (64 km) or less. This target range would allow most travel to be accomplished with electric propulsion, and it was assumed that charging would occur overnight at home. This requirement translates to using a lithium-ion battery pack with an energy storage capacity of 16 kWh, assuming the battery is used until its state of charge (SOC) reaches 30%.

In October 2014, General Motors reported, based on data collected through its OnStar telematics system since Volt deliveries began, and with over 1 billion miles (1.6 billion km) traveled, that Volt owners drive about 62.5% of their trips in all-electric mode. In May 2016, Ford reported, based on data collected from more than 610 million miles (976 million km) logged by its electrified vehicles through its telematics system, that drivers of these vehicles run an average of 13,500 mi (21,700 km) annually on their vehicles, with about half of those miles operating in all-electric mode. A breakdown of these figures shows an average daily commute of 42 mi (68 km) for Ford Energi plug-in hybrid drivers. Ford notes that with the enhanced electric range of the 2017 model year, the average Fusion Energi commuter could go the entire day using no gasoline if the car is fully charged both before leaving for work and before leaving for home. According to Ford data, most customers currently charge their vehicles only at home.

The 2015 edition of the EPA's annual report "Light-Duty Automotive Technology, Carbon Dioxide Emissions, and Fuel Economy Trends" estimates the following utility factors for 2015 model year plug-in hybrids to represent the percentage of miles that will be driven using electricity by an average driver, whether in electric only or blended modes: 83% for the BMW i3 REx, 66% for the Chevrolet Volt, 45% for the Ford Energi models, 43% for the McLaren P1, 37% for the BMW i8, and 29% for the Toyota Prius PHV. A 2014 analysis conducted by the Idaho National Laboratory using a sample of 21,600 all-electric cars and plug-in hybrids, found that Volt owners traveled on average 9,112 miles in all-electric mode (e-miles) per year, while Leaf owners traveled 9,697 e-miles per year, despite the Volt's shorter all-electric range, about half of the Leaf's.

== Comparison to non-plug-in hybrids ==
=== Fuel efficiency and petroleum displacement ===
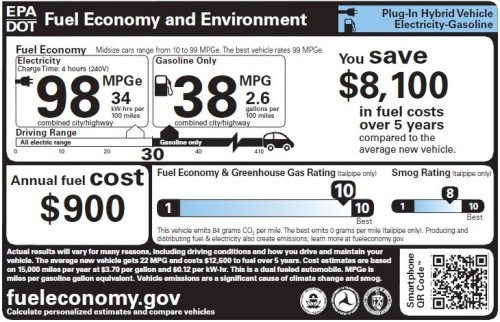
Typical fuel economy label for series plug-in hybrid or extended range electric vehicle

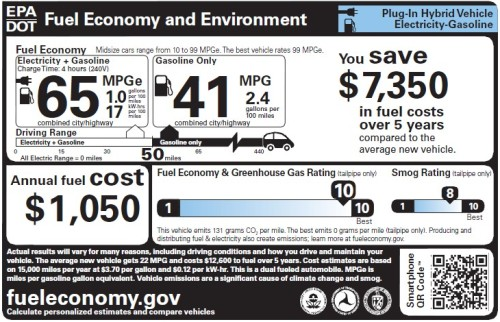
Typical fuel economy label for blended or series-parallel plug-in hybrid

Plug-in hybrids have the potential to be even more efficient than conventional hybrids because their internal combustion engine is used less often, allowing it to operate closer to its maximum efficiency. While a Toyota Prius is likely to convert fuel to motive energy on average at about 30% efficiency (well below the engine's 38% peak efficiency), the engine of a PHEV with 70 km (43 mi) of electric range would be likely to operate far more often near its peak efficiency because the batteries can serve the modest power needs at times when the combustion engine would be forced to run well below its peak efficiency. The actual efficiency achieved depends on losses from electricity generation, inversion, battery charging/discharging, the motor controller and motor itself, the way a vehicle is used (its duty cycle), and the opportunities to recharge by connecting to the electrical grid.

Each kilowatt hour of battery capacity in use will displace up to 50 U.S. gallons (190 L; 42 imp gal) of petroleum fuels per year (gasoline or diesel). Also, electricity is multi-sourced and, as a result, it gives the greatest degree of energy resilience.

The actual fuel economy for PHEVs depends on their powertrain's operating modes, the all-electric range, and the amount of driving between charges. If no gasoline is used, the miles per gallon gasoline equivalent (MPG-e) depends only on the efficiency of the electric system. The first mass production PHEV available in the U.S. market, the 2011 Chevrolet Volt, with an EPA rated all-electric range of 35 mi (56 km) and an additional gasoline-only extended range of 344 mi (554 km), has an EPA combined city/highway fuel economy of 93 MPG-e in all-electric mode, and 37 mpg_{‑US} (6.4 L/100 km; 44 mpg_{‑imp}) in gasoline-only mode, for an overall combined gas-electric fuel economy rating of 60 mpg_{‑US} (3.9 L/100 km; 72 mpg_{‑imp}) equivalent (MPG-e). The EPA also included in the Volt's fuel economy label a table showing fuel economy and electricity consumed for five different scenarios: 30, 45, 60 and 75 mi (121 km) driven between a full charge, and a never charge scenario. According to this table the fuel economy goes up to 168 mpg_{‑US} (1.40 L/100 km; 202 mpg_{‑imp}) equivalent (MPG-e) with 45 mi (72 km) driven between full charges.

For the more comprehensive fuel economy and environment label that will be mandatory in the U.S. beginning in model year 2013, the National Highway Traffic Safety Administration (NHTSA) and Environmental Protection Agency (EPA) issued two separate fuel economy labels for plug-in hybrids because of their design complexity, as PHEVS can operate in two or three operating modes: all-electric, blended, and gasoline-only. One label is for series hybrid or extended range electric vehicle (like the Chevy Volt), with all-electric and gasoline-only modes; and a second label for blended mode or series-parallel hybrid, that includes a combination of both gasoline and plug-in electric operation; and gasoline only, like a conventional hybrid vehicle.

The Society of Automotive Engineers (SAE) developed its recommended practice in 1999 for testing and reporting the fuel economy of hybrid vehicles and included language to address PHEVs. An SAE committee is currently working to review procedures for testing and reporting the fuel economy of PHEVs. The Toronto Atmospheric Fund tested ten retrofitted plug-in hybrid vehicles that achieved an average of 5.8 litres per 100 kilometres or 40.6 miles per gallon over six months in 2008, which was considered below the technology's potential.

In real-world testing using normal drivers, some Prius PHEV conversions may not achieve much better fuel economy than HEVs. For example, a plug-in Prius fleet, each with a 30 miles (48 km) all-electric range, averaged only 51 mpg_{‑US} (4.6 L/100 km; 61 mpg_{‑imp}) in a 17,000-mile (27,000 km) test in Seattle, and similar results with the same kind of conversion battery models at Google's RechargeIT initiative. Moreover, the additional battery pack costs US$10,000–US$11,000.

=== Operating costs ===
A study published in 2014 by researchers from Lamar University, Iowa State University and Oak Ridge National Laboratory compared the operating costs of PHEVs of various electric ranges (10, 20, 30, and 40 miles) with conventional gasoline vehicles and non-plugin hybrid-electric vehicles (HEVs) for different payback periods, considering different charging infrastructure deployment levels and gasoline prices. The study concluded that:

- PHEVs save around 60% or 40% in energy costs, compared with conventional gasoline vehicles and HEVs, respectively. For drivers with significant daily vehicle miles traveled (DVMT), however, hybrid vehicles may be an even better choice than plug-in hybrids with a 40 mi (64 km) range, particularly when public charging infrastructure is lacking.
- The incremental battery cost of large-battery plug-in hybrids is difficult to justify based on the incremental savings of PHEVs' operating costs unless a subsidy is offered for large-battery PHEVs.
- When the price of gasoline increases from US$4 per gallon to US$5 per gallon, the number of drivers who benefit from a larger battery increases significantly. If the gas price is US$3, a plug-in hybrid with a range of 10 mi (16 km) is the least-cost option, even if the battery costs $200/kWh.
- Although quick chargers can reduce charging time, they contribute little to energy cost savings for PHEVs, as opposed to Level-2 chargers.

=== Cost of batteries ===
Disadvantages of PHEVs include the additional cost, weight, and size of a larger battery pack. According to a 2010 study by the National Research Council, the cost of a lithium-ion battery pack was about US$1,700/kW·h of usable energy. A 2013 study by the American Council for an Energy-Efficient Economy reported that battery costs had fallen from US$1,300 per kilowatt-hour in 2007 to US$500 per kilowatt-hour in 2012.

By 2024, lithium-ion battery pack prices dropped sharply to US$115 per kilowatt-hour, marking a 20% annual decline and the steepest price reduction since 2017. According to BloombergNEF's 2025 battery price survey, average pack prices fell further to US$108 per kilowatt-hour, driven by continued cell manufacturing overcapacity, intense competition, and the ongoing shift to lower-cost lithium iron phosphate (LFP) batteries. Industry forecasts predict costs reaching below US$100 per kilowatt-hour in 2026 and US$69 per kilowatt-hour by 2030.

However, PHEV battery packs cost significantly more per kilowatt-hour than battery electric vehicle packs due to their smaller size and higher power requirements. According to the International Energy Agency's Global EV Outlook 2025, a typical 20 kWh PHEV battery pack costs roughly the same as a standard 65 kWh BEV pack despite the substantial capacity difference. With battery supplies still constrained, some automakers have adopted different electrification strategies. Toyota has argued that limited battery resources are better deployed across multiple hybrid electric vehicles rather than concentrated in fewer plug-in hybrids or battery electric vehicles. According to Toyota's analysis, with the same battery resources, producing multiple conventional hybrids, each cutting emissions by approximately 30% can collectively reduce more carbon and fuel consumption than a single plug-in hybrid or battery electric vehicle. This approach has proven commercially successful in markets where charging infrastructure remains limited or consumer adoption of fully electric vehicles faces resistance.

Cost comparison between current PHEV models in the U.S. (prices for 2026)
Model	EV range	Price premium over base hybrid	Estimated battery pack cost^{(1)}	Annual fuel cost (electric + gasoline)^{(2)}	Annual fuel cost (hybrid only)	Annual fuel savings
Toyota RAV4 PHEV SE	84 km	US$9,600	US$2,500–US$2,900^{(3)}	US$1,000–US$1,500	US$1,800	US$300–US$800
Hyundai Tucson PHEV	53 km	US$10,650	US$1,700–US$2,000^{(3)}	US$1,200–US$1,600	US$1,950	US$350–US$750
Notes: (1) Pack-level costs averaged US$108/kWh in 2025 but PHEV packs cost approximately 3× more per kWh than BEV packs due to higher power requirements (2) Assuming 24,000 km (15,000 miles) per year, US$0.18/kWh electricity, US$3.50/gallon gasoline, 60% electric driving for daily use (3) RAV4 PHEV uses 22.7 kWh battery; Tucson PHEV uses 13.8 kWh battery

According to a March 2026 analysis by Consumer Reports in the U.S., PHEVs are unlikely to save most drivers money during the first few years of ownership without significant government incentives, particularly following the expiration of the US$7,500 federal tax credit in September 2025. The analysis found that regional variations in electricity and gasoline prices significantly affect PHEV economics, with states having high gasoline prices and relatively low electricity costs, such as Washington, offering the shortest payback periods. Conversely, in states with lower gasoline prices and higher electricity costs, such as Massachusetts, a PHEV might never become cheaper to operate than a conventional gasoline vehicle.

A 2026 study published in Environmental Research Letters by researchers at the University of Michigan found that while new PHEVs generally have higher total cost of ownership than conventional vehicles over five years, the picture changes significantly in the used vehicle market. The study noted that PHEVs typically retain more value than conventional vehicles for the first several years, though this advantage eventually disappears. Break-even analysis in 2026 suggests that for the average American buyer purchasing a new PHEV, the break-even point against a comparable gasoline vehicle typically occurs in the sixth year of ownership, assuming 15,000 miles driven annually and primarily home charging.

Maintenance cost analyses show that PHEVs driven primarily on electric power can achieve approximately half the maintenance and repair costs of conventional gasoline vehicles over their lifetime, about US$0.03 per mile compared to US$0.06 per mile, due to reduced wear on engine components, regenerative braking extending brake life, and fewer oil changes. However, these savings are highly dependent on charging behavior, with PHEVs driven primarily on gasoline showing maintenance costs similar to conventional hybrid vehicles.

Earlier assessments painted a more pessimistic picture. According to a 2010 study by the National Research Council, the estimated manufacturer cost of the battery pack for a PHEV with 10 km (6.2 mi) of electric range was around US$3,000, rising to US$14,000 for a PHEV with 40 km (25 mi) of electric range, when battery costs averaged US$1,700/kWh. The study concluded that lifetime fuel savings would not offset plug-ins' high upfront costs for decades, and that hundreds of billions of dollars in government subsidies would be required to achieve rapid market penetration in the United States.

A 2011 study by the Belfer Center at Harvard University found similar results, concluding that PHEV gasoline cost savings did not offset higher purchase prices when comparing lifetime net present value at 2010 costs, with a PHEV-40 costing US$5,377 more than a conventional vehicle. The study projected that with declining battery costs and rising gasoline prices, BEVs would become significantly less expensive than conventional cars, while PHEVs would remain more expensive than BEVs in most scenarios due to their more complicated powertrains.

==== Battery types ====
The dominance of lower-cost lithium iron phosphate (LFP) batteries has transformed the PHEV battery market, particularly with Chinese manufacturers leading production. By 2025, LFP batteries comprised nearly half of the global electric vehicle battery market, with average LFP pack prices across all segments reaching US$81 per kilowatt-hour compared to US$128 per kilowatt-hour for nickel manganese cobalt oxide (NMC) packs. LFP batteries avoids expensive and controversial metals like cobalt and nickel, while offering superior thermal stability and longer cycle life exceeding 3,000 charge cycles. NMC batteries, using a blend of nickel, manganese, and cobalt, provide higher energy density and longer driving ranges but at increased cost and with greater sensitivity to thermal runaway. China's dominance in battery production has created significant cost advantages, with average battery pack prices in China reaching US$84 per kilowatt-hour in 2025, compared to US$144 per kilowatt-hour in North America and US$123 per kilowatt-hour in Europe.

=== Emissions shifted to electric plants ===
Increased pollution is expected to occur in some areas with the adoption of PHEVs, but most areas will experience a decrease. A study by the ACEEE predicts that widespread PHEV use in heavily coal-dependent areas would increase local net sulfur dioxide and mercury emissions, given emissions levels from most coal plants currently supplying power to the grid. Although clean coal technologies could create power plants that supply grid power from coal without emitting significant amounts of such pollutants, the higher cost of the application of these technologies may increase the price of coal-generated electricity. The net effect on pollution is dependent on the fuel source of the electrical grid (fossil or renewable, for example) and the pollution profile of the power plants themselves. Identifying, regulating, and upgrading a single point pollution source, such as a power plant—or replacing a plant altogether—may also be more practical. From a human health perspective, shifting pollution away from large urban areas may be considered a significant advantage.

According to a 2009 study by the National Academy of Science, "Electric vehicles and grid-dependent (plug-in) hybrid vehicles showed somewhat higher nonclimate damages than many other technologies." Efficiency of plug-in hybrids is also impacted by the overall efficiency of electric power transmission. Transmission and distribution losses in the USA were estimated at 7.2% in 1995 and 6.5% in 2007. By life cycle analysis of air pollution emissions, natural gas vehicles are currently the lowest emitter.

== Greenhouse gas emissions ==
The effect of PHEVs on greenhouse emissions is complex. Plug-in hybrid vehicles operating in all-electric mode do not emit harmful tailpipe pollutants from the onboard source of power. The clean-air benefit is usually local because, depending on the source of the electricity used to recharge the batteries, air-pollutant emissions are shifted to the location of the generation plants. In the same way, PHEVs do not emit greenhouse gases from the onboard source of power, but from the point of view of a well-to-wheel assessment, the extent of the benefit also depends on the fuel and technology used for electricity generation. From the perspective of a full life cycle analysis, the electricity used to recharge the batteries must be generated from zero-emission sources such as renewable (e.g. wind power, solar energy or hydroelectricity) or nuclear power for PEVs to have almost none or zero well-to-wheel emissions. On the other hand, when PEVs are recharged from coal-fired plants, they usually produce slightly more greenhouse gas emissions than internal combustion engine vehicles. In the case of plug-in hybrid electric vehicles, when operating in hybrid mode with assistance of the internal combustion engine, tailpipe and greenhouse emissions are lower in comparison to conventional cars because of their higher fuel economy.

== Life cycle energy and emissions assessments ==
=== Argonne ===
In 2009, researchers at Argonne National Laboratory adapted their GREET model to conduct a full well-to-wheels (WTW) analysis of energy use and greenhouse gas (GHG) emissions of plug-in hybrid electric vehicles for several scenarios, considering different on-board fuels and different sources of electricity generation for recharging the vehicle batteries. Three US regions were selected for the analysis: California, New York, and Illinois, as these regions include major metropolitan areas with significant variations in their energy generation mixes. The full cycle analysis results were also reported for the US generation mix and renewable electricity to examine cases of average and clean mixes, respectively This 2009 study showed a wide spread of petroleum use and GHG emissions among the different fuel production technologies and grid generation mixes. The following table summarizes the main results:

PHEV well-to-wheels Petroleum energy use and greenhouse gas emissions for an all-electric range between 10 and 40 miles (16 and 64 km) with different on-board fuels.^{(1)} (as a % relative to an internal combustion engine vehicle that uses fossil fuel gasoline)
Analysis	Reformulated gasoline and ultra-low-sulfur diesel	E85 fuel from corn and switchgrass	Fuel cell hydrogen
Petroleum energy use reduction	40–60%	70–90%	more than 90%
GHG emissions reduction^{(2)}	30–60%	40–80%	10–100%
Source: Center for Transportation Research, Argonne National Laboratory (2009). See Table 1. Notes: (1) Simulations for year 2020 with PHEV model year 2015. (2) No direct or indirect land use changes included in the WTW analysis for bio-mass fuel feedstocks.

The Argonne study found that PHEVs reduced petroleum energy use compared with conventional hybrid electric vehicles. More petroleum energy savings and greater GHG emissions reductions were realized as the all-electric range increased, except when the electricity used for recharging was dominated by coal- or oil-fired power generation. As expected, electricity from renewable sources realized the largest reductions in petroleum energy use and GHG emissions for all PHEVs as the all-electric range increased. The study also concluded that plug-in vehicles that employ biomass-based fuels (biomass-E85 and hydrogen) may not realize GHG-emissions benefits over regular hybrids if fossil sources dominate power generation.

=== Oak Ridge ===
A 2008 study by researchers at Oak Ridge National Laboratory analyzed oil use and greenhouse gas (GHG) emissions of plug-in hybrids relative to hybrid electric vehicles under several scenarios for the years 2020 and 2030. The study considered the mix of power sources for 13 U.S. regions that would be used during recharging of vehicles, generally a combination of coal, natural gas and nuclear energy, and to a lesser extent renewable energy. A 2010 study conducted at Argonne National Laboratory reached similar findings, concluding that PHEVs will reduce oil consumption but could produce very different greenhouse gas emissions for each region depending on the energy mix used to generate the electricity to recharge the plug-in hybrids.

=== Environmental Protection Agency ===
In October 2014, the U.S. Environmental Protection Agency published the 2014 edition of its annual report Light-Duty Automotive Technology, Carbon Dioxide Emissions, and Fuel Economy Trends. For the first time, the report presents an analysis of the impact of alternative fuel vehicles, with emphasis in plug-in electric vehicles because as their market share is approaching 1%, PEVs began to have a measurable impact on the U.S. overall new vehicle fuel economy and CO_{2} emissions.

EPA's report included the analysis of 12 all-electric passenger cars and 10 plug-in hybrids available in the market as of model year 2014. For an accurate estimate of emissions, the analysis accounted for operational differences among PHEVs, such as the Chevrolet Volt, which can operate in all-electric mode without using gasoline. Those that operate in a blended mode like the Toyota Prius PHV, which uses both energy stored in the battery and energy from the gasoline tank to propel the vehicle, but can deliver substantial all-electric driving in blended mode. In addition, since the all-electric range of plug-in hybrids depends on the size of the battery pack, the analysis introduced a utility factor to project the percentage of miles an average driver will drive on electricity (in electric-only and blended modes). The following table shows the overall EV/hybrid fuel economy, expressed in miles per gallon gasoline equivalent (mpg-e), and the utility factor for the ten MY2014 plug-in hybrids available in the U.S. market. The study used the utility factor (since in pure EV mode there are no tailpipe emissions) and the EPA's best estimate of the CO_{2} tailpipe emissions produced by these vehicles in real-world city and highway operation based on the EPA 5-cycle label methodology, using a weighted 55% city/45% highway driving. The results are shown in the following table.

In addition, the EPA accounted for upstream CO_{2} emissions from the production and distribution of the electricity used to charge the PHEVs. Since electricity production in the United States varies significantly from region to region, the EPA considered three scenarios/ranges, with the low end of the range corresponding to the California powerplant emissions factor, the middle of the range represented by the national average powerplant emissions factor, and the upper end of the range corresponding to the powerplant emissions factor for the Rockies. The EPA estimates that the electricity GHG emission factors for various regions of the country vary from 346 g CO_{2}/kW-hr in California to 986 g CO_{2}/kW-hr in the Rockies, with a national average of 648 g CO_{2}/kW-hr. The following table shows the tailpipe emissions and the combined tailpipe and upstream emissions for each of the 10 MY 2014 PHEVs available in the U.S. market.

Comparison of tailpipe and upstream CO_{2} emissions^{(1)} estimated by EPA for the MY 2014 plug-in hybrids available in the U.S. market as of September 2014
Vehicle	EPA rating combined EV/hybrid (mpg-e)	Utility factor^{(2)} (share EV miles)	Tailpipe CO_{2} (g/mi)	Tailpipe + Total Upstream CO_{2}		
Vehicle	EPA rating combined EV/hybrid (mpg-e)	Utility factor^{(2)} (share EV miles)	Tailpipe CO_{2} (g/mi)	Low (g/mi)	Avg (g/mi)	High (g/mi)
BMW i3 REx^{(3)}	88	0.83	40	134	207	288
Chevrolet Volt	62	0.66	81	180	249	326
Cadillac ELR	54	0.65	91	206	286	377
Ford C-Max Energi	51	0.45	129	219	269	326
Ford Fusion Energi	51	0.45	129	219	269	326
Honda Accord Plug-in Hybrid	57	0.33	130	196	225	257
Toyota Prius Plug-in Hybrid	58	0.29	133	195	221	249
BMW i8	37	0.37	198	303	351	404
Porsche Panamera S E-Hybrid	31	0.39	206	328	389	457
McLaren P1	17	0.43	463	617	650	687
Average gasoline car	24.2	0	367	400	400	400
Notes: (1) Based on 45% highway and 55% city driving. (2) The utility factor represents, on average, the percentage of miles that will be driven using electricity (in electric-only and blended modes) by an average driver. (3) The EPA classifies the i3 REx as a series plug-in hybrid

=== National Bureau of Economic Research ===
Most emission analyses use average emission rates across regions rather than marginal generation at different times of day. The former approach does not account for the generation mix in interconnected electricity markets and shifting load profiles throughout the day. An analysis by three economists affiliated with the National Bureau of Economic Research (NBER), published in November 2014, developed a methodology to estimate marginal emissions of electricity demand that vary by location and time of day across the United States. The study used emissions and consumption data for 2007 through 2009, and used the specifications for the Chevrolet Volt (all-electric range of 35 mi (56 km)). The analysis found that marginal emission rates are more than three times as large in the Upper Midwest compared to the Western U.S., and within regions, rates for some hours of the day are more than twice those for others. Applying the results of the marginal analysis to plug-in electric vehicles, the NBER researchers found that the emissions of charging PEVs vary by region and hours of the day. In some regions, such as the Western U.S. and Texas, CO_{2} emissions per mile from driving PEVs are less than those from driving a hybrid car. In other regions, such as the Upper Midwest, charging during the recommended hours of midnight to 4 a.m. means that PEVs emit more per mile than the average car currently on the road. The results show a fundamental tension between electricity load management and environmental goals, as the hours when electricity is the least expensive to produce tend to be the hours with the greatest emissions. This occurs because coal-fired units, which have higher emission rates, are most commonly used to meet base-level and off-peak electricity demand, while natural gas units, which have relatively low emission rates, are often brought online to meet peak demand. This pattern of fuel shifting explains why emission rates tend to be higher at night and lower during peak-demand periods in the morning and evening.

=== Recent studies (2020s) ===
A 2024 study analyzing China's top twenty selling PHEV models from 2020 to 2022 found significant discrepancies between real-world energy use and standardized test cycle values. The research showed that actual electricity intensity ranged from 20.2 to 38.2 kWh per 100 km, exceeding New European Driving Cycle (NEDC) values by 30–40%, while actual gasoline intensity of 4.7 to 23.5 liters per 100 km was 3–6 times higher than NEDC values. The study found that China's top-selling PHEVs emitted 4.7 million tonnes of CO_{2} nationwide from 2020 to 2022, with 1.9 million tonnes from electricity consumption and 2.8 million tonnes from gasoline combustion.

A comprehensive 2024 assessment of over 20 million electric vehicle registrations across 295 Chinese cities from 2022 to 2024 found that despite rapid electrification, gasoline still accounted for approximately 44% of total energy use in PHEVs and extended-range electric vehicles (EREVs), reflecting limited charging infrastructure access and owner charging behavior patterns. The study found that real-world energy intensities for PHEVs exceeded test-cycle values by 29% to 137% across different models, and that carbon intensities varied from 18.2 to 270.4 grams of CO_{2} per kilometer among different provinces depending on regional electricity generation mix.

A 2023 life cycle assessment study using China's Tsinghua-LCA model found that while PHEVs emit 41.6–49.1% more greenhouse gases during vehicle manufacturing compared to conventional internal combustion engine vehicles, primarily due to battery production accounting for nearly 30% of emissions in the vehicle cycle. These surplus emissions are offset by lower fuel-cycle emissions during operation. The study concluded that PHEVs achieve emission reduction rates of 13.97–53.39% compared to conventional vehicles in 2025, with the range depending on vehicle class, electric driving range, and regional electricity generation mix.

An International Council on Clean Transportation (ICCT) analysis of approximately 100,000 PHEVs in China, Europe, and North America found that real-world fuel consumption and tailpipe CO_{2} emissions were two to four times higher than type-approval values on average, with the deviation from NEDC values spanning much larger ranges than for conventional vehicles. The study highlighted significant regional variations in charging behavior and utility factors, with some PHEVs operating primarily on gasoline despite their electric capability.

A 2024 analysis by researchers at the University of Michigan examining different vehicle powertrains found that on average, a 50-mile range PHEV has greenhouse gas emissions 31–36% higher than a 300-mile range battery electric vehicle across various U.S. regions and grid mixes. The study employed both attributional and consequential lifecycle assessment approaches using NREL's Cambium model, finding that emissions vary significantly depending on regional grid carbon intensity, with 134 different balancing areas showing substantial variation in emissions factors across the United States.

== Production and sales ==
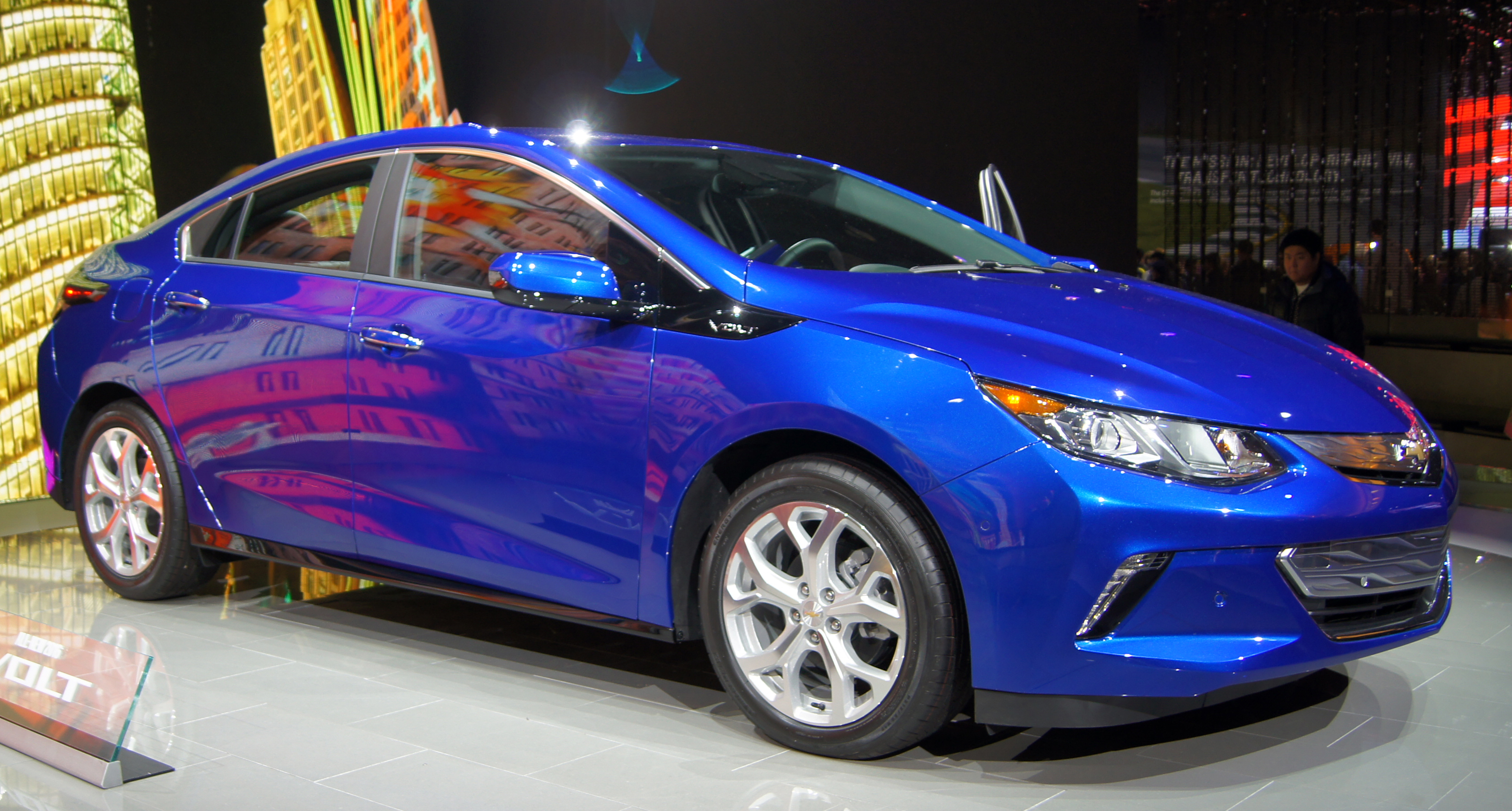
The Chevrolet Volt was the world's top-selling plug-in hybrid until September 2018.

Since 2008, plug-in hybrids have been commercially available from both specialty manufacturers and from mainstream producers of internal combustion engine vehicles. The F3DM, released in China in December 2008, was the first production plug-in hybrid to be sold worldwide. The Chevrolet Volt, launched in the U.S. in December 2010, was the first mass-production plug-in hybrid by a major carmaker.

There were 1.2 million plug-in hybrid cars on the world's roads at the end of 2017. The stock of plug-in hybrids increased to 1.8 million in 2018, out of a global stock of about 5.1 million plug-in electric passenger cars. As of December 2017, the United States ranked as the world's largest plug-in hybrid car market with a stock of 360,510 units, followed by China with 276,580 vehicles, Japan with 100,860 units, the Netherlands with 98,220, and the UK with 88,660.

Global sales of plug-in hybrids grew from over 300 units in 2010 to almost 9,000 in 2011, jumped to over 60,000 in 2012, and reached almost 222,000 in 2015. As of December 2015, the United States was the world's largest plug-in hybrid car market with a stock of 193,770 units. About 279,000 light-duty plug-in hybrids were sold in 2016, raising the global stock to almost 800,000 highway legal plug-in hybrid electric cars at the end of 2016. A total of 398,210 plug-in hybrid cars were sold in 2017, with China as the top-selling country with 111,000 units, and the global stock of plug-in hybrids passed the one million unit milestone by the end of 2017.

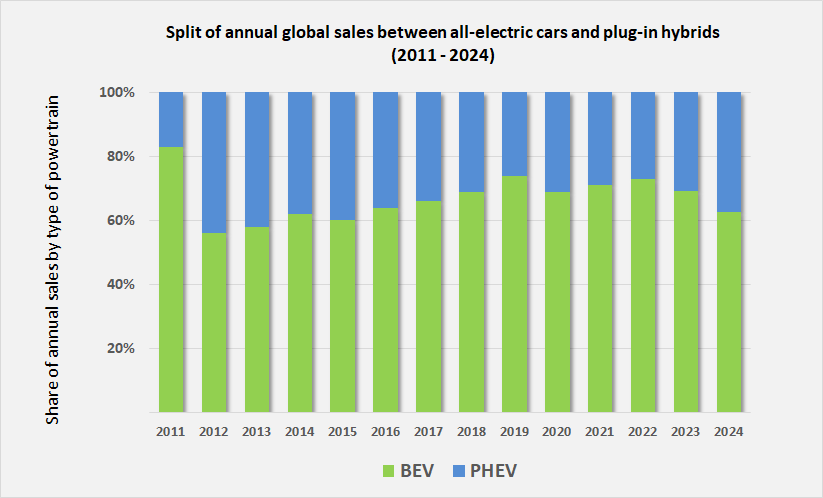
Evolution of the ratio between global sales of BEVs and PHEVs between 2011 and 2024

Global sales of plug-in electric vehicles have been shifting for several years towards fully electric battery cars. The global ratio of all-electrics (BEVs) to plug-in hybrids (PHEVs) went from 56:44 in 2012 to 60:40 in 2015, to 66:34 in 2017, and rose to 69:31 in 2018. In 2023, the ratio was 70:30, an increase for plug-in hybrids from the previous 73:27 in 2022.

China's contribution to the global share of plug-in hybrids ranged from 30% to 50% in 2017–2018, and fell to 25% in 2020. In 2021, China's share of global plug-in hybrids was 32%, rising to 55% in 2022 and 69% in 2023. From January to August 2024, the share rose to 77%, reaching 82% in the third quarter. Meanwhile, Europe's plug-in hybrid share rose from 28% in 2018 to 65% in 2020, and then fell to 15% in 2024.

Countries and regions by contribution of global plug-in hybrid sales
Region		2019	2020	2021	2022	2023	2024 (Q1–Q3)
China		41.9%	24.6%	32.3%	55.5%	68.9%	76.6%
Europe	Germany	9.2%	25.6%	18.0%	13.2%	4.4%	3.2%
Europe	UK	5.9%	6.9%	7.1%	3.8%	3.5%	2.8%
Europe	France	3.9%	9.0%	8.0%	4.7%	4.1%	2.4%
Europe	Sweden	5.5%	7.1%	4.3%	2.5%	1.5%	1.1%
Europe	Italy	1.2%	2.6%	5.2%	3.4%	1.7%	1.0%
Europe	Norway	3.9%	3.3%	2.1%	0.6%	0.3%	0.1%
Europe	Other Europe	7.3%	10.7%	11.5%	6.9%	6.4%	4.8%
Europe	Europe total	36.9%	65.5%	56.1%	35.1%	21.9%	15.4%
North America	United States	16.9%	7.5%	9.2%	6.9%	7.0%	5.8%
North America	Other North America	0.6%	0.1%	0.0%	0.0%	0.0%	0.0%
North America	North America total	17.6%	7.6%	9.2%	6.9%	7.1%	5.8%
Asia (except China)	Japan	3.0%	1.3%	1.3%	1.4%	1.3%	1.3%
Asia (except China)	South Korea	0.6%	1.0%	1.0%	0.4%	0.2%	0.1%
Asia (except China)	Other Asia	0.0%	0.1%	0.1%	0.6%	0.4%	0.2%
Asia (except China)	Asia total	3.6%	2.4%	2.3%	2.4%	1.9%	1.6%
Southern Hemisphere		0.1%	0.0%	0.1%	0.0%	0.2%	0.4%

=== By manufacturer ===
Between 2014 and 2019, the global market share of plug-in hybrids was largely led by BYD Auto. The company then saw its global plug-in hybrid market share increasing from 6.0% in 2020 to 39.1% in 2024. Geely Holding was the second-largest plug-in hybrid vehicle manufacturer in the world in 2025, with a 9.2% market share.

Due to the rapid growth of the plug-in hybrid vehicle market in China, manufacturers from outside China experienced a decline in global plug-in hybrid market share. Volkswagen Group's global plug-in hybrid share peaked at 16.4% in 2020, then declined steadily to 4.2% in 2024. BMW's share followed a similar pattern, dropping from 9.8% in 2021 to 2.2% in 2024. Stellantis reached its highest share of 8.1% in 2021 but fell to 4.3% in 2024. Toyota's share of plug-in hybrids decreased over time, from 9.9% in 2019 to 2.4% in 2024. Hyundai's share fell from 6.4% in 2019 to 1.7% in 2024.

Manufacturers by global plug-in hybrid market share
Manufacturer	2019	2020	2021	2022	2023	2024	2025 (Q1–Q3)
BYD Auto	14.6%	6.0%	15.5%	35.5%	36.2%	39.1%	33.5%
Geely Holding	11.6%	11.3%	9.3%	7.6%	7.3%	7.4%	9.2%
Chery Holding	0.1%	0.1%	0.1%	1.4%	2.7%	4.2%	7.0%
Li Auto	0.2%	3.8%	5.1%	5.0%	9.4%	7.9%	5.7%
Changan Automobile	0.0%	0.0%	1.6%	5.3%	5.0%	5.5%	5.8%
Volkswagen Group	4.5%	16.4%	14.7%	7.0%	5.6%	3.9%	5.2%
Seres Auto					2.4%	6.1%	4.8%
Great Wall Motor	0.1%	0.1%	1.0%	3.9%	3.9%	4.0%	4.7%
BMW	11.9%	12.4%	9.8%	6.2%	3.8%	2.2%	2.6%
Dongfeng Motor Group	0.4%	0.2%	0.9%	3.9%	1.2%	1.8%	2.6%
Mercedes-Benz Group	5.2%	13.6%	8.5%	4.8%	3.0%	2.2%	2.5%
Stellantis	1.1%	6.2%	8.1%	7.4%	6.3%	3.1%	2.3%
Toyota	9.9%	4.2%	5.4%	2.4%	2.3%	1.8%	2.2%
SAIC Motor	11.6%	6.3%	5.0%	3.5%	2.2%	2.5%	2.1%
Leapmotor	0.9%	0.9%	0.9%	0.9%	1.2%	1.1%	1.5%
Hyundai Motor Group	6.4%	6.4%	5.7%	4.4%	2.7%	1.4%	1.3%
BAIC Group		0.2%	0.5%	0.9%	0.0%	0.1%	0.8%
GAC Group	0.6%	0.0%	0.1%	0.3%	0.8%	0.8%	0.7%
General Motors	1.4%	0.0%	0.0%	0.0%	0.0%	0.5%	0.7%

== Government support and public deployment ==
Several countries have established grants and tax credits for the purchase of new plug-in electric vehicles (PEVs), including plug-in hybrid electric vehicles; usually, the economic incentive depends on battery size.

=== United States ===
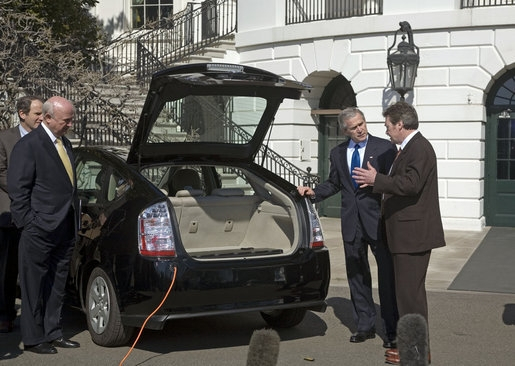
President Bush with A123Systems CEO on the White House South Lawn examining a Toyota Prius converted to plug-in hybrid with Hymotion technology

Incentives for the development of PHEVs are included in the Energy Independence and Security Act of 2007. The Energy Improvement and Extension Act of 2008, signed into law on October 3, 2008, grants a tax credit for the purchase of PHEVs. President Barack Obama's New Energy for America calls for deployment of 1 million plug-in hybrid vehicles by 2015, and on March 19, 2009, he announced programs directing $2.4 billion to electric vehicle development.

The American Recovery and Reinvestment Act of 2009 modifies the tax credits, including a new one for plug-in electric drive conversion kits and for 2 or 3 wheel vehicles. The ultimate total included in the Act that is going to PHEVs is over $6 billion.

In March 2009, as part of the American Recovery and Reinvestment Act, the US Department of Energy announced the release of two competitive solicitations for up to $2 billion in federal funding for competitively awarded cost-shared agreements for manufacturing of advanced batteries and related drive components as well as up to $400 million for transportation electrification demonstration and deployment projects. This announcement will also help meet the President Barack Obama's goal of putting one million plug-in hybrid vehicles on the road by 2015.

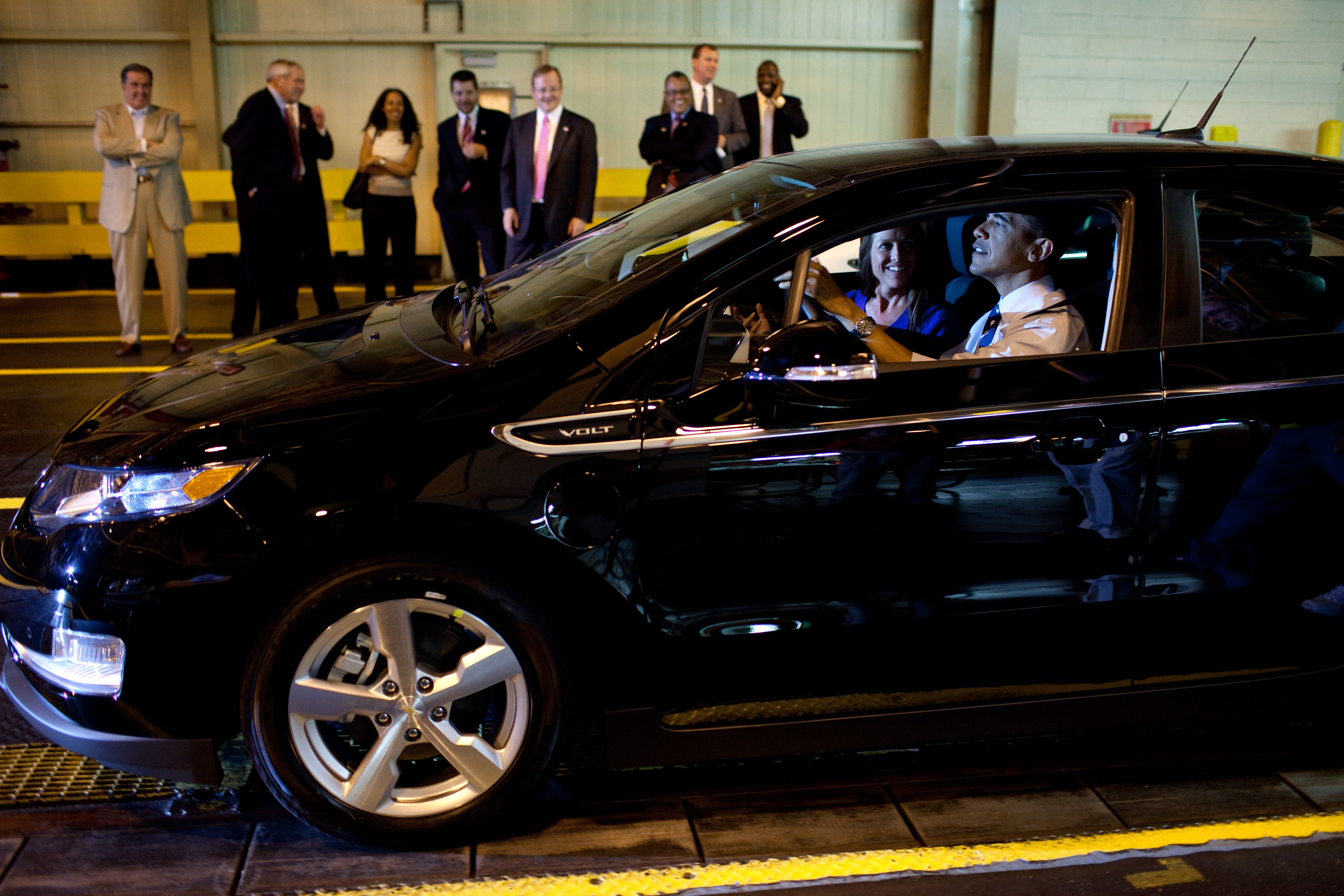
President Barack Obama behind the wheel of a Chevy Volt during his tour of the General Motors Auto Plant in Hamtramck, Michigan

The United States federal government offered tax credits for plug-in electric vehicles from 2010 through September 30, 2025. Under the Inflation Reduction Act of 2022, new plug-in hybrid vehicles with battery capacity of at least 7 kilowatt-hours were eligible for a federal income tax credit of up to $7,500 for vehicles acquired before October 1, 2025. The credit was structured as two $3,750 components based on critical mineral and battery component requirements. Vehicles had to meet final assembly, battery sourcing, and price requirements to qualify.

The One Big Beautiful Bill Act, enacted on July 4, 2025, accelerated the termination of federal clean vehicle tax credits from 2032 to September 30, 2025. Vehicles acquired under binding contract with payment before September 30, 2025 remained eligible for the credit when placed in service, even after that date.

The Alternative Fuel Vehicle Refueling Property Credit, providing 30% of installation costs up to $1,000 for residential electric vehicle charging equipment, remained available for property placed in service before July 1, 2026.

State and local governments continued to offer various incentives for plug-in hybrid vehicles. California's income-targeted programs, including Clean Cars 4 All and the Driving Clean Assistance Program, provided up to $12,000 to $14,000 for eligible residents to replace older vehicles with plug-in hybrids. Colorado offered a base tax credit of $750 for plug-in hybrids through its Innovative Motor Vehicle Credit, with an additional $2,500 available for vehicles priced under $35,000, as well as income-based exchange rebates of up to $9,000 for new plug-in hybrids through the Vehicle Exchange Colorado program. Connecticut maintained plug-in hybrid incentives, though specific program details varied by income level and vehicle type.

=== Canada ===
The Canadian federal government launched the Electric Vehicle Affordability Program on February 16, 2026, with CAD $2.275 billion in funding over five years through March 31, 2031. Plug-in hybrid vehicles with electric range under 50 km (31 mi) qualified for up to CAD $2,500, while longer-range plug-in hybrids with electric range of 50 kilometers or more qualified for up to CAD $5,000. The program applied to vehicles with a final transaction value of CAD $50,000 or less, though Canadian-built vehicles were exempt from the price cap. Incentive amounts were scheduled to decrease gradually between 2026 and 2031.

The program replaced the Incentives for Zero-Emission Vehicles program, which operated from 2019 until March 31, 2025 and provided up to CAD $5,000 for qualifying vehicles.

Provincial incentives varied significantly. Quebec's Roulez Vert program offered up to CAD $2,000 for new plug-in hybrids with manufacturer's suggested retail price under CAD $65,000. Prince Edward Island provided up to CAD $2,000 for plug-in hybrids as of June 2, 2025. Manitoba and Newfoundland and Labrador offered additional incentives. British Columbia suspended its CleanBC Go Electric passenger vehicle rebate program in May 2025. New Brunswick and Nova Scotia ended their light-duty electric vehicle incentive programs in 2025.

=== China ===
China began implementing its new energy vehicle program in 2009 to foster the development and introduction of plug-in electric vehicles. On June 1, 2010, the Chinese government announced a trial program to provide incentives for new energy vehicles in five cities: Shanghai, Shenzhen, Hangzhou, Hefei, and Changchun. The program offered up to 50,000 yuan for plug-in hybrid vehicles purchased privately, with subsidies paid directly to automakers rather than consumers. The government set a goal to raise the country's annual production capacity to 500,000 plug-in hybrid or all-electric vehicles by the end of 2011.

In January 2017, the government announced updated criteria for plug-in hybrid manufacturer subsidies that would be valid for 2017 and 2018, applying to new energy passenger cars, buses, coaches, and freight trucks. In March 2019, the government announced substantial reductions to subsidies, with most vehicle types receiving more than 50% less than 2018 levels. During this period, plug-in hybrid vehicles received approximately 4,800 yuan in consumer discounts.

Direct consumer subsidies for plug-in hybrid vehicles ended at the conclusion of 2022.

The purchase tax exemption, first introduced on September 1, 2014, was extended multiple times. In June 2023, the exemption was extended through the end of 2027 with new limitations. For plug-in hybrid vehicles purchased in 2024 and 2025, the tax exemption was capped at ¥30,000 per vehicle. For vehicles purchased in 2026 and 2027, purchase tax applied at half the normal rate with a maximum reduction of ¥15,000.

In January 2025, China announced a renewed trade-in subsidy program offering up to ¥20,000 for buyers who replaced older vehicles with new plug-in hybrid vehicles. This was part of a broader economic stimulus package that had been introduced in April 2024.

In October 2025, three Chinese government departments jointly announced new technical requirements for plug-in hybrid vehicles eligible for purchase tax incentives in 2026 and 2027. From January 1, 2026, plug-in hybrid vehicles were required to achieve at least 100 km (62 mi) of electric-only range to qualify for tax incentives, up from the previous 43 km (27 mi) requirement. Vehicles already listed in the tax exemption catalogue before December 31, 2025 that met the new requirements automatically transferred to the 2026 catalogue. Industry analysts estimated that approximately 40% of plug-in hybrid vehicles on the market had electric ranges below the new 100 kilometer requirement.

=== Japan ===
When the Toyota Prius Plug-in Hybrid launched in January 2012, Japan's eco-car subsidy program was in effect from December 2011 through September 2012. The program provided subsidies of ¥100,000 for purchasing an environmentally friendly vehicle, or ¥250,000 when trading in a vehicle 13 years or older.

By 2021, Japan's Clean Energy Vehicles subsidy program provided subsidies for plug-in hybrid vehicles, with a maximum of approximately ¥800,000 per vehicle. In 2024, plug-in hybrid vehicles were eligible for subsidies up to ¥550,000.

Japan revised its Clean Energy Vehicles subsidy program effective January 2026, increasing the maximum subsidy for battery electric vehicles from ¥900,000 to ¥1,300,000. Plug-in hybrid vehicles remained eligible for subsidies up to ¥550,000.

=== European Union ===
Several European Union member states introduced direct purchase incentives for plug-in hybrid electric vehicles during the 2010s. Germany, France, Italy, and Austria implemented purchase premiums in 2016, which were subsequently adjusted multiple times over the following years.

Germany launched the Umweltbonus (Environmental Bonus) program in May 2016 with a €1 billion budget, providing €4,000 for battery electric vehicles and €3,000 for plug-in hybrid electric vehicles, with costs split equally between the government and participating manufacturers. Eligible vehicles were initially required to have a list price below €60,000. The program was restructured in November 2019 to provide tiered subsidies of €6,000 for battery electric vehicles priced below €40,000 and €4,500 for plug-in hybrids in the same price range. In June 2020, as part of Germany's COVID-19 economic recovery plan, the government doubled its contribution through the "Innovation Bonus," raising maximum subsidies to €9,000 for battery electric vehicles and €6,750 for plug-in hybrids priced below €40,000. Subsidies for plug-in hybrid vehicles were discontinued in December 2022, and the entire Umweltbonus program ended in December 2023. Between 2016 and 2023, approximately €10 billion was distributed through the program for the purchase of 2.2 million vehicles, consisting of 1.4 million battery electric vehicles and 800,000 plug-in hybrids.

France maintained a bonus-malus system providing subsidies for low-emission vehicles. In April 2015, France introduced a "super-bonus" increasing the maximum financial incentive to €10,000, consisting of the standard bonus of €6,300 for purchasing a pure electric car plus up to €3,700 for scrapping a diesel-powered vehicle registered before January 1, 2001. Plug-in hybrid electric vehicles with emissions between 21 and 60 grams CO₂ per kilometer received a €1,000 purchase bonus during 2016-2017. In 2020, as part of France's COVID-19 recovery measures, the ecological bonus was increased to a maximum of €7,000 for battery electric vehicles and plug-in hybrids. Plug-in hybrid vehicles lost eligibility for the bonus écologique in 2024.

Portugal provides a 75% acquisition tax reduction for plug-in hybrid electric vehicles with at least 50 kilometers electric range and emissions below 50 grams CO₂ per kilometer. For company cars, businesses can deduct value-added tax up to €50,000 plus VAT for plug-in hybrids.

Romania offered purchase subsidies of approximately €4,500 for new plug-in hybrid electric vehicles, with battery electric vehicles exempt from annual ownership tax.

=== United Kingdom ===
The United Kingdom introduced the Plug-in Car Grant on January 1, 2011, providing a discount of 25% or £5,000 (whichever was less) for eligible electric and plug-in hybrid electric vehicles. In April 2015, the grant structure was revised to offer discounts of 35% or £5,000 maximum, with the program categorizing vehicles based on emissions and electric range. Plug-in hybrid electric vehicles fell into Category 2 (emissions below 50 grams CO₂ per kilometer with zero emission range between 10 and 69 miles) and Category 3 (emissions between 50 and 75 grams CO₂ per kilometer with zero emission range of at least 20 miles).

In March 2016, the grant was restructured with two rates: £4,500 for Category 1 vehicles (battery electric vehicles) and £2,500 for Categories 2 and 3 (plug-in hybrids), with a price cap of £60,000 introduced for plug-in hybrids. By November 2015, approximately 50,000 people had benefited from the grant since its inception in 2011.

The government announced in October 2018 that Categories 2 and 3 vehicles, comprising all plug-in hybrid electric vehicles, would lose eligibility for the grant, while the Category 1 grant for battery electric vehicles was reduced to £3,500. The changes took effect when order limits were reached on October 21, 2018. The Plug-in Car Grant for all passenger vehicles ended on June 14, 2022, by which time it had provided over £1.4 billion in funding and supported the purchase of nearly 500,000 vehicles. As of 2026, the United Kingdom does not provide direct purchase subsidies for plug-in hybrid electric vehicles.

=== Australia ===
Australia introduced a fringe benefits tax exemption for eligible zero-emission vehicles through the Electric Car Discount Bill, which received Royal Assent on December 12, 2022. The exemption came into effect on January 1, 2023, but was applied retrospectively to vehicles first held and used on or after July 1, 2022. The exemption applied to battery electric vehicles, hydrogen fuel cell vehicles, and plug-in hybrid electric vehicles provided through novated lease or company car arrangements, with vehicle values below the luxury car tax threshold for fuel-efficient vehicles.

Plug-in hybrid electric vehicles lost fringe benefits tax (FBT) exempt status from April 1, 2025. Exemptions continued to apply where plug-in hybrid vehicles were used or available for use before April 1, 2025 under financially binding commitments established prior to that date. The Australian government announced in May 2026 a phased restructure of the electric vehicle FBT exemption, effective from April 1, 2027, limiting the full exemption to vehicles priced below $75,000, with vehicles between $75,000 and the luxury car tax threshold receiving a 25% FBT discount. From April 1, 2029, all eligible electric vehicles will receive only a 25% FBT discount, ending the full exemption.

The luxury car tax threshold for fuel-efficient vehicles, which includes plug-in hybrid electric vehicles, was set at $91,387 for the 2025-26 financial year, compared to $80,567 for standard vehicles. Battery electric vehicles remain exempt from the 5% customs duty on importation. Most state-level incentive programs, including purchase rebates and registration exemptions, concluded between 2023 and 2025.

== See also ==
- Extended-range electric vehicle – Electric vehicle with an onboard engine-driven generator for extended range
- Government incentives for plug-in electric vehicles
- Green vehicle – Environmentally friendly vehicles
- History of the electric vehicle
- Plug-in electric vehicle – Type of vehicle (PEV)
- Plug-in Hybrid Electric Vehicle Research Center – American public research university
- Range anxiety – Fear of insufficient vehicle range, especially in electric vehicles
- List of hybrid and plug-in hybrid vehicles
