= Elect'road =

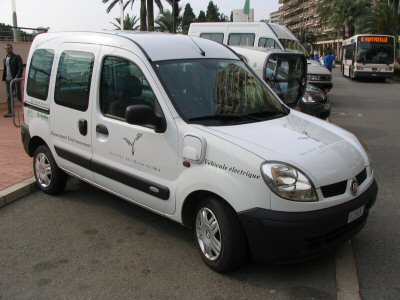
Renault Kangoo Elect'road plug-in hybrid van.

The Elect'Road is a plug-in series hybrid version of Renault's popular Kangoo. Sales began in Europe in 2003, mainly in France, Norway and a few in the UK. The Elect'Road was sold alongside Renault's Electri'cité electric-drive Kangoo battery electric van. Renault discontinued the Elect'Road after selling about 500, primarily in France, Norway and the UK, for about €25,000.

The Elect'Road had a 150 km (93 mi) range using a nickel-cadmium battery pack and a 16 kW (21 bhp; 22 PS) liquid-cooled gasoline Lombardini LGW523 MPI "range-extender" engine.

Although the Elect'road had a range extender it is effectively the very first plug-in hybrid electric vehicle (PHEV). In hybrid terms it operates in a blended mode, using engine and battery power simultaneously.

Passenger compartment heat is powered by the battery pack as well as an auxiliary coolant circuit that is heated by the range extender engine.

== Motor ==
The synchronous motor does not require brush replacement (e.g. as in the Citroën Berlingo Electrique) and therefore reduces required maintenance.

== Batteries ==
The vehicle is equipped with a Saft nickel-cadmium battery and has a range of 60 km (40 mi) to 100 km (60 mi) when in all electric mode. The battery consists of two cases underneath the chassis, one with 8 monoblocks and the other with 14. Each is fitted with a fan cooling system and has a minimum 100 A·h capacity. The 312 kilograms (688 lb) battery provides 132 V and 13.2 kWh.

The onboard 3.5-kilowatt charger could charge a depleted battery pack to 95% charge in about four hours from 220 volts.

The battery life is guaranteed for 5 years (1500 cycles) and the cost to replace them if needed was 7000EUR.

== Range extender ==
The range extender is a Lombardini (LGW 523 mpi) liquid cooled 505-cubic-centimetre (31 cu in) 16-kilowatt (21 hp) gasoline generator. The generator used two high voltage/high output/low volume alternators, each of which supplied up to 5.5 kilowatts (7.4 hp) at 132 volts at 5000 rpm. The operating speed of the internal combustion engine—and therefore the output delivered by the generators—varied according to demand.

It is equipped with a multipoint injection system and catalytic converter (consistent with the rules of euro 2000 in the MVEG cycle).

The fuel tank has a capacity of 11 litres and is housed within the right rear wheel arch. The range extender function is activated by a switch on the dashboard.

The Elect'road also offers a "boost" mode which provides better acceleration, by increasing the maximum power from 22 to 29 kW, together with a "snow" mode which is better adapted to driving on low-grip surfaces.

When the RE engine is run all the time, the fuel economy drops to 7 liters/100 km (39 miles per imperial gallon). However, a user has found that they only needed to use it 10% of the time in which case economy improves to 3 liters/100 km (91 miles per imperial gallon).

== Summary of features ==
- Battery
  - Air cooled nickel-cadmium battery batteries, guaranteed for 5 years (1500 cycles)
  - Charging time:
    - 0 to 95% in 4 hours using internal 3.5 kW charger from a 220 V supply for 15 A circuits
    - 2 kW charge mode is available for 10 A circuits
- Range Extender:
  - Fuel tank capacity: 10 l
  - Output
    - Normal Mode: 10 kW
    - Boost Mode: 22 to 29 kW
- Range/max-speed:
  - Electric Mode: 80 km (50 mi) easily / 100 km/h (60 mph)
  - Petrol Only: ? km/100 km/h (60 mph)
  - Electric & petrol Mode: 150–200 km (90–120 mi)/115 km/h (71 mph)
- Driving experience
  - Main cabin preheats during winter (when plugged in)
  - Automatic creep (remove your foot from the brake and the van will start to move forward)
  - Warning light comes on at 10 percent state of charge
