= Nickel manganese oxide =

Names
- IUPAC name Nickel manganese oxide

Identifiers
3D model (JSmol)	Ni_{2}MnO_{4}: Interactive image
- InChI: Ni_{2}MnO_{4}: InChI=1S/Mn.2Ni.4O/q+4;2*+2;4*-2 Key: KBRFCEXWEJRPRW-UHFFFAOYSA-N
- SMILES: Ni_{2}MnO_{4}: [Ni+2].[Ni+2].[Mn+4].[O-2].[O-2].[O-2].[O-2]
- Except where otherwise noted, data are given for materials in their standard state (at 25 °C [77 °F], 100 kPa). Infobox references

Nickel manganese oxides, or nickel manganates, are spinel structure compounds of nickel, manganese and oxygen of the form: Ni_{(x)}Mn_{(3−x)}O_{(y)}

Some common forms are Ni_{2}MnO_{4}, NiMn_{2}O_{4}, and Ni_{1.5}Mn_{1.5}O_{4}

They are most commonly formulated for use in thin film resistors and thermistors. The resistivity and temperature coefficient can be accurately controlled in the manufacturing process. In nickel-metal hydride batteries the addition of manganese oxide provides for formation of spinel structure nickel manganates in various oxidation states, with higher conductivity and charge capacity than nickel hydroxides alone.

Magnetic properties of nickel manganates. Although nickel manganates exhibit ferromagnetic behaviour at low temperatures, they have a paramagnetic behavior at room temperature. The magnetic behavior depends on the cation distribution and spin alignment among them. In nickel manganates, the Ni^{2+} and Mn^{4+} ions have a strong preference for occupying octahedral sites instead of tetrahedral sites. Mn^{2+} ion is in tetrahedral sites and Mn^{3+} ion can be in both sites. Also, these compounds has been studied as electrodes for supercapacitors and as photocatalyst taking advantage of the change in the oxidation state of the Mn cations.
