= List of carbon fiber monocoque cars =

This is a list of production cars with carbon fiber monocoque cell design.

Carbon-fiber monocoque design has been commonly used in racing cars since the 1980s, like Formula racing and Le Mans series prototypes. The first production car with carbon-fiber monocoque design was the MCA Centenaire. Now many modern sports cars have carbon-fiber monocoque cells, and some big car manufacturers have also started applying the same in passenger cars like the BMW i3. the Xworks automotive X1 concept was also made in 2004, with a vacuum formed Carbon fibre Monocoque. One of the very first to use actual vacuum process.

== Eligible cars ==
For the purposes of this list, a production car is defined as a vehicle that:

1. has a carbon-fiber monocoque/tub.
2. is constructed principally for retail sale to consumers, for their personal use, to transport people on public roads. No commercial or industrial vehicles are eligible.
3. is available for commercial sale to the public.
4. is manufactured by a manufacturer whose WMI number is shown on the VIN, including vehicles that are modified by either professional tuners or others that result in a VIN with a WMI number in their name. (For example, if a Porsche-based car is remanufactured by RUF and has RUF's WMI W09, it is eligible; but if it has Porsche's WMI, WP0, it is not eligible.)
5. is street-legal in its intended markets, having fulfilled the homologation tests or inspections required under the law of either the United States of America, the European Union, or Japan to be granted this status.
6. is sold in more than one national market.

== List ==
| Model | Manufacturer | Nation | First year of Production | Class | Engine | Induction | Electric motor |
|---|---|---|---|---|---|---|---|
| SCX | Agile | (Denmark) | 2021 | Sports car | 2.0L I4 | Turbo | - |
| 4C | Alfa Romeo | (Italy) | 2013 | Sports car | 1.75L I4 | Turbo | - |
| Murtaya | ALS Sports Cars | (United Kingdom) | 2006 | Kit car | 2.0L B4 (Subaru) | Turbo | - |
| KZ1 | Ascari | (United Kingdom) | 2003 | Sports car | 5.0L V8 (BMW) | - | - |
| One-77 | Aston Martin | (United Kingdom) | 2009 | Sports car | 7.3L V12 | - | - |
| i3 | BMW | (Germany) | 2013 | City car | 0.647L I2 (REx models) | - | 125 kW |
| i8 | BMW | (Germany) | 2013 | Sports car | 1.5L I3 | Turbo | 98 kW |
| Chiron | Bugatti | (France) | 2016 | Sports car | 8.0L W16 | Quad-turbo | - |
| EB110 | Bugatti | (Italy) | 1991 | Sports car | 3.5L V12 | Quad-turbo | - |
| Veyron | Bugatti | (France) | 2005 | Sports car | 8.0L W16 | Quad-turbo | - |
| Stradale | Dallara | (Italy) | 2017 | Sports car | 2.3L I4 | Turbo | - |
| GT | Ford | (United States) | 2017 | Sports car | 3.5L V6 | Twin-turbo | - |
| F50 | Ferrari | (Italy) | 1995 | Sports car | 4.7L V12 | - | - |
| Enzo | Ferrari | (Italy) | 2002 | Sports car | 6.0L V12 | - | - |
| LaFerrari | Ferrari | (Italy) | 2013 | Sports car | 6.3L V12 | - | 120 kW (KERS) |
| F80 | Ferrari | (Italy) | 2025 | Sports car | 3.0L V6 | Twin-turbo | 221 kW |
| XJR-15 | Jaguar | (United Kingdom) | 1990 | Sports car | 6.0L V12 | - | - |
| CC8S | Koenigsegg | (Sweden) | 2002 | Sports car | 4.7L V8 (Ford) | Supercharger | - |
| CCR | Koenigsegg | (Sweden) | 2004 | Sports car | 4.6L V8 (based on Ford) | Twin-turbo | - |
| CCX | Koenigsegg | (Sweden) | 2005 | Sports car | 4.7~4.8L V8 | Twin-Supercharger | - |
| Agera | Koenigsegg | (Sweden) | 2011 | Sports car | 5.0L V8 | Twin-turbo | - |
| Regera | Koenigsegg | (Sweden) | 2015 | Sports car | 5.0L V8 | Twin-turbo | 340 kW (160+180) |
| Aventador | Lamborghini | (Italy) | 2011 | Sports car | 6.5L V12 | - | - |
| Countach | Lamborghini | (Italy) | 2022 | Sports car | 6.5L V12 | - | 48V 34CV |
| LFA | Lexus | (Japan) | 2010 | Sports car | 4.8L V10 | - | - |
| MC20 | Maserati | (Italy) | 2020 | Sports car | 3L V6 | Twin-turbo | - |
| Centenaire | MCA | (Monaco) | 1990 | Sports car | 4L V12 | Twin-turbo | - |
| F1 | McLaren | (United Kingdom) | 1992 | Sports car | 6.1L V12 (BMW) | - | - |
| 12C | McLaren | (United Kingdom) | 2011 | Sports car | 3.8L V8 | Twin-turbo | - |
| P1 | McLaren | (United Kingdom) | 2013 | Sports car | 3.8L V8 | Twin-turbo | 131 kW |
| 650S | McLaren | (United Kingdom) | 2014 | Sports car | 3.8L V8 | Twin-turbo | - |
| 675LT | McLaren | (United Kingdom) | 2016 | Sports car | 3.8L V8 | Twin-turbo | - |
| 570S | McLaren | (United Kingdom) | 2016 | Sports car | 3.8L V8 | Twin-turbo | - |
| 570 GT | McLaren | (United Kingdom) | 2016 | Sports car | 3.8L V8 | Twin-turbo | - |
| 720S | McLaren | (United Kingdom) | 2017 | Sports car | 4.0L V8 | Twin-turbo | - |
| Senna | McLaren | (United Kingdom) | 2017 | Sports car | 4.0L V8 | Twin-turbo | - |
| 765LT | McLaren | (United Kingdom) | 2020 | Sports car | 4.0L V8 | Twin-turbo | |
| CLK-GTR Straßenversion | Mercedes-Benz | (Germany) | 1998 | Sports car | 6.0L V12 | - | - |
| SLR McLaren | Mercedes-Benz | (Germany) | 2003 | Sports car | 5.4L V8 | Supercharger | - |
| MG XPower SV | MG Cars | (United Kingdom) | 2003 | Sports car | 5.0L V8 engine | | - |
| Zonda | Pagani | (Italy) | 1999 | Sports car | 6.0~7.3L V12 (Mercedes-Benz) | - | - |
| Huayra | Pagani | (Italy) | 2011 | Sports car | 6.0 V12 (Mercedes-Benz) | Twin-turbo | - |
| Utopia | Pagani | (Italy) | 2022 | Sports car | 6.0 V12 (Mercedes-Benz) | Twin-turbo | - |
| 911 GT1-98 Straßenversion | Porsche | (Germany) | 1998 | Sports car | 3.2L B6 | Twin-turbo | - |
| Carrera GT | Porsche | (Germany) | 2004 | Sports car | 5.7L V10 | - | - |
| 918 Spyder | Porsche | (Germany) | 2013 | Sports car | 4.6L V8 | - | 205 kW |
| Nevera | Rimac | (Croatia) | 2022 | Sports car | - | - | 1408 kW |
