= Feroce =

Feroce (Italian for 'ferocious') or Féroce (French for 'ferocious') may refer to:

- Delfino Feroce, a British sports car
- Fairey Féroce, a British fighter aircraft of the 1930s
- Féroce, an avocado dish with chillis etc.
- Giovanni Feroce, American businessman and politician
