= Murtaya =

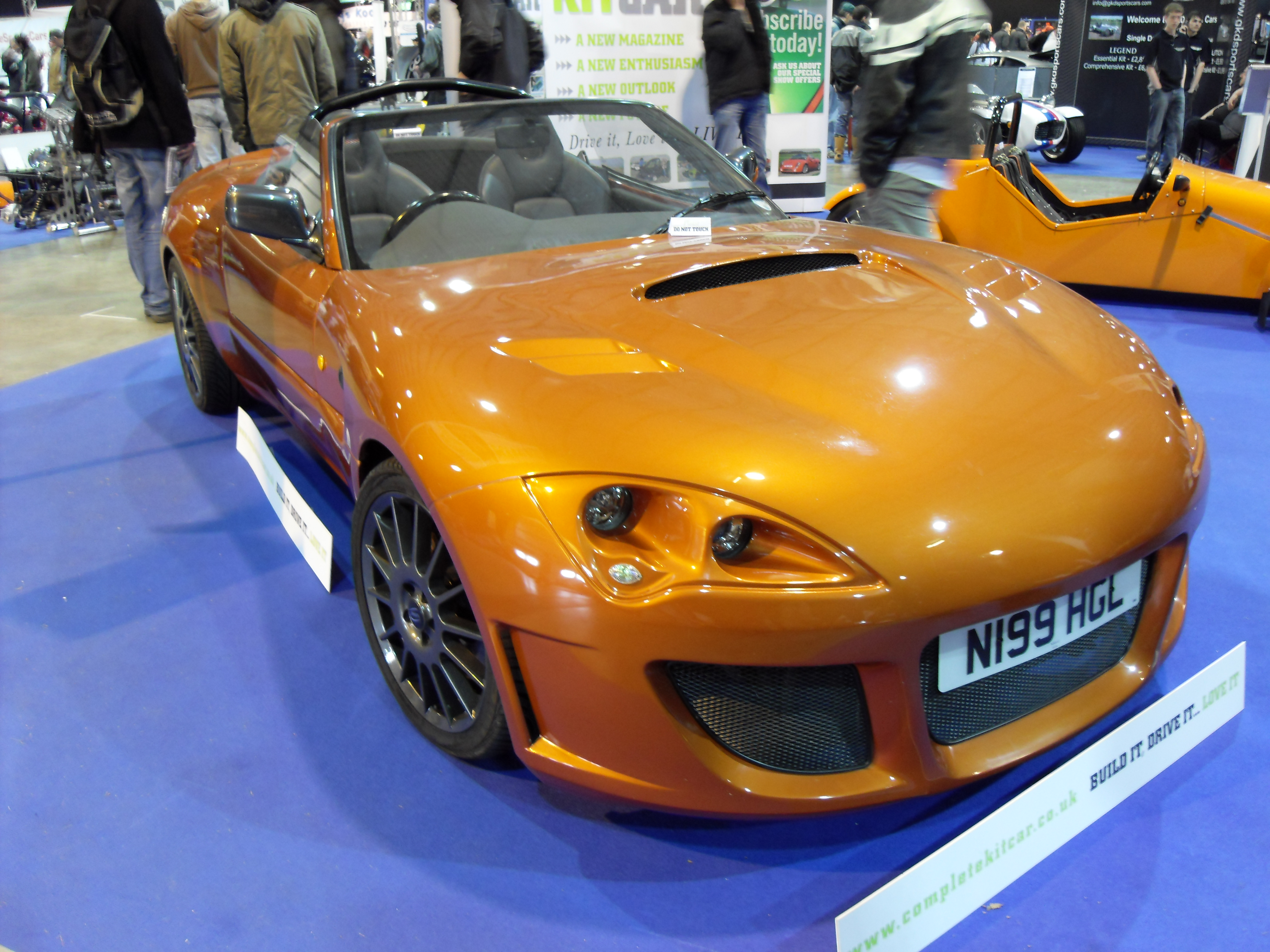

Overview
- Manufacturer: ALS Sports Cars
- Production: 2006–present
- Designer: Dan Muir, Tom Taylor, Neil Yates

Body and chassis
- Class: Roadster
- Body style: 2-door convertible
- Layout: FA (Front engine / AWD)

Powertrain
- Engine: 2.0 L Turbo H4; 2.5 L Turbo H4; 150–400 hp
- Transmission: 5-speed manual 6-speed manual

Dimensions
- Curb weight: 850–925 kg (1870–2035 lbs) (dry weight)

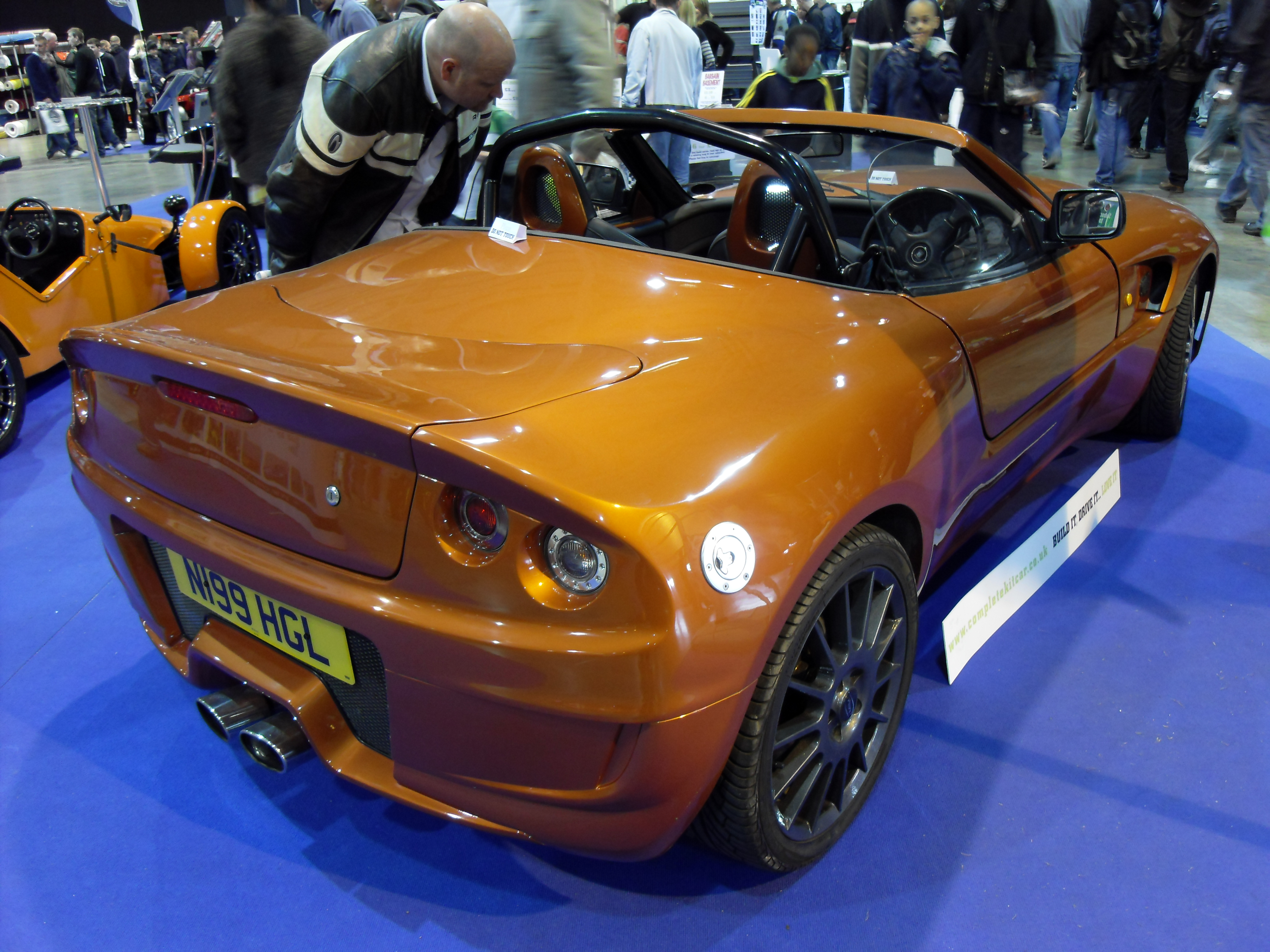
The Murtaya rear view

The Murtaya is a lightweight, all-wheel drive (AWD), turbocharged flat-4 roadster based on the GC-generation (1992–2000) Subaru Impreza WRX STi. The Murtaya is the only low volume MSA-approved category 2, specialist rally car currently available. The Murtaya Sports car is built, sold and is currently being further developed by ALS Sports Cars LLP, based near Tyne and Wear.

== History ==
Originally known under the codename AMS1, the Murtaya was first announced to the world on 11 April 2006 as a kit car that would be based on the Subaru Impreza. The Murtaya was basically a complete rework of the Delfino Feroce, as Adrenaline Motorsport, having just taken over rights to the Feroce, decided that the Delfino had enough shortcomings to warrant a redesign. The Minari, from which the Delfino Feroce was developed, and of which Adrenaline Motorsport also had the rights, was also used as inspiration.

The Murtaya project was led by Neil Yates, managing director of Adrenaline Motorsport, and Tom Taylor, Head Engineer of Adrenaline Motorsport. Daniel Muir was the Head Designer of the Murtaya; his past credits includes the first generation Lotus Elise and various Aston Martin models.

The Murtaya name is derived from the names of these three people. 'Murtaya' is the conglomeration of the three directors' surnames, MUR from Muir, TA from Taylor, YA from Yates.

The IPR to the Murtaya in its entirety was adopted by one of the early investors after the demise of Adrenaline Motorsport in 2010. Determined not to let the unique car be forgotten, the investor started Murtaya Sports Cars Limited.

Three Murtaya's were built under licence in New Zealand by Les Summerfield of Rangiora between 2009 and 2012. They retailed for NZ$35,000 which made them expensive in a market where they were competing against Mazda MX-5's.

In February 2013 the rights to the production of the Murtaya, along with all of the tooling, were sold to ALS Sports Cars LLP. ALS Sports Cars LLP was run by Andrew Starforth, an experienced engineer in multiple fields. Production of the Murtaya recommenced some months later, however was then put on hold.

== Composition ==
The basis of the Murtaya consists of a GRP monocoque tub with a front space-frame that contains the engine. The front suspension attaches to the space-frame while the rear suspension attaches directly to the monocoque tub.

The Murtaya is a single-donor car, meaning that you do not need to match parts from various donor cars to complete the car.

The Murtaya was initially created as a kit car for financial reasons, but it is currently offered in many different types of packages:

- A comprehensive Murtaya kit (or several different modular versions of the kit), allowing customers to assemble their Murtaya themselves.
- A rolling chassis build for those customers who wish to finish the build themselves.
- Fully finished turn-key builds
- In some markets (Middle East, etc.), the Murtaya can be bought as a brand new car (i.e., even the donor car is brand new).

== Specifications ==
The Murtaya is offered in many different variations. The two major types are the road car spec and the track car spec. The former offers a full windshield and features like AC, leather, sound insulation, power windows, central locking, etc. The latter has only a small windscreen and cuts out options to save weight.

The type of donor car used as a basis also affects the resulting Murtaya. Standard naturally aspirated Impreza models can be used (AWD with about 150 hp (110 kW) and 5-speed manual transmissions). The next step up is a WRX model (usually with horsepower in the lower 200's and a 5-speed manual). The WRX STi donor will have an upper 200 hp (150 kW) flat-four and a 5/6-speed transmission. The highest spec donor would be an STi Type-RA or Type-R, which will have a six-speed transmission and a driver controlled central differential and limited-slip front and rear differentials. Adrenaline Motorsport sold Murtayas in even higher states of tune (up to and exceeding 400 hp).

Sample Models
Trim	Dry Weight	Power	Transmission	Estimated 0–60
Road Car	925 kg (2035 lbs)	276 hp	5-Speed	4.1 sec
Road Car	925 kg (2035 lbs)	350 hp	6-Speed	3.5 sec
Track Car	850 kg (1870 lbs)	395 hp	6-Speed	2.7 sec

== Sources ==
- Murtaya Sports Cars (MSC Ltd) Official Site
- Adrenaline Motorsport Official Site
- Middle Eastern Murtaya Distributor
- New Zealand Murtaya Owner Site
- Murtaya Owner Site
- The Auto Channel
- Japanese Performance Magazine, March 2007, "Flat-Four Flair"
