= Minari Engineering =

Former British automaker

Minari Engineering Ltd
- Company type: Limited company
- Industry: Automotive
- Founded: 1990; 36 years ago
- Founders: Andrew Borrowman and Sean Prendergast
- Headquarters: Staffordshire, UK
- Area served: UK
- Key people: Andrew Borrowman; Sean Prendergast
- Products: Automobiles; Self Assembly Automobile Kits
- Services: Composites; Vehicular Engineering

Minari Engineering Ltd. was a Limited company based in Staffordshire, UK. They manufactured two vehicles, the Minari Club Sport (otherwise known as the Mk1), and the Minari Road Sport (otherwise known as the Mk2). They specialised in producing the components required to build cars based upon the Alfa Romeo Alfasud and 33 running gear, with bodies mainly constructed from GRP. These could either be purchased in Kit form or through a build agent, Chameleon Cars. Around 130 Mk2 kits were sold before production finally stopped in 2000.

== Vehicles ==
Minari Engineering Ltd. produced two different vehicles during their tenure.

=== The Mk1 Club Sport ===
The Mk1 Club Sport was Minari Engineerings first production kit. The chosen donor car was the Alfa Romeo Alfasud, this was primarily chosen due to the large number of Alfasuds being scrapped due to corrosion, but still having well functioning drive trains. Only 13 Mk1 cars were produced, and not all of them were finished or road registered. The Mk1 cars had extremely shallow doors, made so by the deep sills designed to keep the monocoque rigid. The boot aperture opened to the rear of the car, making access challenging for larger items. The bonnet opened forward as one piece, enabling good access to the engine bay.

The headlights and windscreen were taken from a Citroen AX, along with a Ford Transit windscreen seal. The bonnet hinges are from the rear doors of a Land Rover Series III Safari and the rear lights are from an Alfasud Sprint.

=== The Mk2 Road Sport (RS) ===
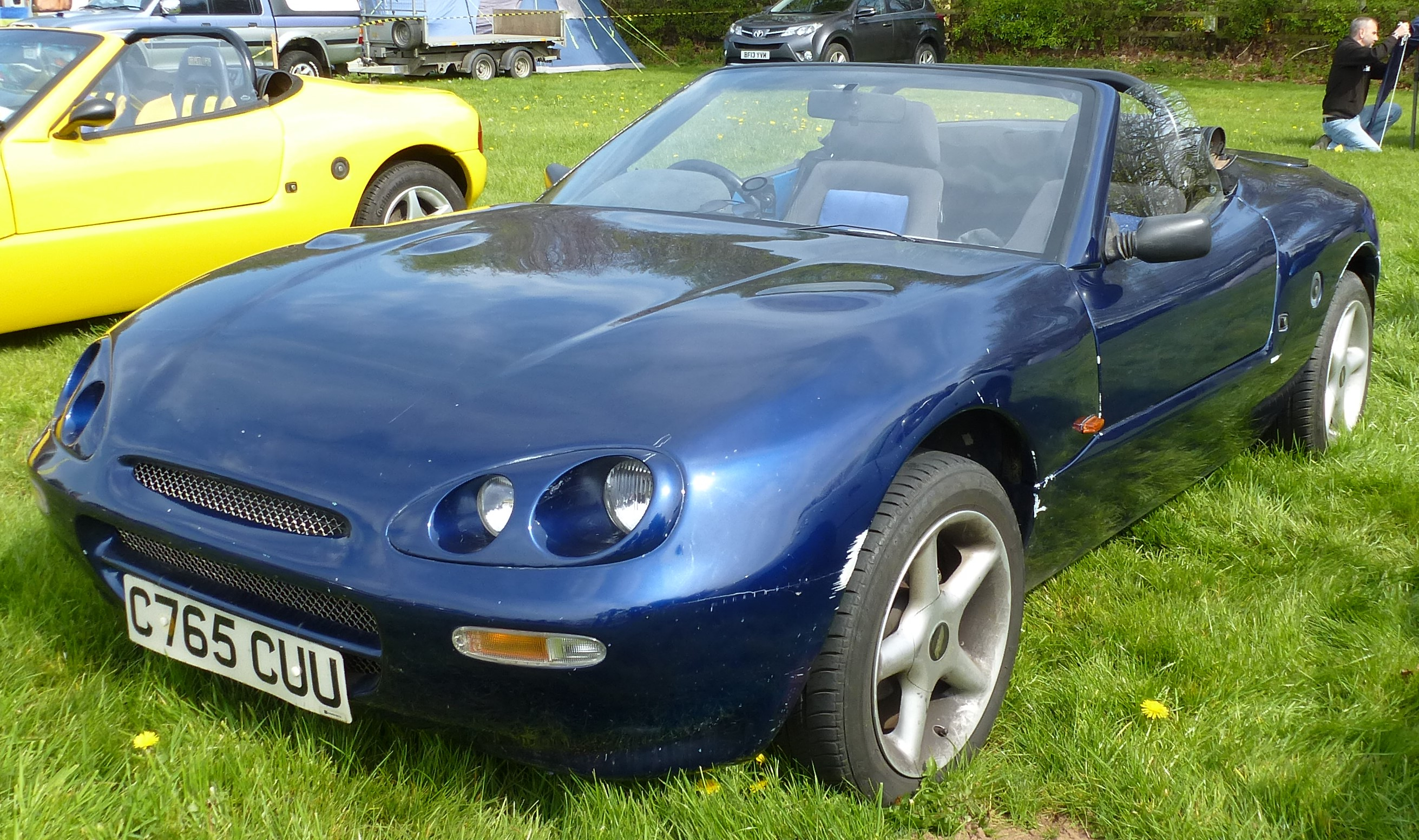
Minari RoadSport with Massey Ferguson/Ring Automotive headlights

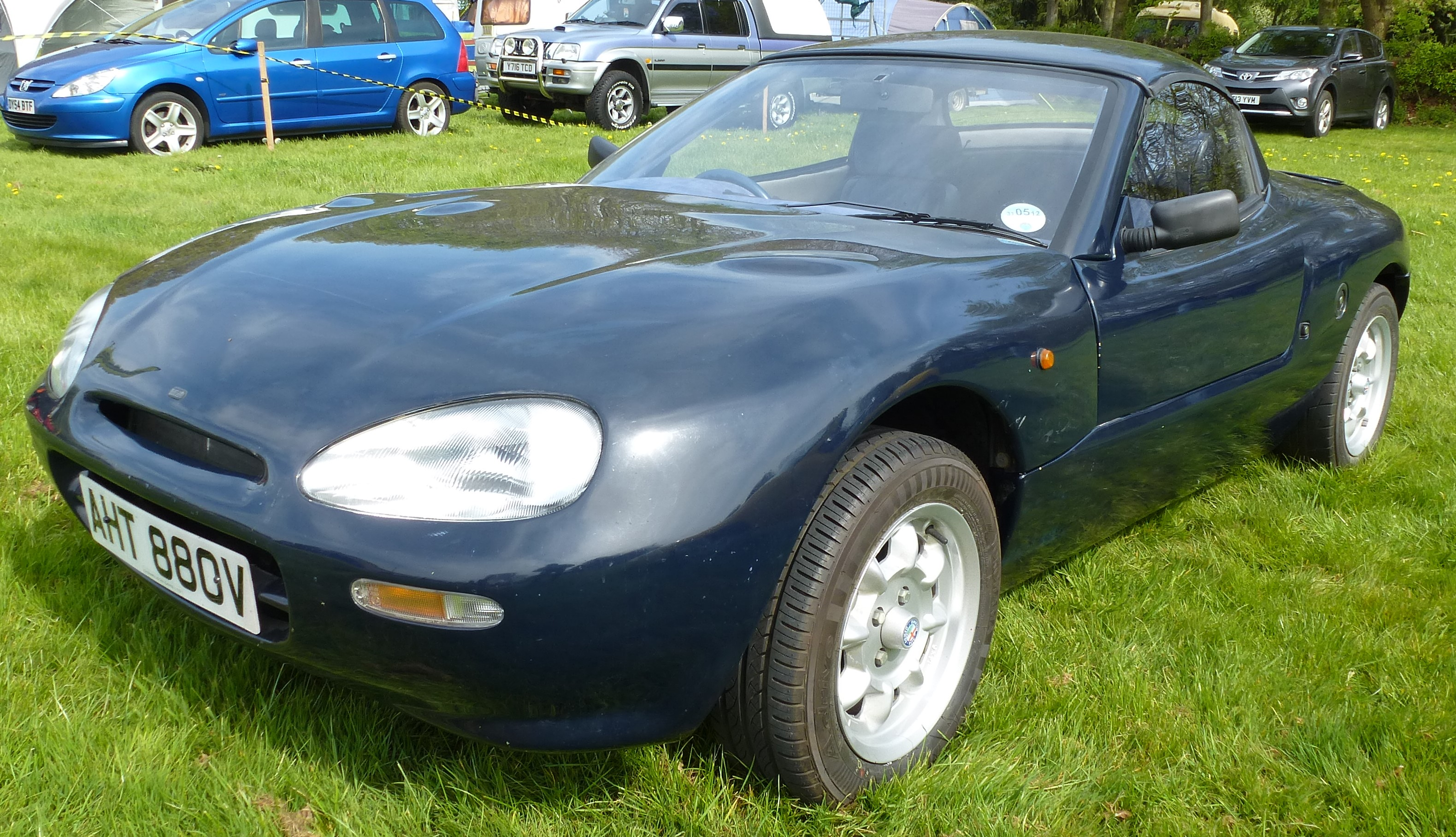
Minari RoadSport with Mazda Headlights

The Mk2 Road Sport was an evolution of the Mk1 design. The cars featured the same engine and suspension fitment (donated from an Alfasud or 33), with an improved monocoque structure and updated styling. Whereas the Mk1 Club Sport utilised the Alfasud rear lights, the Mk2 used Mazda 121 (1991-1998) rear lights, and Mazda MX-3 headlights. There was an option to utilise fibreglass shrouds and install main/dip beam headlights from a Massey Ferguson tractor (Massey part number 1672766M91) and Main-beam only lights by Ring Automotive (Ring part number BRL056), which some owners opted for.

The doors on the Mk2, whilst still shallow compared to most cars, were dropped further into the sill line to enable improved entry and egress to and from the vehicle, particularly when fitted with a roof. The Mk2 cars offered a hardtop option that had not been available on the Mk1's.

Whereas the boot on the Mk1 opened towards the rear of the car, the Mk2's opened in a more conventional fashion. As part of the improved monocoque design, an additional bulkhead had been added between the passenger cabin and boot space, meaning that the boot was substantially smaller on the Mk2 cars. The dashboard was also revised, and came in two forms depending upon which donor car was opted for. The Alfasud-based cars had a dashboard which came down and around the gear shifter and mated with the transmission tunnel. The Alfa 33 based cars had a more flat and up-to-date looking dashboard design.

The Mk2 retained use of the Citroen AX windscreen and Land Rover bonnet hinges, but opted for the door catches from a Fiat Panda. The external door release is embedded into the side body panel to the rear of the door as opposed to the door itself, making new entrants to the car occasionally somewhat confused.

=== The Mk2 Road Sport Racing (RSR) ===
The Mk2 Road Sport Racing was a lightweight version of the Road Sport, manufactured with the following modifications:

- Removal of Windscreen and A pillars
- Doors bonded into body shell
- Removal of Windows
- Small fly screen fitted
- Removal of superfluous items such as boot latches and interior trim
- Ultra light-weight bonnet & boot lid fitted as standard

Of the four RSR's manufactured, three were made of Fibreglass and one was made of Carbon Fibre. This is the only Minari known to have been manufactured from Carbon Fibre.

== Assembly ==
The Minari cars were designed to be self assembly kits completed by the customer and then registered with the DVLA, however after significant demand from customers a third party assembly company called Chameleon Cars was contracted to build turnkey cars. Donor cars were either supplied by the customer or sourced by Chameleon.

Later on turn key cars or unfinished projects could be built by a company called Arden Automotive, the build agent for the Murtaya.

== Evolution ==
As the source of donor Alfa Romeo's was drying up, investigations began into other vehicles that could be used as a donor. The obvious option was the Subaru Impreza as it also sported a flat-4 engine layout. The standard Minari, being front wheel drive, did not have a suitably sized transmission tunnel to accommodate the Subaru gearbox, and thus modifications were required. The project culminated in the production of the Delfino Feroce.

The Minari Engineering company eventually folded as the founders moved on to do different things. The tooling, moulds, and production rights of the Mk2 Road Sport were sold to Adrenaline Motorsport Limited who at the time were looking at evolving the work that had been completed on the Delfino Feroce. Having analysed the design of both the Minari Mk2 and the Delfino Feroce, they decided that a significant re-design was in order, and after some significant development effort the Murtaya was born.

== Ownership ==
The Minari Mk2 Road Sport production rights, tooling, and moulds were sold in 2011 to Paul Featherstone-Harvey of Peninsula Sports Cars. Peninsula continued to offer Minari kits for sale, and also offered spare parts to current owners. Following the death of Paul Featherstone-Harvey in late 2017, the production of the cars and any spare parts is currently on hold.

The Minari Mk1 Club Sport moulds were the subject of a legal case the details of which are unknown. The moulds themselves were later donated to a college motorsport engineering department, who after many years of storing the moulds, destroyed and disposed of them.
