= Mercedes-Benz Citan =

Panel van and leisure activity vehicle

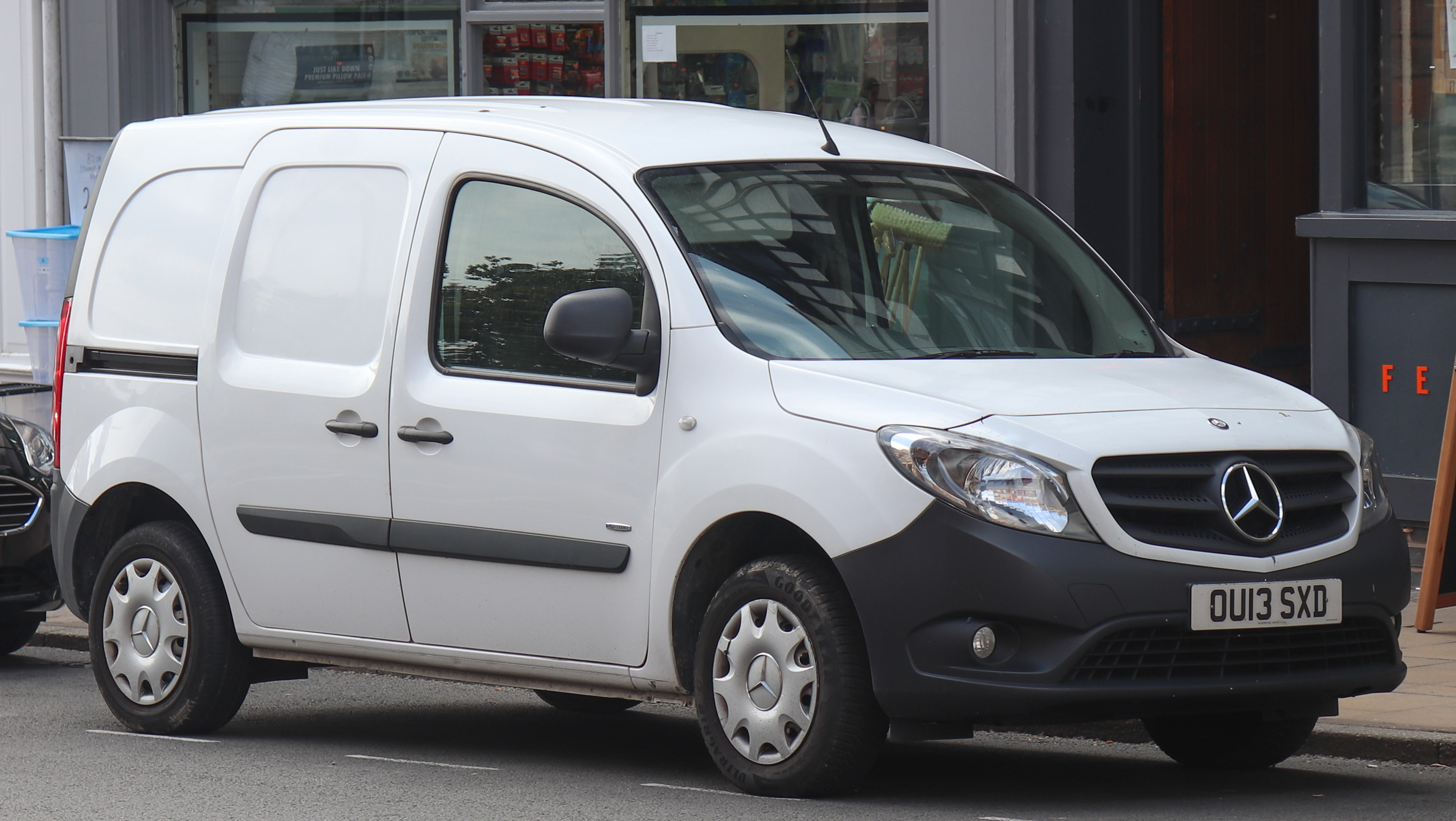

Overview
- Manufacturer: Renault
- Production: 2012–2026

Body and chassis
- Class: Panel van/Leisure activity vehicle (M)
- Layout: Front-engine, front-wheel-drive

Chronology
- Predecessor: Mercedes-Benz Vaneo

The Mercedes-Benz Citan is a panel van and leisure activity vehicle introduced as a badge-engineered variant of the Renault Kangoo in 2012 and marketed by Mercedes-Benz as the successor to the Vaneo compact MPV. In the Mercedes-Benz van lineup, the Citan is the smallest model offered, alongside the mid-size Vito (aka Viano, V-Class, and EQV) and large Sprinter.

== First generation (W415; 2012) ==
First generation
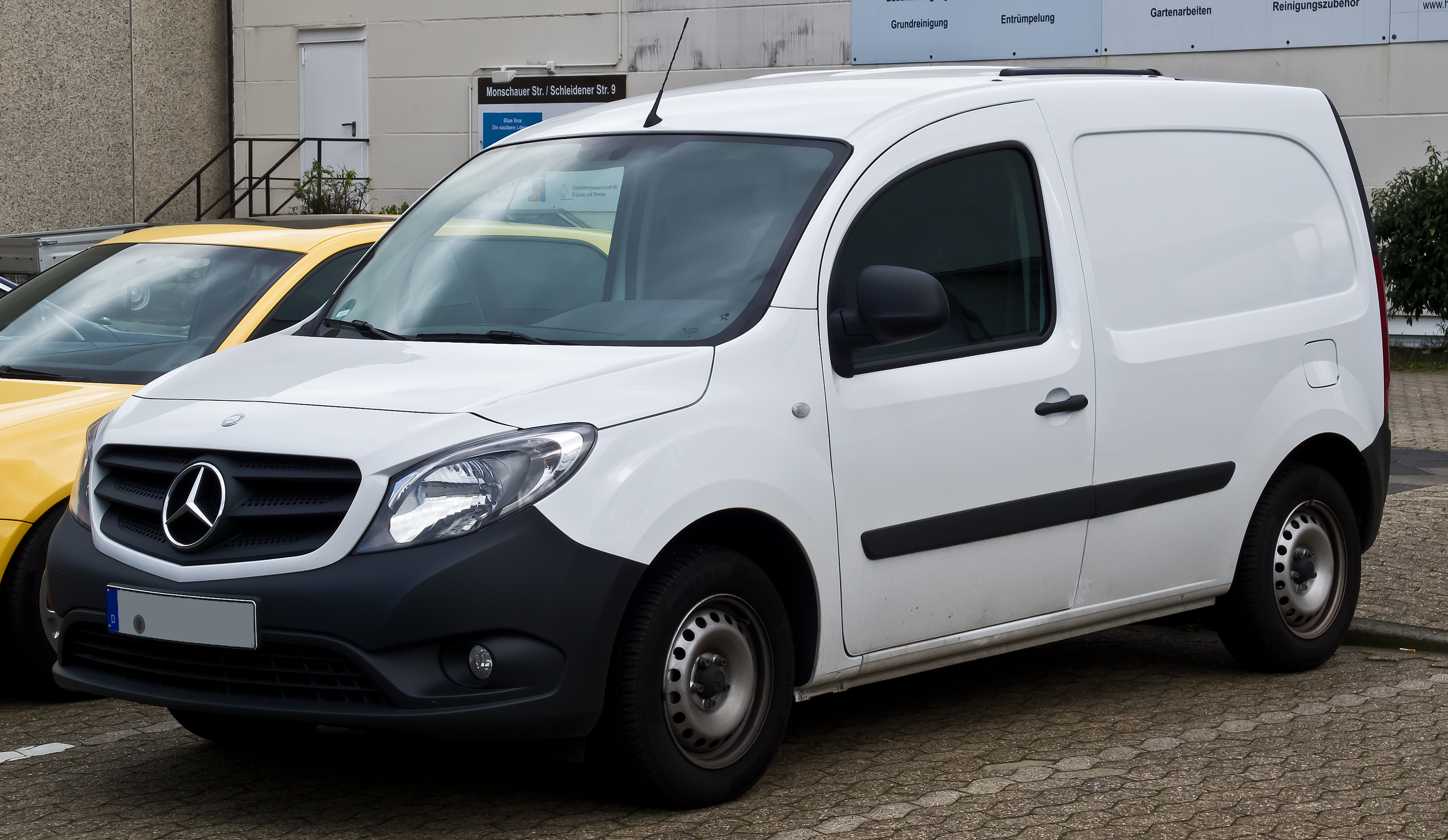

Overview
- Model code: W415
- Also called: Renault Kangoo; Nissan NV250
- Production: 2012–2021
- Assembly: France: Maubeuge (MCA)
- Designer: Felipe Gorsten

Body and chassis
- Body style: 4/5-door panel van 4/5-door MPV

Powertrain
- Engine: Petrol: 1.2 L M200 I4; Diesel: 1.5 L K9K/OM607 I4

Dimensions
- Wheelbase: 2,697 mm (106.2 in)
- Length: 3,937 mm (155.0 in) (Compact); 4,321 mm (170.1 in) (Long); 4,705 mm (185.2 in) (Extra Long/Dualiner)
- Width: 1,829 mm (72.0 in)
- Height: 1,809 mm (71.2 in)
- Curb weight: 1,295–1,465 kg (2,855–3,230 lb)

=== Production ===
The Citan, internally designated as the W415, is a result of the partnership between Daimler and the Renault-Nissan-Mitsubishi Alliance and is assembled by Renault subsidiary MCA in the northern French town of Maubeuge, alongside its twin, the Renault Kangoo.

The van is aimed at both the passenger car and light commercial vehicle markets and is the first Mercedes-Benz to be launched into the commercial vehicle market since the Vito in 1995. Daimler claim the leisure activity vehicle sector is the fastest-growing market area in Europe, accounting for 700,000 sales annually.

=== Bodystyles ===
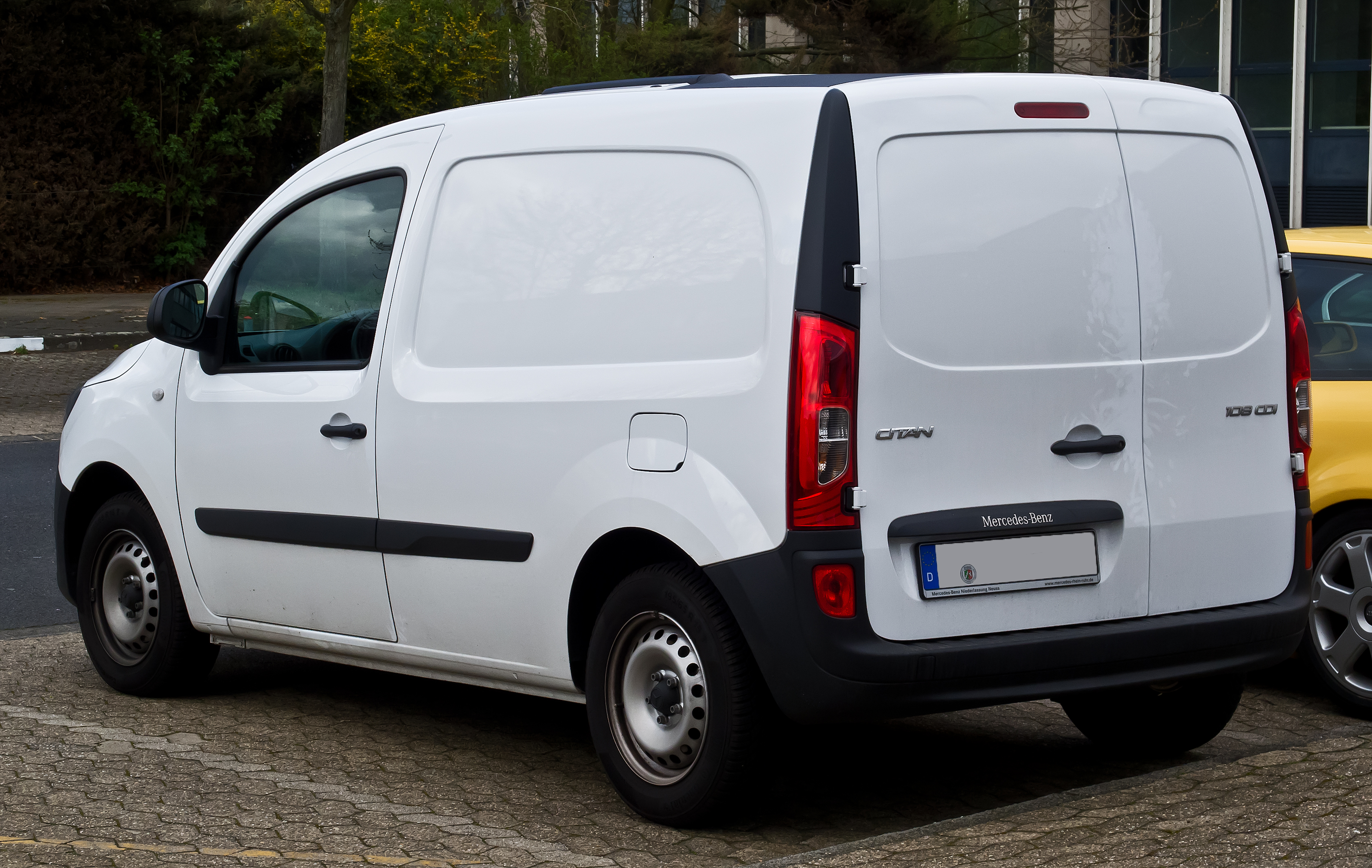
rear

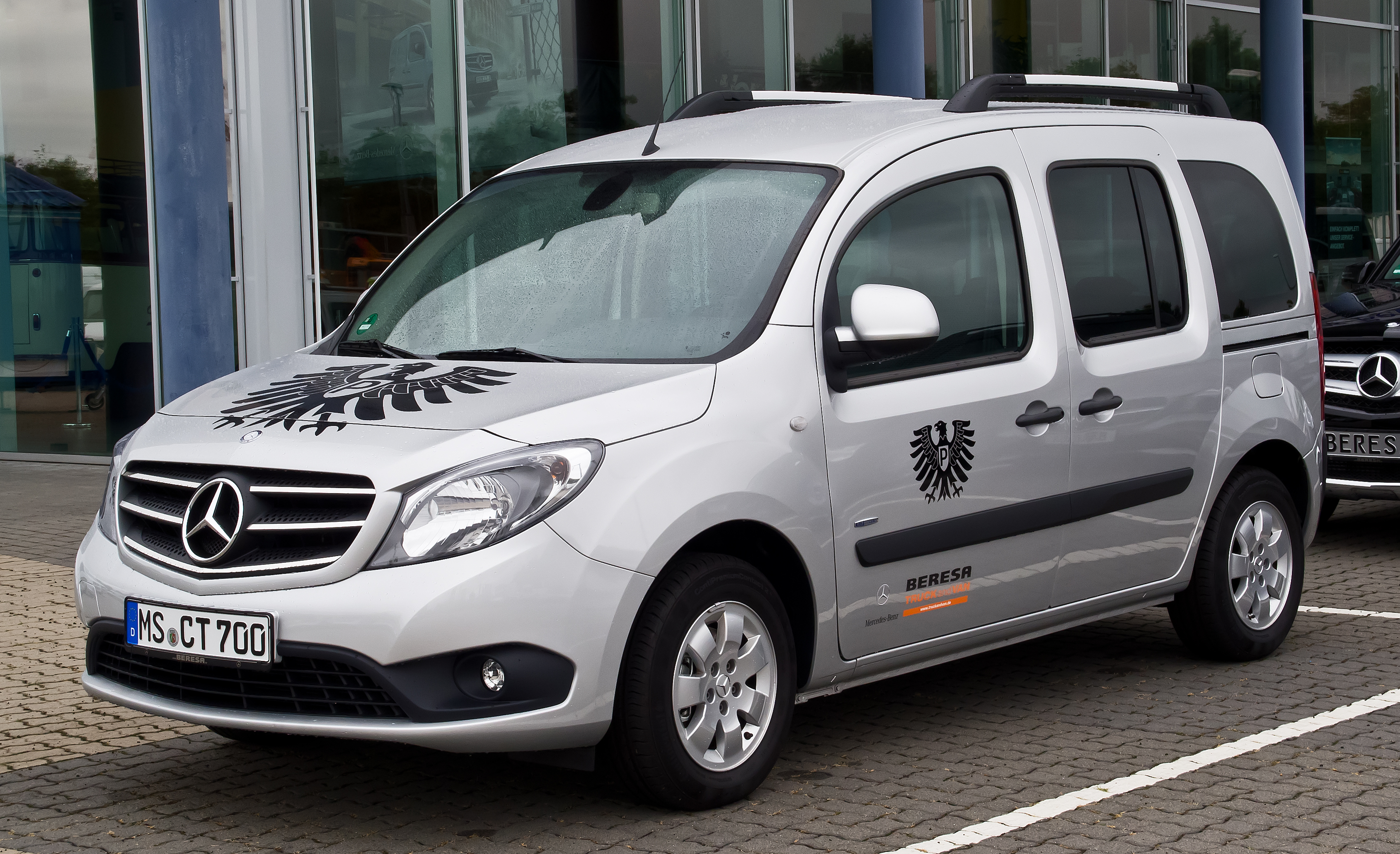
Mercedes-Benz Citan Traveliner

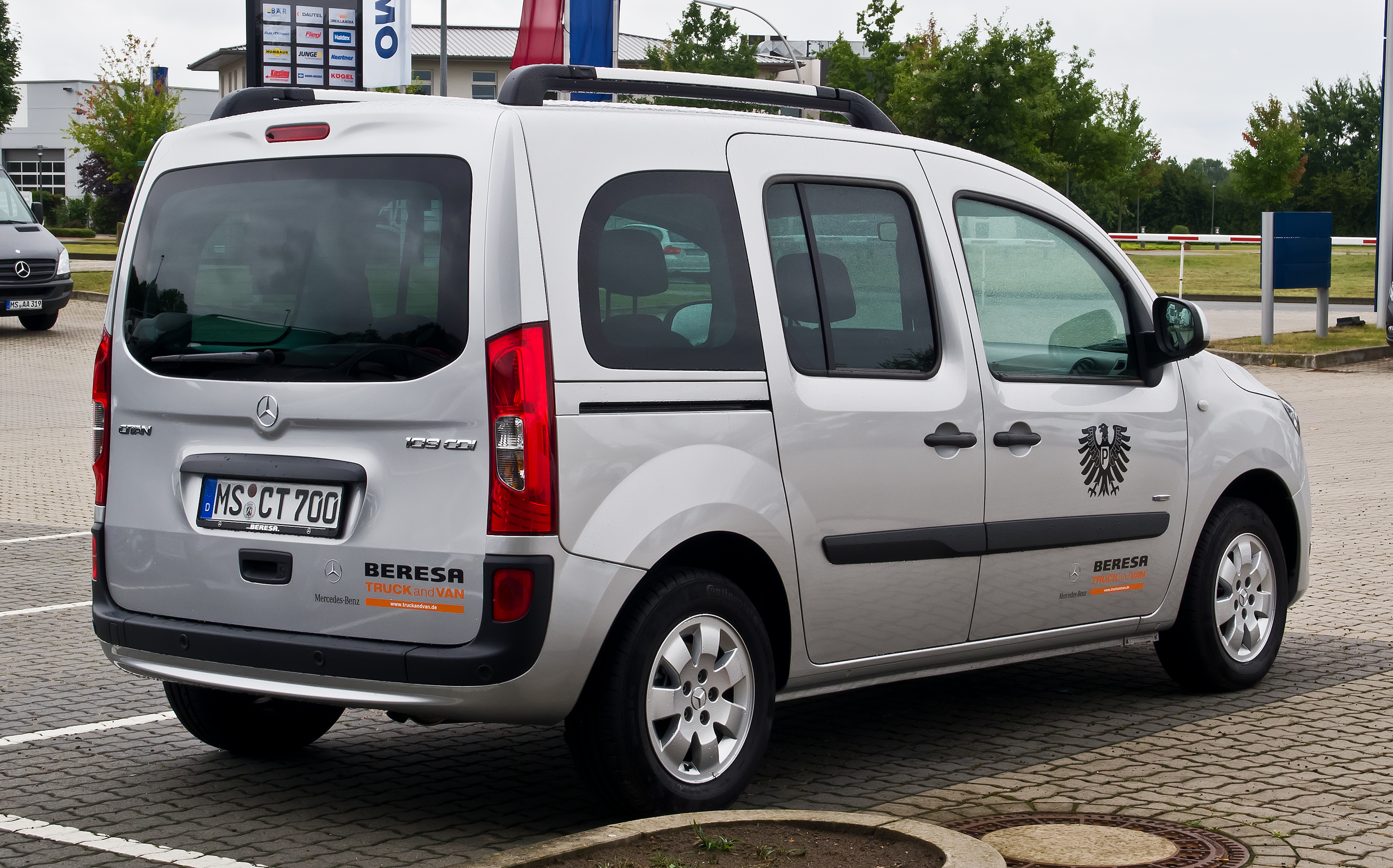
Mercedes-Benz Citan Traveliner (Rear)

The Citan is available in three different lengths: compact (3.94m), long (4.32m) and extra-long (4.71m). The vehicle comes in three bodystyles: Panel Van, Dualiner and Traveliner, with the Panel Van seating up to two people and both the Dualiner and Traveliner seating up to five.

=== Safety ===
The Citan Traveliner received four passenger stars in the Euro NCAP safety tests. The Mercedes-Benz Citan Kombi was first tested by Euro NCAP in April 2013, and was given a three star rating. Mercedes-Benz indicated at that time that they would improve the safety performance of the vehicle, especially the deployment of the side airbag and the installation of child restraints; and that they would provide a seatbelt reminder for the front passenger seat and make the speed limitation device comply with Euro NCAP's requirements. These changes are now in production and Euro NCAP has reassessed the vehicle. Several tests have been redone to assess the changes that Mercedes-Benz have made. Where the performance is not influenced by the changes, test results have been carried over from the original assessment.

Euro NCAP	Rating
Adult occupant:	3/5 stars
Pedestrian:	5/4 stars

=== Marketing ===
In 2012, Mercedes-Benz began a marketing campaign for the Citan with Richard Dean Anderson reprising his role as the popular TV show character MacGyver. The series of short films, titled MacGyver and the New Citan, is available on the official Citan website, from 18 September. The episodes were shot in Johannesburg, South Africa, in July 2012.

=== Engines list ===
Drivetrain data
Engine	Displacement	Model name	Engine power	Production	Transmission (manual)	Fuel consumption	CO_{2}
1.5 Turbodiesel; OM607 by Renault/Nissan	1,461 cc 89.2 cu in	108 CDI	75 PS (55 kW)	2012-2020	5-speed	61.4–65.7 mpg_{‑imp} (4.6–4.3 L/100 km)	112–119 g/km (6.4–6.8 oz/mi)
1.5 Turbodiesel; OM607 by Renault/Nissan	1,461 cc 89.2 cu in	108 CDI	80 PS (59 kW)	2020-2021	6-speed		
1.5 Turbodiesel; OM607 by Renault/Nissan	1,461 cc 89.2 cu in	109 CDI	90 PS (66 kW)	2012-2020	5-speed	60.1–65.7 mpg_{‑imp} (4.7–4.3 L/100 km)	112–123 g/km (6.4–7.0 oz/mi)
1.5 Turbodiesel; OM607 by Renault/Nissan	1,461 cc 89.2 cu in	109 CDI	94 PS (69 kW)	2020-2021	6-speed	50.4–62.8 mpg_{‑imp} (5.6–4.5 L/100 km)	117–147 g/km (6.6–8.3 oz/mi)
1.5 Turbodiesel; OM607 by Renault/Nissan	1,461 cc 89.2 cu in	111 CDI	110 PS (81 kW)	2017-2020	6-speed	62.8–64.2 mpg_{‑imp} (4.5–4.4 L/100 km)	115–119 g/km (6.5–6.8 oz/mi)
1.5 Turbodiesel; OM607 by Renault/Nissan	1,461 cc 89.2 cu in	111 CDI	115 PS (85 kW)	2020-2021	6-speed	50.4–61.4 mpg_{‑imp} (5.6–4.6 L/100 km)	122–146 g/km (6.9–8.3 oz/mi)
1.2 Turbopetrol; M200	1,197 cc 73.0 cu in	112	114 PS (84 kW)	2013-2021	6-speed	44.1–45.6 mpg_{‑imp} (6.4–6.2 L/100 km)	140–144 g/km (7.9–8.2 oz/mi)

== Second generation (W420; 2021) ==
Second generation
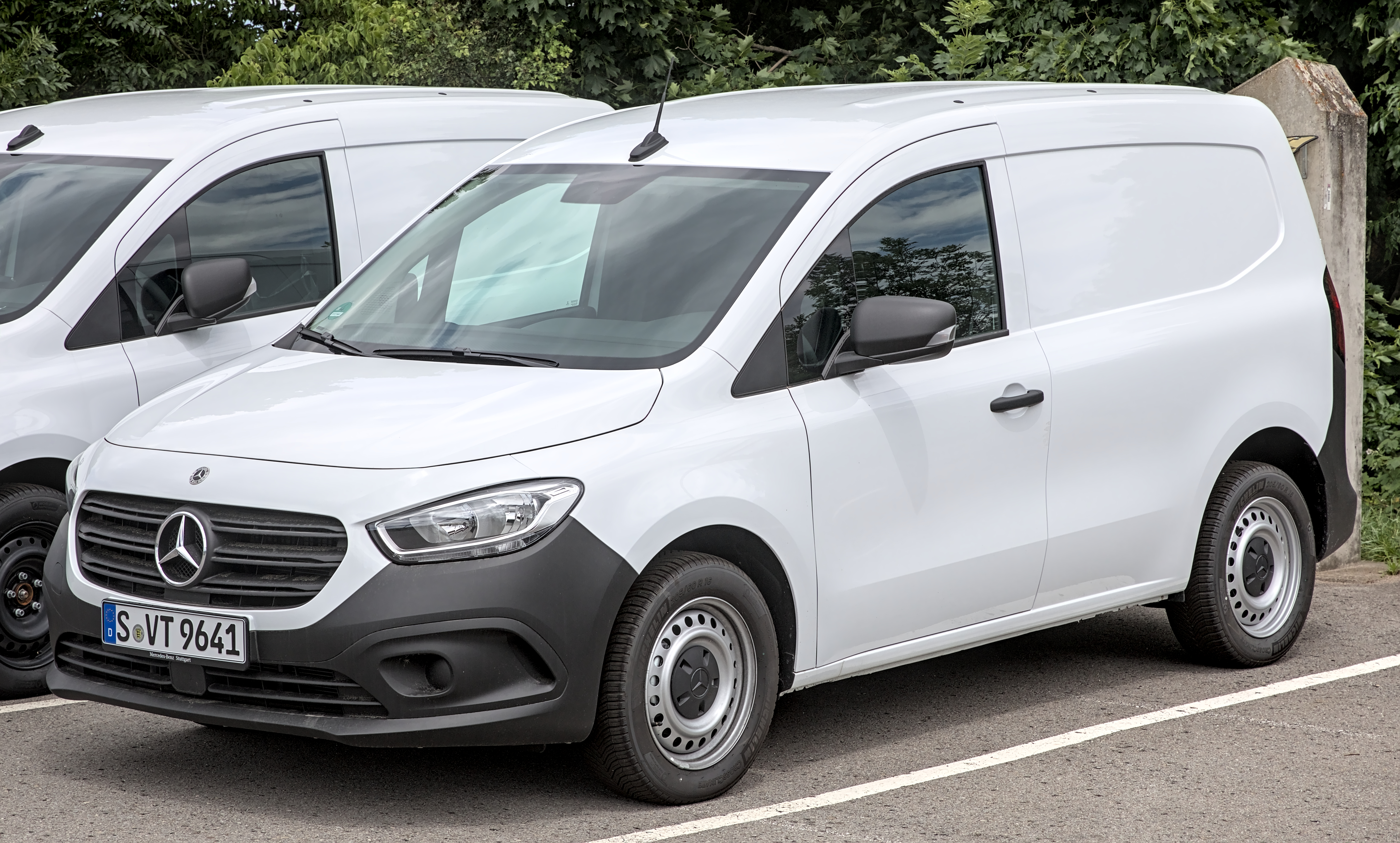

Overview
- Model code: W420
- Also called: Mercedes-Benz T-Class; Renault Kangoo; Nissan Townstar
- Production: 2021–2026
- Assembly: France: Maubeuge (MCA)
- Designer: Bram Olaerts; Mattia Lusci (T-Class)

Body and chassis
- Body style: 3/5-door panel van 5-door LAV
- Platform: Renault–Nissan CMF-CD platform

Powertrain
- Engine: Petrol: 1.3 L H5Ht/M282 turbo I4; Diesel: 1.5 L K9K/OM607 I4
- Transmission: 6-speed manual 7-speed DCT

Dimensions
- Wheelbase: 2,716 mm (106.9 in)
- Length: 4,498 mm (177.1 in)
- Width: 1,859 mm (73.2 in)
- Height: 1,852 mm (72.9 in)
- Curb weight: 1,556–1,715 kg (3,430–3,781 lb)

The second generation Citan was introduced in August 2021 in Panel Van and Tourer variants. Based on the third generation Renault Kangoo, the Citan (W420) rides on the CMF-CD platform, which also was developed into the T-Class MPV, replacing the existing Citan Traveliner and Citan Tourer.

The T-Class was released in April 2022, initially as the regular wheelbase version with seats for five people. A long-wheelbase variant with seats for seven in three rows is planned. The headlights are borrowed from the pre-facelift third gen B-Class.

=== Safety ===
In March 2024, the Citan van was awarded a Platinum rating from Euro NCAP due to its high level of active safety systems.

Euro NCAP test results Mercedes-Benz T160 Style (LHD) (2022)
Test	Points	%
Overall:	5 /5 stars	
Adult occupant:	34.7	91%
Child occupant:	45.8	93%
Pedestrian:	37.7	69%
Safety assist:	14.5	90%

=== Gallery ===
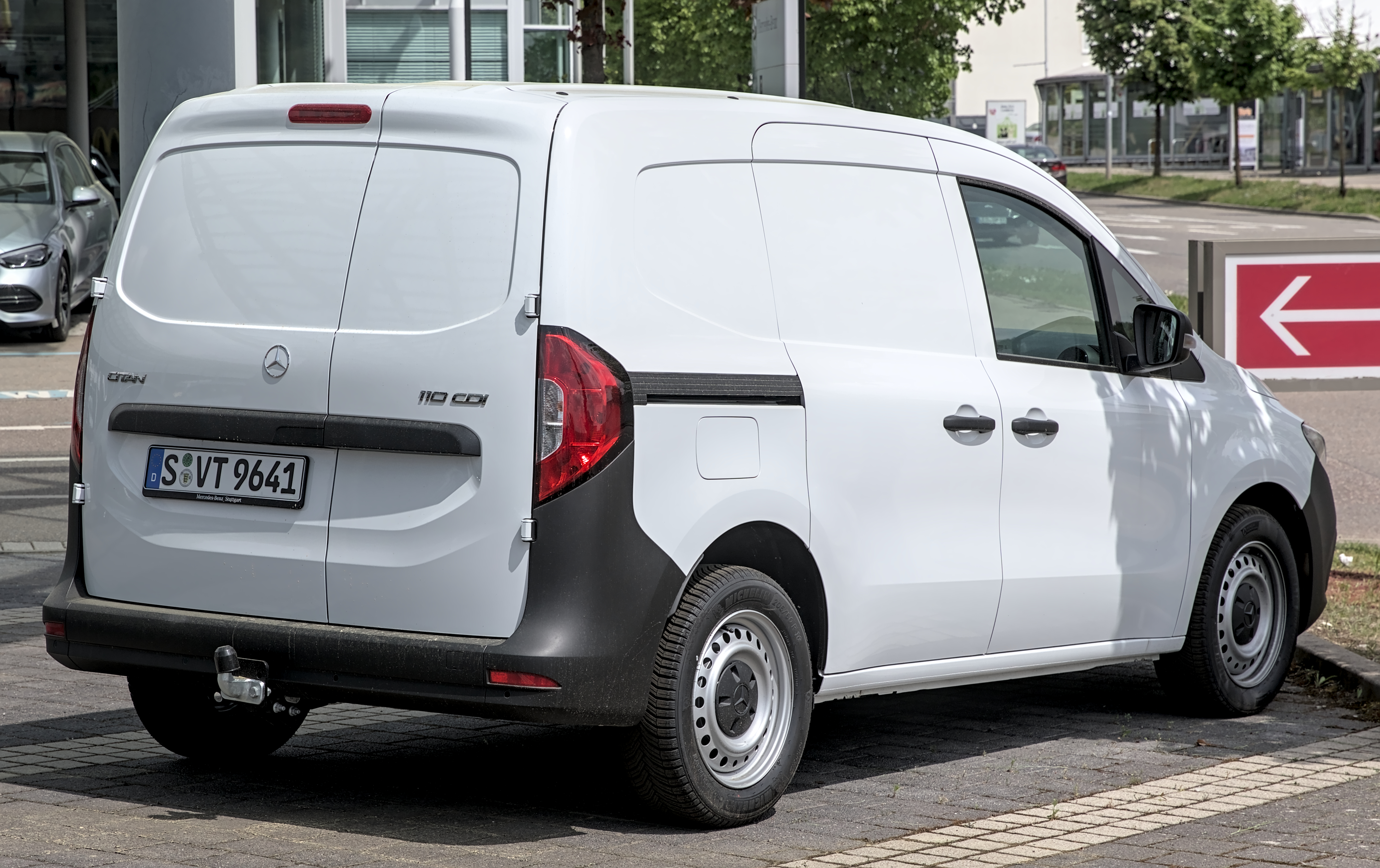
Rear view

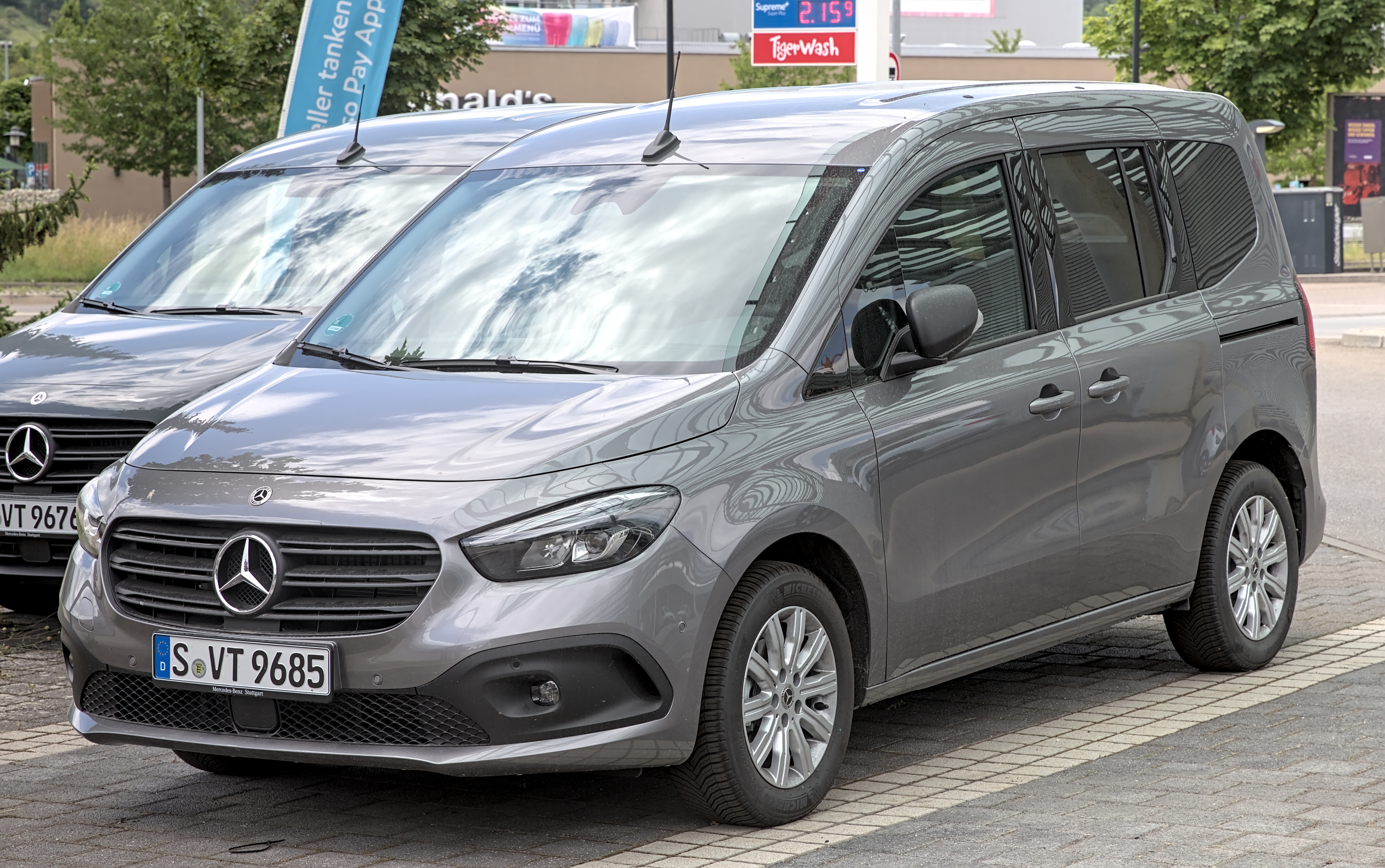
Mercedes-Benz Citan Tourer

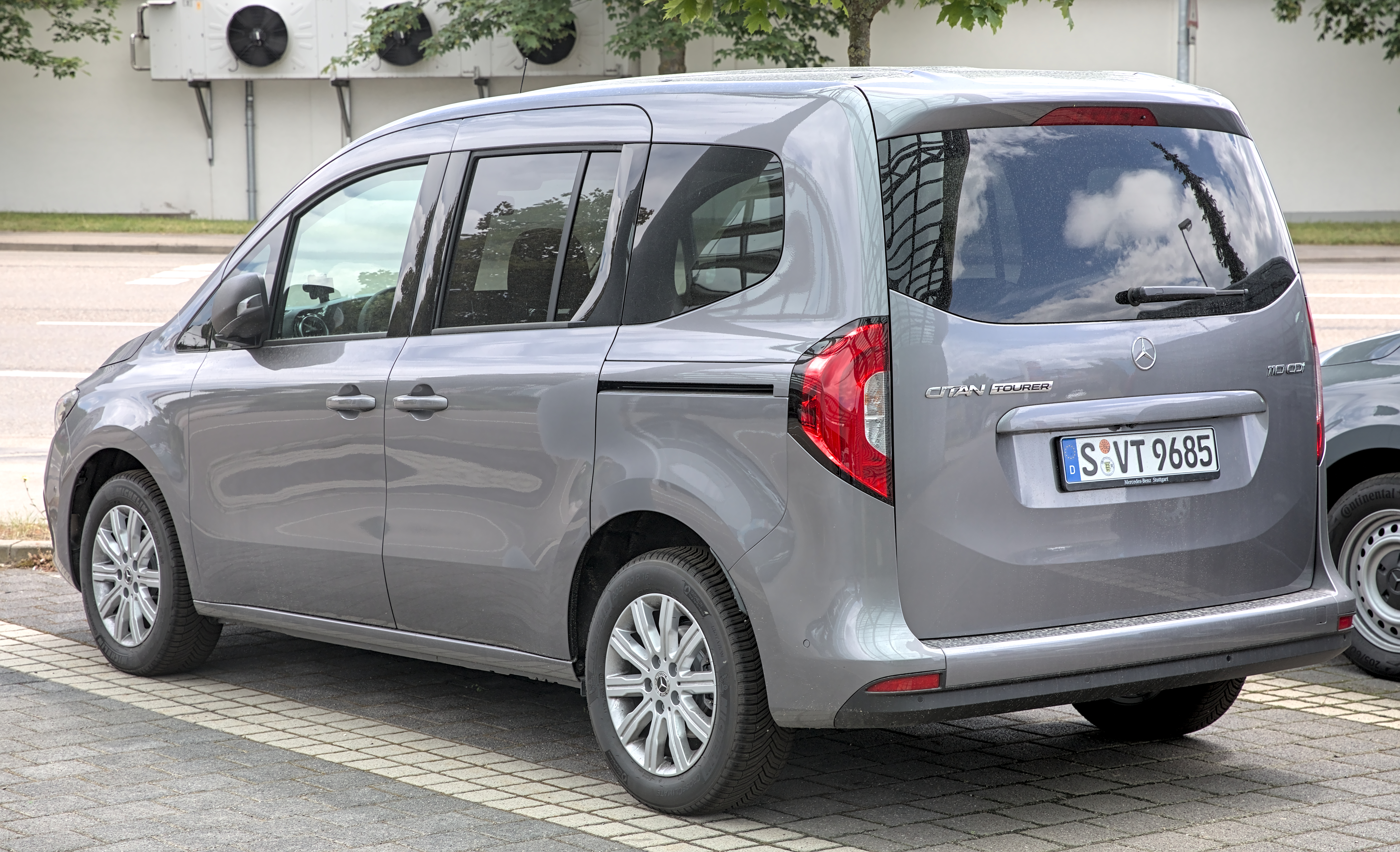
Mercedes-Benz Citan Tourer

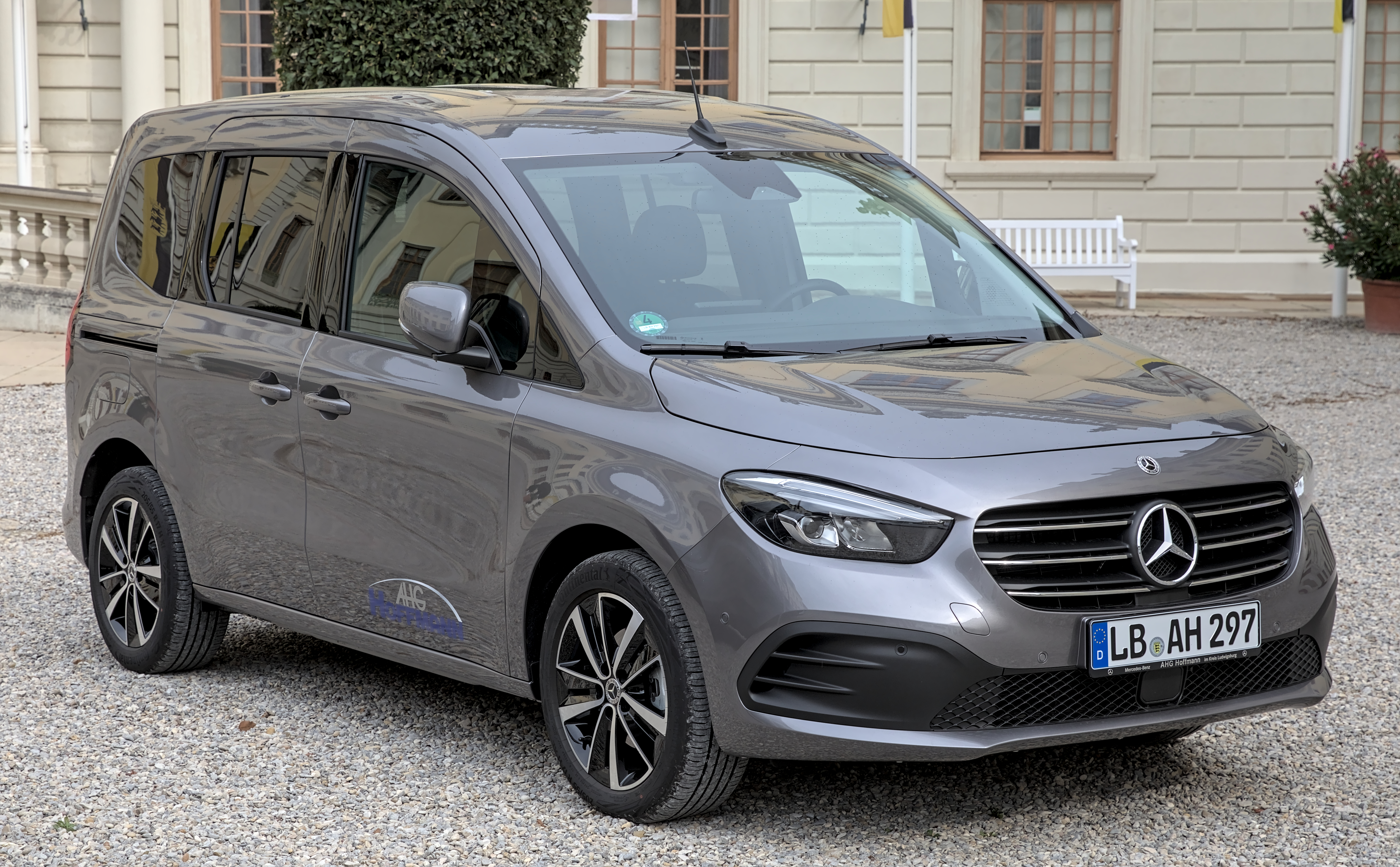
Mercedes-Benz T-Class

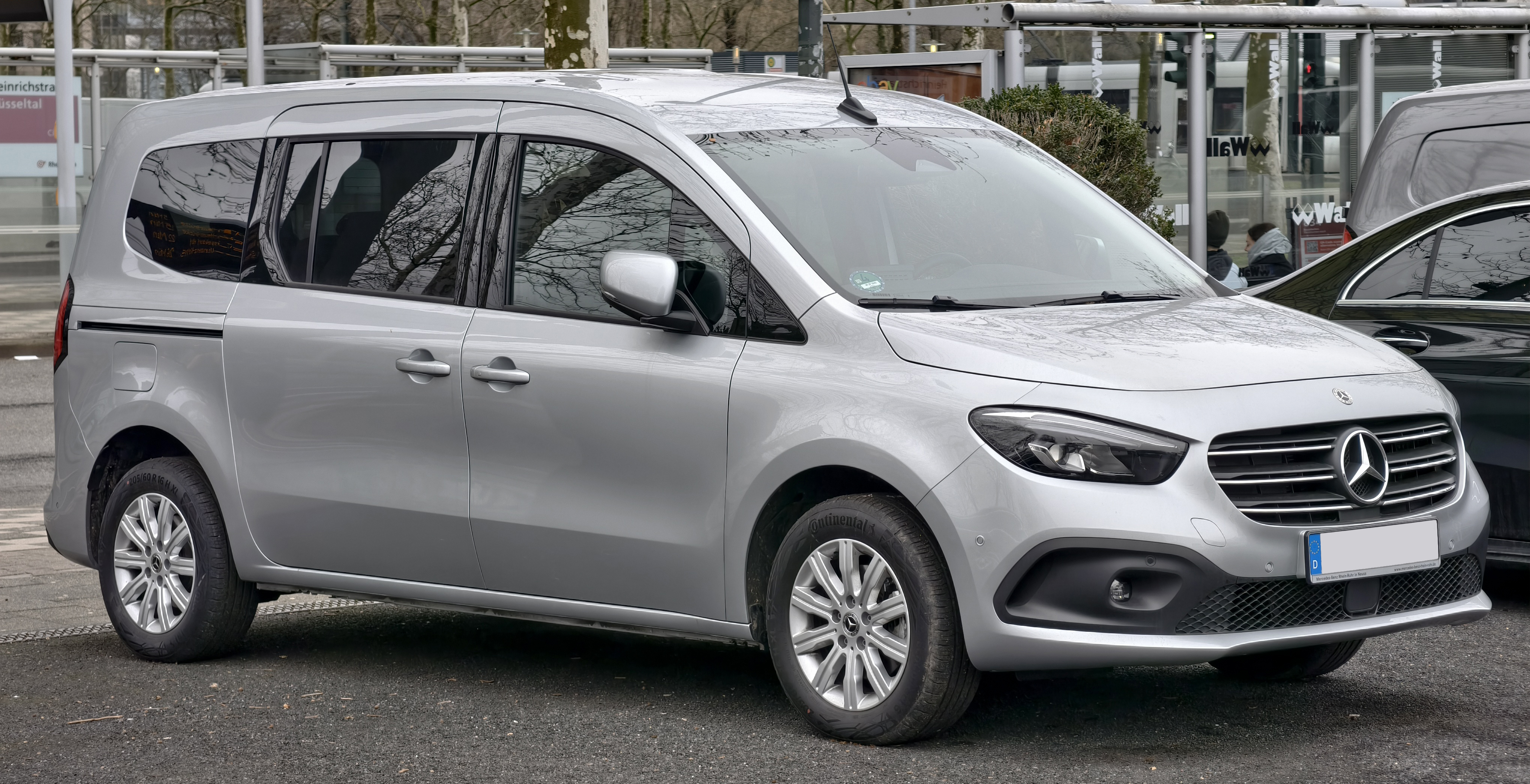
Mercedes-Benz T-Class LWB

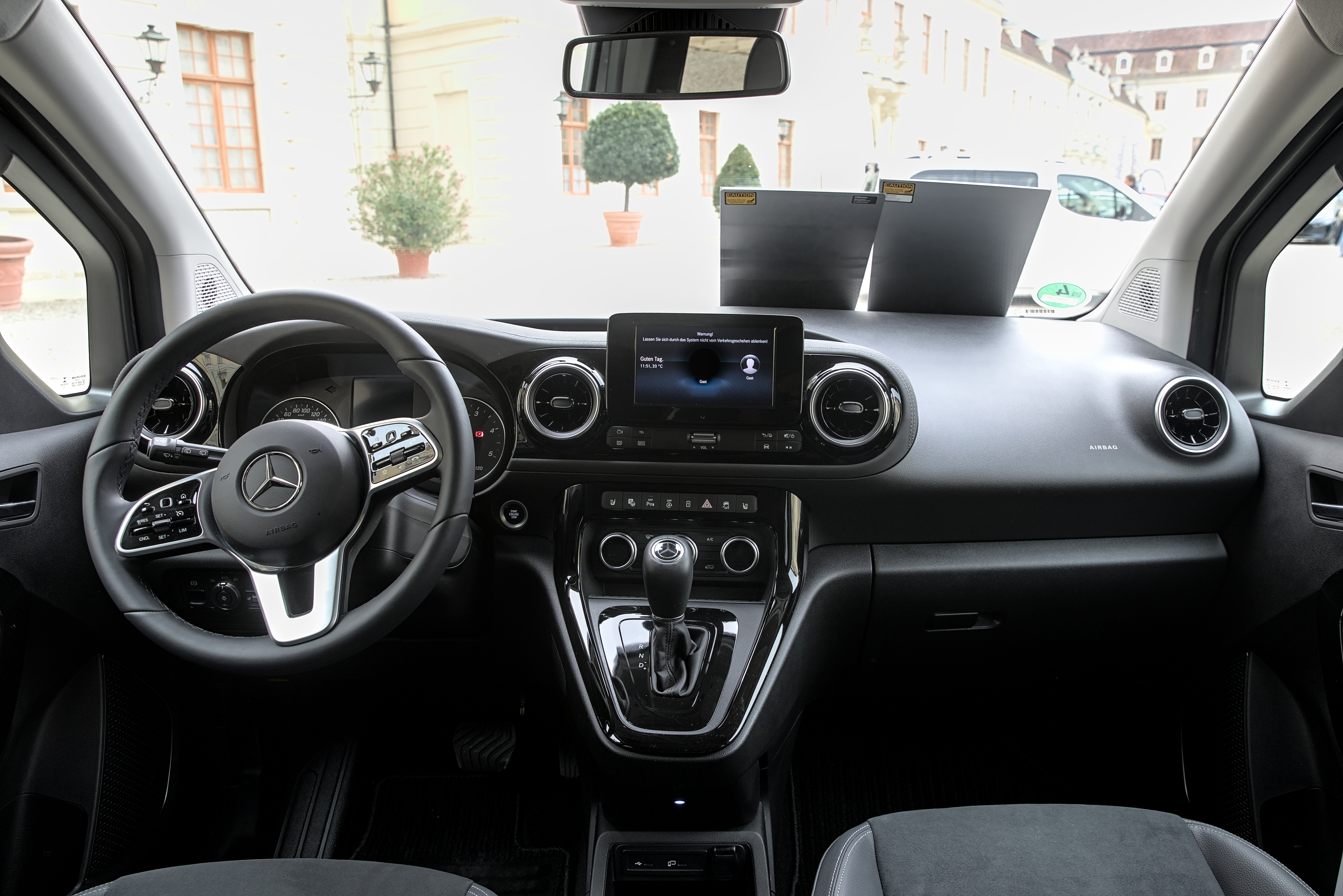
T-Class interior

=== Electric models ===
==== eCitan ====
The Mercedes-Benz eCitan is a battery-electric variant of the Citan LCV, announced in October 2021 alongside the regular Citan, with availability beginning the second half of 2022. The eCitan has an electric traction motor driving the front wheels, developing 90 kW (120 hp) and 245 N⋅m (181 lbf⋅ft), drawing from an eight-module lithium-ion battery carried under the floor forward of the rear axle with 44 kW-hr of usable capacity. The estimated range is 285 km (177 mi) under the WLTP combined driving cycle. The standard on-board charger has a capacity of 11 kW (AC), but as an option, a 22 kW (AC) / 75 kW (DC) charger can be ordered, which gives the vehicle a CCS Combo 2 port.

==== EQT ====
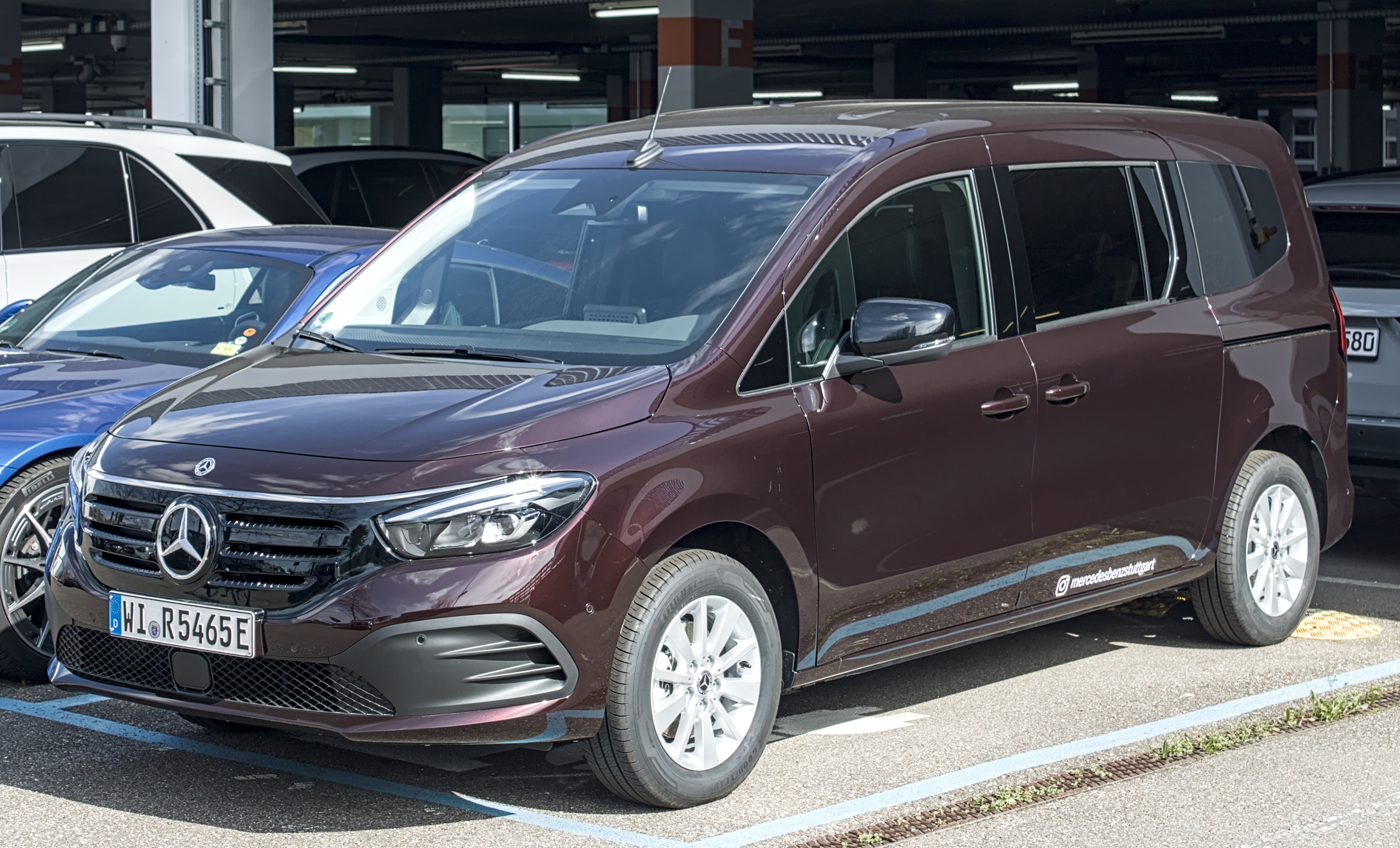
Mercedes-Benz EQT production model

The Mercedes-Benz EQT is a battery-electric variant of the T-Class MPV, first shown as a concept at IAA 2021.

Concept EQT, IAA 2021
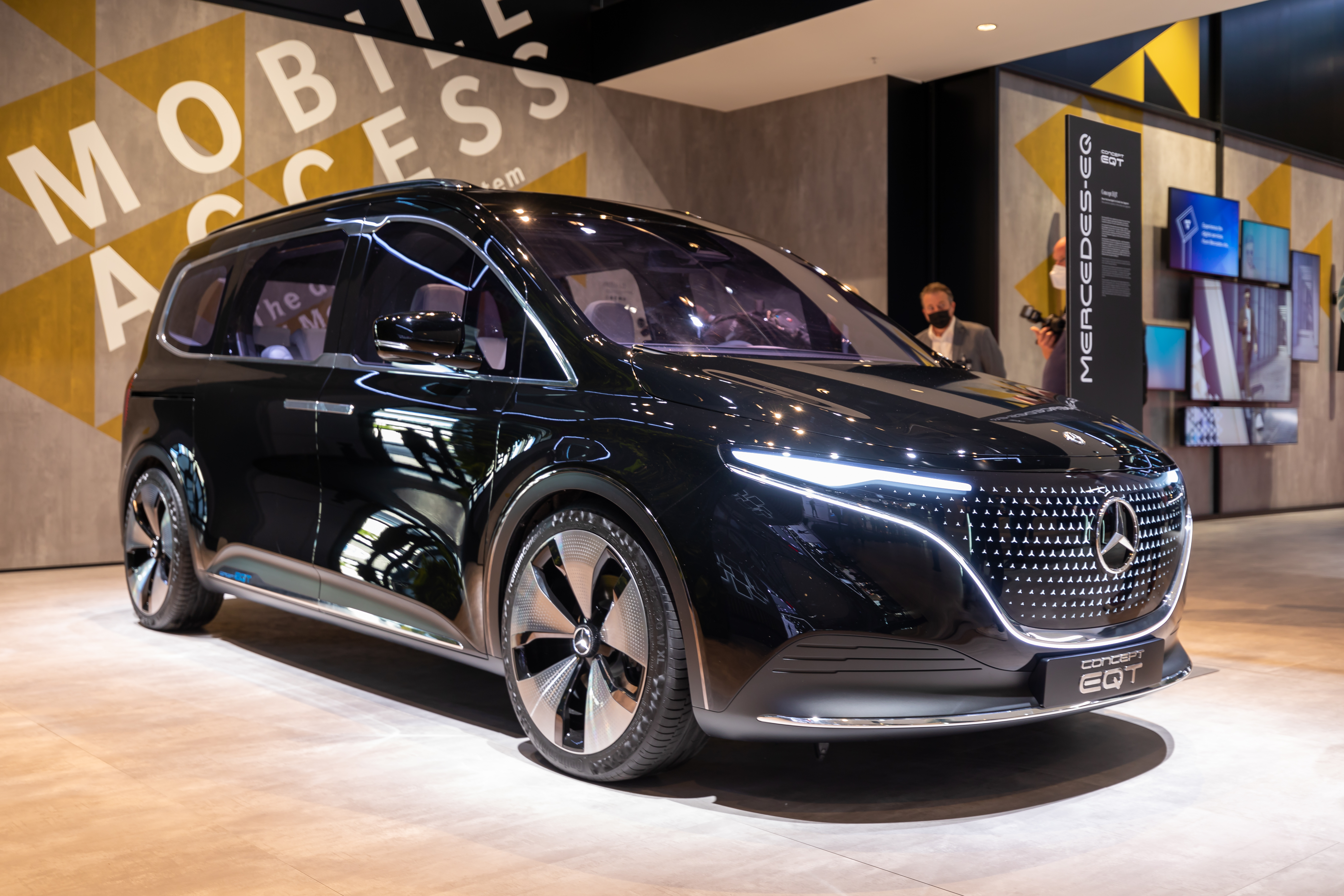
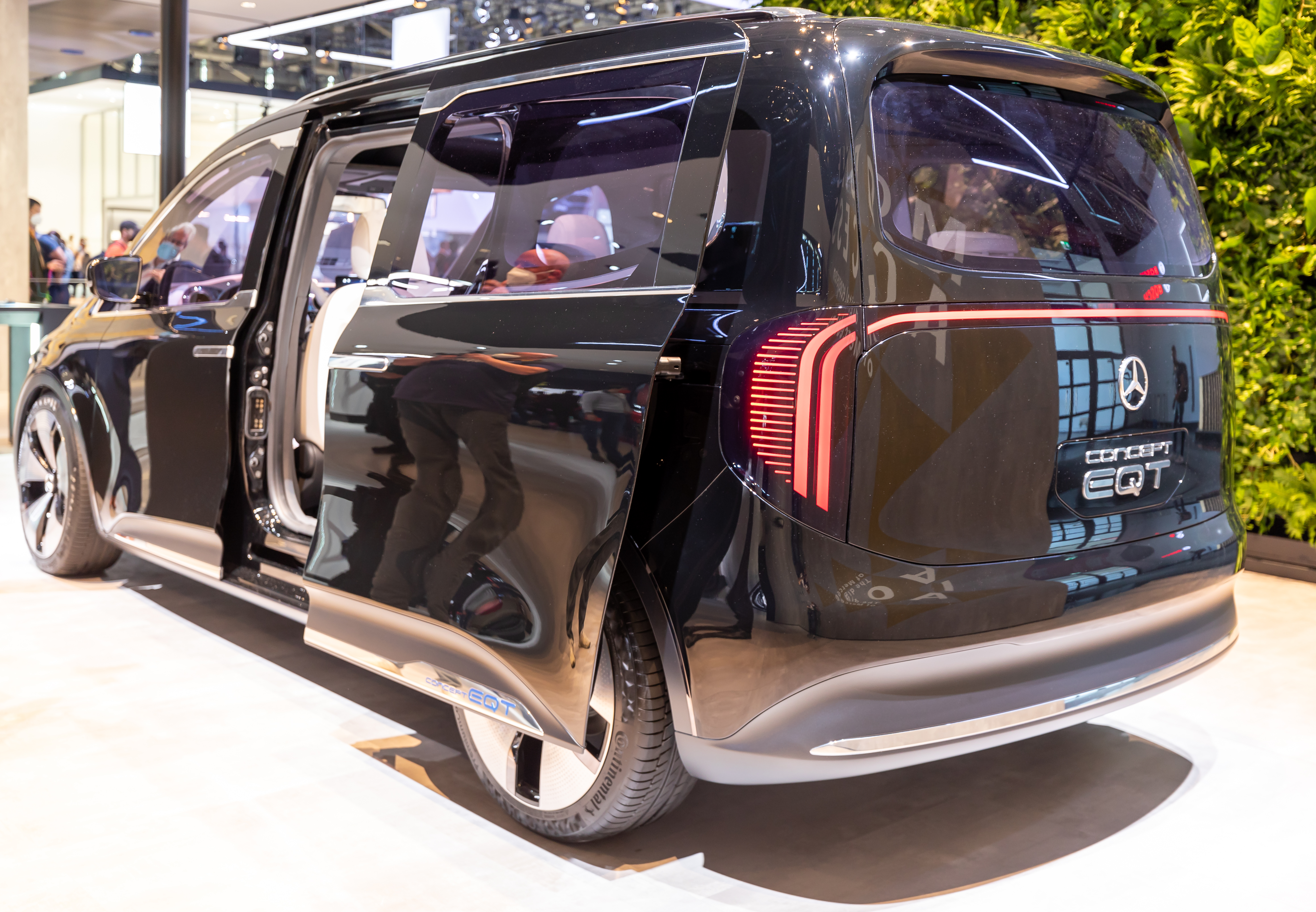

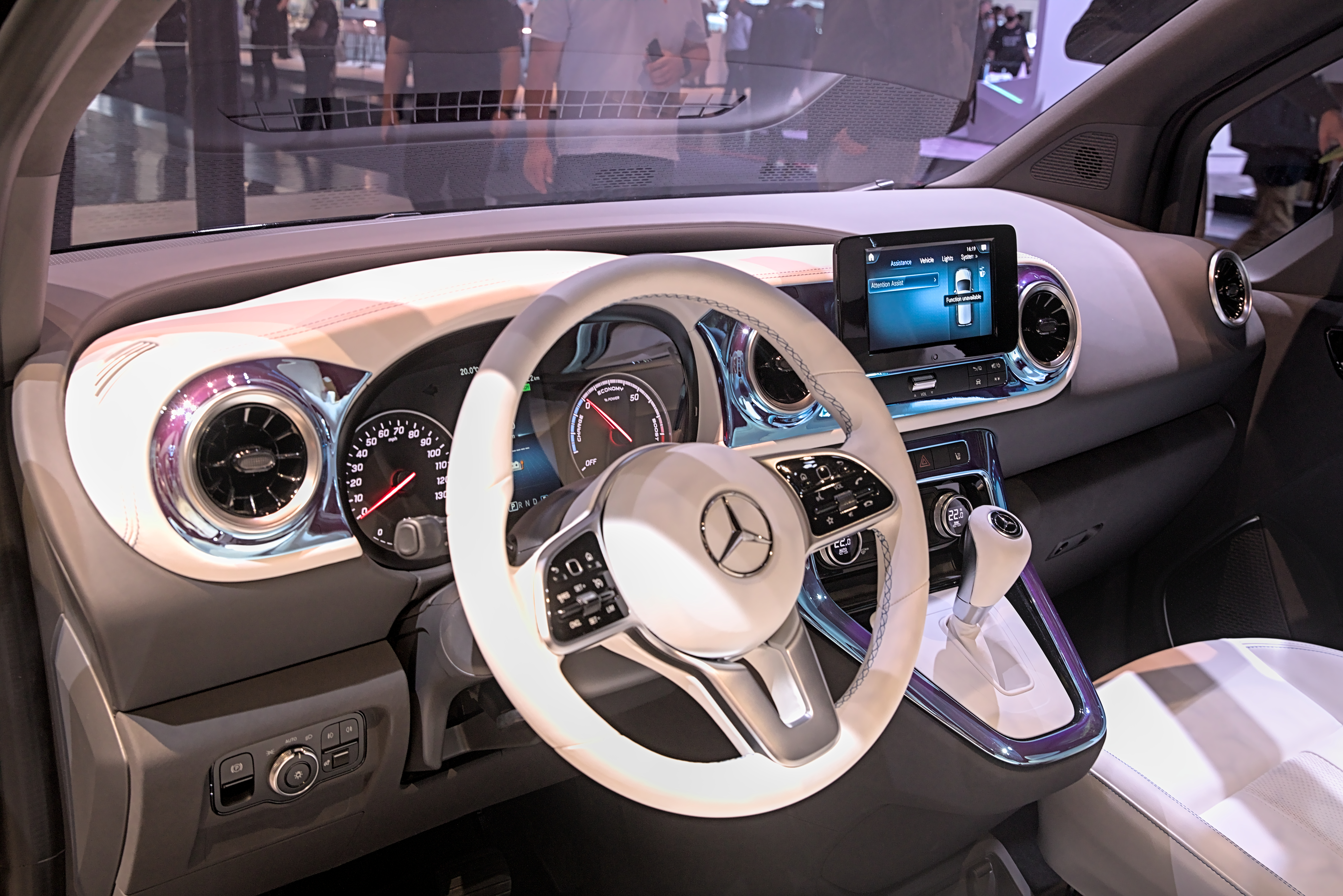
Interior

The production EQT was unveiled in December 2022, equipped with a drivetrain identical to that of the contemporary Kangoo E-Tech. This includes a 45 kW h battery that feeds an electric traction motor which develops 90 kW (122 PS; 121 hp) and 245 N⋅m (181 lbf⋅ft) of torque, giving it an estimated range of 282 km (175 mi). It was introduced initially in the short-wheelbase version.

=== Engines ===
Engines
Model	Engine	Displacement	Valvetrain	Fuel system	Max. power at rpm	Max. torque at rpm	Gearbox	Years	Consumption	CO_{2}
Petrol engines
110	Nissan H5Ht	1,332 cc	DOHC 16v	Direct injection	102 PS (75 kW; 101 bhp) @ 4,500 rpm	200 N⋅m (148 lb⋅ft) @ 1,500 rpm	6 speed manual	2021–present	7.2–6.5 L/100 km (39.2–43.5 mpg_{‑imp})	162–147 g/km (9.2–8.3 oz/mi)
113	Nissan H5Ht	1,332 cc	DOHC 16v	Direct injection	131 PS (96 kW; 129 bhp) @ 5,000 rpm	240 N⋅m (177 lb⋅ft) @ 1,600 rpm	6 speed manual	2021–present	7.1–6.4 L/100 km (39.8–44.1 mpg_{‑imp})	161–146 g/km (9.1–8.3 oz/mi)
Diesel engines
108CDI	Renault K9K	1,461 cc	SOHC 8v	Common rail direct injection	75 PS (55 kW; 74 bhp) @ 3,750 rpm	230 N⋅m (170 lb⋅ft) @ 1,750 rpm	6 speed manual	2021–present	5.4–5.0 L/100 km (52.3–56.5 mpg_{‑imp})	143–131 g/km (8.1–7.4 oz/mi)
110CDI	Renault K9K	1,461 cc	SOHC 8v	Common rail direct injection	95 PS (70 kW; 94 bhp) @ 3,750 rpm	260 N⋅m (192 lb⋅ft) @ 1,750 rpm	6 speed manual	2021–present	5.6–5.0 L/100 km (50.4–56.5 mpg_{‑imp})	146–131 g/km (8.3–7.4 oz/mi)
112CDI	Renault K9K	1,461 cc	SOHC 8v	Common rail direct injection	116 PS (85 kW; 114 bhp) @ 3,750 rpm	270 N⋅m (199 lb⋅ft) @ 1,750 rpm	6 speed manual	2021–present	5.8–5.3 L/100 km (48.7–53.3 mpg_{‑imp})	153–138 g/km (8.7–7.8 oz/mi)
Electric
Model	Charger	Battery	Range	Motor	Max. power at rpm	Max. torque at rpm	Gearbox	Years	Consumption	CO_{2}
eCitan / EQT	22 kW (AC); 80 kW (DC)	Li-ion, 44 kW-hr (net)	186 mi (299 km) (WLTP)	synchronous with coiled rotor	121 / 60 PS (89 / 44 kW; 119 / 59 bhp) Normal/Eco	245 N⋅m (181 lb⋅ft)	Single-speed reduction gear	2022–present	–	0 g/km (0 oz/mi)

=== Discontinuation ===
In April 2025, Mercedes-Benz executives announced the discontinuation of the Mercedes-Benz Citan, T-Class, eCitan and EQT in 2026.
