= Mercedes-Benz M200 engine =

Mercedes-Benz M200

Overview
- Manufacturer: Mercedes-Benz
- Production: 2013–2021

Layout
- Configuration: Inline-four engine
- Displacement: 1.2 L (1,192 cc)
- Cylinder bore: 72 mm (2.83 in)
- Piston stroke: 73.2 mm (2.88 in)
- Cylinder block material: Aluminium alloy
- Cylinder head material: Aluminium alloy
- Valvetrain: DOHC 4 valves per cyl. VVT

Combustion
- Turbocharger: Single-turbo
- Fuel system: Direct injection
- Fuel type: Gasoline
- Cooling system: Water cooled

Output
- Power output: 84 kW (114 PS; 113 hp)
- Specific power: 70.5 kW (95.9 PS; 94.5 hp) per litre
- Torque output: 190 N⋅m (140 lb⋅ft)

The M200 is a turbocharged inline-four engine produced since 2013 by Mercedes-Benz.

== Design ==
The engine is based on the Renault H5Ft engine, marketed as Energy TCe 115, due to Daimler AG's collaboration with the Renault–Nissan–Mitsubishi Alliance. The M200 has a relatively square shape with a bore and stroke of 72 mm × 73.2 mm (2.83 in × 2.88 in). It features 4 valves per cylinder, variable valve timing, a start-stop system, a three-way catalytic converter, and iron-carbon alloy coating on the cylinder walls to reduce friction. It is also compliant with the Euro 5 emission standards.

== Models ==
Engine	Power	Torque	Years
M200; DE12 LA	84 kW (114 PS; 113 hp) at 4,500 rpm	190 N⋅m (140 lb⋅ft) at 2,000–4,000 rpm	2013–

=== M200 DE12 LA ===
- 2013–present W415 Citan 112 BlueEFFICIENCY
