= Monocoque =

Structural design that supports loads through an object's external skin

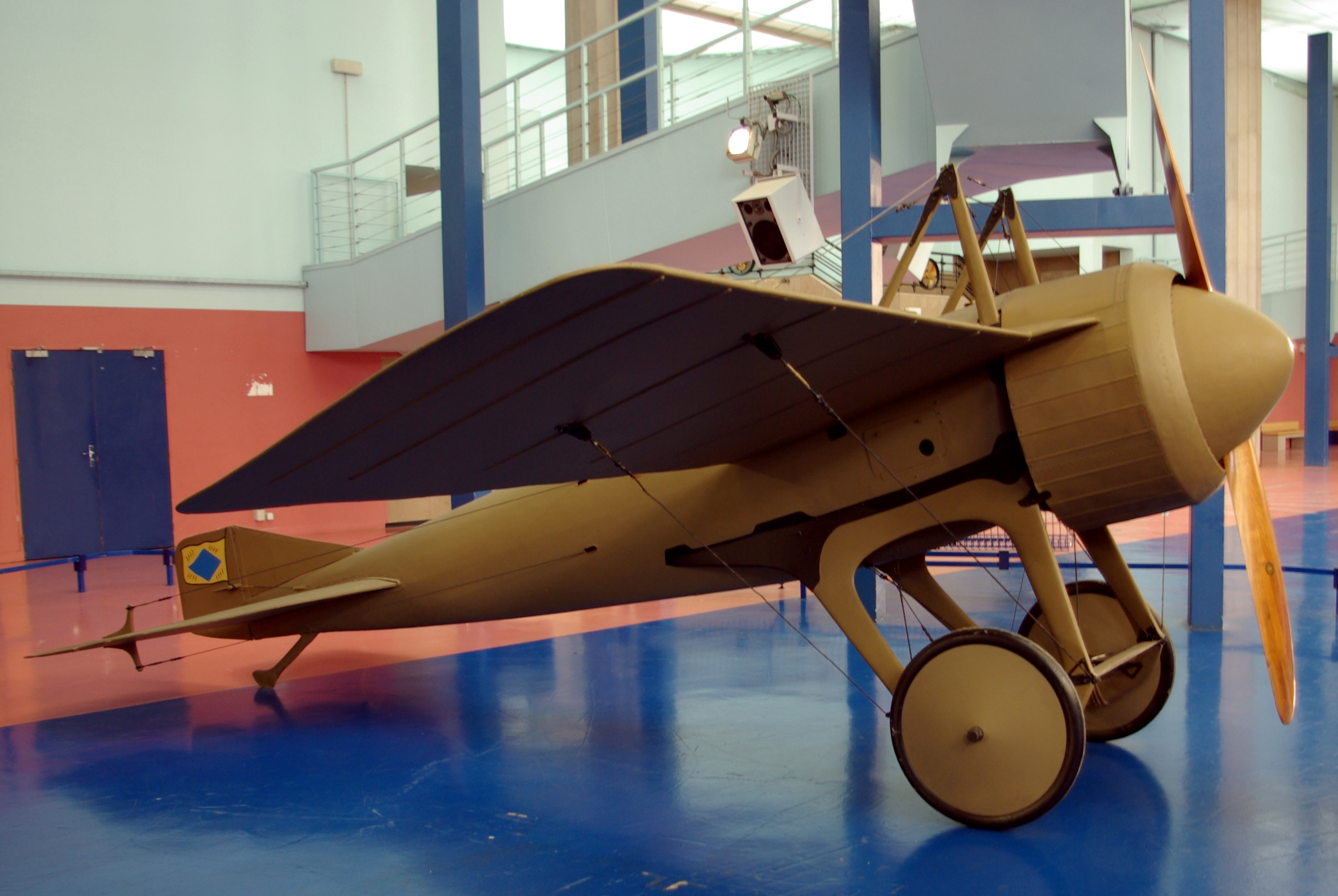
Deperdussin Monocoque, with wooden shell construction

Monocoque (/ˈmɒnəkɒk, -koʊk/ MON-ə-ko(h)k), also called structural skin, is a structural system in which loads are supported by an object's external skin, in a manner similar to an egg shell. The word monocoque is a French term for "single shell".

First used for boats, a true monocoque carries both tensile and compressive forces within the skin and can be recognised by the absence of a load-carrying internal frame. Few metal aircraft other than those with milled skins can strictly be regarded as pure monocoques, as they use a metal shell or sheeting reinforced with frames riveted to the skin, but most wooden aircraft are described as monocoques, even though they also incorporate frames.

By contrast, a semi-monocoque is a hybrid combining a tensile stressed skin and a compressive structure made up of longerons and ribs or frames. Other semi-monocoques, not to be confused with true monocoques, include vehicle unibodies, and inflatable shells or balloon tanks, both of which are pressure stabilised.

== Aircraft ==
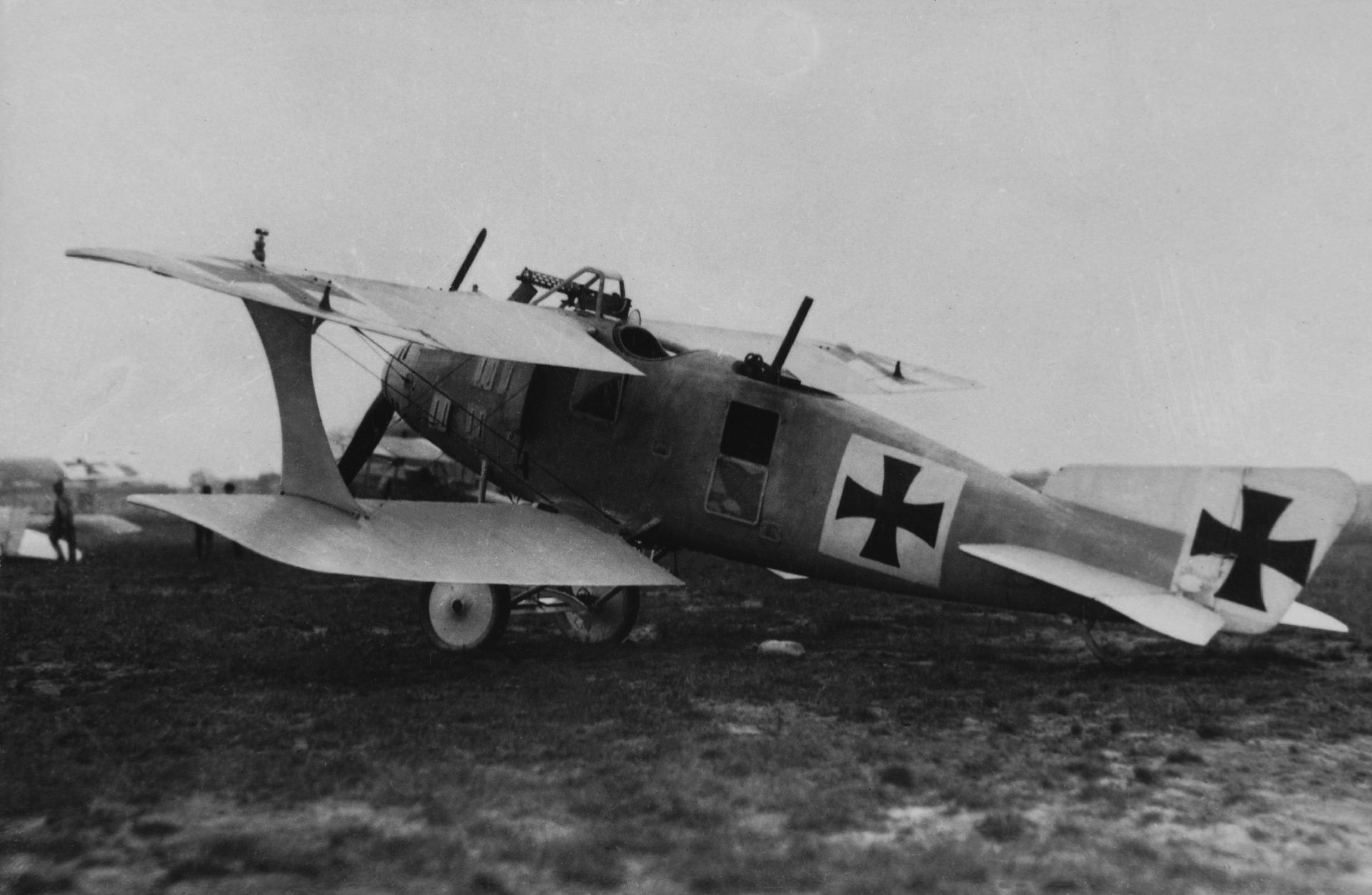
LFG Roland C.II with wooden Wickelrumpf monocoque fuselage

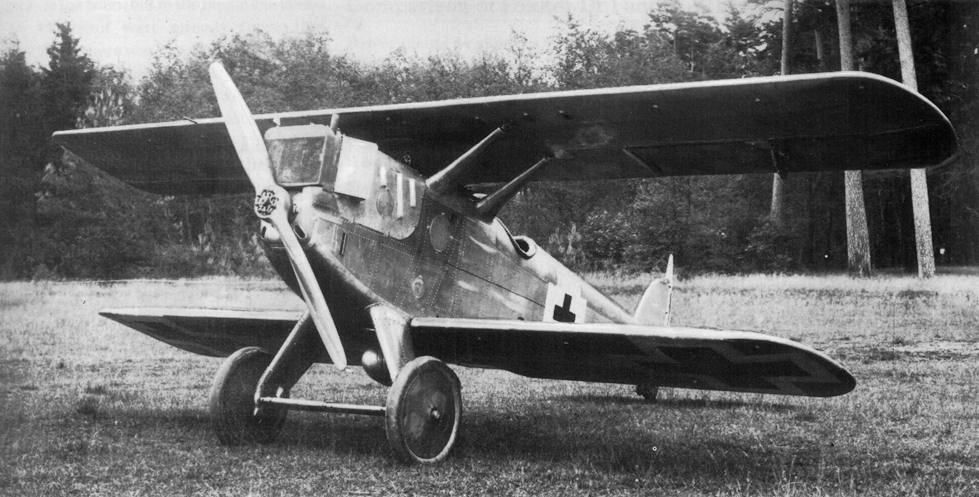
Zeppelin D.I, the first production all-metal monocoque aircraft

Early aircraft were constructed using frames, typically of wood or steel tubing, which could then be covered (or skinned) with fabric such as Irish linen or cotton. The fabric made a minor structural contribution in tension but none in compression and was there for aerodynamic reasons only. By considering the structure as a whole and not just the sum of its parts, monocoque construction integrated the skin and frame into a single load-bearing shell with significant improvements to strength and weight.

To make the shell, thin strips of wood were laminated into a three dimensional shape; a technique adopted from boat hull construction. One of the earliest examples was the Deperdussin Monocoque racer in 1912, which used a laminated fuselage made up of three layers of glued poplar veneer, which provided both the external skin and the main load-bearing structure. This also produced a smoother surface and reduced drag so effectively that it was able to win most of the races it was entered into.

This style of construction was further developed in Germany by LFG Roland using the patented Wickelrumpf (wrapped hull) form later licensed by them to Pfalz Flugzeugwerke who used it on several fighter aircraft. Each half of the fuselage shell was formed over a male mold using two layers of plywood strips with fabric wrapping between them. The early plywood used was prone to damage from moisture and delamination.

While all-metal aircraft such as the Junkers J 1 had appeared as early as 1915, these were not monocoques but added a metal skin to an underlying framework.

The first metal monocoques were built by Claudius Dornier, while working for Zeppelin-Lindau. He had to overcome a number of problems, not least was the quality of aluminium alloys strong enough to use as structural materials, which frequently formed layers instead of presenting a uniform material. After failed attempts with several large flying boats in which a few components were monocoques, he built the Zeppelin-Lindau V1 to test out a monocoque fuselage. Although it crashed, he learned a lot from its construction. The Dornier-Zeppelin D.I was built in 1918 and although too late for operational service during the war was the first all metal monocoque aircraft to enter production.

In parallel to Dornier, Zeppelin also employed Adolf Rohrbach, who built the Zeppelin-Staaken E-4/20, which when it flew in 1920 became the first multi-engined monocoque airliner, before being destroyed under orders of the Inter-Allied Commission. At the end of WWI, the Inter-Allied Technical Commission published details of the last Zeppelin-Lindau flying boat showing its monocoque construction. In the UK, Oswald Short built a number of experimental aircraft with metal monocoque fuselages starting with the 1920 Short Silver Streak in an attempt to convince the air ministry of its superiority over wood. Despite advantages, aluminium alloy monocoques would not become common until the mid 1930s as a result of a number of factors, including design conservatism and production setup costs. Short would eventually prove the merits of the construction method with a series of flying boats, whose metal hulls didn't absorb water as the wooden hulls did, greatly improving performance. In the United States, Northrop was a major pioneer, introducing techniques used by his own company and Douglas with the Northrop Alpha.

== Land vehicles ==
=== Race cars ===
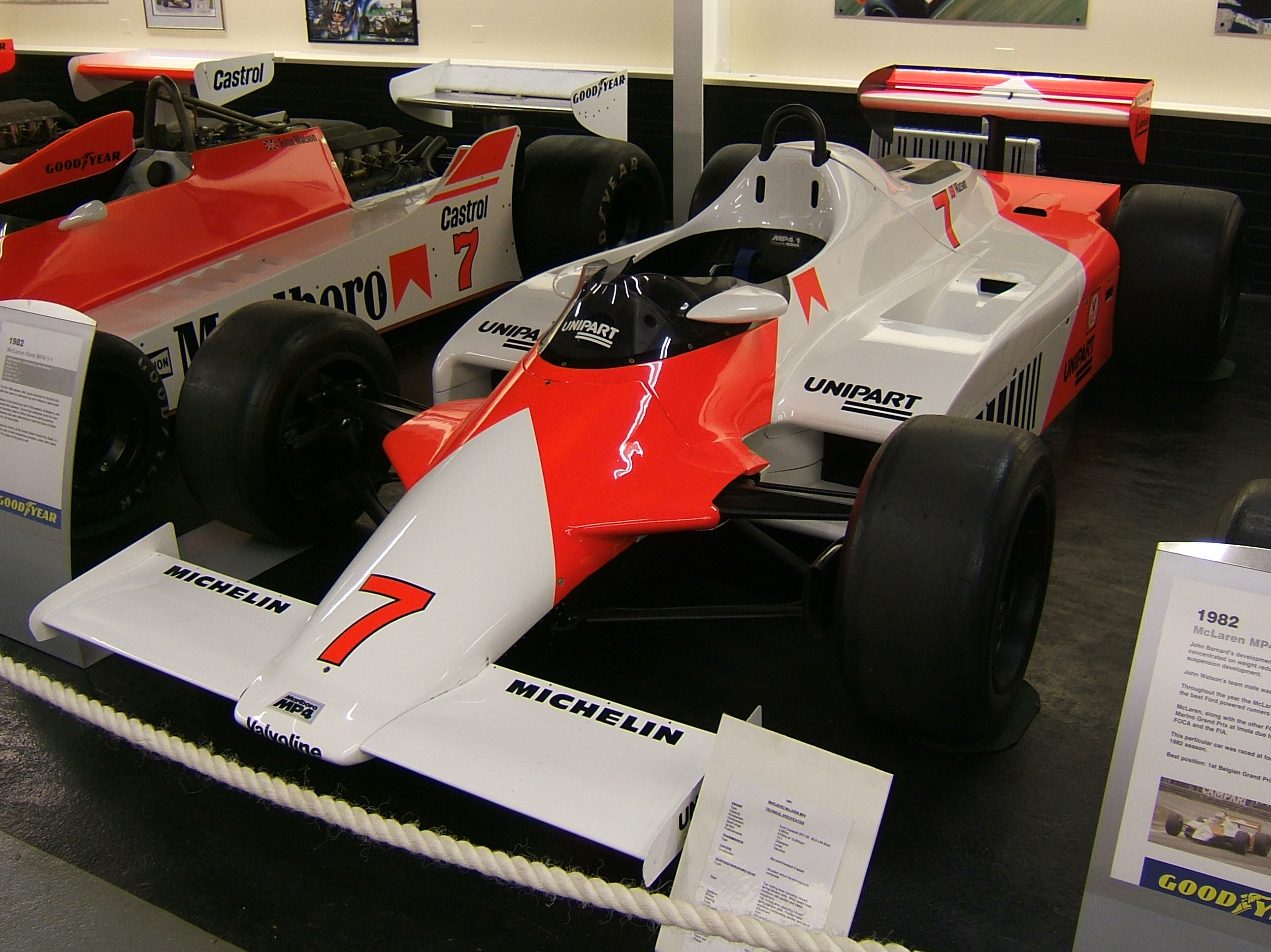
1981 McLaren MP4/1, with a carbon fiber composite monocoque

In motor racing, the safety of the driver depends on the car body, which must meet stringent regulations, and only a few cars have been built with monocoque structures, despite their benefit of lower weight. Lotus introduced the design in Formula racing, where it is now the standard, on its 1962 Lotus 25 Formula One race car, which had an aluminum alloy monocoque body-chassis, and McLaren was the first to use carbon-fiber-reinforced polymers to construct the monocoque of the 1981 McLaren MP4/1.

=== Road cars ===
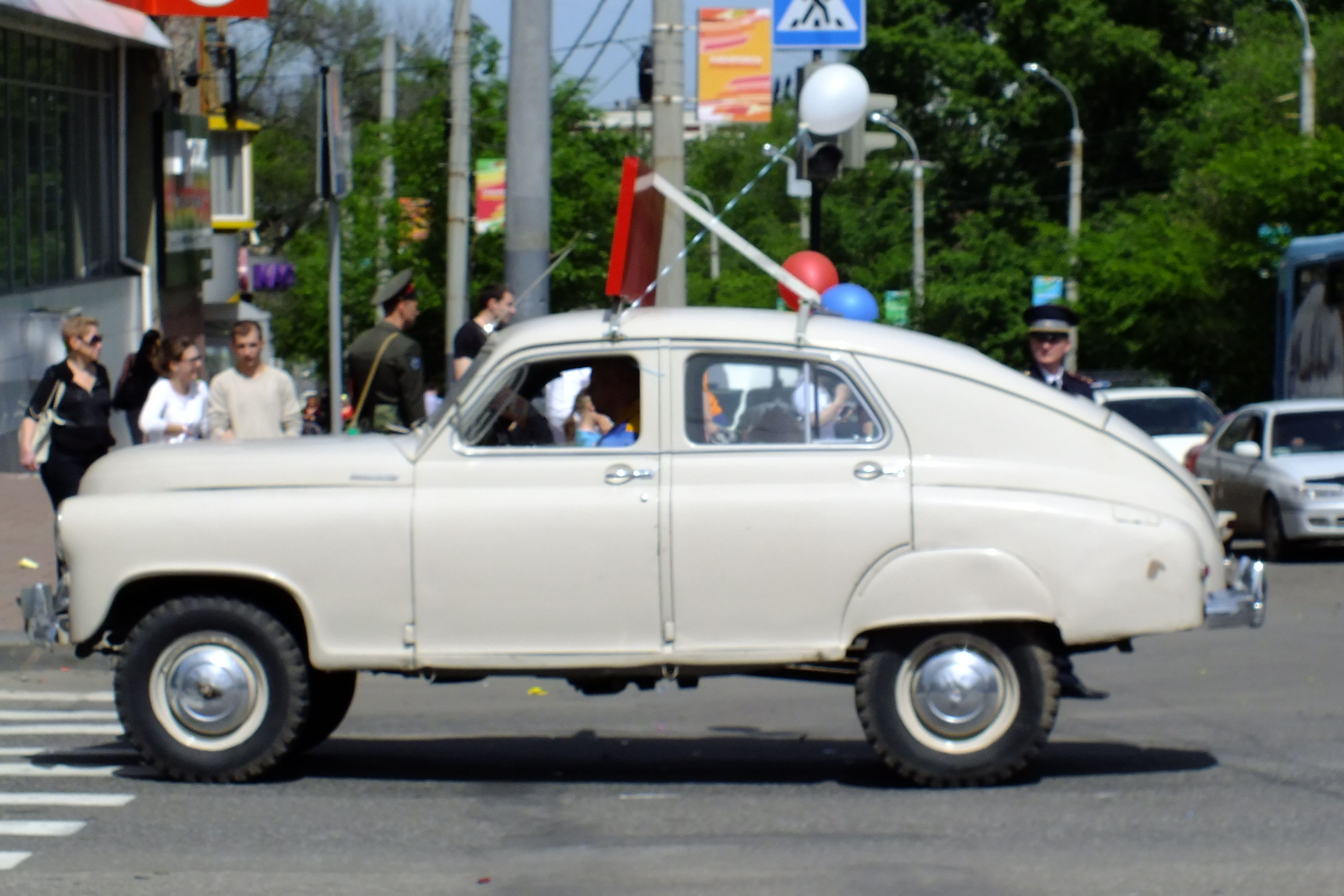
The GAZ M-72 was the world's first series-produced monocoque four-wheel drive (1955).

The term monocoque is frequently misapplied to unibody cars. Commercial car bodies are almost never true monocoques but instead use the unibody system (also referred to as unitary construction, unitary body–chassis or body–frame integral construction), in which the body of the vehicle, its floor pan, and chassis form a single structure, while the skin adds relatively little strength or stiffness. In 1990 the Jaguar XJR-15 became the first production car with a carbon-fiber monocoque.

=== Armoured vehicles ===
Some armoured fighting vehicles use a monocoque structure with a body shell built up from armour plates, rather than attaching them to a frame. This reduces weight for a given amount of armour. Examples include the German TPz Fuchs and RG-33.

=== Two-wheeled vehicles ===
French industrialist and engineer Georges Roy attempted in the 1920s to improve on the bicycle-inspired motorcycle frames of the day, which lacked rigidity. This limited their handling and therefore performance. He applied for a patent in 1926, and at the 1929 Paris Automotive Show unveiled his new motorcycle, the Art-Deco styled 1930 Majestic. Its new type of monocoque body solved the problems he had addressed, and along with better rigidity it did double-duty, as frame and bodywork provided some protection from the elements. Strictly considered, it was more of a semi-monocoque, as it used a box-section, pressed-steel frame with twin side rails riveted together via crossmembers, along with floor pans and rear and front bulkheads.

A Piatti light scooter was produced in the 1950s using a monocoque hollow shell of sheet-steel pressings welded together, into which the engine and transmission were installed from underneath.

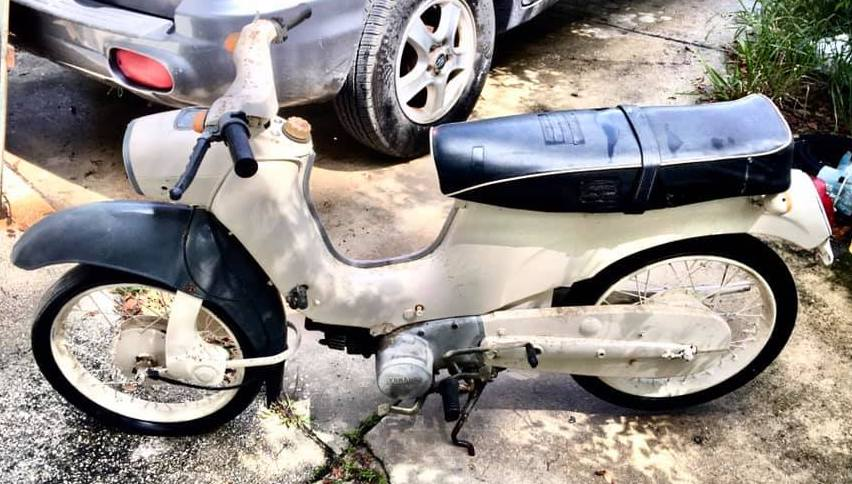
Yamaha MF-1

The machine could be tipped onto its side, resting on the bolt-on footboards for mechanical access.

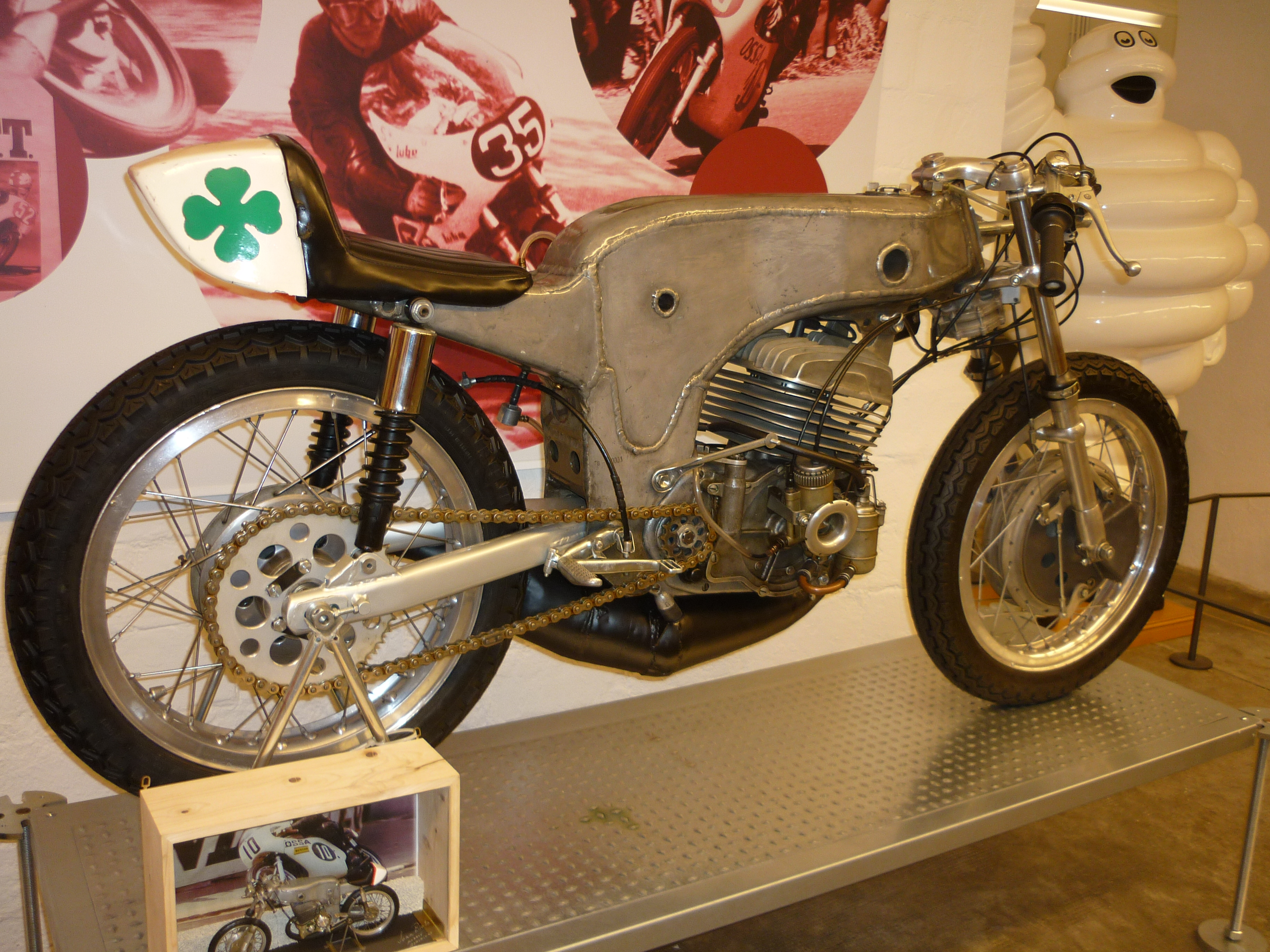
1968 Ossa 250 cc Grand Prix racer

A monocoque framed scooter was produced by Yamaha from 1960–1962. Model MF-1 was powered by a 50 cc engine with a three-speed transmission and a fuel tank incorporated into the frame.

A monocoque-framed motorcycle was developed by Spanish manufacturer Ossa for the 1967 Grand Prix motorcycle racing season. Although the single-cylinder Ossa had 20 horsepower (15 kW) less than its rivals, it was 45 pounds (20 kg) lighter and its monocoque frame was much stiffer than conventional motorcycle frames, giving it superior agility on the racetrack. Ossa won four Grands Prix races with the monocoque bike before their rider died after a crash during the 250 cc event at the 1970 Isle of Man TT, causing the Ossa factory to withdraw from Grand Prix competition.

Notable designers such as Eric Offenstadt and Dan Hanebrink created unique monocoque designs for racing in the early 1970s. The F750 event at the 1973 Isle of Man TT races was won by Peter Williams on the monocoque-framed John Player Special that he helped to design based on Norton Commando. Honda also experimented with the NR500, a monocoque Grand Prix racing motorcycle in 1979. The bike had other innovative features, including an engine with oval shaped cylinders, and eventually succumbed to the problems associated with attempting to develop too many new technologies at once. In 1987 John Britten developed the Aero-D One, featuring a composite monocoque chassis that weighed only 12 kg (26 lb).

An aluminium monocoque frame was used for the first time on a mass-produced motorcycle from 2000 on Kawasaki's ZX-12R, their flagship production sportbike aimed at being the fastest production motorcycle. It was described by Cycle World in 2000 as a "monocoque backbone ... a single large diameter beam" and "Fabricated from a combination of castings and sheet-metal stampings".

Single-piece carbon fiber bicycle frames are sometimes described as monocoques; however as most use components to form a frame structure (even if molded in a single piece), these are frames not monocoques, and the pedal-cycle industry continues to refer to them as framesets.

=== Bike ===
The Lotus Type 108, a monocoque carbon-fiber superbike, gained fame when Chris Boardman won the individual pursuit gold medal at the 1992 Barcelona Olympics. Its design was so innovative that it was subsequently restricted by new regulations.

=== Locomotives ===
The GE P40DC, P42DC and P32ACDM all utilize a monocoque shell.

== Water vessels ==
Most glassfibre boats are of monocoque construction. They may have strengthening bulkheads, but their construction is based on load-bearing shell. Glassfibre composite is extremely suitable for monocoque construction, since it is easy to form, easy to manufacture in molds, and relatively easy to repair if damaged.

Grumman began manufacturing aluminium canoes after the WW2 on monocoque construction. Their construction method was similar as that of the aeroplane drop tanks.

== Rockets ==
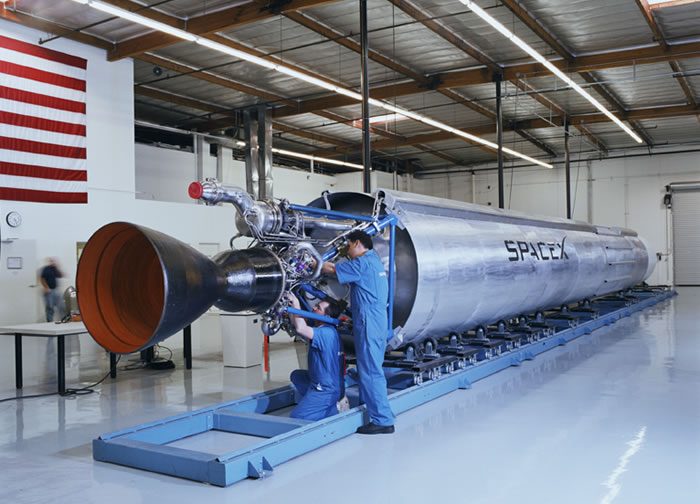
Falcon 1 rocket first-stage

Various rockets have used pressure-stabilized monocoque designs, such as Atlas and Falcon 1. The Atlas was very light since a major portion of its structural support was provided by its single-wall steel balloon fuel tanks, which hold their shape while under acceleration by internal pressure. Balloon tanks are not true monocoques but act in the same way as inflatable shells. A balloon tank skin only handles tensile forces while compression is resisted by internal liquid pressure in a way similar to semi-monocoques braced by a solid frame. This becomes obvious when internal pressure is lost and the structure collapses. Monocoque tanks can also be cheaper to manufacture than more traditional orthogrids. Blue Origin's upcoming New Glenn launch vehicle will use monocoque construction on its second stage despite the mass penalty in order to reduce the cost of production. This is especially important when the stage is expendable, as with the New Glenn second stage.

== See also ==
- Backbone chassis
- Body-on-frame
- Coachbuilder
- List of carbon fiber monocoque cars
- Space frame
- Stressed skin
- Thin-shell structure
- Vehicle frame
