= Maubeuge Construction Automobile =

Maubeuge Construction Automobile SNC
- Company type: Subsidiary
- Industry: Automotive
- Founded: 29 April 1969
- Headquarters: Maubeuge, France
- Key people: Olivier Silva (Director)
- Products: Renault Kangoo III; Mercedes-Benz Citan; Nissan Townstar; Renault 4 E-Tech
- Production output: 137,175 (2013)
- Parent: Renault

Maubeuge plant
- Built: 1969
- Coordinates: 50.271811°N 3.910282°E
- Area: 83 ha (210 acres)
- Address: Maubeuge Construction Automobile, BP 20050, 59604 Maubeuge, France

Maubeuge Construction Automobile (French pronunciation: [mobœʒ kɔ̃stʁyksjɔ̃ otɔmɔbil]; MCA) is a subsidiary of the French car manufacturer Renault created in 1980 to operate the light commercial vehicle plant located at Maubeuge. The company traces its origins back to a Chausson factory established in 1969.

== History ==
In 1969, the Société des Usines Chausson established operations in Maubeuge. In 1970, Renault and Peugeot entered into the company. (a 52% stake was owned by Chausson, a 24% by Renault and a 24% by Peugeot). An assembly facility was inaugurated on 23 September 1971. The next years, however, Chausson struggled with the relatively low sales for the models produced and the breakup of the Renault-Peugeot partnership. In 1978, Renault purchased all the plant's stake and renamed it Maubeuge Chausson Automobile. In 1980, Renault founded MCA. Since the 1990s it specialised on LCVs. In 2011 an all-electric van was put into production. In 2012, as part of the partnership between Renault and Daimler, Maubeuge started to assemble the Mercedes-Benz Citan, a badge-engineered Kangoo. In June 2021, Renault said it plans to merge MCA operations with the Douai and Ruitz ones into a new wholly owned subsidiary named as Renault ElectriCity, with the aim of creating an electric vehicle manufacturing pole in northern France.

== Vehicles manufactured ==
- Renault 15 (1971−1979)
- Renault 18 (1979−1985)
- Renault Fuego (1979−1985)
- Renault 21 Nevada (1986−1990)
- Renault Medallion (1986−1988)
- Renault 19 Cabriolet (1988−1992)
- Renault Express (1989−2000)
- Renault Kangoo (1998−2007)
- Renault Kangoo II (2007−2021)
- Renault Kangoo III (2021−present)
- Mercedes-Benz Citan I (2012−2021)
- Mercedes-Benz Citan II (2021−2026)
- Nissan Townstar (2021−present)
- Renault 4 E-Tech (2024−present)
