= Delfino Feroce =

Overview
- Manufacturer: Delfino UK
- Production: 2000 (attempted)
- Designer: Andrew Borrowman, Sean Prendergast, Allard Marx

Body and chassis
- Class: Roadster
- Body style: 2-door convertible
- Layout: FA (Front engine / AWD)

Powertrain
- Engine: 2.0 L Turbo H4; 2.5 L Turbo H4; 150-400 hp
- Transmission: 5-speed manual 6-speed manual

Dimensions
- Curb weight: 850-925 kg (1870-2035 lbs) (dry weight)

The Delfino Feroce is an unproduced British sports car manufactured by Delfino. The prototype was built using the Subaru Impreza power unit and mechanical parts with a Delfino monocoque chassis designed by Andy Borrowman and Sean Prendergast. The prototype along with the moulds was purchased by Allard Marx who then founded Delfino cars. It was powered by a turbocharged flat-4 Subaru engine. It is capable of a 0-60 mph time of under four seconds.

The next phase for the company is an as yet unannounced cleaner energy source to go into full production.

== Composition ==
The basis of the Delfino Feroce consists of a GRP monocoque tub with a front Space Frame that contains the engine. The front suspension attaches to the spaceframe while the rear suspension attaches directly to the monocoque tub.

The monocoque tub was based upon the earlier Minari Kit Car designed by Andrew Borrowman and Sean Prendergast in the early 1990s, the delfino was originally a prototype Minari kit car that had been modified to take a Subaru drive train as opposed to the original Alfa Romeo drive train. The Subaru drive train was selected due to its flat 4 engine design being a similar size to the Alfa Romeo flat 4 boxer engine meaning it would fit under the bonnet without a large bulge.

== History ==
The prototype car briefly made the news when it went missing in 2001. It was reported stolen, but was later found in police custody, having been towed away.

== Foreign investment and sales ==
The Delfino Feroce was intended to be launched in an far Eastern country by Allard Marx. The car and company were launched amid much fanfare, national press and with that country's Prime Minister test-driving the car on national prime-time television.

Unfortunately because the car had not been developed by nationals but 'imported' as a ready but relatively little known package, the company actually had no production permits from the same government that had endorsed the car. On top of this there was no finance in place to allow them to continue the project in the country.

INCIDE, the company that owned the Delfino brand, was left with the cleanup project after a lot of wasted time and a considerable amount of embarrassment.

== Video games ==
The car was featured in the games Project Gotham Racing and Project Gotham Racing 2.
