= Brussels Motor Show =

Biennial auto-show held in Belgium

Coordinates: 50.8994°N 4.3375°E

The European Motor Show Brussels is an auto show held biennially in Brussels, Belgium. The number of visitors is around 270,000. The show is organized by the Belgian and Luxembourgish Automobile Federation (FEBIAC), and is scheduled by the Organisation Internationale des Constructeurs d'Automobiles. It is considered one of the premier auto shows in Europe.

== History ==
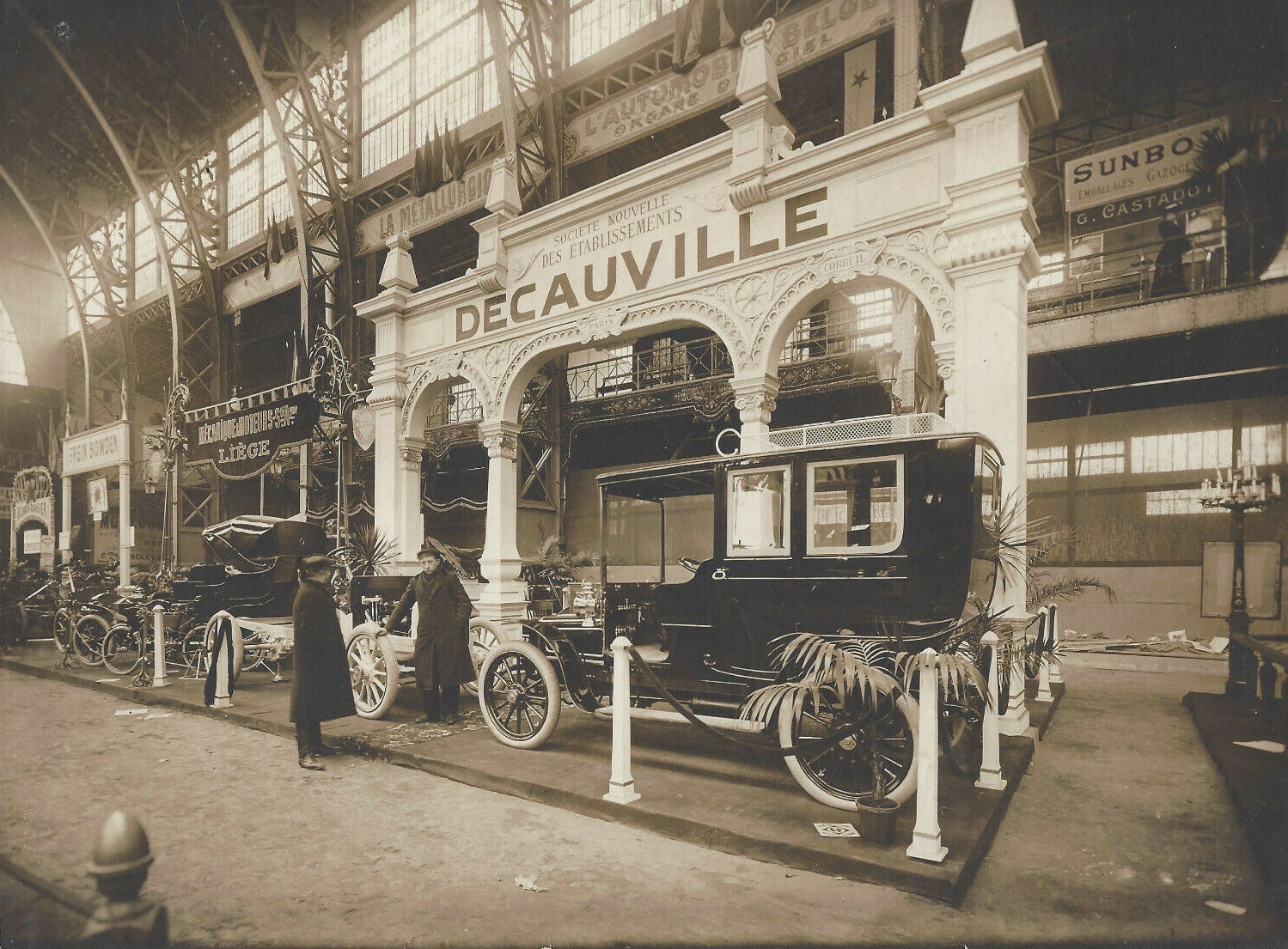
Stand of French manufacturer Decauville at the 1905 show

The show was first organized in 1902 in the Parc du Cinquantenaire/Jubelpark in Brussels. The yearly Motor Show was interrupted between 1915 and 1919 because of World War I. By 1937, the exhibit area in the Cinquantenaire Park became too small and the Motor Show moved to the Centenary Palace on the Heysel/Heizel Plateau, in the north-west of Brussels, only to be cancelled from 1940 to 1948 due to the Second World War. A third period of interruption occurred between 1957 and 1959 because of the 1958 Brussels World's Fair (Expo 58), which occupied the whole Heysel Plateau.

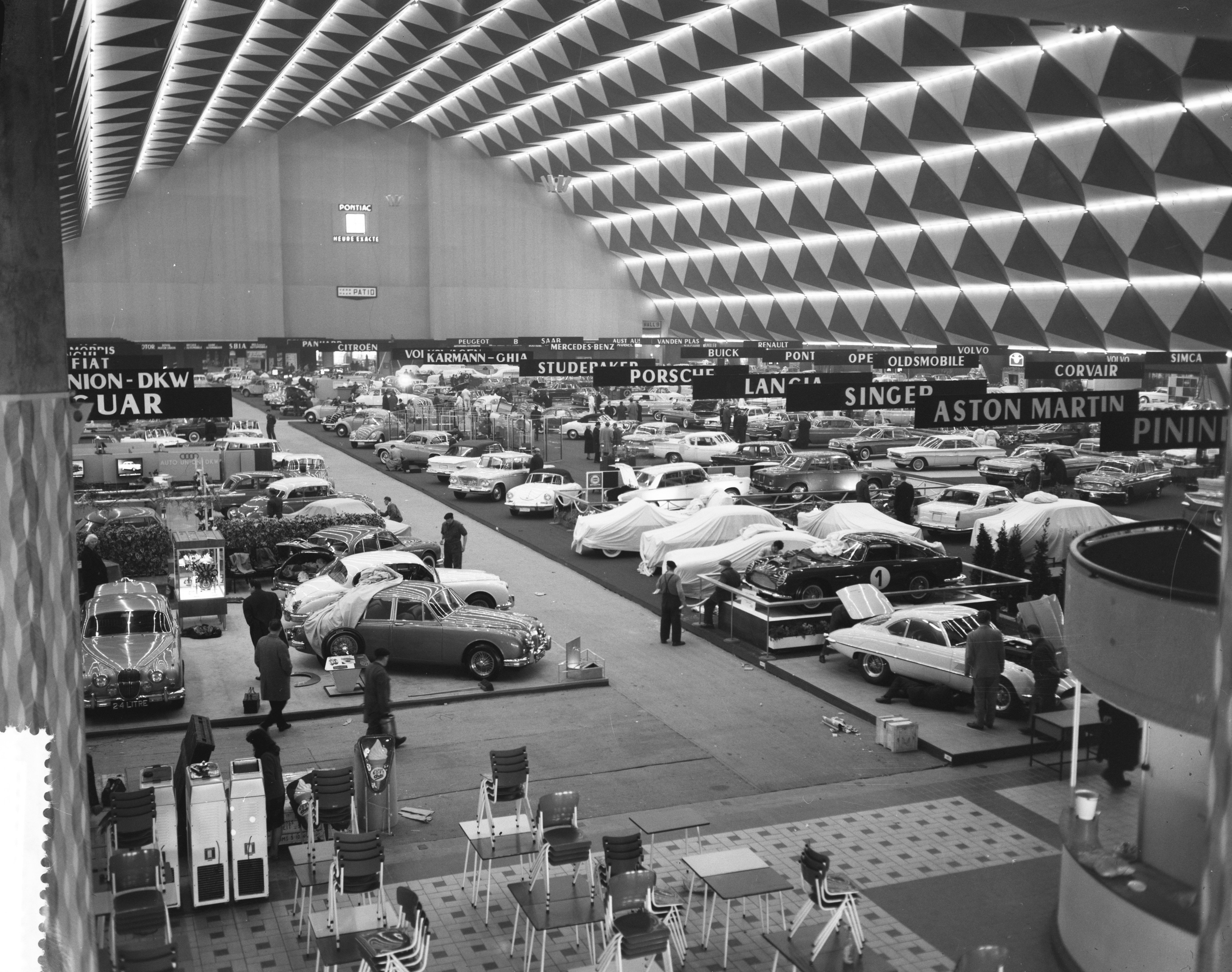
41st edition of the show in 1961

In 1973, a separate show for commercial vehicles was set up. In 1978 Hendrik Daems, the then-Chairman, decided to henceforth reserve even years for passenger cars and motorcycles, and odd years for commercial vehicles. This alternating focus on commercial and passenger vehicles was maintained until the 2010s, when heavy truck and bus manufacturers left the Motor Show one after another, and the focus of what was considered the lesser event changed to leisure-oriented vehicles: off-roaders, pick-ups, sports cars, cabriolets and so on.

== Editions ==
=== 2026 ===
It takes place between January 9 and 18 as the 102st edition of the motor show.

==== World premieres ====
- Citroën ELO
- Hyundai Staria EV
- Kia EV2
- Kia EV3 GT
- Kia EV4 GT
- Kia EV5 GT
- Mazda CX-6e (European version)
- Opel Astra (facelift)
- Peugeot 408 (facelift)

=== 2025 ===
It takes place between January 10 and 19 as the 101st edition of the motor show.

==== World premieres ====
- Alfa Romeo Junior Q4
- BYD Atto 2
- DS N°8
- Mazda 6e (European version)
- Microlino Spider
- Škoda Enyaq facelift
- Toyota Urban Cruiser

=== 2023 ===
It took place between January 14 and 22 as the 100th edition of the motor show.

==== World premieres ====
- Mazda MX-30 R-EV

=== 2022 ===
The 2022 edition of the show, originally scheduled for January 14 to January 23, was canceled at the end of November 2021 due to the resurgence of the COVID-19 pandemic in Europe.

=== 2021 ===
Originally scheduled to take place between January 15 and 24, it was canceled due to the COVID-19 pandemic.

=== 2020 ===
It took place between January 10 and January 19.

==== Production cars ====
- Citroën C5 Aircross Hybrid
- Dacia Duster Eco-G
- Jeep Renegade 4xe
- Jeep Compass 4xe
- Kia XCeed Plug-in Hybrid
- Mercedes-Benz GLA (Type 247)
- MG ZS EV
- Renault Captur E-Tech Plug-in
- Renault Clio E-Tech

==== Restyles ====
- Jaguar F-Type phase 3

=== 2019 ===
It took place between January 19 and January 27.

==== Production cars ====
- Ford Mondeo Clipper Hybrid
- Jaguar F-Type Chequered Flag
- McLaren 720S Spider
- Opel Zafira Life
- Range Rover Evoque
- Škoda Scala
- Volkswagen Golf GTI TCR
- BMW 8 Series

==== Restyles ====
- Hyundai i40 & i40 Wagon

==== Concept cars ====
- Opel GT X Experimental

=== 2012 ===
The show was held from January 10 to January 22, it was the 90th edition of the motor show.

==== World premieres ====
- Renault Scénic
- Renault Grand Scénic
- Peugeot 107
- Toyota Land Cruiser V8
- Toyota Aygo

==== European premieres ====
- Porsche 911 Carrera 2S Cabriolet
- BMW 3 Sedan
- Mini Roadster
- Nissan Juke S/V

==== Concept cars ====
- Mercedes-Benz SLS AMG E-Cell
- Mercedes-Benz A Concept
- Volkswagen Golf Blue-e-motion
- Renault Frendzy
- Renault R-Space
- Renault Zoe preview
- Ford B-Max Concept
- Ford Evos Concept
- Toyota FT86 II Concept
- Toyota Prius+
- Toyota Prius Plug-in
- Toyota Yaris HSD Concept
- Nissan Nismo Leaf
- Audi A1 e-tron
- Audi R8 e-tron
- Volvo V60 PHEV
- Volvo C30 Electric
- Opel RAK e
- Peugeot EX1
- Peugeot HX1
- BMW i3 Concept
- BMW i8 Concept
- Škoda MissionL
- Land Rover Defender DC100
- Subaru BRZ Concept STI
