= Hyundai Staria =

Light commercial vehicle and passenger minivan by Hyundai

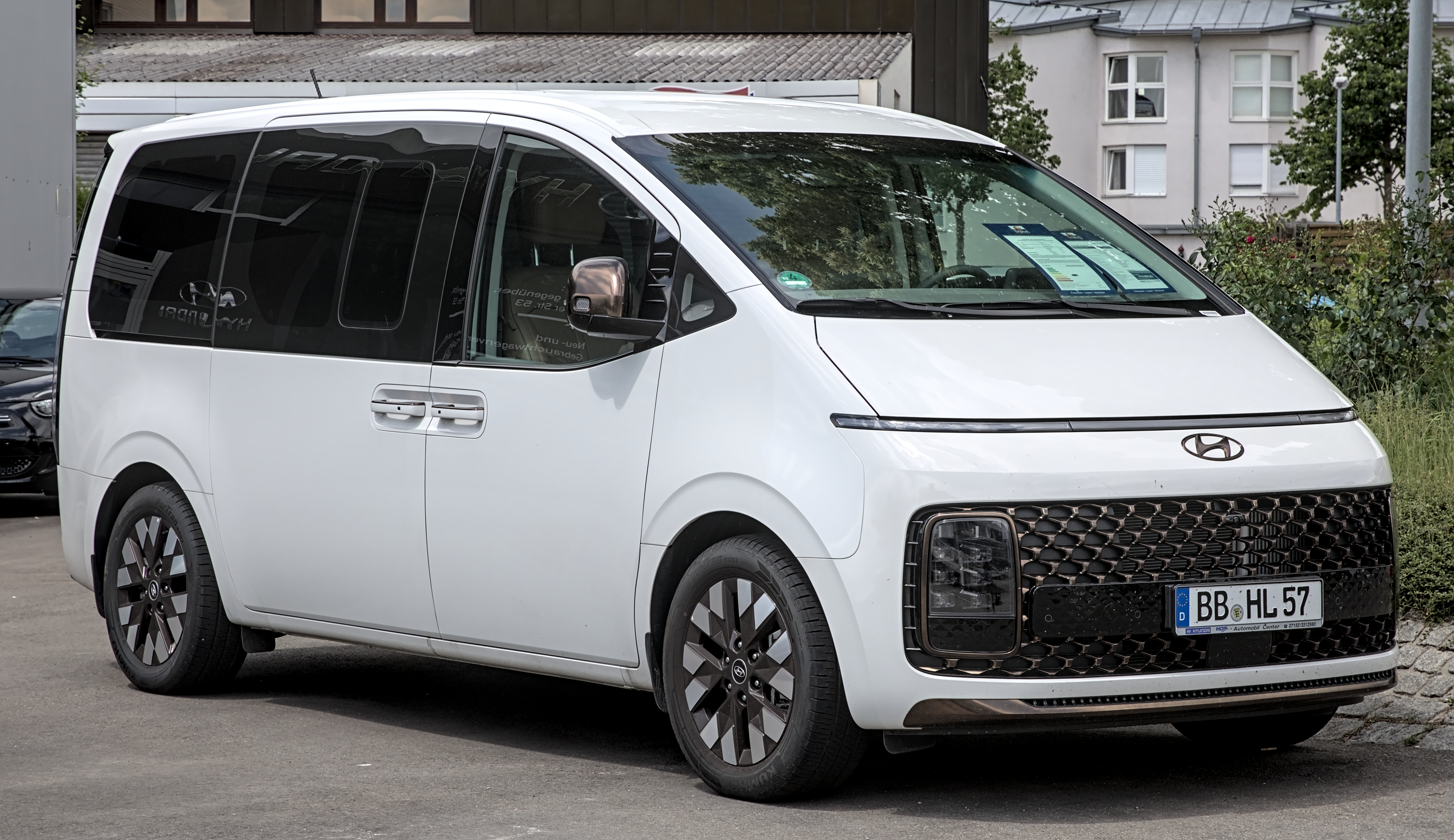

Overview
- Manufacturer: Hyundai
- Model code: US4
- Production: 2021–present
- Assembly: South Korea: Ulsan (Ulsan Plant 4); Jeonju (July 2022–present); Malaysia: Kulim, Kedah (Inokom)
- Designer: Joon Seo

Body and chassis
- Class: Minivan; Light commercial vehicle (M)
- Body style: 5-door minivan; 5-door panel van
- Layout: Front-engine, front-wheel-drive; Front-engine, all-wheel-drive
- Platform: Hyundai-Kia N3
- Related: Kia Carnival (KA4); Hyundai ST1

Powertrain
- Engine: Petrol: 3.5 L Smartstream G3.5 V6; Petrol/hybrid: 1.6 L Smartstream G1.6 GDi turbo I4; Petrol/LPG: 3.5 L Smartstream L3.5 V6; Diesel: 2.2 L R II CRDi I4
- Transmission: 6-speed manual; 6-speed automatic; 8-speed automatic

Dimensions
- Wheelbase: 3,275 mm (128.9 in)
- Length: 5,255 mm (206.9 in)
- Width: 1,995 mm (78.5 in)
- Height: 1,990–2,030 mm (78.3–79.9 in); 2,200 mm (86.6 in) (Lounge Limousine); 2,120–2,285 mm (83.5–90.0 in) (Ambulance)
- Kerb weight: 1,990–2,390 kg (4,387–5,269 lb)

Chronology
- Predecessor: Hyundai Starex

The Hyundai Staria (Korean: 현대 스타리아) is a van and minivan manufactured by Hyundai since 2021.

It was the successor to the Starex, replacing the rear-wheel-drive layout of the Starex with a front-wheel-drive-based platform shared with other large Hyundai and Kia vehicles. The name "Staria" was coined by combining the word "star" with "ria". It is currently marketed in South Korea, South Africa, Southeast Asia, Australia, Middle East, Latin America, and several European countries.

It shares its components with the fourth-generation Kia Carnival, utilizing the N3 platform, which is Hyundai-Kia's mid-size platform from the Hyundai Motor Group.

== Overview ==
Interior and exterior images of the Staria were released on 18 March 2021. Following the automaker's new design theme "Inside Out," the vehicle is said to feature the look of a spaceship and a wide-open cabin.

The model achieved a maximum height of the cabin up to 1,379 mm (54.3 in) by raising the total height by 70 mm (2.8 in) and lowering the ground clearance by 30 mm (1.2 in) compared to its predecessor, the Starex. Hyundai designers also introduced a low beltline to create larger side windows, which are called "wide panoramic windows". The Staria has been noted to be spacious, but difficult to park, especially in multi-story car parks.

The Staria comes in two versions, a standard model and a high-end variant which is known as the Staria Lounge or Staria Premium in several markets. A cargo version is also offered in several regions.

=== Staria ===
The standard model offers various trim levels including Tourer and Cargo. The front features a horizontal daytime running lights and headlamps and a radiator grille that has the same colour with the car body, depending on the preference of the buyer: it can also be coloured solid black. The vehicle has a large panoramic window and low beltline for a higher visibility. Inside, a 10.25-inch (260 mm) front display screen and the HVAC system controller are housed while a colour LCD cluster is positioned at the top of the dashboard.

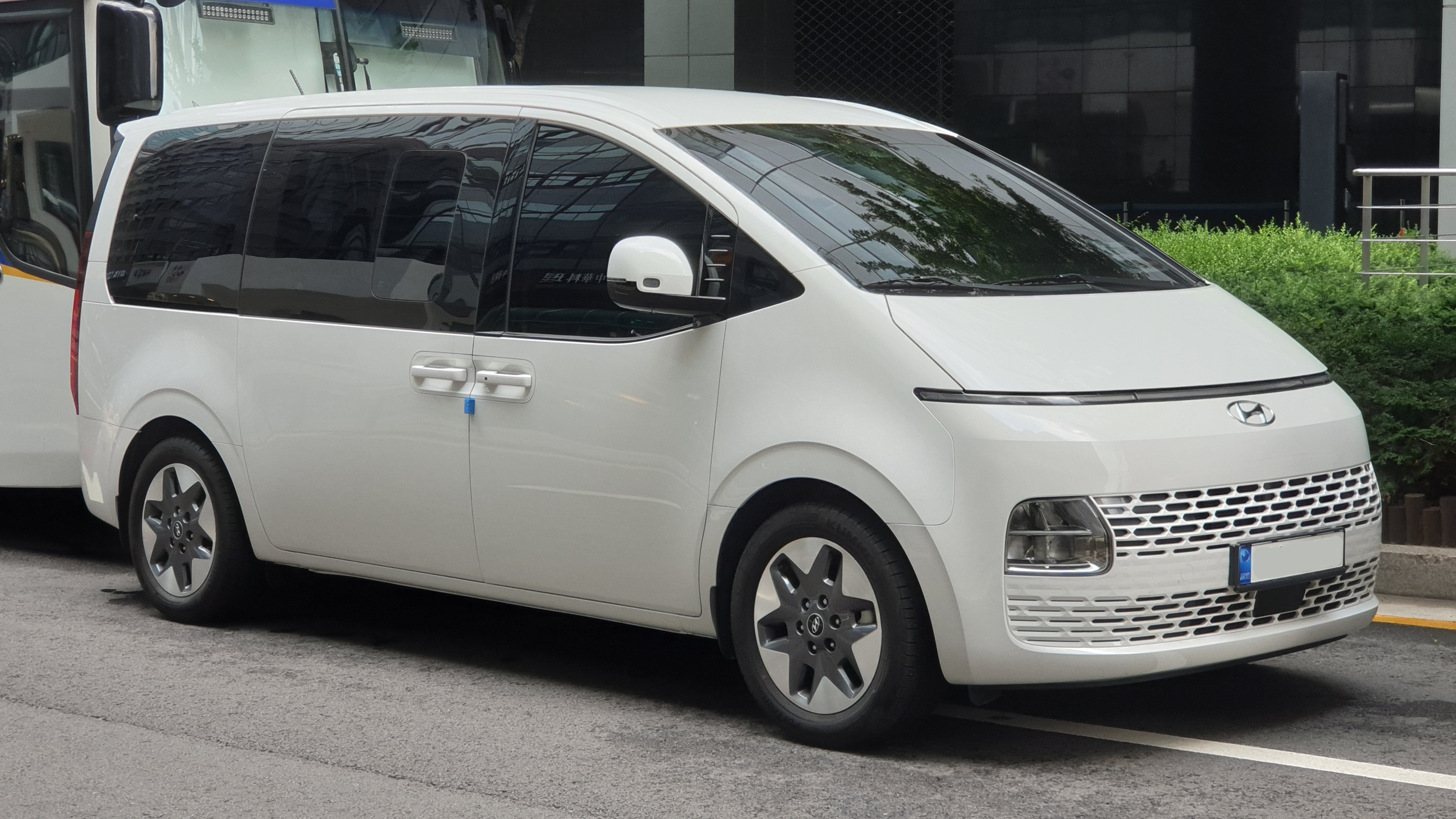
Staria

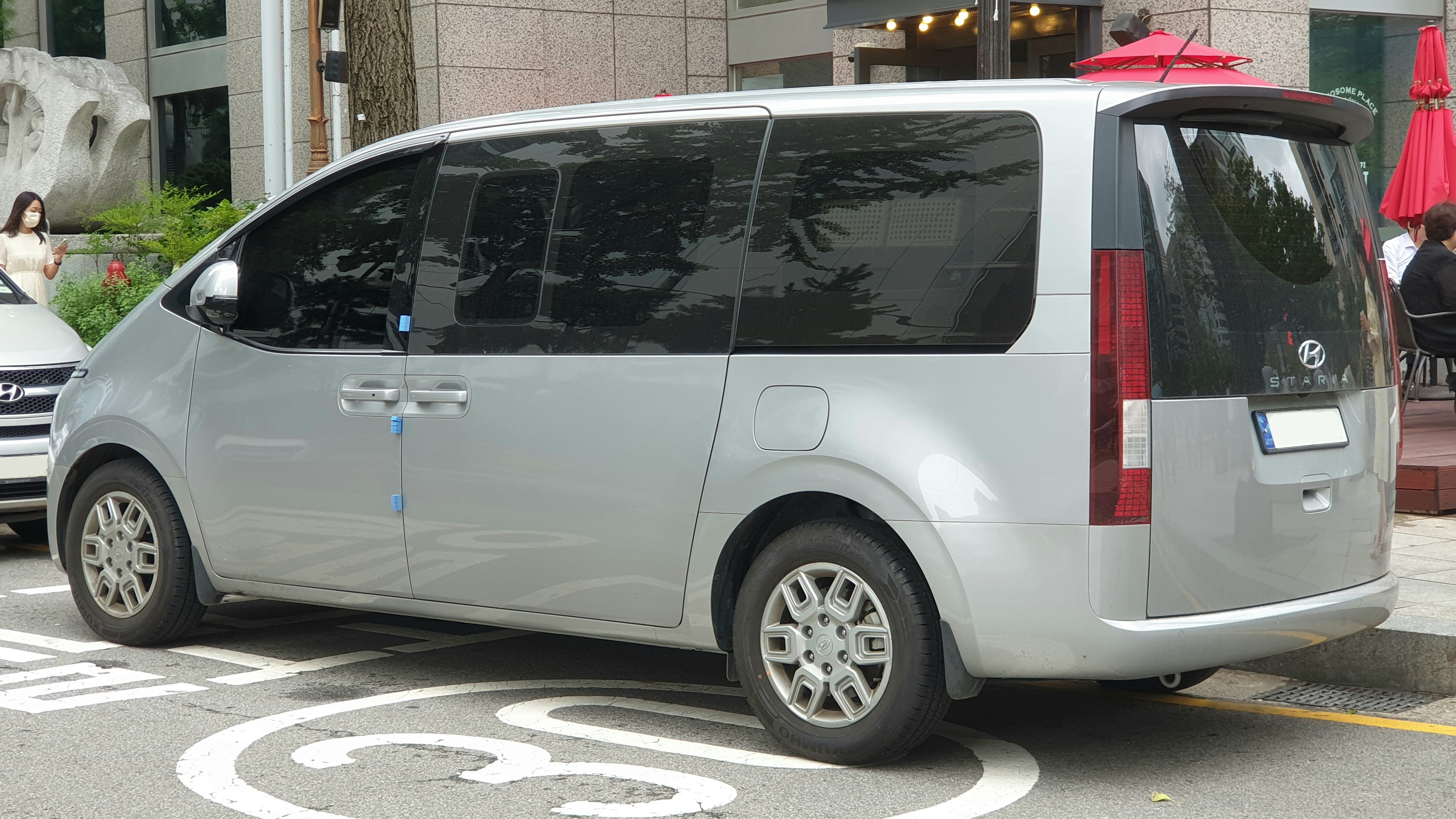
Staria rear view

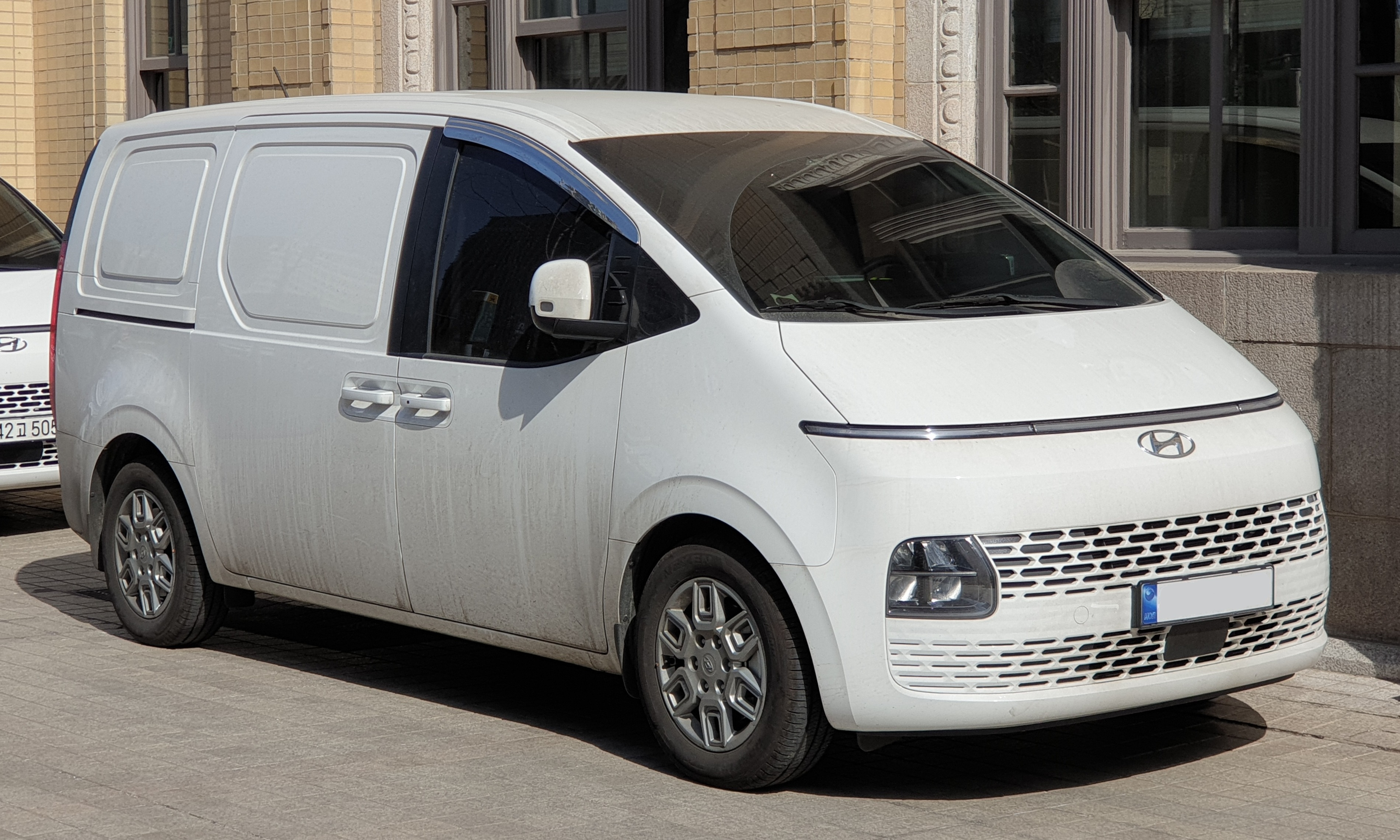
Staria Cargo panel van

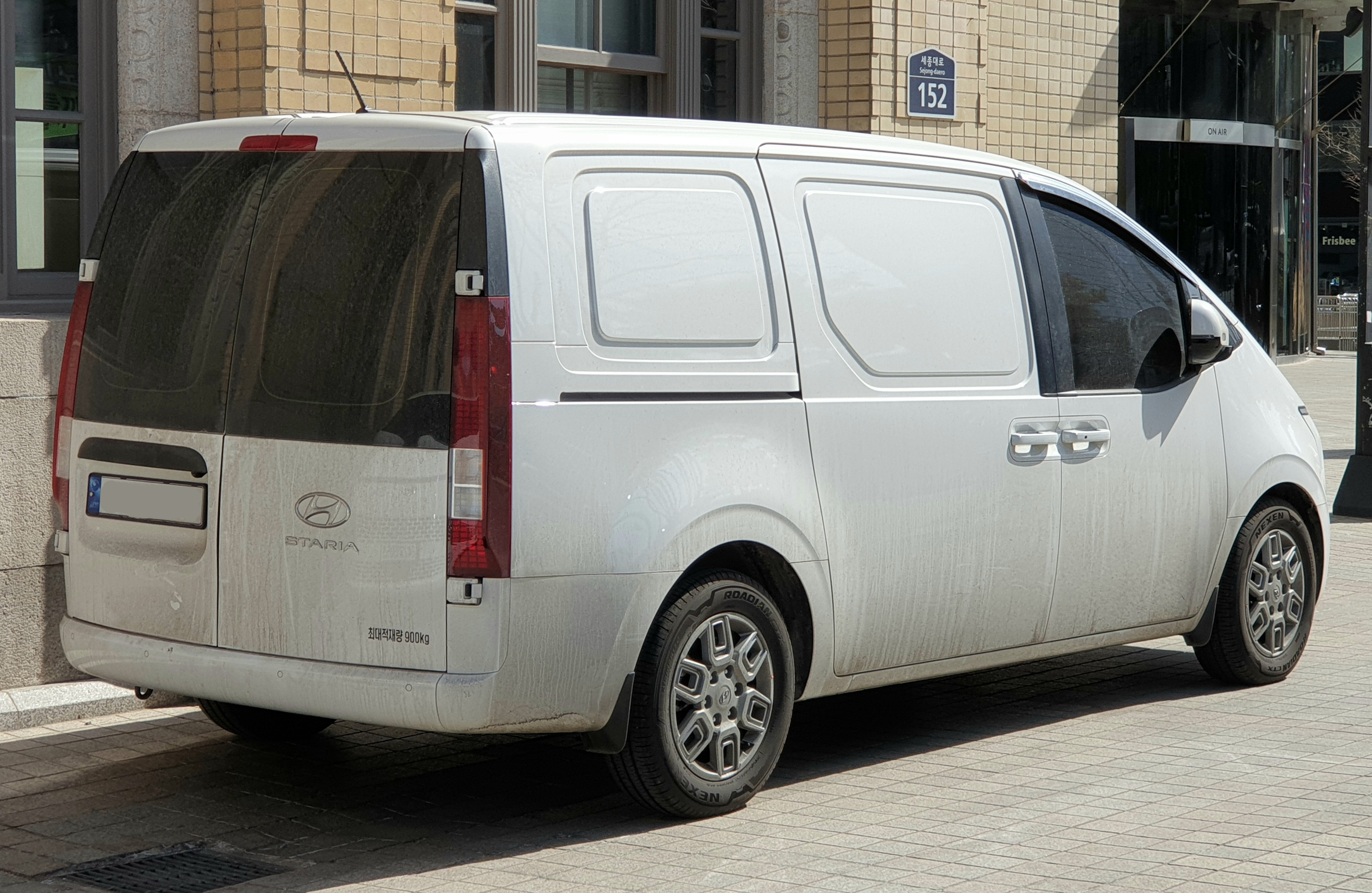
Staria Cargo panel van rear view

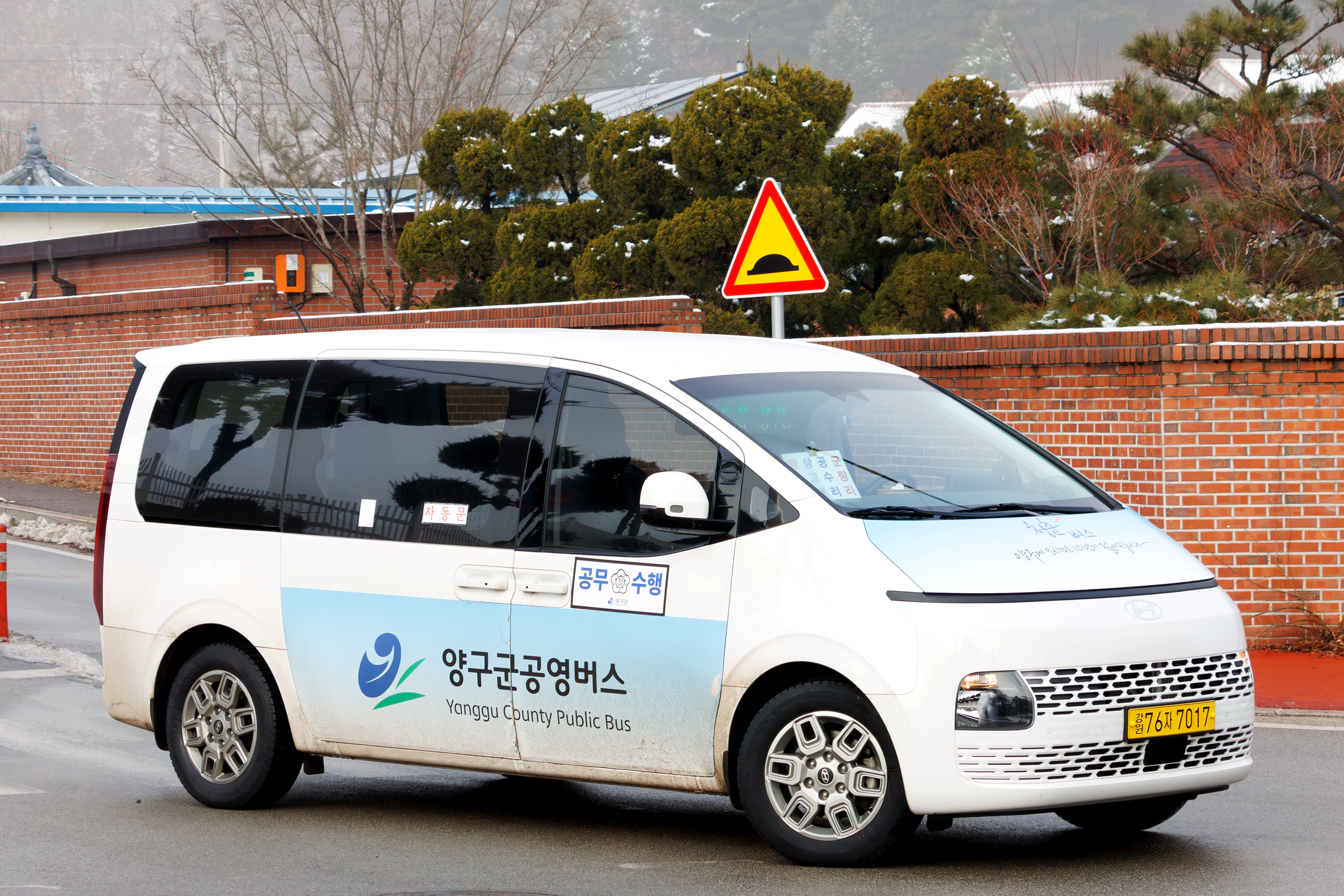
Staria Tourer, city bus in Yanggu County

=== Staria Lounge/Premium ===
The Staria Lounge or Staria Premium is an upscale version of the Staria, which is available in 7-seater and 9-seater models. The front end features a redesigned mesh-patterned radiator grille, full light-emitting diode (LED) headlamps and turn signals. Other design features include 18-inch alloy wheels, front and rear bumper garnishes and side mirrors. The rear part is equipped with an LED rear combination lamp. The interior features a 64-colour ambient mood light. The 7-seater has "premium relaxation seats" while the 9-seater has "swiveling seats". It was released on 9 August 2021. It is the sole version of the Staria in some markets, including Indonesia, Philippines, Malaysia, and several European markets.

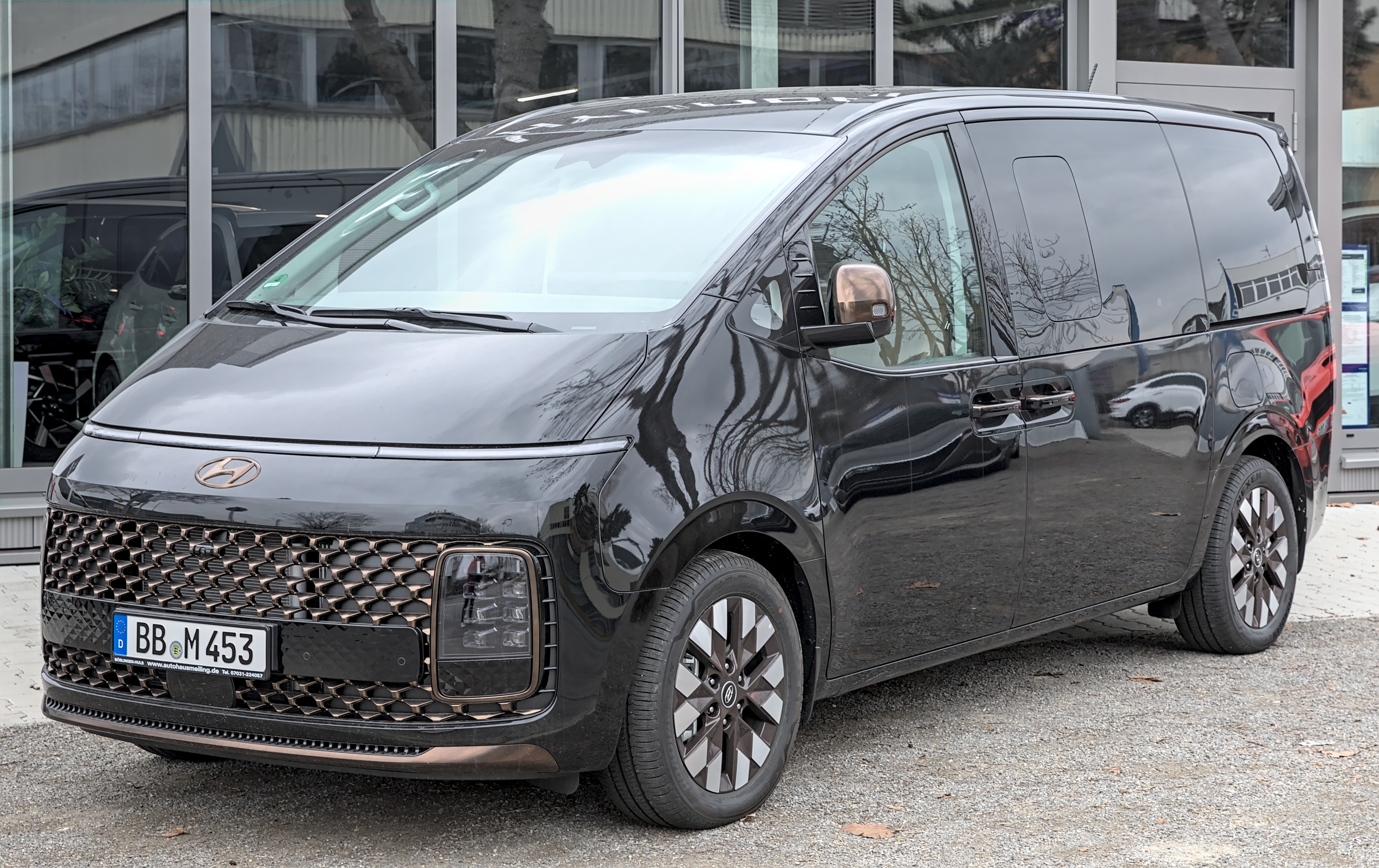
Staria Lounge

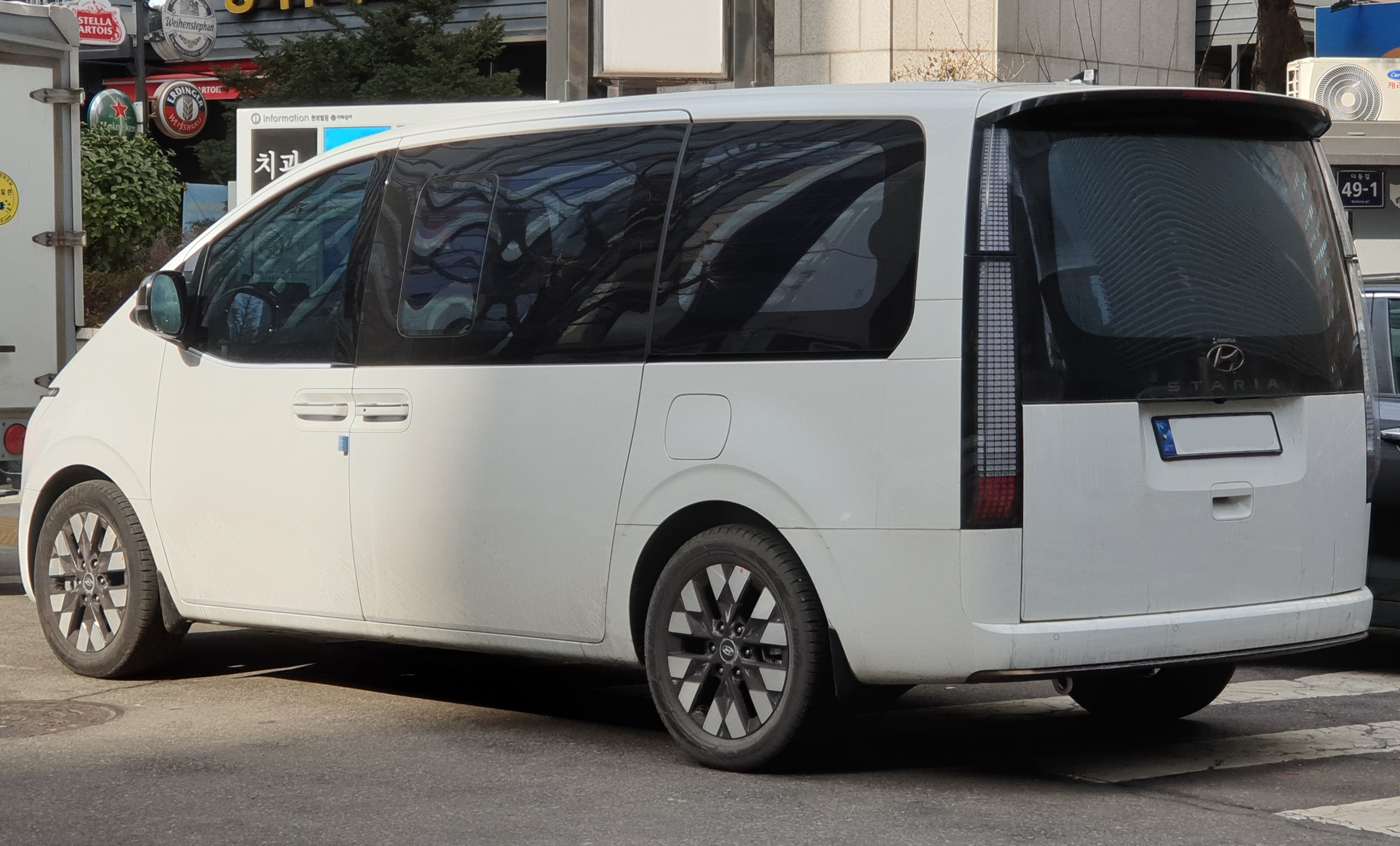
Rear

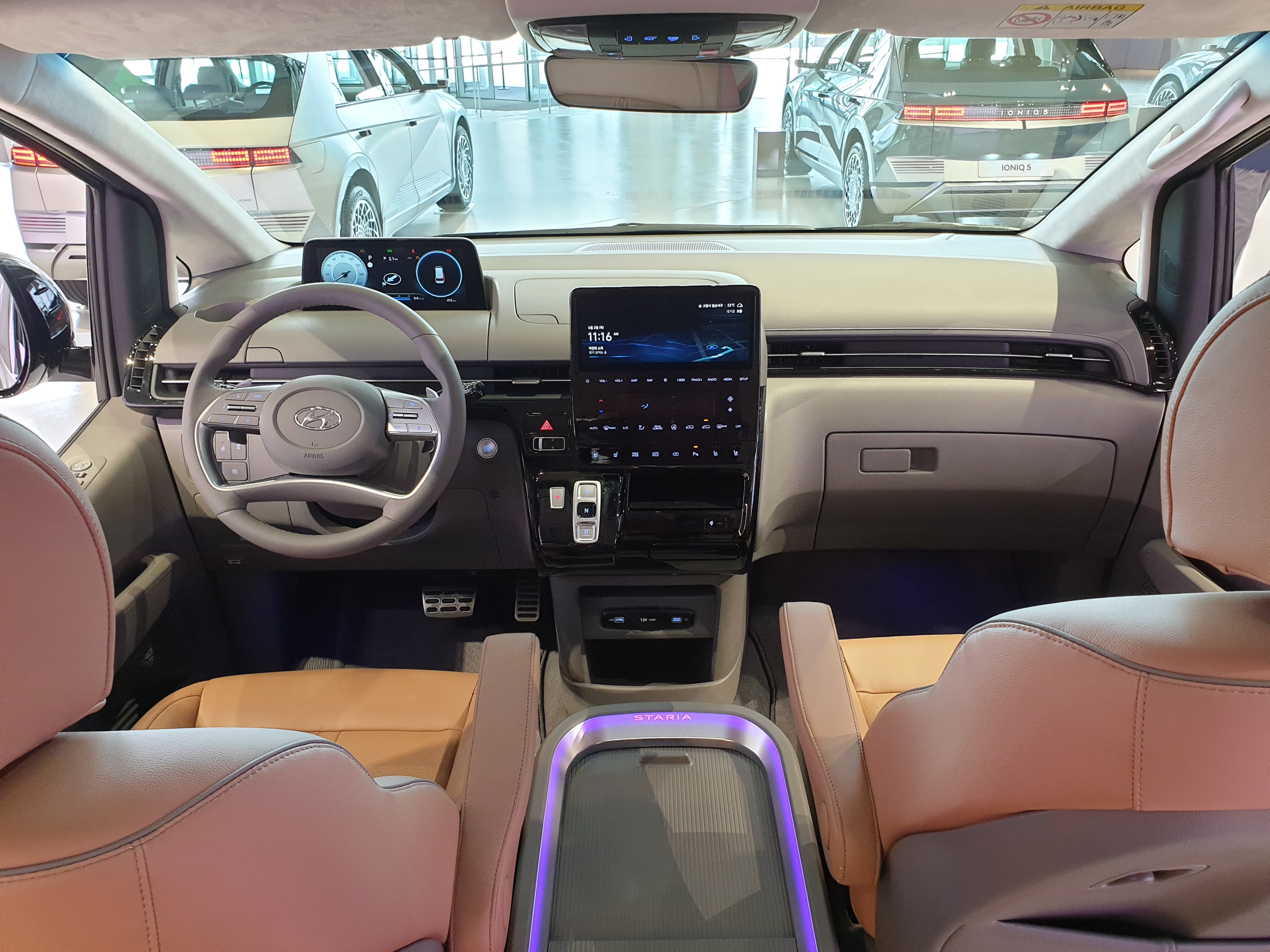
Interior

=== Staria Lounge Limousine ===
It was released on 19 April 2022. The Staria Lounge Limousine is the top trim of the Staria Lounge. The second-row passenger seat electric side step is automatically deployed according to the sliding door opening and closing. It is located on the underside of the vehicle when driving. The indoor electric height has been extended by 205 mm (8.1 in) from the basic trim. A movable console that can move from row 1 to row 2 has been applied. In addition, a 25-inch rear seat display, built-in air purifier, and starry sky mood lighting were added. And electric steering devices and limousine specialized suspension were applied.

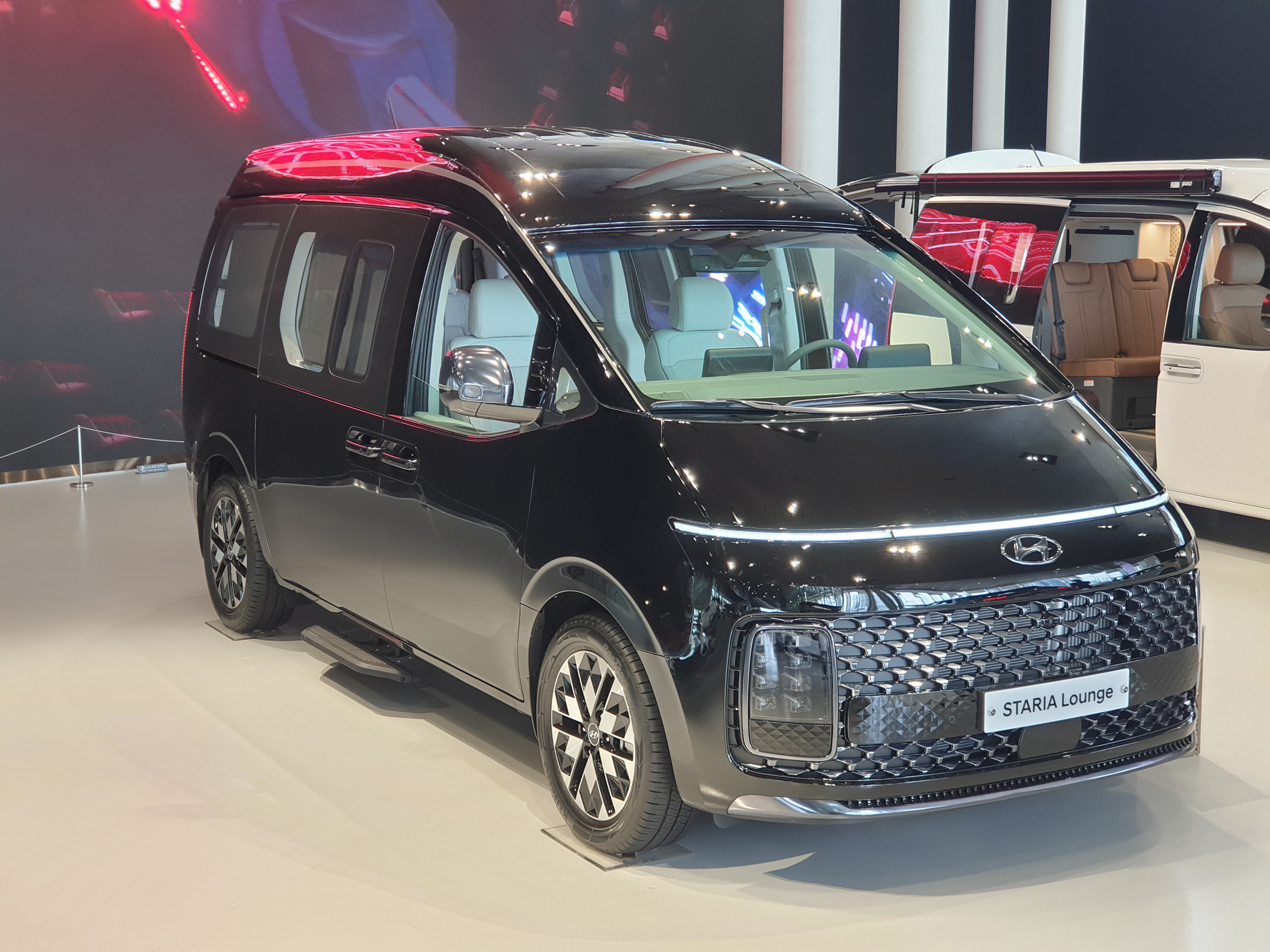
Front view

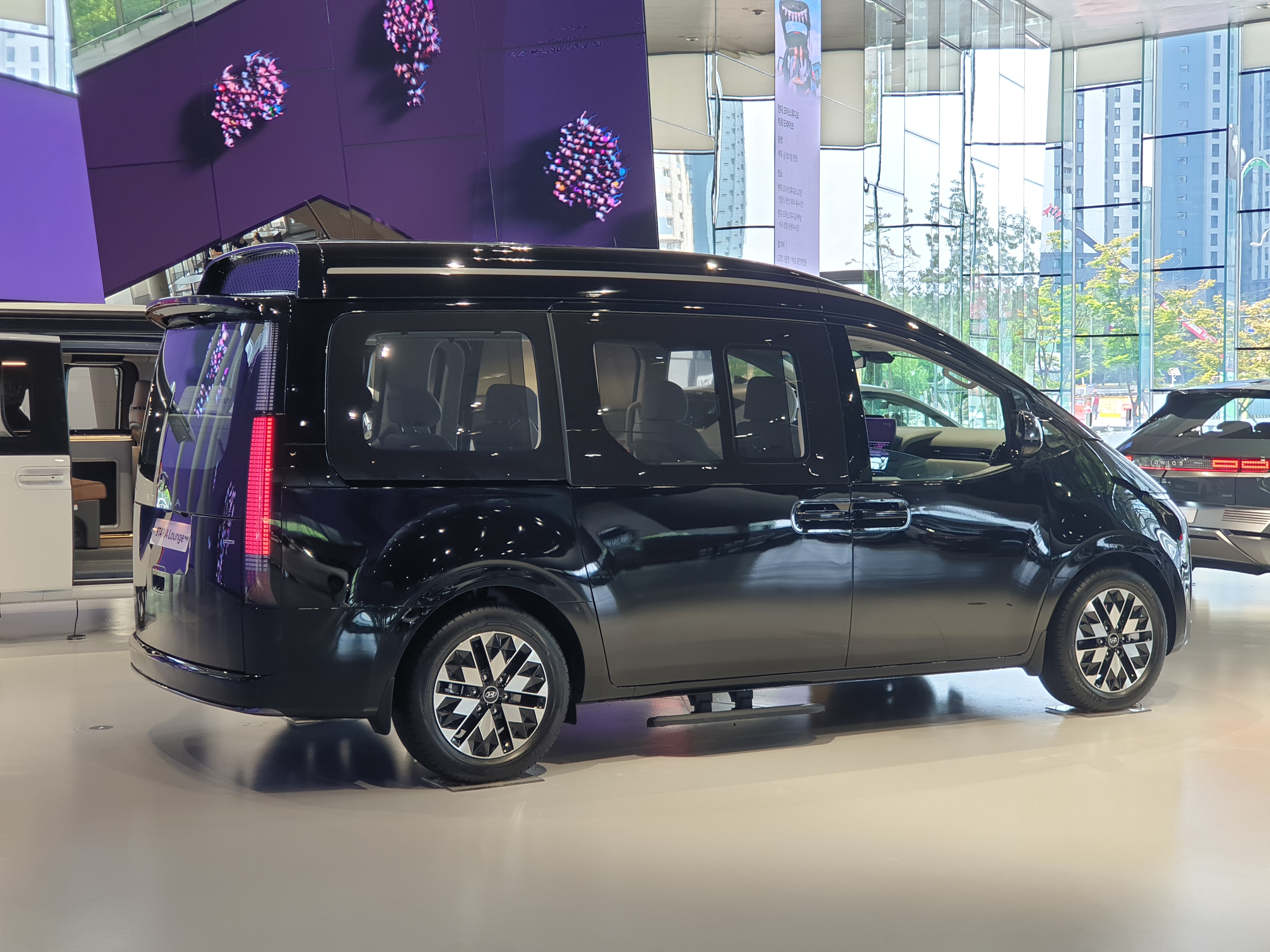
Rear view

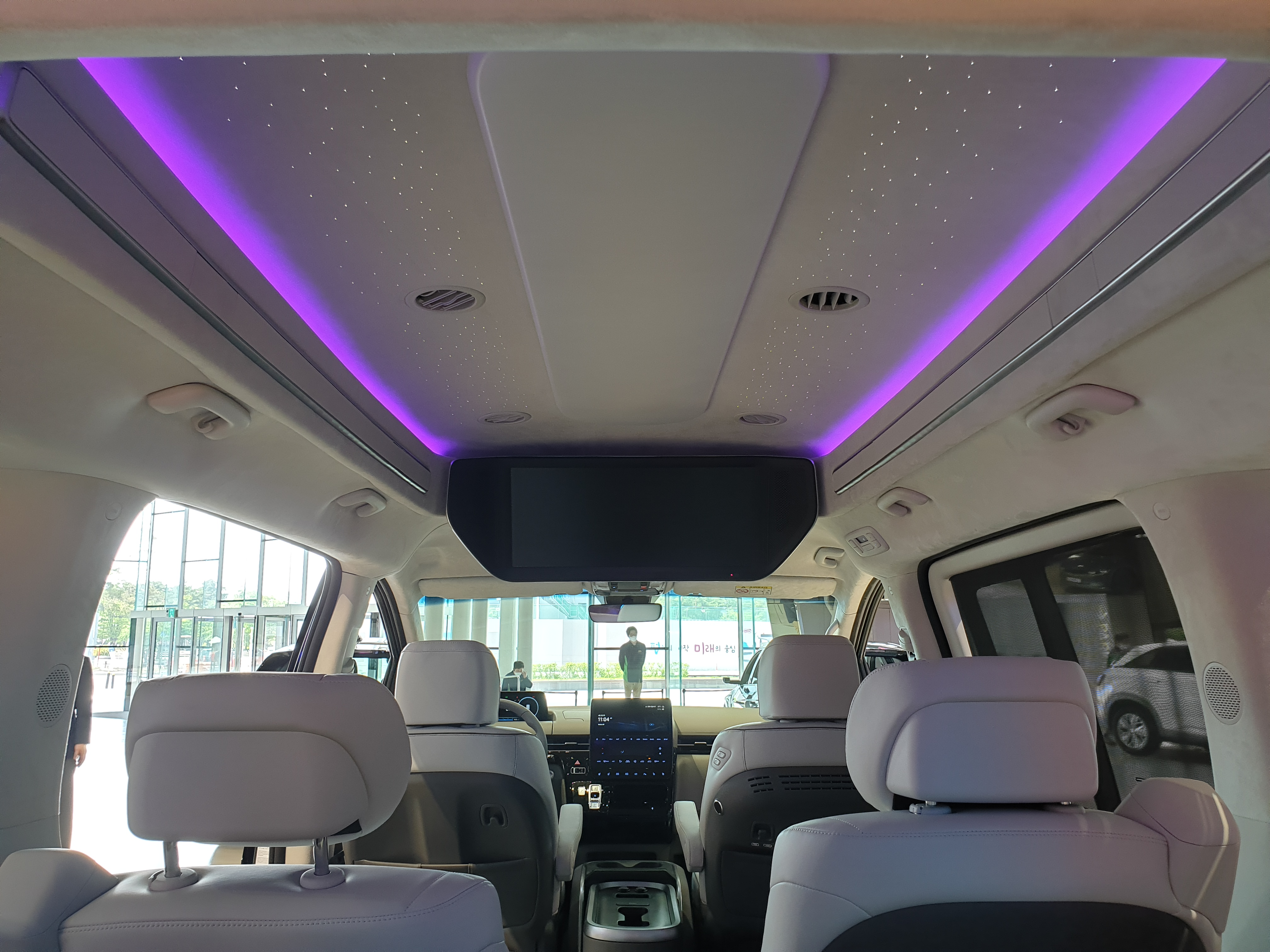
Interior

=== Staria Lounge Camper ===
It was released on 19 April 2022. The Staria Lounge Camper is a camping car model with specifications for camping in the Staria Lounge Prestige trim. It consists of two models: 11-seater semi-type Camper 11 and 4-seater deluxe type Camper 4. It can be used as a sleeping space by adjusting the angle of the second row full flat sheet or lifting the loop upward. The Camper 4 is fitted with an integrated 12.1-inch foldable controller and monitor, a third-row reclining bench, and a 36-litre (9.5 US gal) built-in refrigerator and sink.

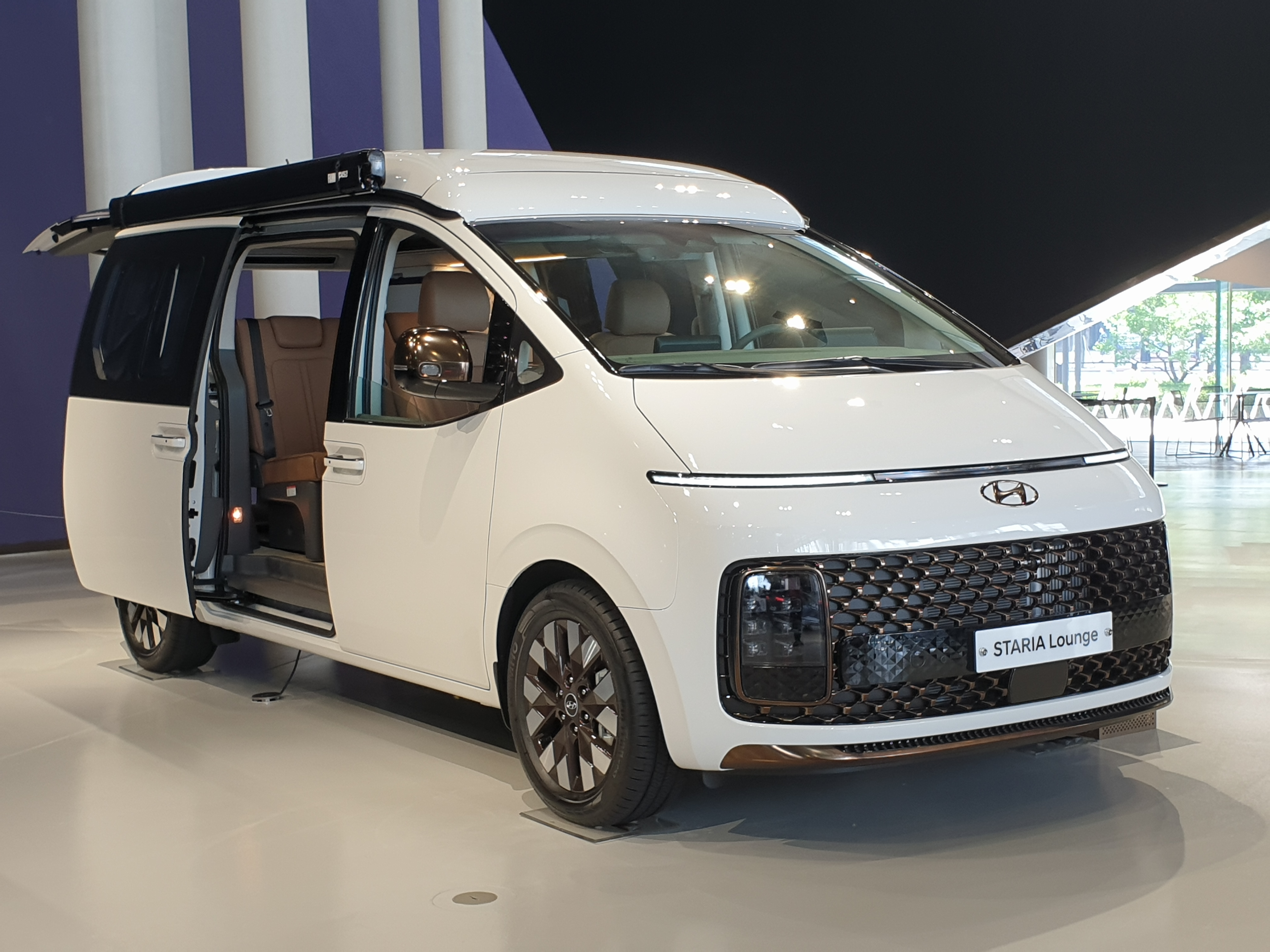
Front view

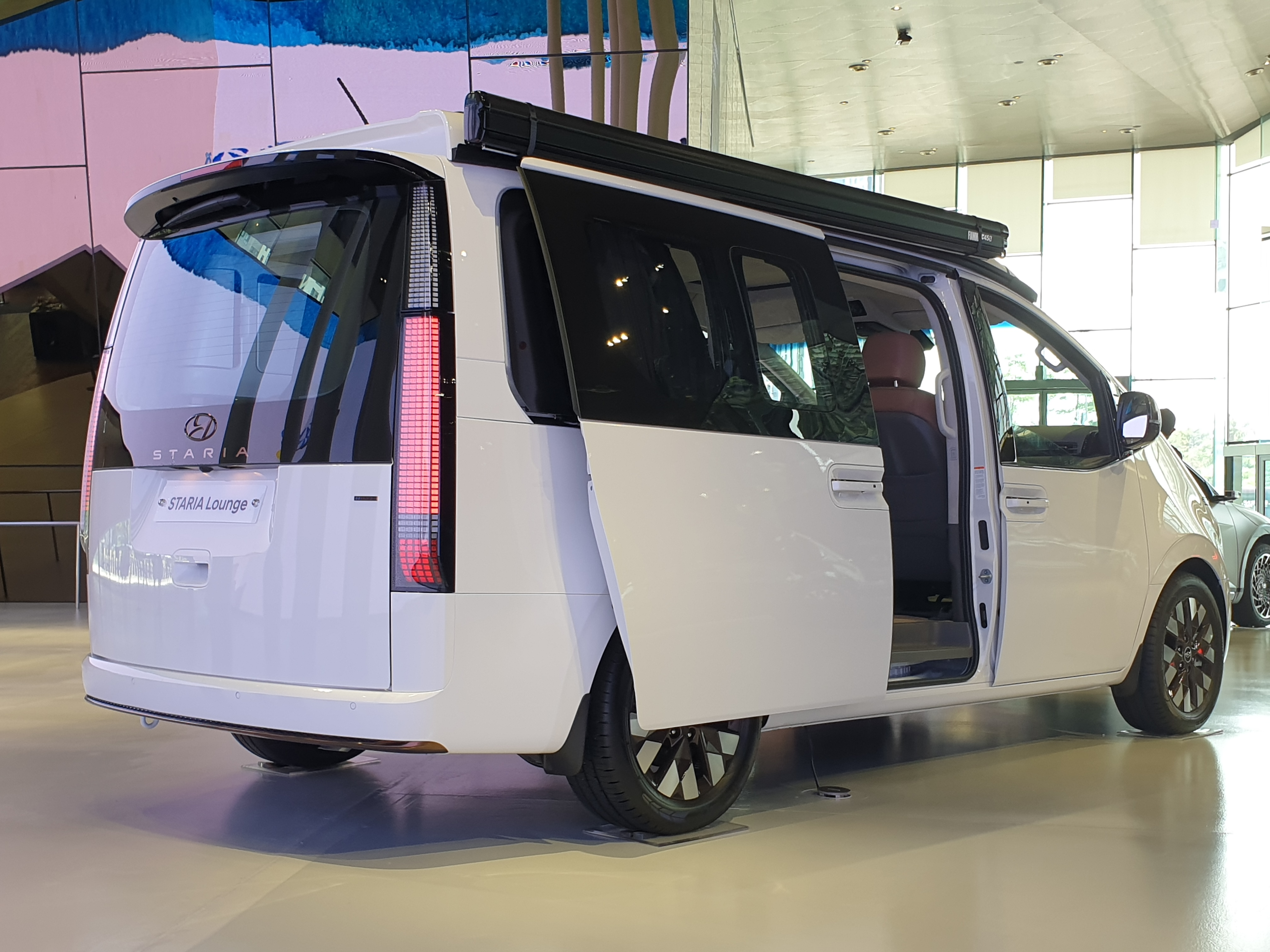
Rear view

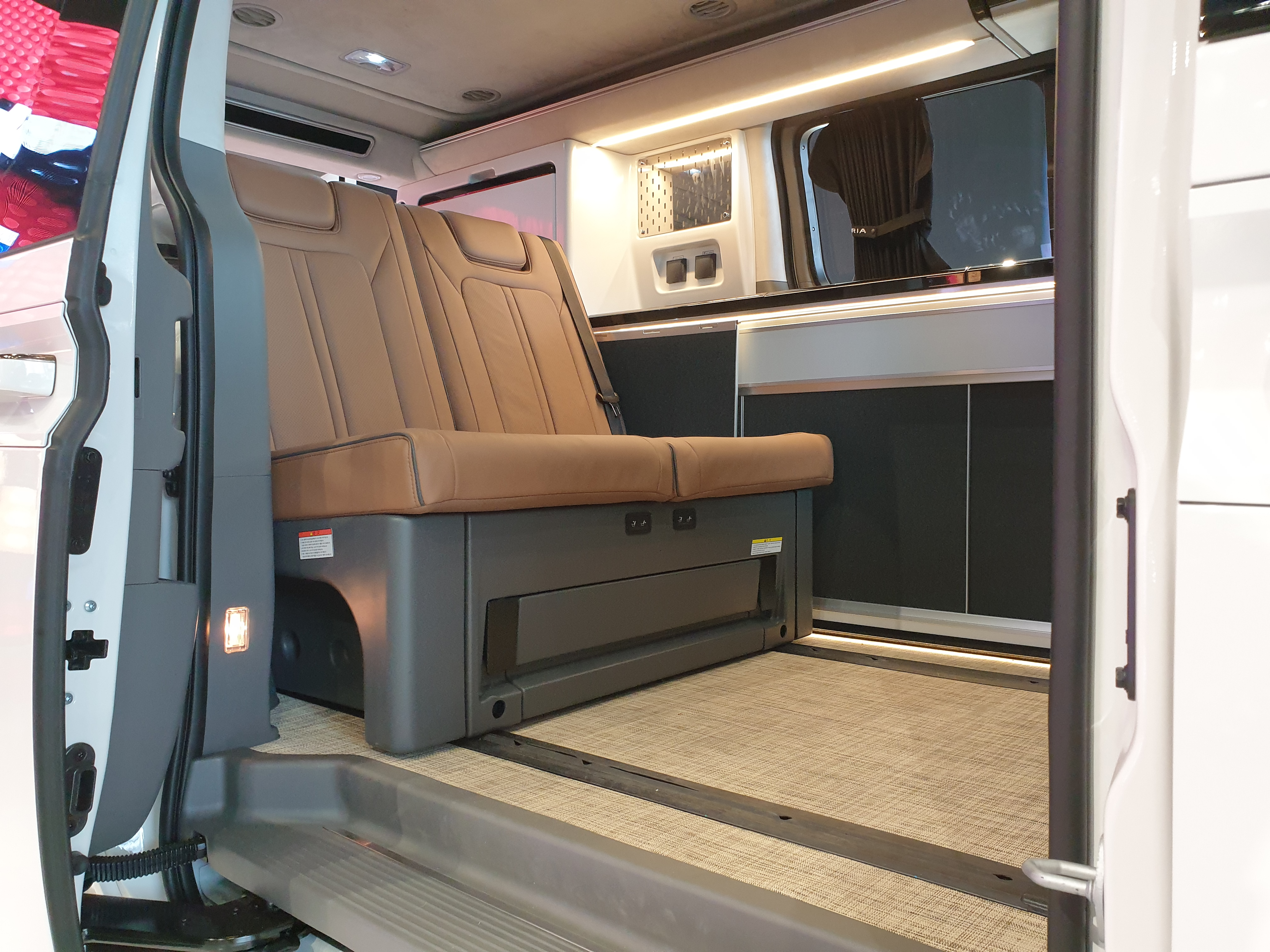
Interior

=== ST1 ===
The Hyundai ST1 is an electric truck based on the Staria. It was released on 14 March 2024, and sales in the South Korean market began on April 24 of the same year.

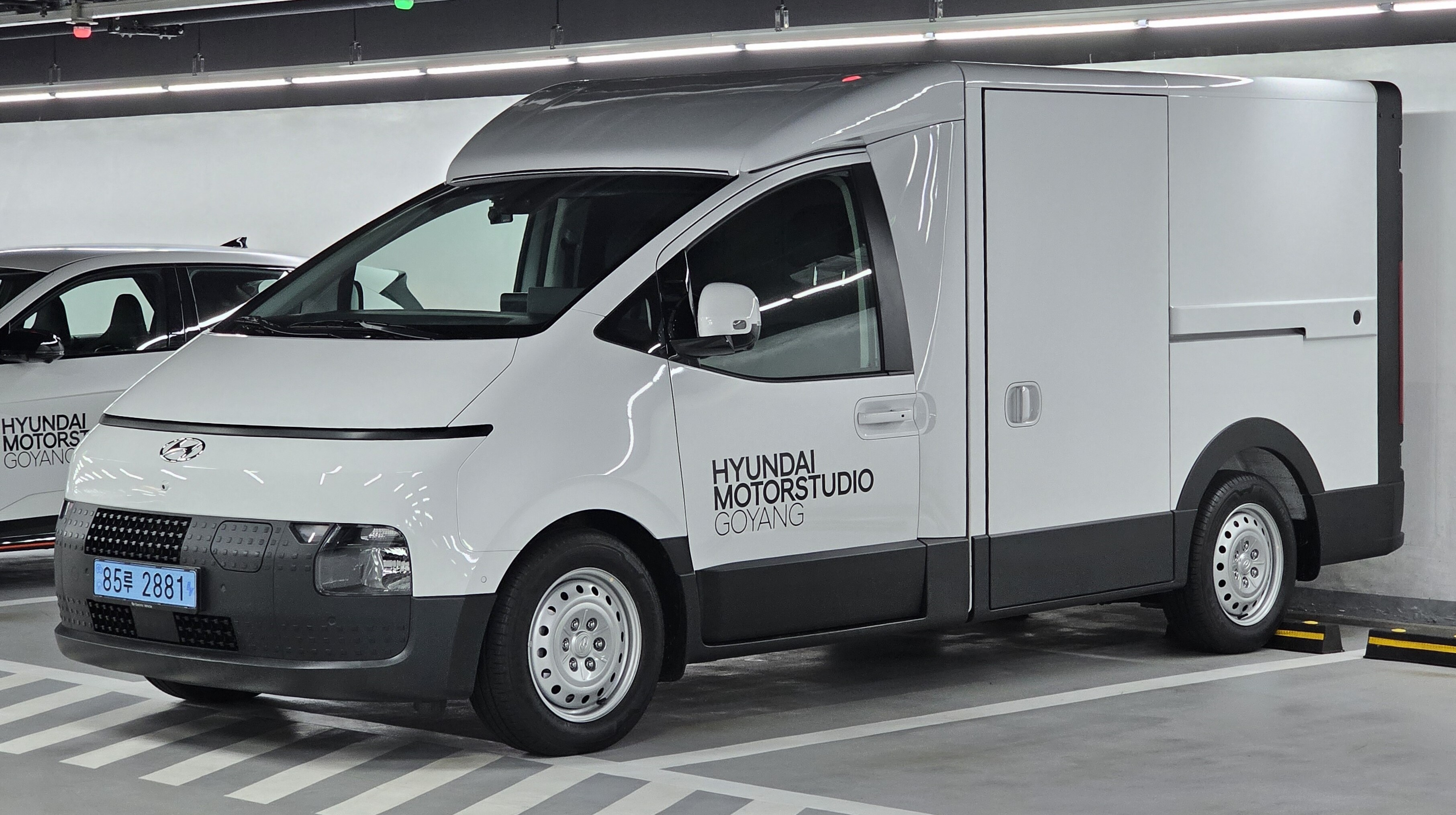
Hyundai ST1 Cargo

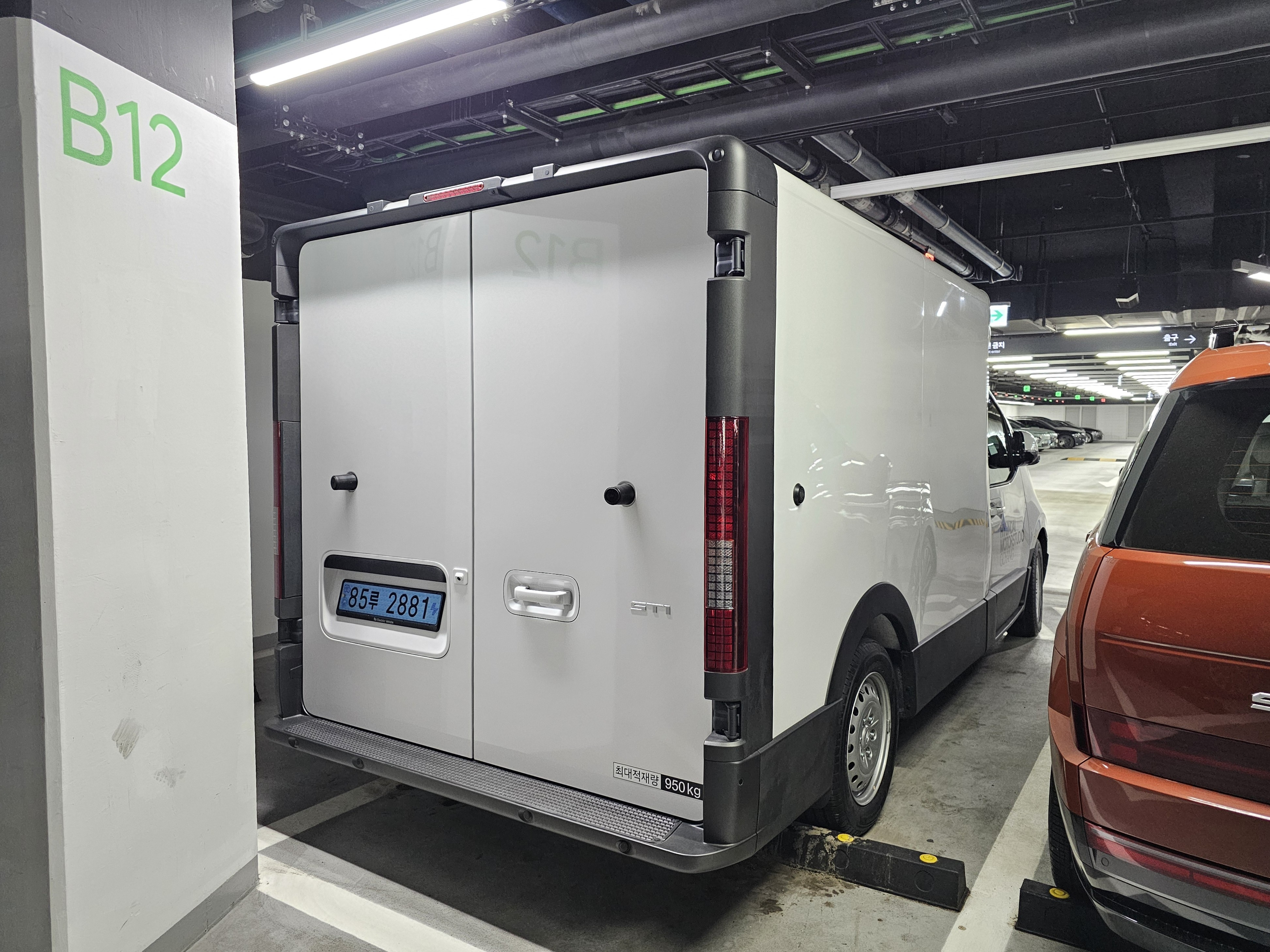
Hyundai ST1 rear view

== Facelift (2026) ==
The facelifted Hyundai Staria was unveiled in South Korea on 17 December 2025 as a major mid-cycle update for the 2026 model year. It introduced revised styling, a substantially updated cabin, new infotainment technology, and revised powertrain availability.

The exterior received a cleaner, more integrated front-end design. The previous three-piece daytime-running-light arrangement was replaced by an uninterrupted full-width LED light bar, while the lower headlights and air-intake areas were redesigned. The rear also gained updated lighting and bumper details, giving the van a more contemporary appearance while retaining its distinctive one-box silhouette.

Inside, the facelift replaced the former dual 10.25-inch displays with two 12.3-inch screens for the digital instrument cluster and infotainment system. The dashboard was redesigned with a more horizontal layout, new air vents, additional storage areas, and more physical controls. Hyundai also updated the infotainment software, steering wheel, and driver-assistance features, while improving perceived cabin quality and convenience.

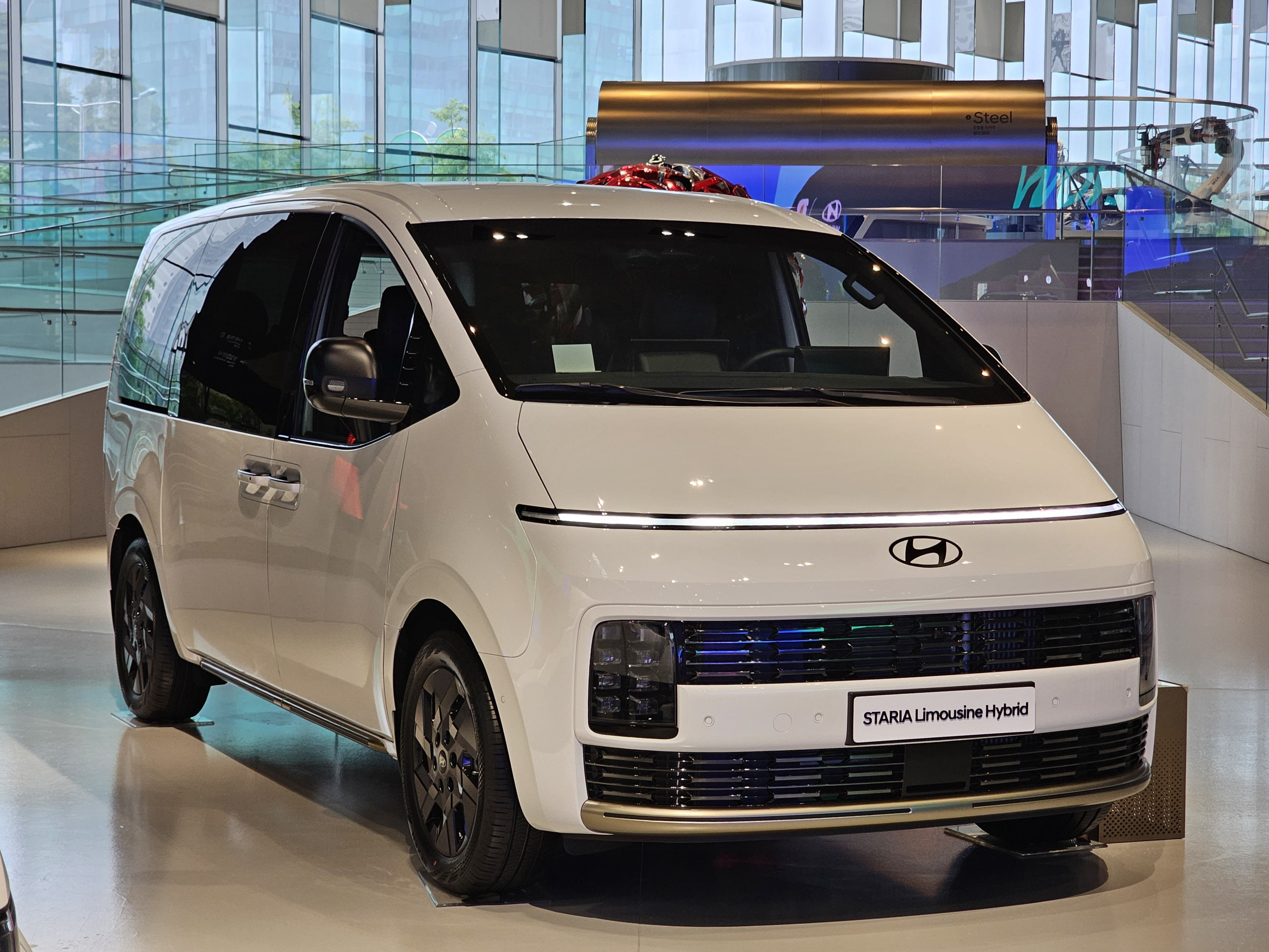
Front view

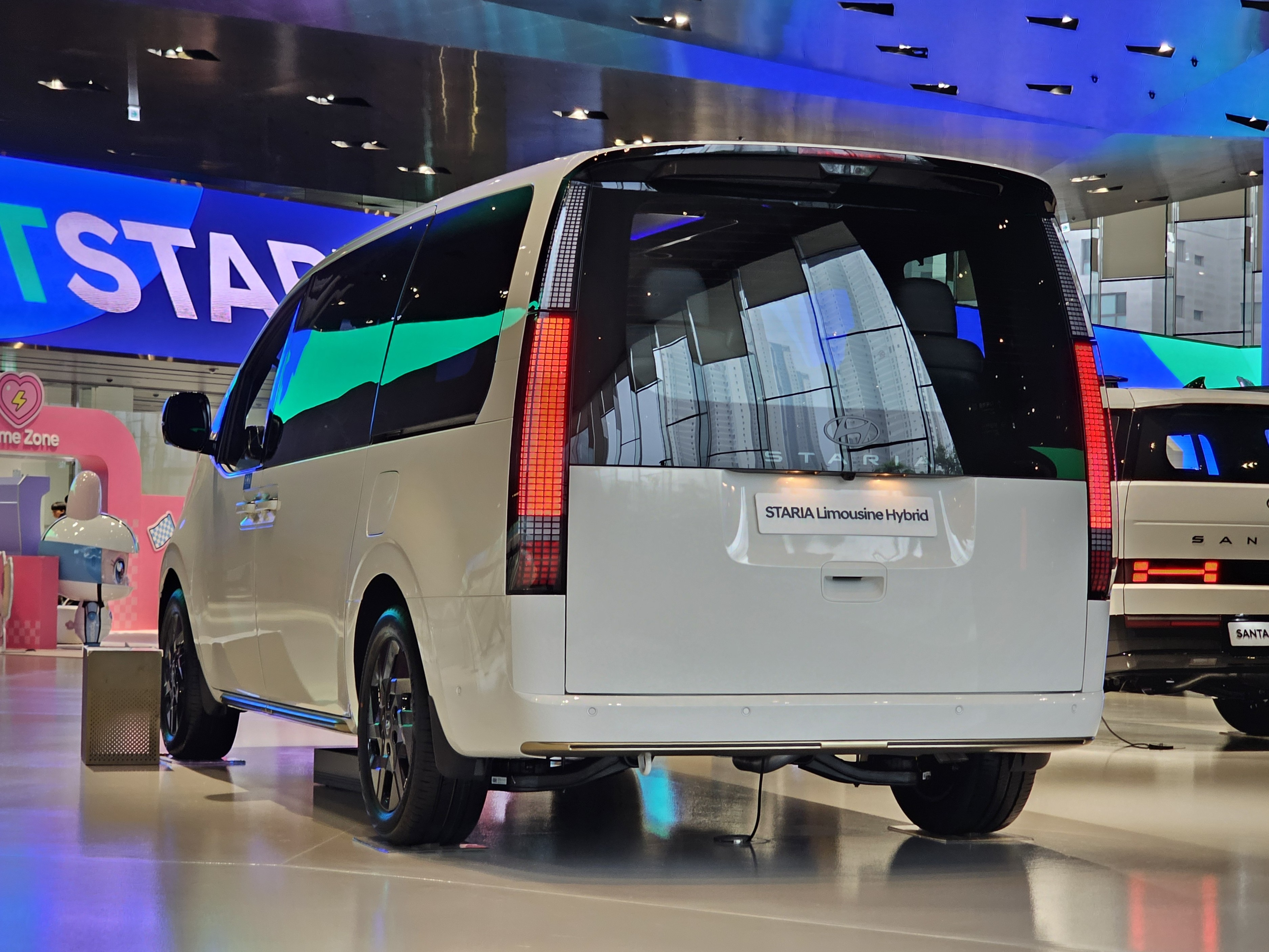
Rear view

=== Staria Electric ===
The Staria Electric is a battery electric version of the Hyundai Staria. It was unveiled at the 2026 Brussels Motor Show on 9 January 2026 and launched in South Korea in April 2026, with European sales beginning during the first half of the year.

The Staria Electric uses an 84-kWh lithium-ion battery and a front-mounted electric motor producing 160 kW (218 PS) and 350 Nm of torque. It is built on an 800-volt electrical architecture and supports DC fast charging at up to 350 kW, allowing a 10–80% charge in approximately 20 minutes. Its WLTP driving range is estimated at up to 430 km, depending on the version and market.

The model is offered in passenger and cargo configurations, including Tourer, Lounge, and Cargo variants. It retains the Staria’s spacious interior and adds EV-specific features such as a front trunk, vehicle-to-load capability, and Hyundai SmartSense driver-assistance systems.

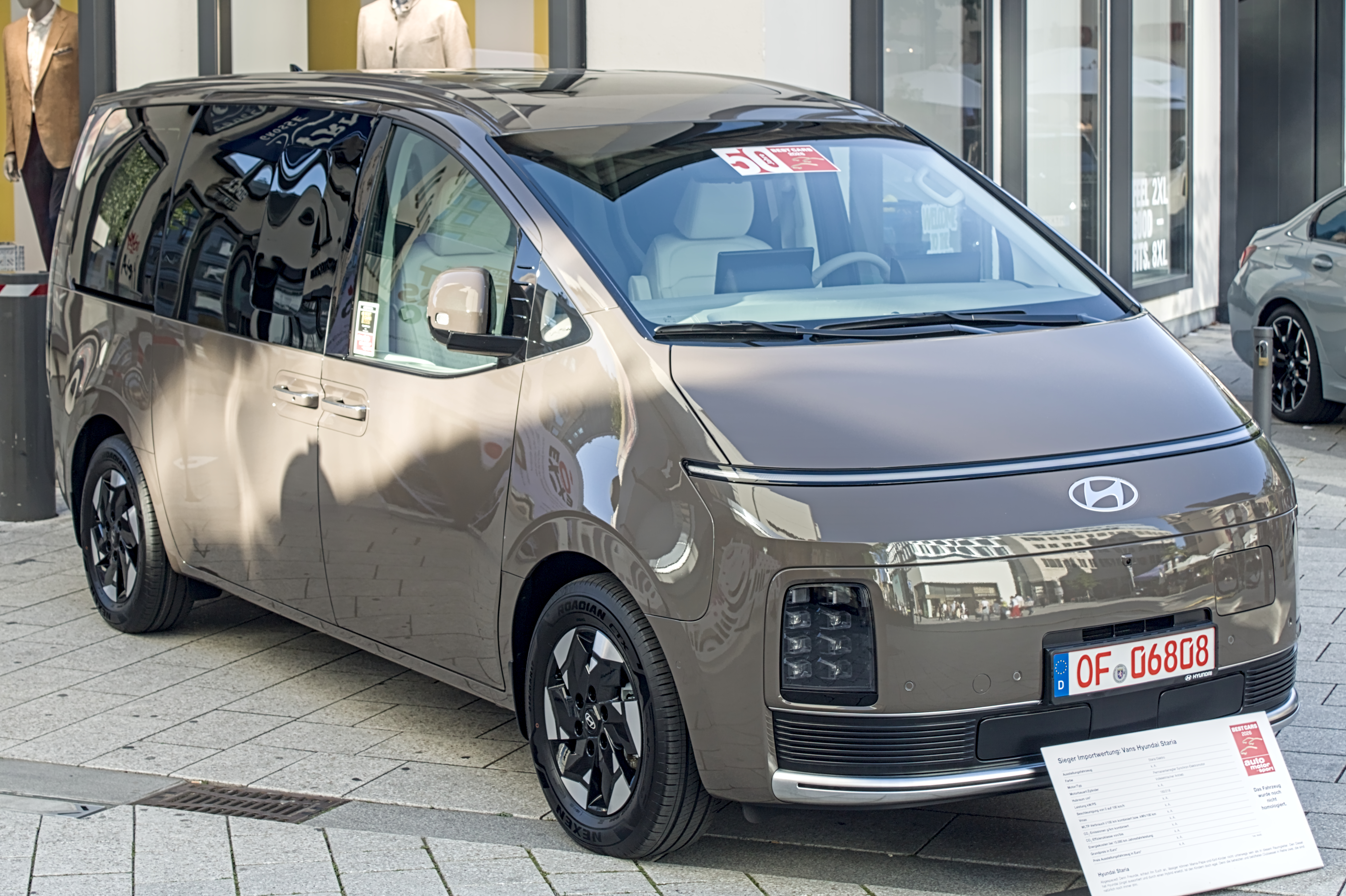
Staria Electric

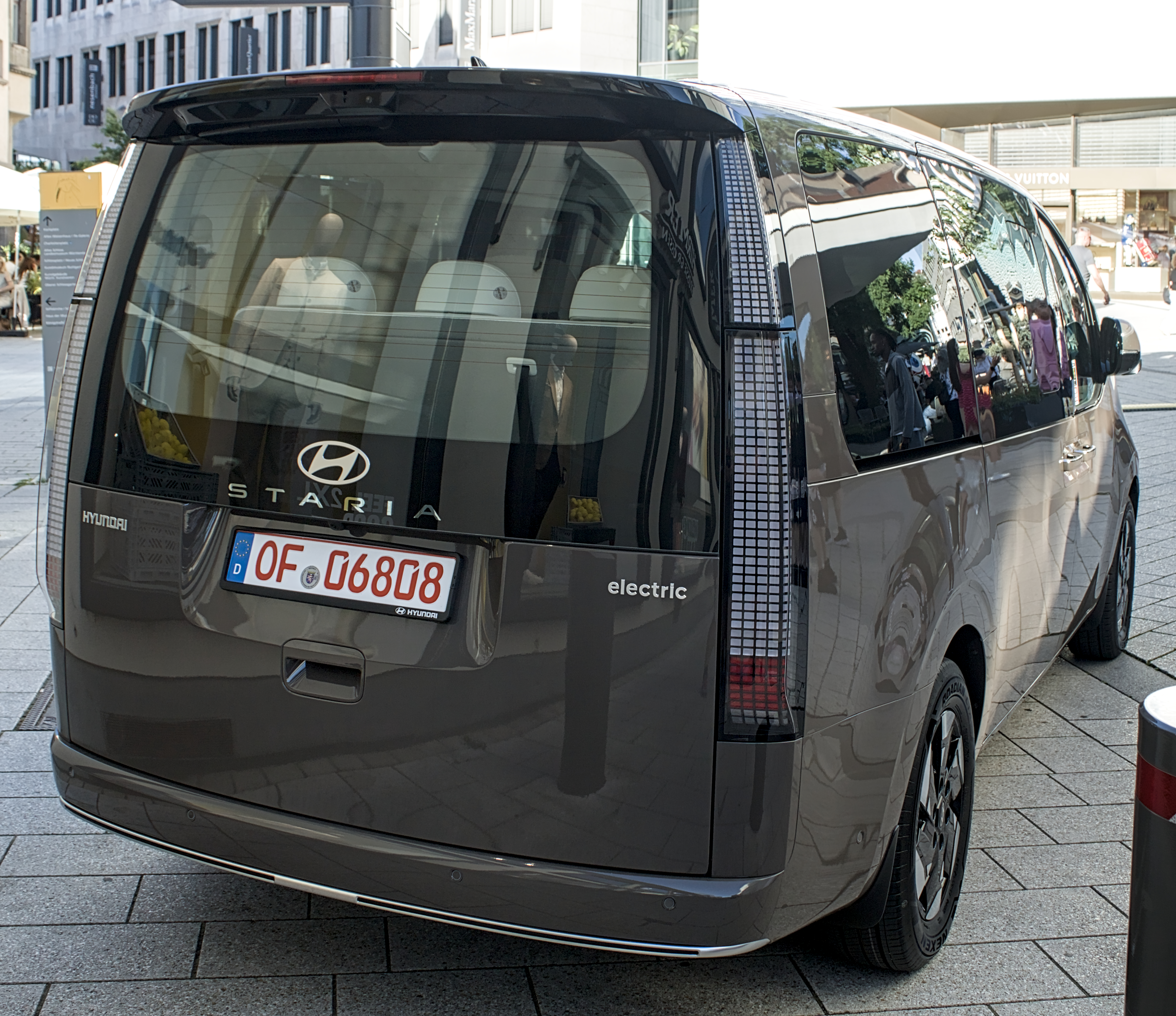
Rear

== Markets ==
=== Africa ===
==== South Africa ====
The Staria was launched in South Africa on 5 November 2021, with three trim levels available: Executive, Elite and Luxury. All trim levels comes as a 9-seater configuration, an 11-seater configuration option is available for the Executive grade.

In January 2022, the Staria Multicab was launched to replace the H1 Multicab, in 5-seater configuration.

In July 2022, the Staria Panel Van was launched to replace the H1, in 3-seater configuration, comes with twin-swing split doors.

The facelifted Staria was launched in South Africa on 9 September 2026, with five variants: Panelvan (3-seater), Executive Bus (9-seater), Executive Bus (11-seater), Elite Bus (9-seater) and Luxury Bus (9-seater), all variants are powered by the 2.2-litre CRDi diesel engine.

=== Asia ===
==== Indonesia ====
The Staria was launched in Indonesia on 20 August 2021, as an upscale version marketed simply as the Staria. It is offered in a sole Signature trim, with 9 and 7 seater configurations.

A facelift version was unveiled at the 2026 Gaikindo Indonesia International Auto Show along with electric model.

==== Malaysia ====
The Staria was launched in Malaysia on 27 October 2021, firstly in the upscale Premium trim as a 7-seater configuration, to replace the Grand Starex. On 5 October 2022, the standard Staria debuted in Malaysia in three trim levels: Lite, Plus and Max. All non-upscale Staria variants comes as a 10-seater configuration. In July 2025, the Staria line-up was updated with changes to equipment and new names for the trim levels consists of Style (replaced Lite), Prime (replaced Plus), Prestige (replaced Max). In October 2025, the Staria became locally assembled at Inokom plant in Kulim, Kedah.

==== Philippines ====
The Staria went on sale in the Philippines in August 2022, with four grades available at launch: Cargo (3-seater), Commuter (11-seater), GLS+ (11-seater), and Premium+ (7-seater). Unlike other ASEAN countries, the Philippine-spec Staria Premium is offered with the HTRAC all-wheel drive system. In October 2023, a new Premium+ (9-seater) variant was added, with the H-TRAC all-wheel drive system.

The facelifted Staria was launched in the Philippines on 9 July 2026. It is available in four grades with six variants: Cargo (3-seater), GL (9- and 11-seater), GLS (9-seater), and Premium (9- and 7-seater). The Cargo variant retains the 2.2-litre CRDi diesel engine, while the rest of the lineup is powered with a 1.6-litre T-GDi petrol hybrid.

==== Singapore ====
The Staria was launched in Singapore on 10 December 2021, solely in the upscale version as a 7-seater configuration, it is powered solely by a 3.5-litre MPi V6 petrol engine.

==== Taiwan ====
The Staria was launched in Taiwan on 15 February 2022, with five variants: GLD-A and GLD-B (9-seater), GLD-C (8-seater), and CEO-A and CEO-B (7-seater). In September 2025, the Staria Van (3-seater) and Staria Camper models were introduced in Taiwan.

==== Thailand ====
The Staria was launched in Thailand on 9 July 2021, the first RHD country to debut the Staria. At launch, two trim levels are available: S and SEL. Both trim levels of the Staria come as an 11-seater configuration. The Staria Premium, the upscale version, debuted in Thailand in 22 March 2022, as an 11-seater configuration.

In December 2023, the Staria was discontinued in Thailand, because it used a Euro 4 diesel engine, which is against the requirements in Thailand, but began use of other new models with a Euro 5 diesel engine from January 2024. Hyundai Mobility Thailand confirms it will not replace a new diesel engine in Staria.

In March 2024, the Staria was re-introduced in Thailand, use a D4HB diesel engine still to same but adjusting a Euro 4 replace for a Euro 5. The three trim levels available were: Trend (was later renamed to Trend S), Style and Premium (with the option of a deleted sunroof). The entry-level Elite trim was added in 4 October 2024. The Elite Plus trim was added in 24 March 2025. The Essence trim was added in 28 November 2025.

In 26 June 2026, the Staria was updated for the 2026 model year in Thailand, it became imported from Malaysia instead of South Korea, two trim levels are available: Elite Plus and Premium with Sunroof.

The facelifted Staria was launched in Thailand on 10 September 2026, with two trim levels: Modern and Premium, powered by a 1.6-litre T-GDi petrol hybrid.

=== Europe ===
The Staria Electric made its European debut in January 2026 at the 2026 Brussels Motor Show, with European order books opened in September 2026. It is available with two versions: Luxury (7-seater) and Wagon (9-seater).

=== Latin America ===
==== Argentina ====
The Staria was launched in Argentina on 28 September 2022, in the sole unnamed variant with an 11-seat configuration powered by the 2.2-litre CRDi diesel engine.

=== Oceania ===
==== Australia ====
The Staria was launched in Australia on 5 August 2021, in three trim levels: Standard, Elite and Highlander. Two engine options are available: a 3.5-litre MPi V6 petrol and a 2.2-litre diesel, the latter option comes with all-wheel drive as standard. All Staria variants came as a 8-seater configuration.

In September 2021, the Staria Load panel van version debuted in Australia to replace the iLoad, in 2 and 5 seater configurations. The Staria Load has the option between a conventional Liftback tailgate or split Twin Swing doors.

In February 2023, a new Premium trim for the Staria Load was added, it comes solely with a liftgate.

The facelifted Staria and Staria Load models went on sale in Australia on 2 April 2026. The Staria passenger van model is available with two trim levels: Staria and Lounge (replaced both the Elite and Highlander trims from the pre-facelift model), it is available with a 3.5-litre MPi V6 petrol, a 2.2-litre CRDi diesel and a 1.6-litre T-GDi petrol hybrid. The Staria Load commercial van model is available with two trim levels: Staria Load and Premium, it is available with a 2.2-litre CRDi diesel and a 1.6-litre T-GDi petrol hybrid. In September 2026, the Staria Load became available with the Electric version as the flagship variant.

==== New Zealand ====
The Staria was launched in New Zealand on 10 August 2021, in two variants: Standard and Limited AWD (later renamed to Elite), both variants come as an 8-seater configuration. The Staria Load panel van version was available, it comes with 2-and 5-seater configurations and has the option for a 6-speed manual.

=== Russia ===
The Staria was released in Russia by Hyundai Motor CIS in February 2022. At launch, the Staria is available in five trim levels: Family, Lifestyle, Prestige, High-Tech, and Premium. In Russia, the Staria comes as a 8-seater configuration for all trim levels except the Premium that comes as a 7-seater. Two engine options are available: a 3.5-litre MPi V6 petrol and a 2.2-litre diesel, the latter is available with the option of HTRAC all-wheel drive system for the Staria passenger version. The panel van version is available as the Staria Van, in a 3-seater configuration, it is available in three trim levels: Classic, Comfort and Comfort Plus; the Staria Van has the option of a 6-speed manual.

== Safety ==
ANCAP test results Hyundai Staria (2021, aligned with Euro NCAP)
| Test | Points | % |
|---|---|---|
| Overall: | 5 /5 stars | |
| Adult occupant: | 32.38 | 85% |
| Child occupant: | 42.32 | 86% |
| Pedestrian: | 35.37 | 65% |
| Safety assist: | 11.90 | 74% |

ANCAP test results Hyundai Staria-Load automatic variants only (2021, aligned with Euro NCAP)
| Test | Points | % |
|---|---|---|
| Overall: | 5 /5 stars | |
| Adult occupant: | 32.38 | 85% |
| Child occupant: | N/A | N/A% |
| Pedestrian: | 35.37 | 65% |
| Safety assist: | 11.90 | 74% |

ANCAP test results Hyundai Staria-Load automatic variants (2022)
Overall
| Grading: | 90% (Platinum) |

== Powertrain ==
Specs
| Model | Years | Type | Transmission | Power | Torque | Acceleration 0–100 km/h (0-62 mph) (Official) | Top speed |
Petrol
| Smartstream G3.5 MPi | 2021–present | 3,470 cc (212 cu in) V6 | 8-speed automatic | 272 PS (268 hp; 200 kW) @ 6,400 rpm | 33.8 kg⋅m (331 N⋅m; 244 lbf⋅ft) @ 5,000 rpm | 8.9s | 210 km/h (130 mph) |
Hybrid
| Smartstream G1.6 T-GDi | 2024–present | 1,598 cc (97.5 cu in) turbocharged I4 | 6-speed automatic | 245 PS (242 hp; 180 kW) @ 5,500 rpm | 37.4 kg⋅m (367 N⋅m; 271 lbf⋅ft) | 10.2s (FWD) | |
LPG
| Smartstream L3.5 LPi | 2021–present | 3,470 cc (212 cu in) V6 | 8-speed automatic | 240 PS (237 hp; 177 kW) @ 6,000 rpm | 32 kg⋅m (310 N⋅m; 230 lbf⋅ft) @ 4,500 rpm | | |
Diesel
| R II 2.2 CRDi | 2021–present | 2,199 cc (134.2 cu in) I4 | 6-speed manual | 177 PS (175 hp; 130 kW) @ 3,800 rpm | 44 kg⋅m (431 N⋅m; 318 lbf⋅ft) @ 1,500–2,500 rpm | 12.5 (FWD) | 185 km/h (115 mph) |
| R II 2.2 CRDi | 2021–present | 2,199 cc (134.2 cu in) I4 | 8-speed automatic | 177 PS (175 hp; 130 kW) @ 3,800 rpm | 44 kg⋅m (431 N⋅m; 318 lbf⋅ft) @ 1,500–2,500 rpm | 12.4 (FWD); 13.5 (AWD) | 185 km/h (115 mph) |
