= Opel RAK e =

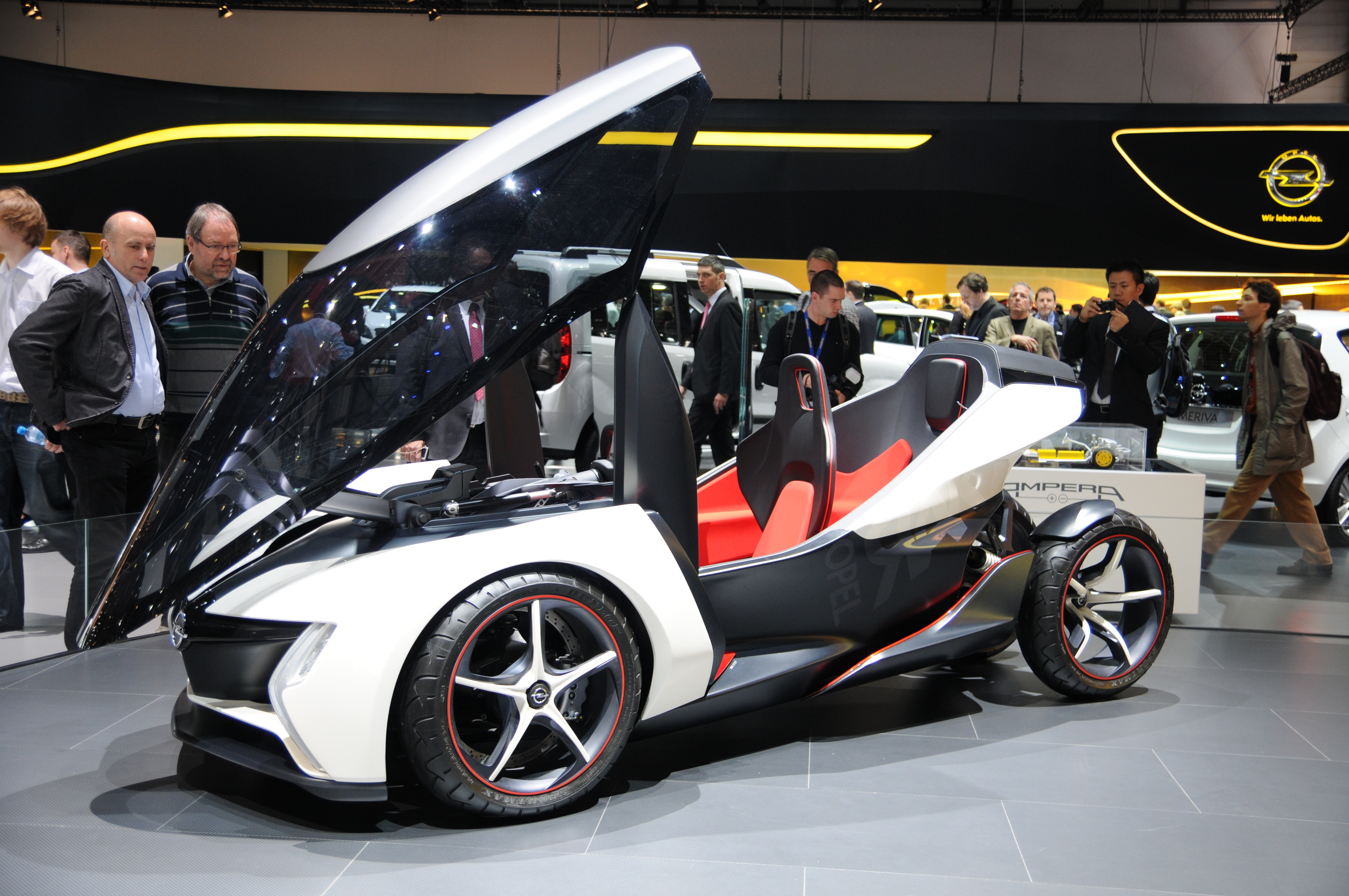

Overview
- Manufacturer: Opel
- Production: 2011 (Concept car)
- Designer: KISKA

Body and chassis
- Class: City car (A)
- Body style: 1-door hatchback
- Layout: front-wheel drive
- Doors: Canopy

Dimensions
- Length: 3,000 mm (118.1 in)
- Height: 1,190 mm (46.9 in)
- Kerb weight: 380 kg (840 lb)

The Opel RAK e is an electric two-seat city concept car produced by the German car manufacturer Opel. The RAK e premiered at the 2011 Frankfurt Motor Show. The name RAK e recalls the name of the rocket-powered RAK 2 from 1928, which included a canopy door. It was developed and designed in conjunction with KISKA, who also designed the KTM X-Bow.

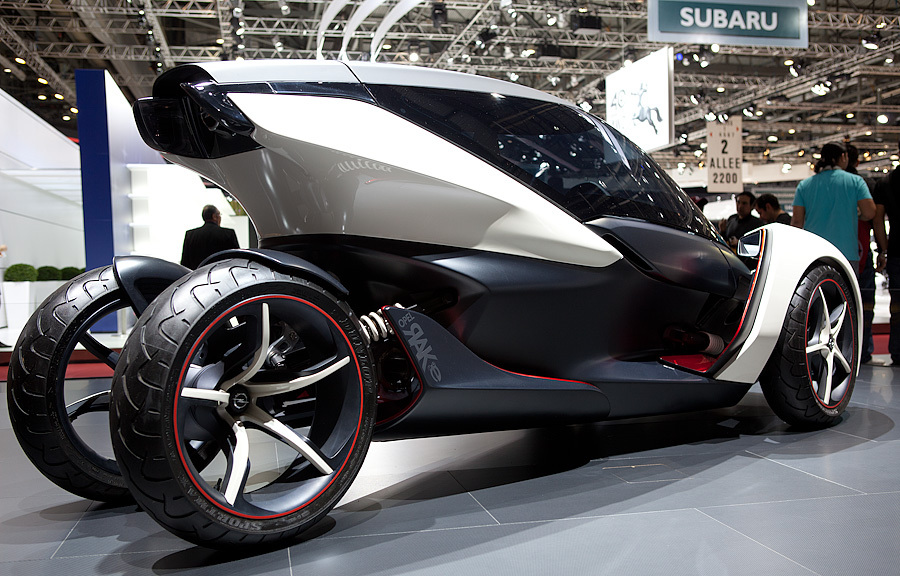
Rear view

The RAK e is a battery-powered electric car (officially a quadricycle) with a range of 100 kilometres, and a top speed of 120 km/h (75 mph). Peak power output is 36.5 kW (50 PS; 49 bhp) of which 10.5 kW (14 PS; 14 bhp) is continuously available. The usable battery has the capacity of 5 kWh.
