= Renault Frendzy =

Concept leisure activity vehicle designed by Renault

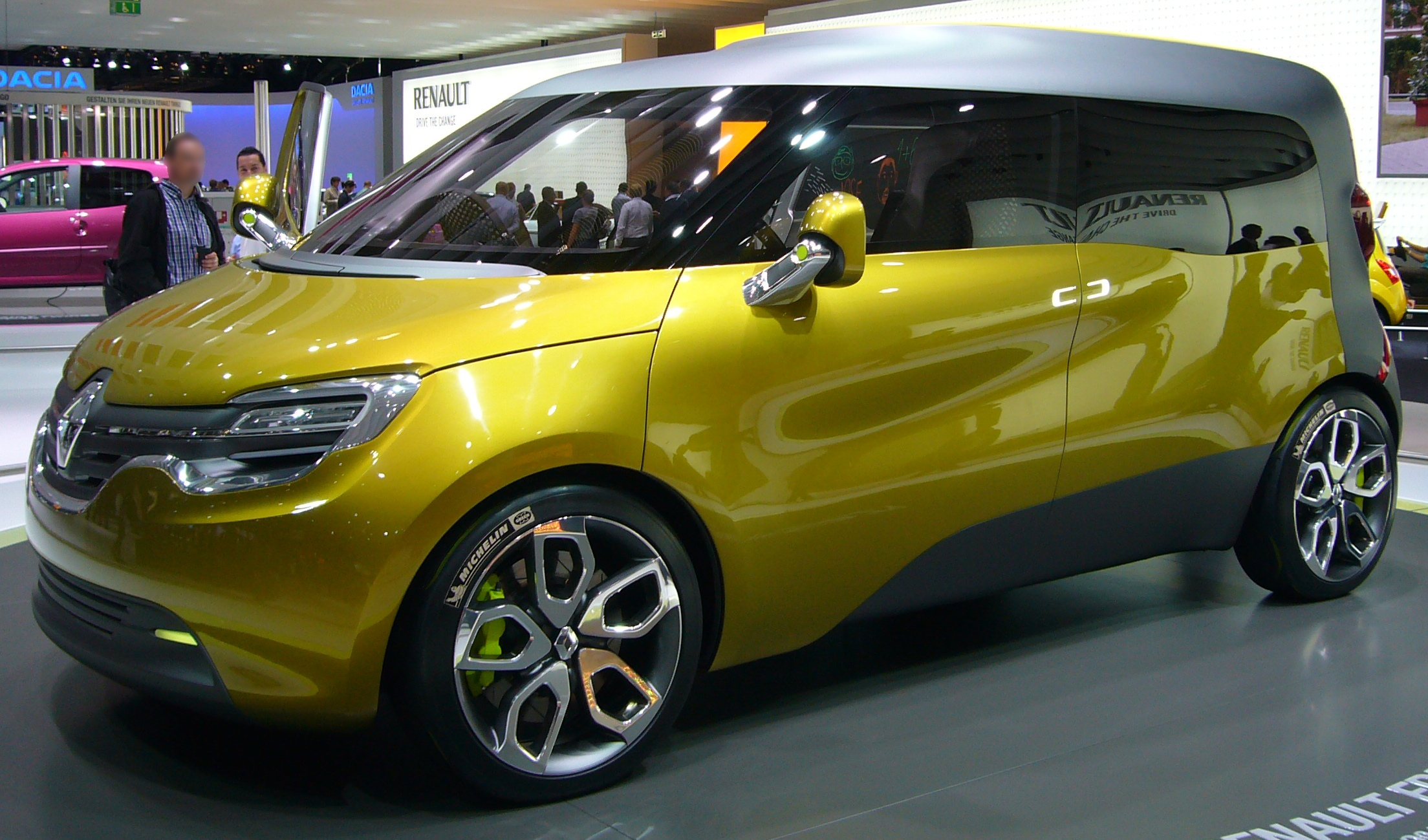

Overview
- Manufacturer: Renault
- Production: 2011 (Concept car)
- Designer: Deyan Denkov; Under the lead of Laurens van den Acker

Body and chassis
- Class: Leisure activity vehicle (M-segment)
- Body style: 5-door van
- Layout: FF layout
- Related: Renault Kangoo Z.E.

Powertrain
- Engine: Electric motor

Dimensions
- Length: 4,091 mm (161.1 in)
- Width: 1,872 mm (73.7 in)
- Height: 1,743 mm (68.6 in)

The Renault Frendzy was a concept leisure activity vehicle (M-segment) designed by Renault for the 2011 Frankfurt Motor Show at a similar size to the production Renault Kangoo. Its concept was designed by Renault's design chief Laurens Van den Acker with the exterior design accredited to Deyan Denkov.

== Technical details ==
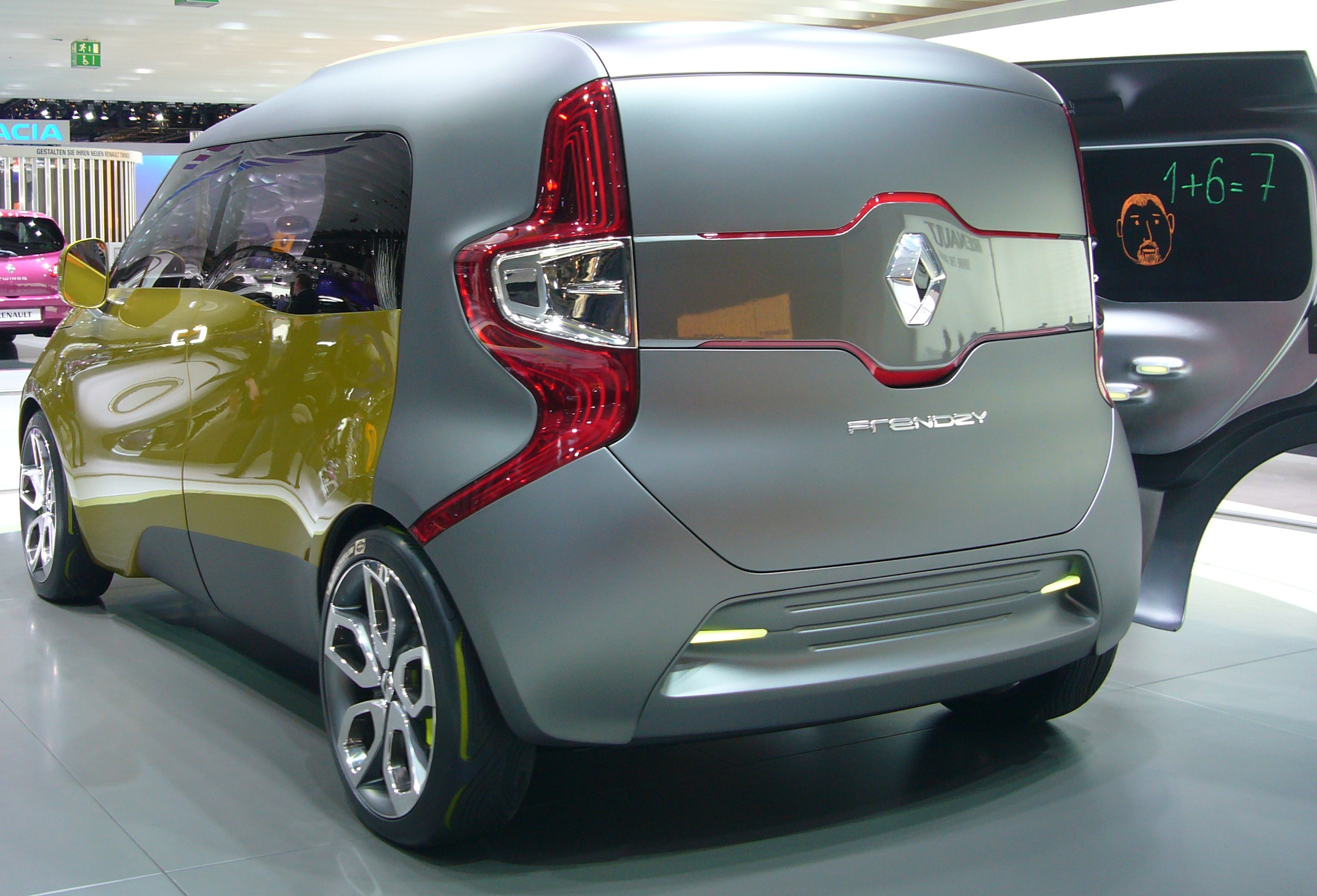
Renault Frendzy rear

The Frendzy is based on the Renault Kangoo Z.E. and is powered by an electric motor developing 59 bhp (44 kW; 60 PS) and is equipped with a lithium-ion battery pack.
