= Government incentives for plug-in electric vehicles =

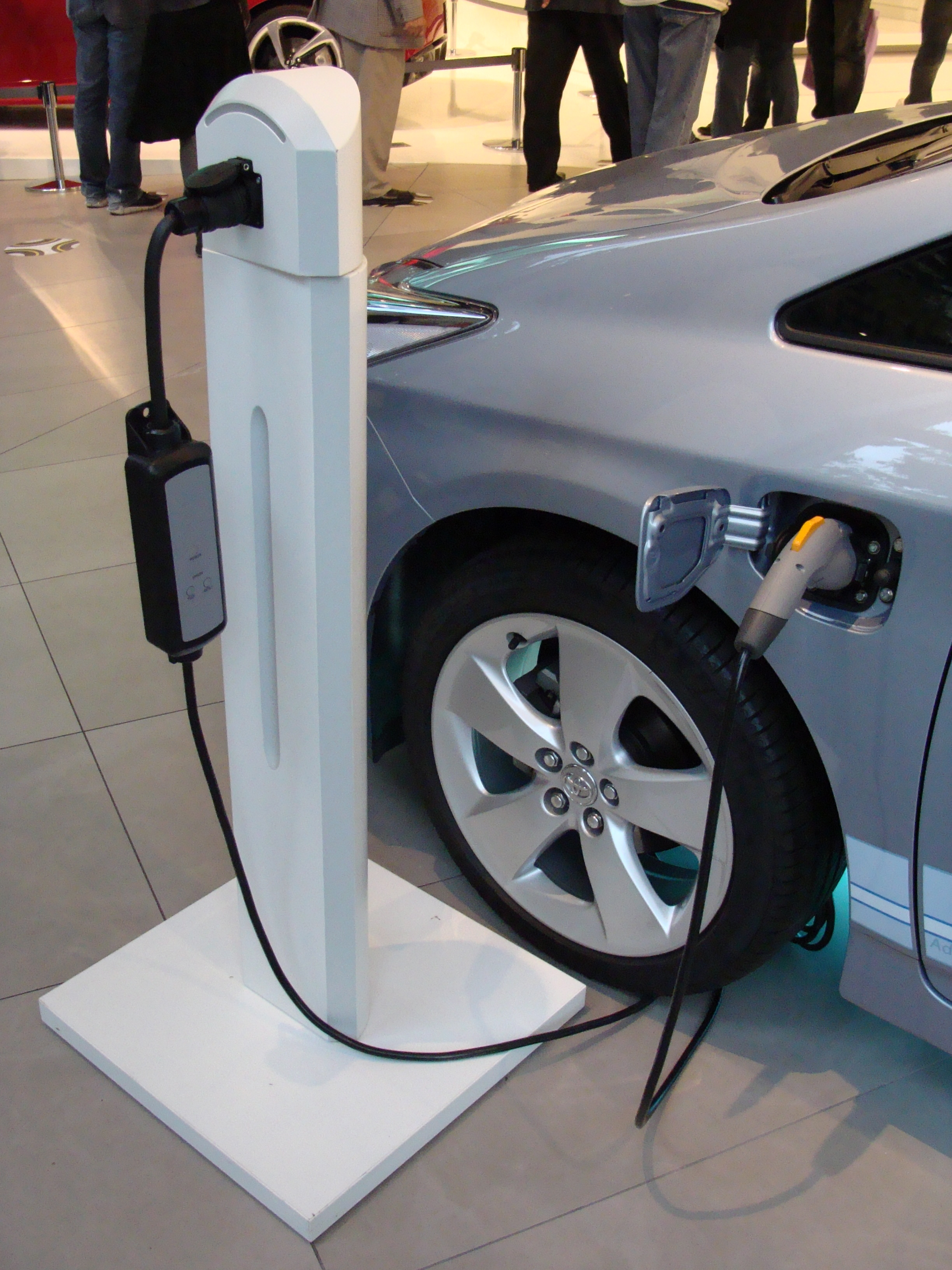
Plug-in electric vehicles subject to incentives in some countries include battery electric vehicles, plug-in hybrids and electric vehicle conversions. Shown here is a Toyota Prius Plug-in Hybrid recharging.

Government incentives for plug-in electric vehicles have been established around the world to support policy-driven adoption of plug-in electric vehicles. These incentives mainly take the form of purchase rebates, tax exemptions and tax credits, and additional perks that range from access to bus lanes to waivers on fees (charging, parking, tolls, etc.). The amount of the financial incentives may depend on vehicle battery size or all-electric range. Often hybrid electric vehicles are included. Some countries extend the benefits to fuel cell vehicles, and electric vehicle conversions.

More recently, some governments have also established long term regulatory signals with specific target timeframes such as ZEV mandates, national or regional CO_{2} emissions regulations, stringent fuel economy standards, and the phase-out of internal combustion engine vehicle sales. For example, Norway set a national goal that all new car sales by 2025 should be zero emission vehicles (electric or hydrogen). Other countries have announced similar targets for the electrification of their vehicle fleet, most within a timeframe between 2030 and 2050.

== Asia ==
=== China ===
Policy support for electric vehicles in China includes both government procurement and efforts to stimulate the private market for EVs. Measures include sales tax exemptions, consumer rebates, and easier access to license plates for EVs.

==== History ====
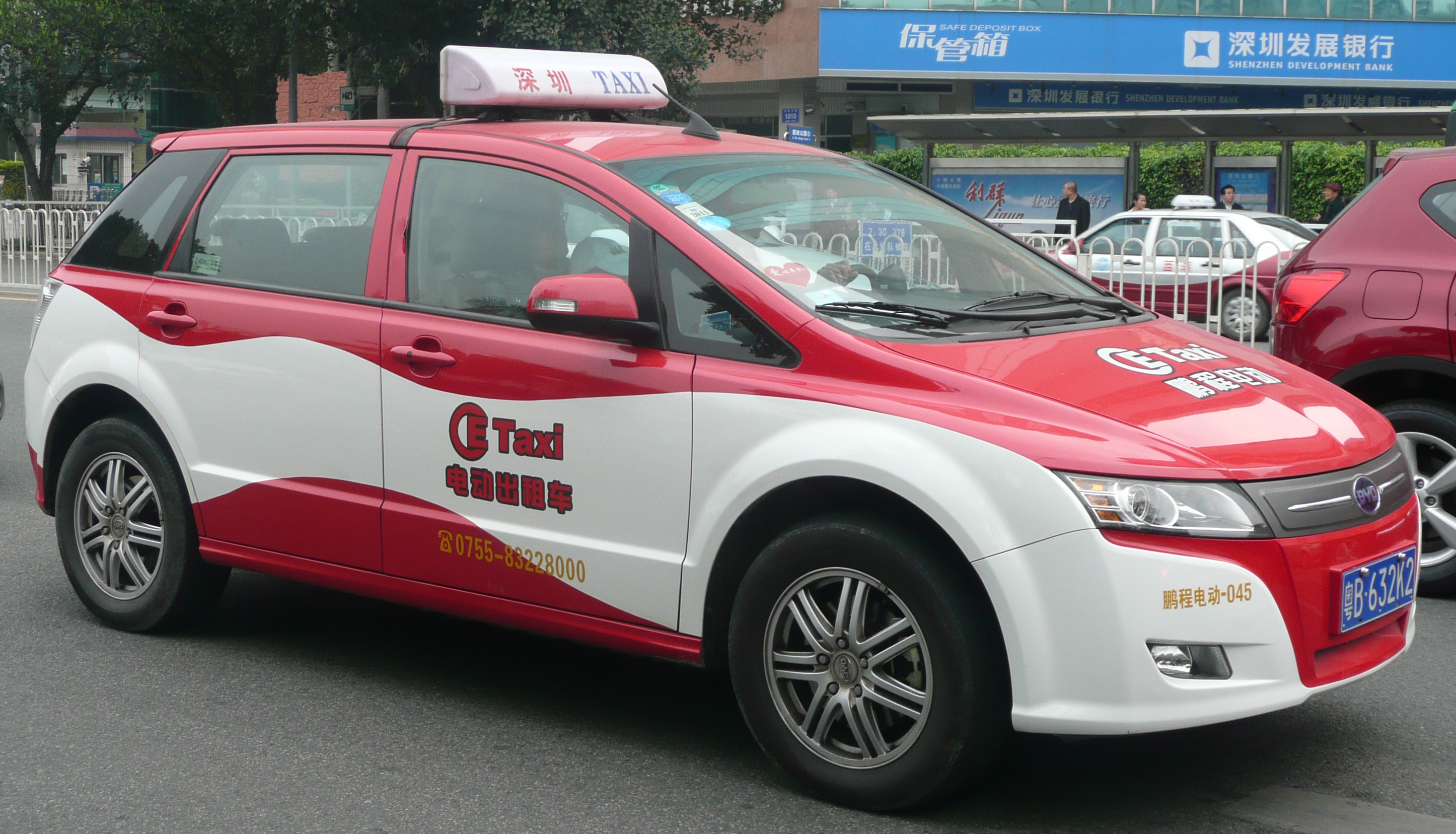
BYD e6 all-electric taxi in Shenzhen, China

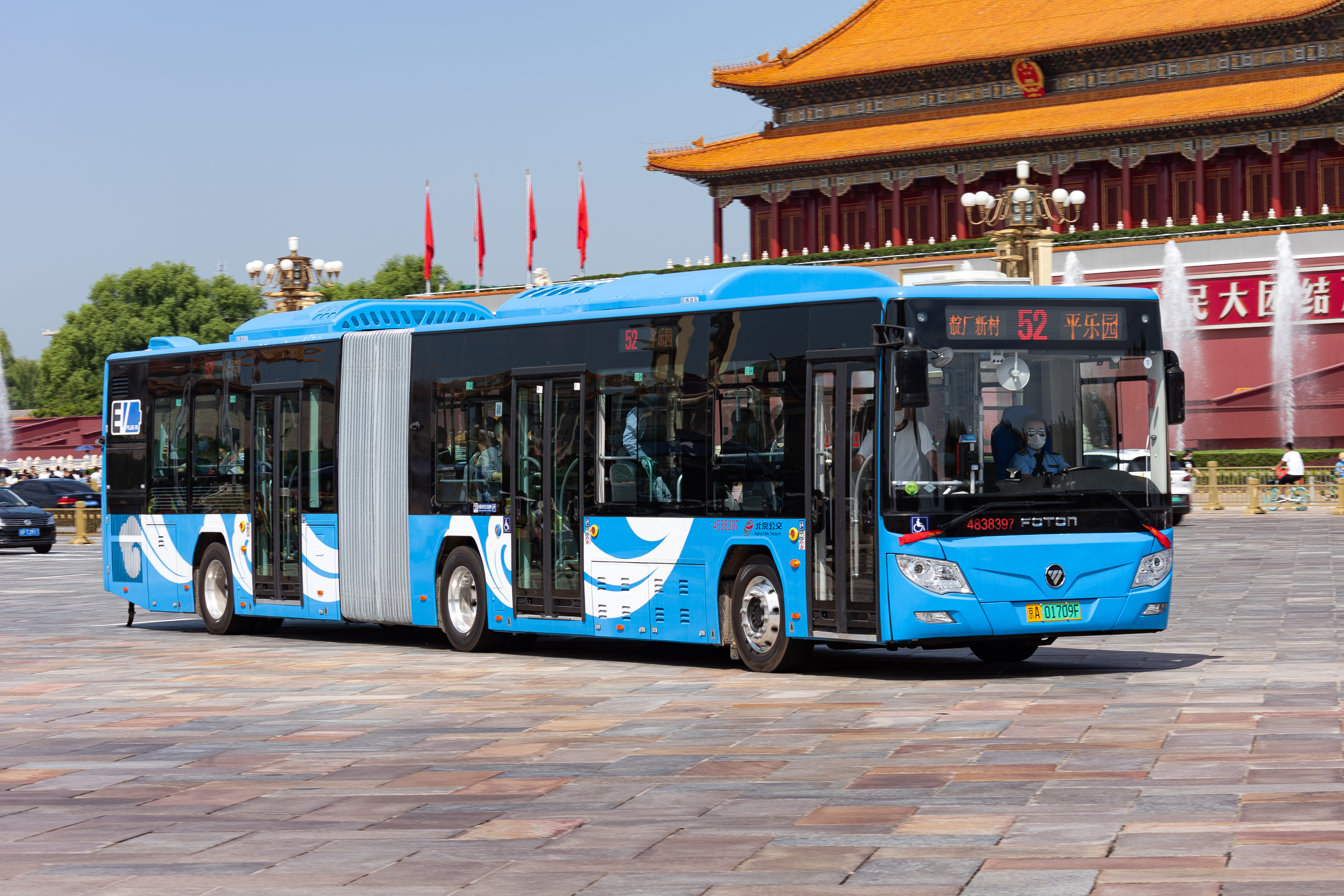
Foton BJ6160SHEVCA-3 plug-in hybrid bus in Beijing

The Chinese government adopted a plan in 2009 with the goal of turning the country into one of the leaders of all-electric and hybrid vehicles by 2012. The government's intention was to create a world-leading industry that would produce jobs and exports, and to reduce urban pollution and its oil dependence. However, a study found that even though local air pollution would be reduced by replacing a gasoline car with a similar-size electric car, it would reduce greenhouse gas emissions by only 19%, as China uses coal for 75% of its electricity production.

The Chinese government uses the term new energy vehicles (NEVs) to designate plug-in electric vehicles, and only pure electric vehicles and plug-in hybrid electric vehicles are subject to purchase incentives. On June 1, 2010, the Chinese government announced a trial program to provide incentives up to CN¥ 60,000 (~US$9,281 in June 2011) for private purchase of new battery electric vehicles and CN¥ 50,000 (~US$7,634 in June 2011) for plug-in hybrids in five cities. The cities participating in the pilot program are Shanghai, Shenzhen, Hangzhou, Hefei and Changchun. The subsidies are paid directly to automakers rather than consumers, but the government has stated that it expected that vehicle prices will be reduced accordingly. The amount of the subsidy is to be reduced once 50,000 units are sold. In addition to the subsidy, the Chinese government is planning to introduce, beginning on January 1, 2012, an exemption from annual taxes for pure electric, fuel-cell, and plug-in hybrid vehicles. Hybrid vehicles were eligible for a 50% reduction only.

A mid-September joint announcement in 2013 by the National Development and Reform Commission and finance, science, and industry ministries confirmed that the central government will provide a maximum of US$9,800 toward the purchase of an all-electric passenger vehicle and up to US$81,600 for an electric bus. The subsidies are part of the government's efforts to address China's problematic air pollution.

As a result of the government support and new incentives issued in 2014, production of new energy vehicles between January and August reached 31,137 units, up 328% from the same period of 2013. Domestic production during the first eight months of 2014 includes 6,621 plug-in hybrid sedans and 16,276 all-electric cars.

In February 2018, to further promote energy-efficient electric vehicles, China raised subsidies for electric vehicles meeting additional range requirements. Electric vehicle incentives for cars with at least 400 km of range increased from CN¥ 44,000 to CN¥ 50,000, while vehicles with less than 150 km of range have been removed from the list of vehicles qualifying for an incentive. Changes were also made to the incentive structure for electric buses and trucks. Buses are now required to have a range of at least 150 km and have energy consumption of less than 0.7 Wh/km·kg.

A 2021 study found that China's subsidies for fuel efficient vehicles was not welfare enhancing, as "the marginal cost of the program exceeds the marginal benefit by as much as 300 percent."

On May 21, 2022, Shanghai Municipal People's Government released and issued the "Shanghai Action Plan for Accelerating Economic Recovery and Revitalization" to promote automobile consumption. The incentive plan includes tax deduction and offers financial subsidy of CN¥ 10,000 per electrical vehicle.

Between 2009 and 2022, China spent 200 billion yuan (US$28 billion) on EV subsidies and tax breaks. China ended the max. 12,600 yuan direct subsidy for BEV customers in 2022. Until the end of 2025, tax exemption is a maximum of 30,000 yuan, reducing to a maximum of 15,000 yuan until the end of 2027.

=== India ===
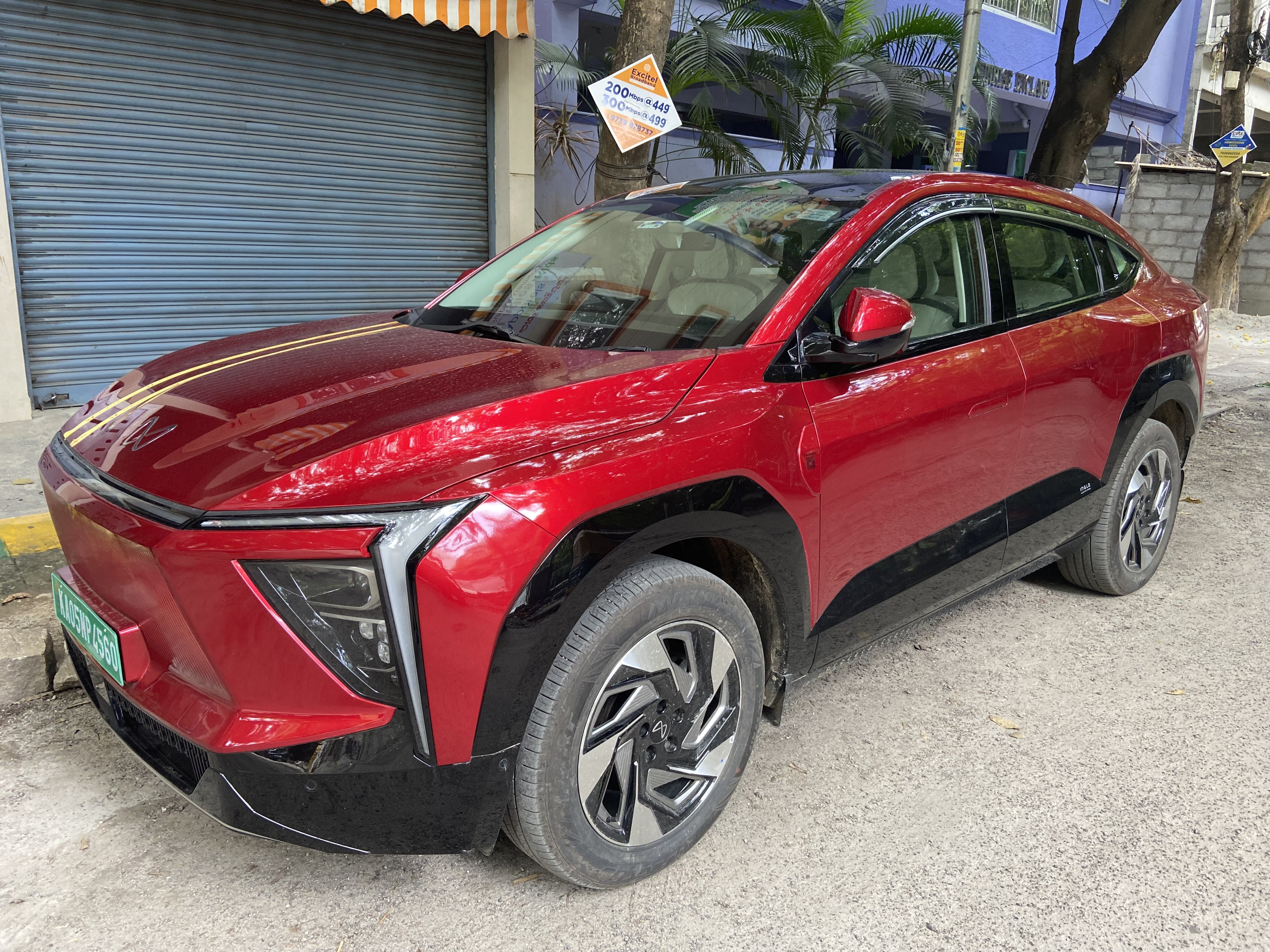
Mahindra XEV 9e

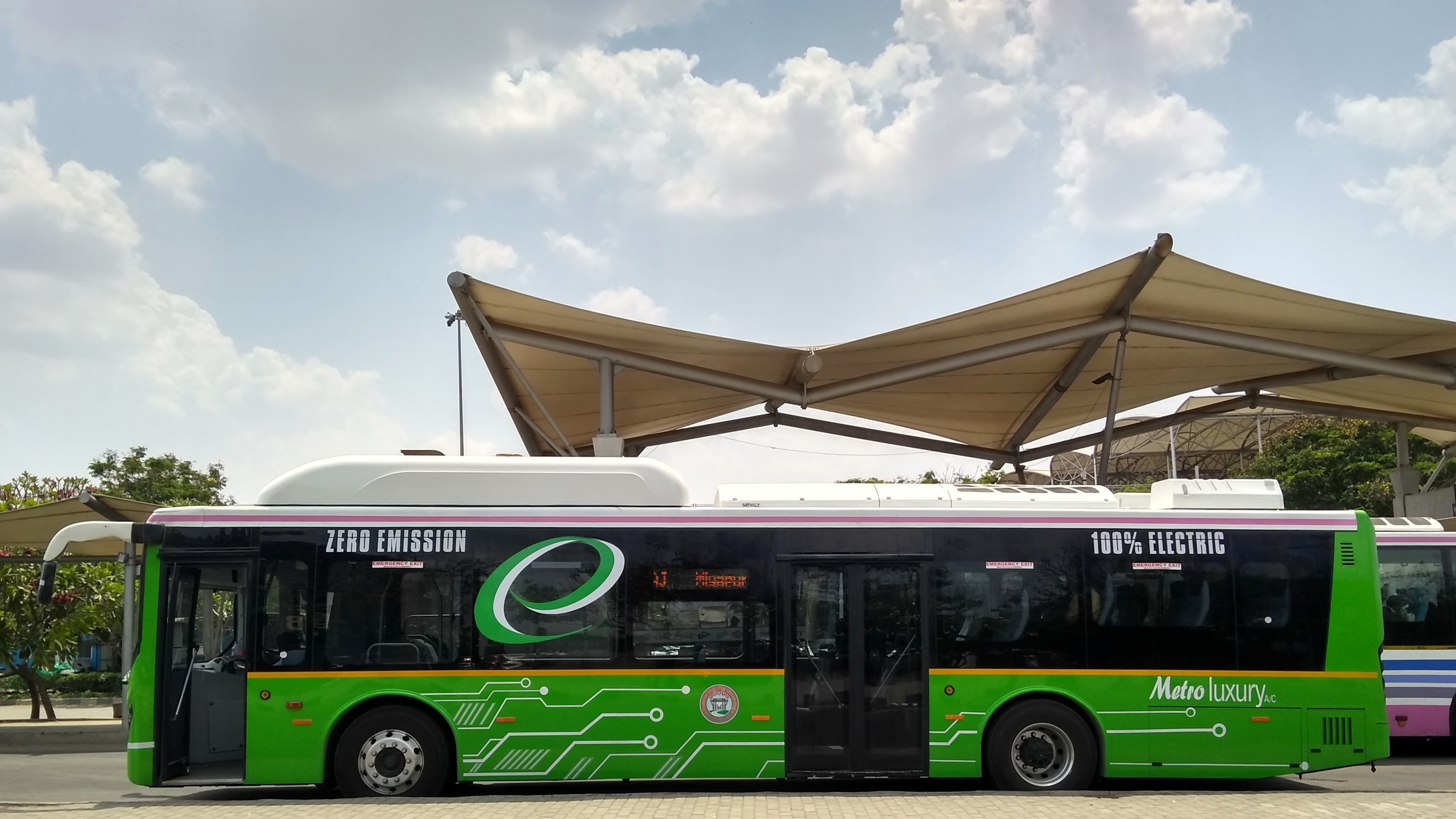
MEIL Olectra Greentech eBuzz K7 in Hyderabad

In November 2010, the Government of India (GoI), through the Ministry of New and Renewable Energy (MNRE), announced a subsidy of ₹950 million for electric vehicles. The subsidy provided benefits up to 20% on the ex-factory price, with a maximum benefit of ₹100,000 on electric cars, ₹4,000 on two-wheelers, ₹5,000 on high speed two-wheelers, ₹400,000 for electric minibuses, and ₹60,000 for three-wheelers. To claim the subsidy, manufacturers needed to certify that 30% of the components were made in India. The scheme ended on 31 March 2012.

In April 2014, the Indian government announced a new plan to provide subsidies for hybrid and electric vehicles. The plan will have subsidies up to ₹150,000 for cars and ₹30,000 on two-wheelers. India aims to have seven million electric vehicles on the road by 2020.

Various state governments and cities provide their own subsidies:

- Delhi, Rajasthan, Uttarakhand and Lakshadweep don't levy VAT
- Chandigarh, Madhya Pradesh, Kerala, Gujarat & West Bengal offer partial rebate on VAT
- Delhi also provides a 15% subsidy of the base price of select electric cars, like REVA. It also exempts such cars from road tax and registration fees.

To formalize the 2014 proposals, the government launched the Faster Adoption and Manufacturing of (Hybrid &) Electric Vehicles (FAME) Scheme Phase-I in April 2015. The program ran until March 2019, supporting approximately 280,000 vehicles with ₹359 crore in direct incentives. FAME Phase-II followed from April 2019 to March 2024 with a ₹11,500 crore budget, shifting policy focus toward public and shared transportation. It subsidized over 1.67 million electric vehicles and funded the deployment of 5,100 electric buses. During this period, the Goods and Services Tax (GST) on electric vehicles and charging stations was reduced to 5%, and the Ministry of Road Transport and Highways (MoRTH) exempted battery-operated vehicles from commercial permit requirements.

Following FAME-II, the PM E-DRIVE Scheme was introduced to sustain demand incentives, subsidizing the sale of over 2.65 million EVs by mid-2026. To build local supply chains, the government simultaneously implemented Production Linked Incentive (PLI) schemes for the Automobile and Auto Components sector, alongside Advanced Chemistry Cell (ACC) battery manufacturing. The Auto PLI scheme facilitated the domestic manufacturing of an additional 2.13 million EVs. Concurrently, the ACC PLI allocated 40 GWh of manufacturing capacity to domestic firms to decrease reliance on imported lithium-ion cells.

By 2026, a majority of state governments had implemented comprehensive electric vehicle policies, expanding beyond earlier partial rebates. States such as Maharashtra, Tamil Nadu, Uttar Pradesh, Haryana, Telangna began offering 100% exemptions on motor vehicle tax and registration fees, while also providing per-kWh demand incentives on top of federal subsidies. Supported by these combined measures, domestic market penetration accelerated. In the 2024–25 financial year, India recorded sales of over 2.03 million electric vehicles, representing a 7.8% market penetration rate across all vehicle categories. By the end of the 2025–26 financial year, overall EV market penetration reached 8.5%, with annual registrations exceeding 2.5 million units.

=== Japan ===
The Japanese government introduced the first electric vehicle incentive program in 1996, and it was integrated in 1998 with the Clean Energy Vehicles Introduction Project, which provided subsidies and tax discounts for the purchase of electric, natural gas, methanol and hybrid electric vehicles. The project provided a purchase subsidy of up to 50% the incremental costs of a clean energy vehicle as compared with the price of a conventional engine vehicle. This program was extended until 2003.

In May 2009 the National Diet passed the "Green Vehicle Purchasing Promotion Measure" that went into effect on June 19, 2009, but retroactive to April 10, 2009. The program established tax deductions and exemptions for environmentally friendly and fuel-efficient vehicles, according to a set of stipulated environmental performance criteria, and the requirements are applied equally to both foreign and domestic produced vehicles. The program provides purchasing subsidies for two type of cases, consumers purchasing a new passenger car without a trade-in (non-replacement program), and for those consumers buying a new car trading a used car registered for 13 years or more (scrappage program).

==== Tonnage and acquisition tax reductions ====
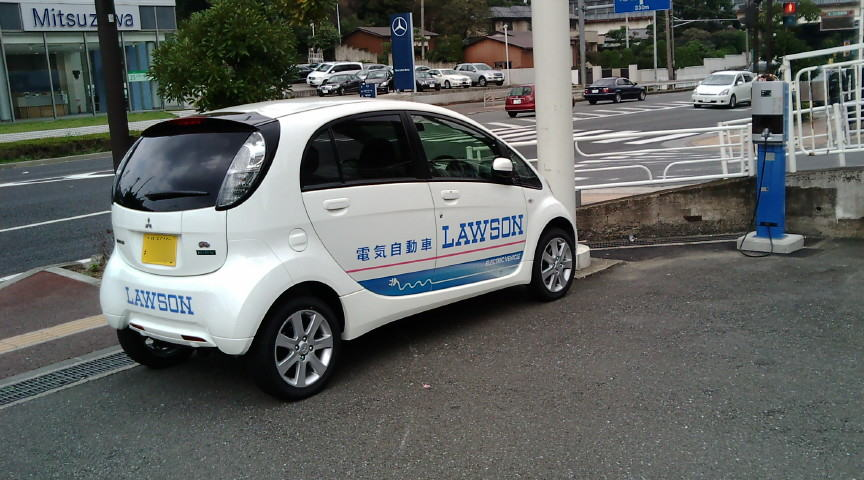
The cost of the Mitsubishi i MiEV in Japan falls from ¥4 million to ¥2.8 million after all government incentives are discounted from the sales price.

New next generation vehicles, including electric and fuel cell vehicles, plug-in hybrids, hybrid electric vehicles, clean diesel and natural gas vehicles are exempted from both the acquisition tax and the tonnage tax. Acquisition taxes on used vehicles were to be reduced by 1.6% to 2.7%, or between 150,000 yen (~US$1,600) and 300,000 yen (~US$3,200), as of 2010. Electric and fuel cell vehicles have a 2.7% reduction while plug-in hybrids have a 2.4% reduction.

These incentives were effective from April 1, 2009, until March 31, 2012, for the acquisition tax which is paid once at the time of purchase. The tonnage tax reductions were effective from April 1, 2009, until April 30, 2012, and the incentive was applicable once, at the time of the first mandatory inspection, three years after the vehicle purchase. As an example, the amount exempted for the purchase of a new next generation vehicle was 81,000 yen (~US$975) corresponding to the acquisition tax, and 22,500 yen (~US$271) for the tonnage tax, for a total of 103,500 yen (~US$1,246).

==== Automobile tax reductions ====
Consumers purchasing new next generation electric vehicles, including fuel cell vehicles, benefited from a 50% reduction of the annual automobile tax. These incentives were in effect from April 1, 2009, until March 31, 2010, applicable only once.

==== Incentives for purchasing new green vehicles ====
Subsidies for purchases of new environmentally friendly vehicles without scrapping a used car are 100,000 yen (~US$1,100) for the purchase of a standard or small car, and 50,000 yen (~US$550) for the purchase of a mini or kei vehicle. Subsidies for purchasing trucks and buses meeting the stipulated fuel efficiency and emission criteria vary between 200,000 yen (~US$2,100) and 900,000 yen (~US$9,600).

Subsidies for purchases of new environmentally friendly vehicles in the case of owners scrapping a 13-year or older vehicle are 250,000 yen (~US$2,700) for the purchase of a standard or small car, and 125,000 yen (~US$1,300) for the purchase of a mini or kei vehicle. Subsidies for purchasing trucks and buses meeting the stipulated fuel efficiency and emission criteria vary between 400,000 yen (~US$4,300) and 1,800,000 yen (~US$19,000).

All incentives for new purchases with or without trading were applicable in Japan's fiscal year 2009, from April 1, 2009, through March 31, 2010.

=== Philippines ===
Under President Rodrigo Duterte's administration, the Tax Reform for Acceleration and Inclusion Act was signed into law, which has exemptions for anyone buying an electric vehicle alongside hybrids. In 2024, EVs comprised 4% of total automobile sales, about 18, 690 EVs.

In 2026, funding is planned to continue for the Comprehensive Automotive Resurgence Strategy (CARS) indicating the governments continued support to increase the EV industry. The budget of the DTI and the Board of Investments will fund the CARS program.

=== South Korea ===
In July 2016, the Ministry of Trade, Industry and Energy announced a plan to make electric car batteries run longer, build a network of charging stations and make electric car purchases and ownership more affordable. The government expects that the policy programs will help increase the electric car market share in South Korea to 0.5% in 2017, up from 0.2% in 2015, and to achieve 5.3% in 2020.

The government subsidy has in place a one-time purchase subsidy for electric cars. Effective July 8, 2016, the subsidy was increased to 14 million won (US$12,100) from 12 million won (US$10,400). Also starting in 2016, the purchase tax surcharges of electric cars was planned to be reduced, and all-electric car drivers are projected to benefit from reductions in insurance premiums, expressway tolls and parking fees. The government plan calls for the deployment of fast charging stations in 2020 to be available at an average of one within a two-kilometer radius in the capital city of Seoul. In addition, 30,000 slow charging stations were planned to be strategically located at about 4,000 apartment complexes nationwide by 2020.

The government's plan also includes the development of an electric car battery, beginning in 2016, with energy density high enough to more than double the travel distance on a charge to 400 km (250 mi). The government expects to increase the global market share of South Korean electric cars to match that of South Korean gasoline and diesel cars, which reached 8.5% based on sales by South Korea's two main car exporters, Hyundai Motor Company and Kia Motors.

== Europe ==
Electrification of transport (electromobility) figures prominently in the Green Car Initiative (GCI), included in the European Economic Recovery Plan. DG TREN is supporting a large European "electromobility" project on EVs and related infrastructure with a total budget of around €50 million as part of the Green Car Initiative.

There are measures to promote efficient vehicles in the Directive 2009/33/EC of the European Parliament and of the Council of 23 April 2009 on the promotion of clean and energy-efficient road transport vehicles and in the Directive 2006/32/EC of the European Parliament and of the Council of 5 April 2006 on energy end-use efficiency and energy services.

As of April 2011, 15 of the 27 European Union member states provide tax incentives for electrically chargeable vehicles, which includes all Western European EU Member states, plus the Czech Republic and Romania. Also 17 countries levy carbon dioxide related taxes on passenger cars as a disincentive. The incentives consist of tax reductions and exemptions, as well as of bonus payments for buyers of PEVs, hybrid vehicles, and some alternative fuel vehicles.

=== Armenia ===
Armenia advanced an initiative to exempt VAT taxes from the import of electric cars. On January 17, the government approved the draft on the initiative on the draft law, according to which "the import of electric motor vehicles will be exempt from value added tax. The exemption is supposed to be in effect until January 1, 2022". The Value Added Tax (VAT) exemptions are extended through Dec. 31, 2026 as approved by the Economy Minister Gevorg Papoyan and covers electric buses, cars and motorcycles. However, the taxation rules disfavor EVs as property tax on cars is calculated by engine power which means that affordable EVs are taxed more heavily than gas-powered SUVs. The Finance Ministry is developing a more fair taxation code.

Armenia is also set to become the first country, the government of which will switch its fleet from petroleum-run cars to all electric cars. As the Minister of Nature Protection has stated, the Armenia has joined the Global Electric Mobility process. The country has already been granted relevant funds for undertaking this project, and as the minister states "in case of everything proceeding swiftly, all Cabinet members will be issued electric cars by year-end".

=== Austria ===
Electric vehicles are exempted from the fuel consumption tax, levied upon the first registration, and from the monthly vehicle tax. In addition to tax breaks, hybrid vehicles and other alternative fuel vehicles benefit from a fuel consumption tax that pays bonuses to passenger cars with low carbon dioxide output. Alternative fuel vehicles, including hybrids, qualify for as much as €800 (around US$1,120) in annual bonuses. This bonus was valid from 1 July 2008 until 31 August 2012. Additionally, cars with no carbon emissions qualify for a deduction of the VAT (Value-Added Tax), as of January 2016.

=== Belgium ===
The Belgian government established a personal income tax deduction of 30% of the purchase price including VAT of a new electric vehicle, up to €9,190. Plug-in hybrids are not eligible. This tax incentive ended on December 31, 2012. There is also available a tax deduction up to 40% for investments in external recharging stations publicly accessible, to a maximum of €250. The Wallonia regional government had an additional €4,500 eco-bonus for cars registered before December 31, 2011.

Legislation passed in December 2021 supported the purchase of EVs in company fleets through tax deductions for company cars. Battery electric vehicles and fuel-cell electric vehicles bought or leased until December 2026 will receive a 100% tax deduction; decreasing to a maximum of 67.5% by 2031. In contracts internal combustion vehicles and plug in hybrids will drop from a maximum of 100% to 0% by January 2028.

=== Bulgaria ===
Electric vehicles, including cars, motorbikes and mopeds, are exempt from the annual circulation tax.

=== Cyprus ===
Vehicles with emissions less than 120 grams of carbon dioxide per kilometer are exempt from paying registration taxes.

=== Czech Republic ===
Electric, hybrid and other alternative fuel vehicles used for business purposes are exempt from the road tax. The Czech Republic has one of the lowest rates of plug-in electric vehicles on newly registered automobiles among OECD countries (only 0.3% in 2018).

Hence, experimentally empirical research on Czech consumers’ preferences was conducted, whose aim was to evaluate the efficiency of various incentives that might promote the market with plug-in electric vehicles in the Czech Republic. The research has shown that except the price, the most relevant factors affecting the willingness to pay for the relatively expensive plug-in electric vehicles are: better fuel-efficiency (CZK 52,000 more on average for a reduction in operating costs of CZK 1 per 1 km for a new car), increase in driving range (CZK 28,000 more on average for an increase in driving range of 100 km), battery-charging time, financial support for electrical wiring in households, free parking in cities or environmental factors (26–40 thousand CZK for each 20% emission reduction). On the other hand, free motorway toll sticker or special traffic lane has non-significant effect on the incentives to buy the vehicle.

Starting from 18. 3. 2024, National Development Bank offers up to CZK 300 000 (~€11820 ) for buying new BEV or FCEV car for SME. Fund allocation currently for up to 7500 vehicles.

BEV, FCEV and Charging station incentives for SME
Type	Category	Minimum price	Maximum price	Incentive
Vehicle	M1	CZK 300 000	CZK 1 500 000	CZK 200 000
Vehicle	N1	CZK 300 000	CZK 2 000 000	CZK 250 000
Vehicle	N2 up to 4,25 t and FCEV	CZK 300 000	CZK 2 500 000	CZK 300 000
Charging station	AC		CZK 100 000	CZK 50 000
Charging station	DC up to 40 kW		CZK 250 000	CZK 100 000
Charging station	DC above 40 kW		CZK 400 000	CZK 150 000

=== Denmark ===
In 2016, battery electric vehicles lost access to their registration tax exemption. The registration tax will gradually be phased back in until 2020. As of 2016 there are only 7,000 electric cars in Denmark. As of late 2018 another push for delay of the gradually phasing beyond the initial 20% of the normal up 150% registration tax is expected to pass with a wide majority resulting to final phase being pushed to 2023: This also includes even larger base registration deduction of 40K DDK in 2019 while keeping the 20% and increasing deduction to ~77K DKK in 2020 together with first big substantial increase to 40% of normal registration tax. This was an agreed minimum deal of improvements most parties could get behind due to the symbolic meaning that cars under 400K DKK including VAT (which itself has deductions for efficient cars) would experience the old full registration tax exception matching 2019–2020 delivers of the cheaper but long range models such as Tesla Model 3 LR, LEAF 60 kWh model and Hyundai Kona Electric 60 kWh model. These models could be argued being the first non-premium cars useful for the people with the longest daily drives which makes the close to or financial positive compared to cheap compacts. Until 2019 only premium cars, under much fuss due to the large per car exemptions, or short-range users had a financial incentive alone to buy a full BEV instead of a mild Hybris. This 2018 push was after yet another round of discussions of even further incentives failed – a current split between moving too slowly and losing too much of the 57B DKK yearly income. 2018 law includes backstop moving from 5K to 10K cars sold since start of 2016 under this plan at which point incentives has to be revisited.

=== Estonia ===
No grants towards the purchase of Plug-In or Electric vehicles as of 2016. Electric vehicles are exempt from the city public parking fees and can use bus lanes.

From 2011 to 2014 Estonia has allocated a total of €9,000,000 in grants towards the purchase of battery electric vehicles (ended 7 August 2014). From 2011 to 2014, KredEx has allocated grants totaling €10,500,000; the average grant per car was €16,500. The grant has helped the purchase of over 650 electric cars in Estonia. At that time, a country-wide quick charging network (CHAdeMO 500 V/120 A and Type2 400 V/32 A) was established.

=== Finland ===
For the period of 2018–2021, €6,000,000 annually will be allocated towards the purchase of electric cars and conversion of petrol cars to E85 and gas. An individual registering a new electric car in the period 1.1.2018–30.11.2021 is eligible for a grant of €2,000, if the purchase price of the car is €50,000 or less.

The Prime Minister of Finland (2003–2010) Mr. Matti Vanhanen in 2010 mentioned that he wanted to see more electric cars on Finnish roads as soon as possible and with any cost to the governmental car related tax incomes. Incentives for public charging, particularly for high power and heavy duty vehicles were in force in 2024.

In the end of 2017, there were 1,449 electric cars registered in Finland. Half (49.6%) of newly registered cars in 2024 were plug in, with 29.5% fully electric and 20.1% plug in hybrids. 44% of purchase for corporate fleets were for EVs. In 2024, the representation of EVs passed 10% of the overall cars in Finland, which is approximately 291,000 EVs both electric and plug in hybrid.

=== France ===
Since 2008 France has a bonus–malus system offering a financial incentive, or bonus, for the purchase of cars with low carbon emissions, and a fee, or malus, for the purchase of high-emission vehicles. The bonus applies to private and company vehicles purchased on or after 5 December 2007 and are deduced from the purchase price of the vehicle. The malus penalty applies to all vehicles registered after 1 January 2008, and is added at the time of registration. Since 2009, every family with more than two children receives a deduction from the malus of 20 g of CO_{2} per km per child.

2012–2014

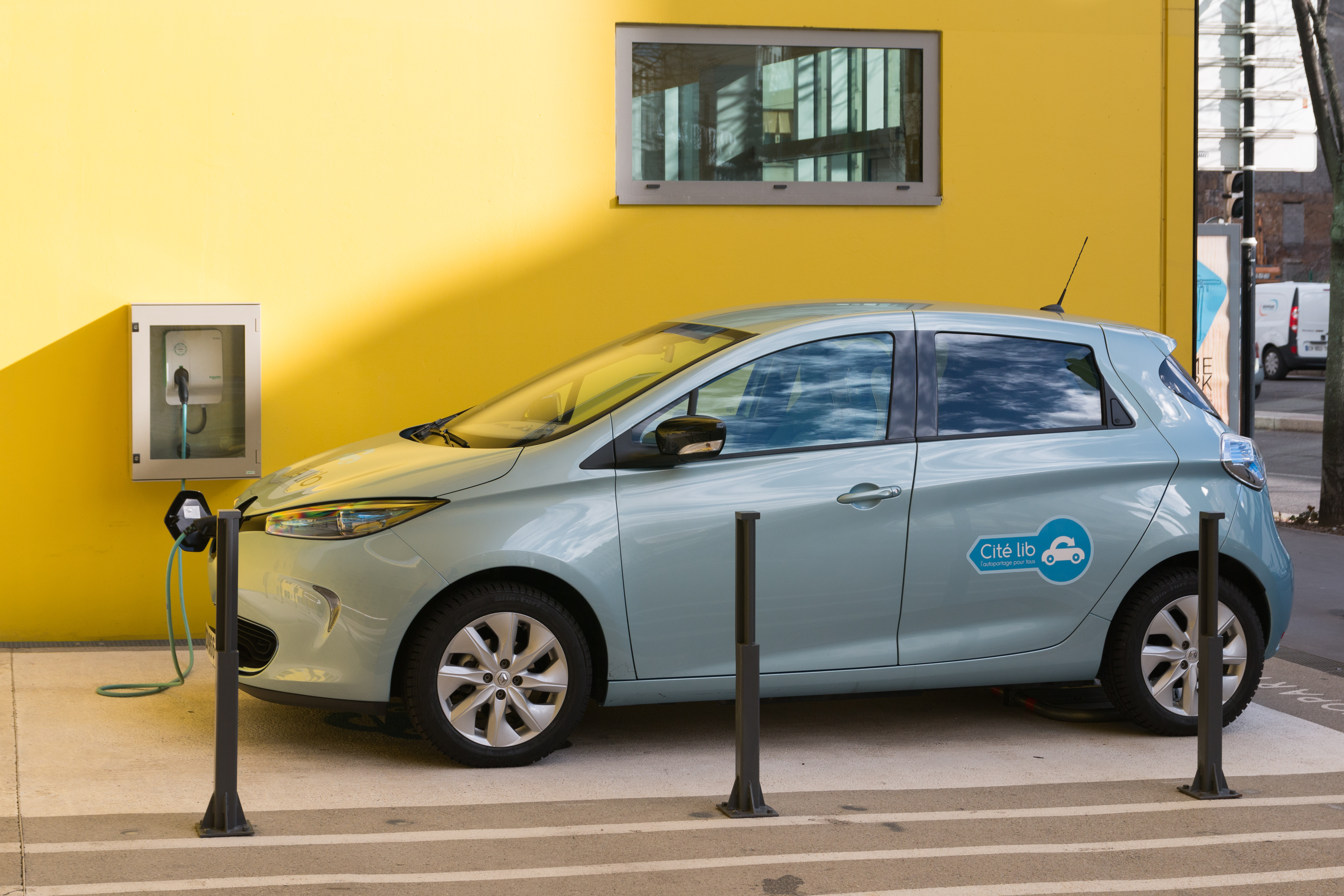
Electric cars purchased under a battery leasing contract, such as the Renault Zoe, are eligible for the full €6,300 bonus for zero CO_{2} emission vehicles.

Until July 31, 2012, a premium up to €5,000, under the bonus-malus system, was granted for the purchase of new cars with CO_{2} emissions of 60 g/km or less which benefited all-electric cars and any plug-in hybrid with such low emissions. Vehicles emitting up to 125 g/km or less, such as conventional hybrids and natural gas vehicles, were granted up to €2,000. The incentive could not exceed 20% of the sales price including VAT, increased with the cost of the battery if it is rented.

Effective on August 1, 2012, the government increased the bonus for electric cars up to €7,000 but capped at 30% of the vehicle price including VAT. The price includes any battery leasing charges, and therefore, electric cars which need a battery leasing contract also are eligible for the bonus. For example, an electric car sold for €23,333 including VAT was eligible for the maximum bonus of €7,000. The emission level for the maximum bonus was raised to 20 g/km or less. Cars with emission levels between 20 and 50 g/km were eligible to a bonus of up to €5,000, and between 50 and 60 g/km were eligible to a bonus of up to €4,500. After this limit, the bonus dropped to €550.

The fee schedule for the bonus-malus was modified in 2013. Effective November 1, 2013, the bonus was reduced from €7,000 to €6,300 for all-electrics and any other vehicle with CO_{2} emissions of less than 21 g/km. Vehicles emitting between 21 and 60 g/km, such as plug-in hybrids and conventional hybrids, were eligible to a bonus up to €4,000, and for emissions between 61 and 90 g/km up to €150, down from €550. Effective January 1, 2014, the fee schedule for the malus was increased to a maximum penalty of €8,000 from €6,000 for vehicles emitting over 200 g/km. Flex-fuel vehicles remained exempt from the malus fee. A neutral class applies to vehicles emitting between 91 and 130 g/km.

2015–2016

From April 1, 2015, a super-bonus was introduced, increasing the financial incentive to a cumulative total of €10,000, consisting of the regular bonus of €6,300 for purchasing a pure electric car, plus up to €3,700 for customers scrapping a diesel-powered car in circulation before 1 January 2001. In the case of plug-in hybrids with CO_{2} emission levels between 21 and 60 g/km, the purchase bonus was €4,000 plus the scrapping premium of €3,700. Also a specific €500 grant was introduced for families which are below the income tax threshold who buy an ordinary new or secondhand car below certain CO_{2} emission thresholds or a hybrid or electric car.

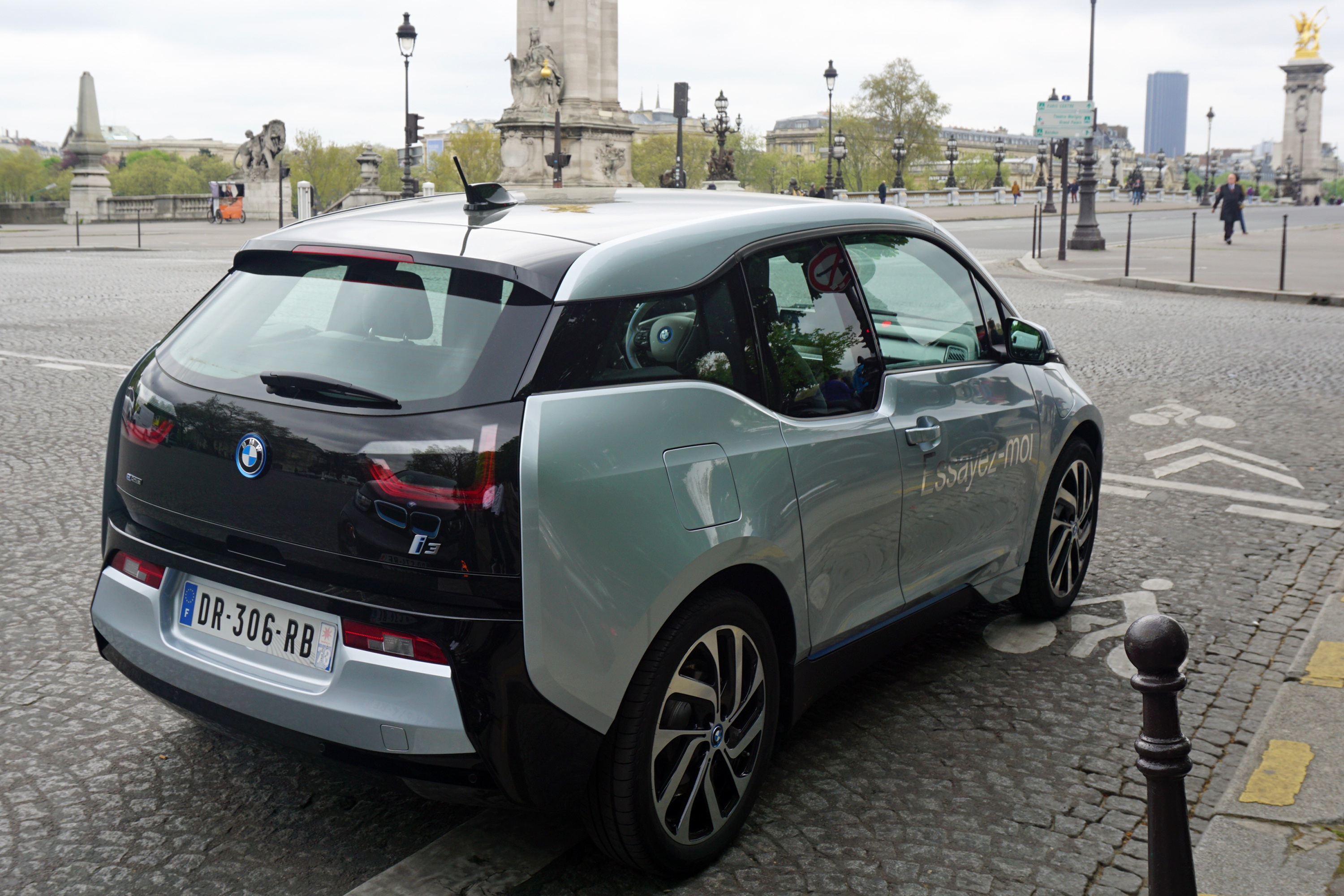
Electric cars equipped with a range extender, such as the BMW i3 REx, are entitled to the €6,300 bonus if emitting between 21 and 60 g/km of CO_{2}.

Effective January 4, 2016, the €6,300 bonus limited to 27% of the purchase price of vehicles emitting up to 20 g/km was kept. This bonus corresponds to pure electric vehicles and those equipped with a range extender. Vehicles emitting between 21 and 60 g/km are entitled to a €1,000 bonus. This bonus corresponds to the majority of plug-in hybrids. Conventional hybrid passenger cars emitting between 61 and 110 g/km with sufficient level of hybridization, with an electric motor with an output power of not be less than 10 kW, are entitle to a €750 bonus. Diesel-powered hybrids, such as the PSA Hybrid4, are no longer eligible for the bonus, even if the car emits less than 110 g/km of CO_{2}.

The combined €10,000 super-bonus for the purchase or lease of a new all-electric car was maintained. To be eligible for the additional scrappage bonus, the old diesel-powered car have to be owned for at least a year and in circulation before 1 January 2006. The new vehicle must not be sold within 6 months of acquisition or have traveled less than 6,000 km (3,700 mi).

The scrappage bonus for the purchase of an all-electric car was maintained at €3,700, while the bonus for plug-in hybrid car emitting between 21 and 60 g/km was set at €2,500. Only individuals or professionals are eligible for the scrappage bonus. Commercial vehicles are not eligible. Neither demonstration vehicles are eligible to the superbonus unless the vehicles are sold or leased within one year following the date of first registration. As of September 2016, the scrappage bonus of €3,700 for trading in old diesel-powered cars has been granted to more than 10,000 purchase transactions.

2017

As of September 2016, the government proposal to be in force from 1 January 2017 provides that the €10,000 super-bonus for scrapping a diesel vehicle over 10 years-old was planned to be renewed. However, the bonus for the purchase of a pure electric car was slated to drop to €6,000 from €6,300 in 2016, but to compensate, the additional scrappage bonus was to be increased to €4,000 from €3,700 in 2016. Also, the government plans to introduce a purchase price cap to the vehicles eligible for the bonus, and to introduce a new bonus for two-wheeled motor vehicles. For the more polluting vehicles, the government intends to increase the maximum malus fee to €10,000 from €8,000 in 2016 for vehicles emitting more than 191 g/km, lowering the limit from 200 g/km in 2016.

The government intended to maintain the €1,000 purchase bonus for plug-in hybrids with a CO_{2} emission level between 21 and 60 g/km. However, the proposal does not include anything about the conversion premium for scrapping a 10-year-old diesel car for the purchase of a plug-in hybrid. The purchase bonus for non-rechargeable hybrid vehicles was to be eliminated.

==== 2020–2022 ====
The French government has canceled any bonus for cars priced above €60,000, than for the car that bonus will be €6,000 in 2020 and €5,000 in 2021; and €4,000 in 2020 for the cars priced below €45,000 . For the car that cost between €45,000 and €60,000, the bonus is reduced by 50%, but French government will certainly adapt if too many people bought foreign cars. French (Zoe, E208, C4, DS-3...) EV will be on Fully supported, but other foreign car and specially Tesla is targeted by this limit of €45,000.

=== Germany ===
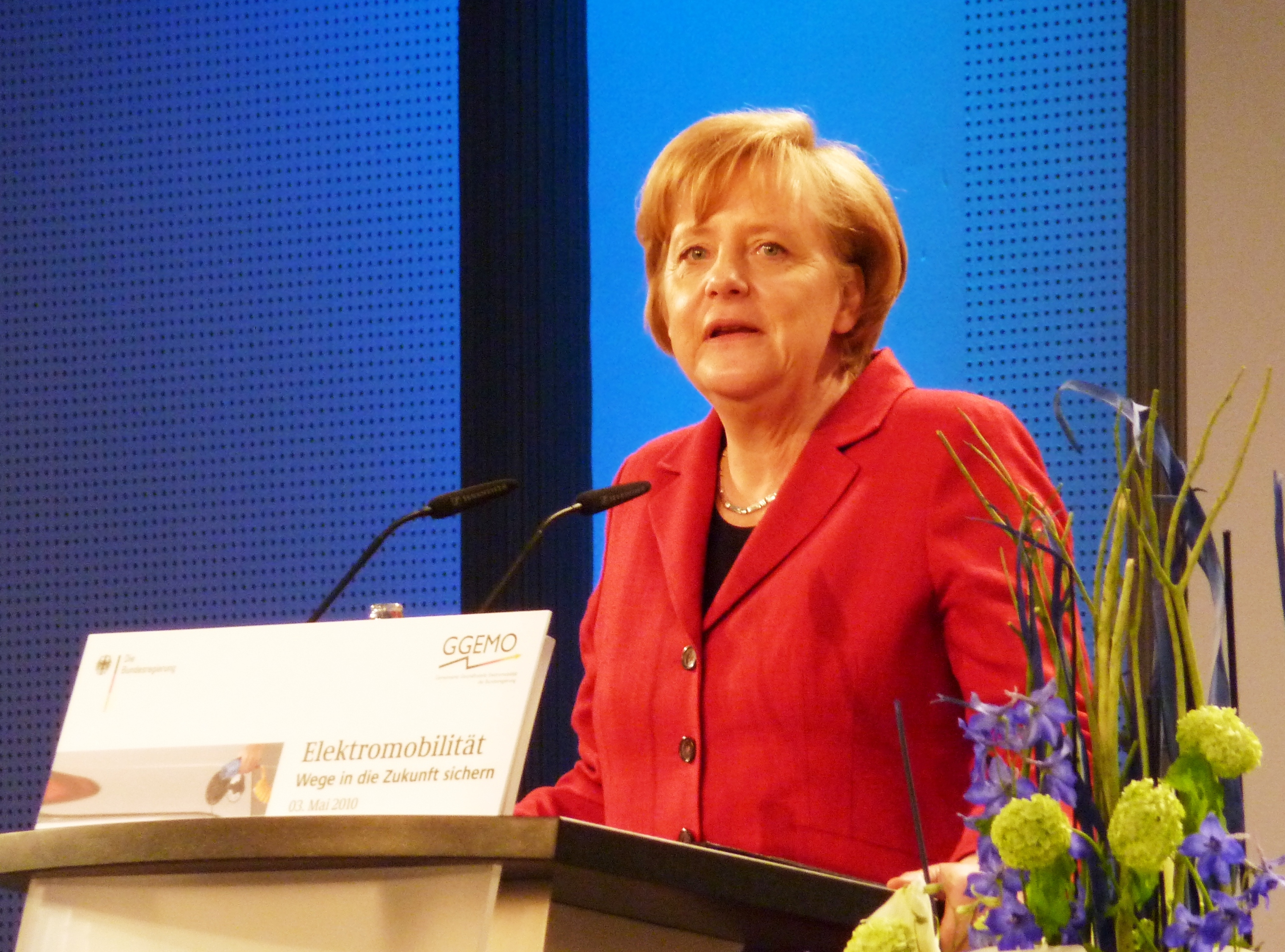
Chancellor Angela Merkel announced her goal to bring 1 million electric vehicles on German roads at the 2010 Electromobility Summit in Berlin.

"Nationale Plattform Elektromobilität" (NPE) is a German government initiative to develop Germany into a leading market for electric mobility. In May 2010, under its National Program for Electric Mobility, Chancellor Angela Merkel set the goal to bring 1 million electric vehicles on German roads by 2020. However, the government also announced that it would not provide subsidies to the sales of plug-in electric cars but instead it will only fund research in the area of electric mobility. Electric vehicles and plug-ins are exempt from the annual circulation tax for a period of five years from the date of their first registration. In 2016, the annual circulation tax exemption was extended from five to ten years, backdated to 1 January 2016.

The private use of a company car is treated as taxable income in Germany and measured at a flat monthly rate of 1% of the vehicle's gross list price. So plug-in electric cars have been at a disadvantage since their price tag can be as much as double that of a car using a conventional internal combustion engine due to the high cost of the battery. In June 2013 German legislators approved a law that ends the tax disadvantage for corporate plug-in electric cars. The law, backdated to 1 January 2013, allows private users to offset the list price with €500 per unit of battery size, expressed in kilowatt hours (kWh). The maximum offset was set at €10,000 corresponding to a 20 kWh battery. The amount one can offset will sink annually by €50 per kilowatt hour. The range criteria will rise to 40 km (25 mi) starting in 2018. As part of the package of financial incentives approved in 2016, private owners of plug-in electric vehicles that charge their cars in their employer premises are exempted from declaring this perk as a cash benefit in their income tax return. Employers who provide this perk are allowed to discount from their income tax a 25% of the lump sum value of the cash benefit. These two fiscal benefits apply only from 1 January 2017 until the end of 2020.

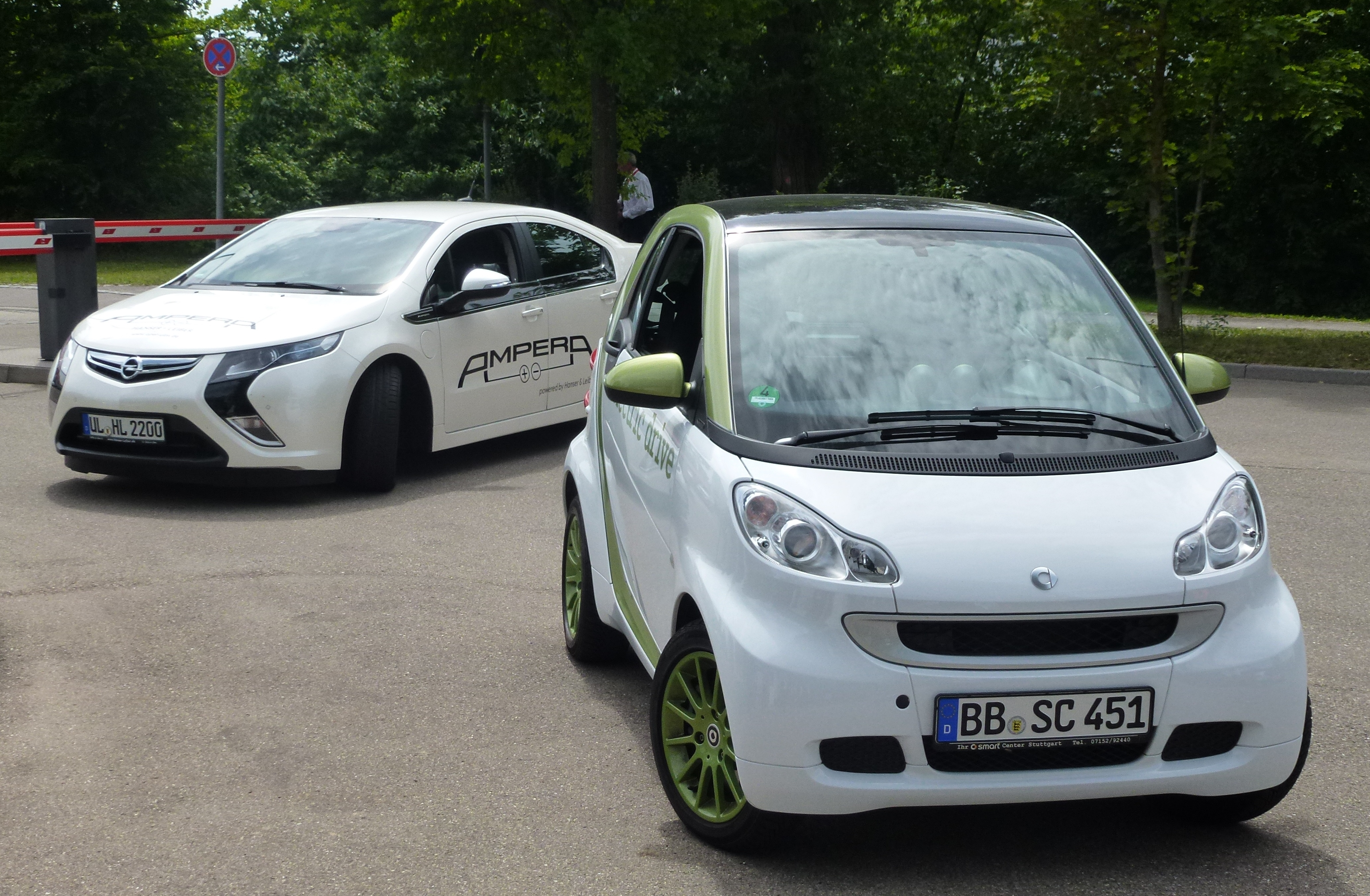
Smart ED all-electric car (right) and Opel Ampera plug-in hybrid (left) in Germany

In August 2014, the federal government announced its plan to introduce non-monetary incentives through new legislation to be effective by 1 February 2015. The proposed user benefits include measures to privilege battery-powered cars, fuel cell vehicles and some plug-in hybrids, just like Norway does, by granting local governments the authority to allow these vehicles into bus lanes, and to offer free parking and reserved parking spaces in locations with charging points. Not all plug-in hybrids will qualify for the benefits, only those with CO_{2} emissions of no more than 50 g/km or an all-electric range of over 30 km (19 mi) are eligible.

According to the fourth progress report of the German National Electric Mobility Platform, only about 24,000 plug-in electric cars are on German roads by the end of November 2014, well behind the target of 100,000 unit goal set for 2014. As a result, Chancellor Angela Merkel recognized in December 2014 that the government has to provide more incentives to meet the goal of having 1 million electric cars on the country's roads by 2020. Among others, and based on the recommendations of the report, the federal government is considering to offer a tax break for zero-emission company cars, more subsidies to expand charging infrastructure, particularly to deploy more public fast chargers, and more public funding for research and development of the next generation of rechargeable batteries.

In order to meet the climate targets for the transport sector, in 2016 the government set the goal to have from 7 to 10 million plug-in electric cars on the road by 2030, and 1 million charging points available in Germany also by 2030.

The abrupt termination of the environmental bonus on December 17, 2023, sparked considerable criticism, especially due to the lack of notice and the resulting uncertainties for consumers and the automotive industry.

Purchase incentive

==== 2016–2019 ====
At the beginning of 2016, German politicians from the three parties in Mrs. Merkel's ruling coalition and auto executives began talks to introduce a subsidy for green car buyers worth up to €5,000 (US$5,500) to boost sales of electric and plug-in hybrid cars. As of February 2016, the German government proposal is for the auto industry to cover 40% of the cost of the purchase subsidy. Private buyers would get the full €5,000 subsidy, while corporate buyers would receive €3,000 for each electric car, and the program is expected to run until 2020, the deadline set to achieve the goal of 1 million electric cars on German roads. Incentives will fall by €500 each year. In March 2016, Nissan Europe announced its support to the green car incentive and its commitment to double the government's E-premium incentive when buying a Nissan electric car, with a reduction of the purchase price of the same amount of the subsidy. Nissan Center Europe CEO said "we remain convinced that the goal of one million electric cars by 2020 is still achievable." According to Nissan if from now on electric car sales double every year until 2020, it is still possible to achieve the government goal.

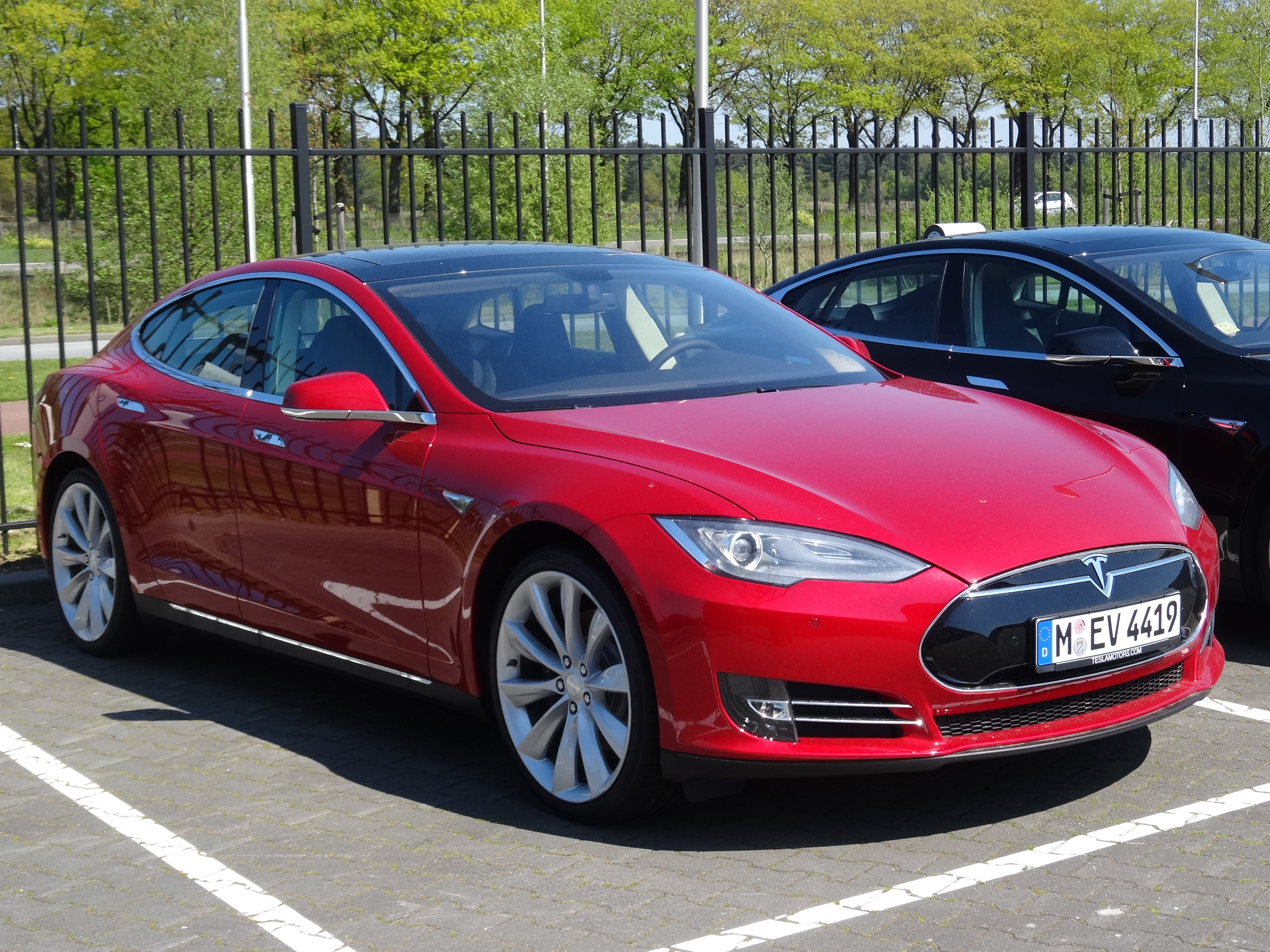
The Tesla Model S and other premium cars with a purchase price over €60,000 (US$67,800) are not eligible to the purchase bonus.

An incentive scheme to promote plug-in electric vehicle adoption was approved in April 2016 with a budget of €1 billion (US$1.13 billion). A total of €600 million (US$678 million) is reserved for the purchase subsidies, which are expected to run until all the money is disbursed, estimated to last until 2019 at the latest. Another €300 million (US$339 million) are budgeted to finance the deployment of charging stations in cities and on autobahn highway stops. And another €100 million (US$113 million) would go toward purchasing electric cars for federal government fleets. The program is aimed to promote the sale of 400,000 electric vehicles. The cost of the purchase incentive is shared equally between the government and automakers. Electric car buyers get a €4,000 (US$4,520) discount while buyers of plug-in hybrid vehicles get a discount of €3,000 (US$3,390). Premium cars, such as the Tesla Model S and BMW i8, are not eligible to the incentive because there is a cap of €60,000 (US$67,800) for the purchase price. Only electric vehicles purchased after 18 May 2016 are eligible for the bonus and the owner must keep the new electric car at least nine months. The same rule applies for leasing.

As of September 2016, BMW, Citroën, Daimler, Ford, Hyundai, Kia, Mitsubishi, Nissan, Peugeot, Renault, Toyota, Volkswagen, and Volvo had signed up to participate in the scheme. In May 2016, Nissan announced the company decided to raise the bonus with an additional €1,000 (US$1,130) to €5,000 (US$5,650) for customers of its all-electric Leaf car and e-NV200 utility van. The online application system to claim the bonus went into effect on 2 July 2016. As of September 2016, a total of 26 plug-in electric cars and vans are eligible for the purchase bonus. According to the Federal Office of Economics and Export Control (BAFA), a total of 4,451 applications have been made for the government subsidy for the purchase of a plug-in electric model as of 30 September 2016, consisting of 2,650 all-electrics and 1,801 plug-in hybrids. As of 30 September 2016, the federal states with the most claims are Bayern (1,130), Baden-Württemberg (873), and Nordrhein-Westfalen (726).

As of 1 September 2016, the following 26 plug-in electric cars and vans are eligible for the purchase bonus: Audi A3 e-tron, BMW 225xe, BMW 330e, BMW i3, Citroën Berlingo Electric, Citroën C-Zero, Ford Focus Electric, Kia Soul EV, Mercedes-Benz B-Class Electric Drive (B 250e), Mercedes-Benz C350 e, Mitsubishi i-MiEV, Mitsubishi Outlander P-HEV, Nissan e-NV200 5- and 7-seater Combi, Nissan Leaf, Peugeot iOn, Peugeot Partner Electric, Renault Kangoo Z.E., Renault Zoe, Smart Fortwo electric drive, Tesla Model 3, Toyota Prius Plug-in Hybrid, Volkswagen e-Golf, Volkswagen e-Up!, Volkswagen Golf GTE, Volkswagen Passat GTE, and Volvo V60 Plug-in Hybrid.

==== 2020–2021 ====
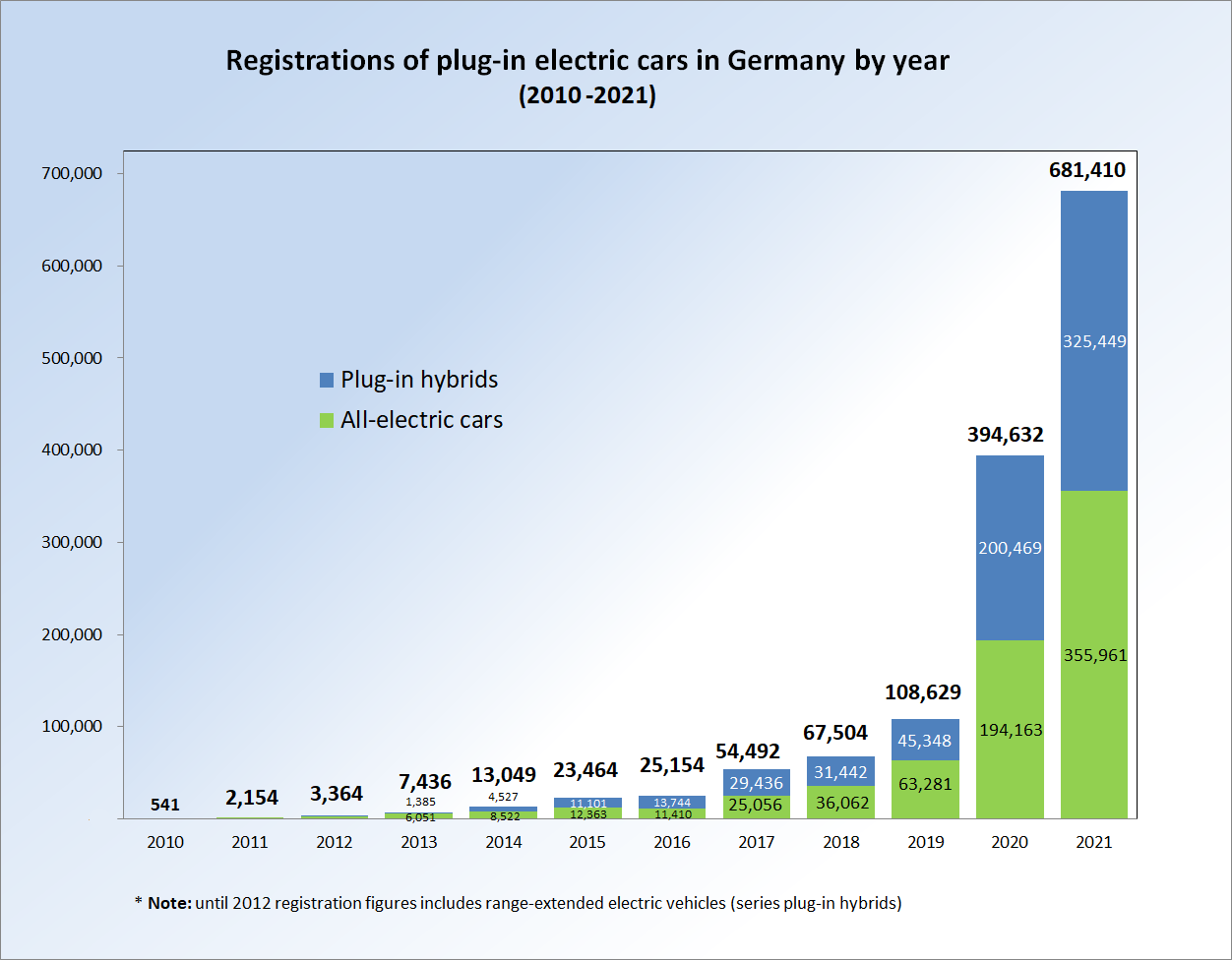
Annual registration of plug-in electric cars in Germany by type of powertrain between 2010 and 2021. The economic incentives issued in 2020 as part of the COVID-19 recovery plan increased plug-in car sales significantly in 2020 and 2021.

As a result of the economic impact of the COVID-19 pandemic, the government approved in June 2020 an economic recovery plan with a budget of €130 billion, which included €8 billion to promote electric vehicle adoption and deployment of charging infrastructure.

As part of the stimulus plan, the purchase bonus for plug-in electric cars was raised by temporarily doubling the federal contribution of the environmental bonus until the end of 2021. The so-called "innovation bonus" increased the subsidy for new cars costing less than €40,000 from €6,000 to €9,000 for fully electric cars, and for plug-in hybrids from €4,500 to €6,750. This became the highest economic incentive granted in any European country, but there is a holding period, the vehicle must be registered in Germany for at least six months.

There are also lower bonuses available for leasing; new cars costing between €40,000 and €65,000; and also for used cars, provided no environmental bonus was granted in a previous purchase. In addition, other tax incentives for electric vehicles were introduced. In November 2020 the government decided to keep the innovation bonus until the end of 2025, but for plug-in hybrid cars to be eligible they must have a minimum electric range of 60 km (37 mi) from 2022 and at least 80 km (50 mi) from 2025.

=== Greece ===
From 2011 to June 2016, all electric vehicles were exempt from the registration tax. From 1 July 2016 onwards the registration tax for hybrid vehicles was reduced to 50%.

In June 2020, Greek Prime Minister Kyriakos Mitsotakis announced the government's plan to support the adoption of new battery electric vehicles (BEV) and plug-in hybrid electric vehicles (PHEV) by individuals and corporations, with the aim for one-in-three new vehicles in Greece to be electric by 2030. The plan includes purchase subsidizing, exemption from the road tax and any parking fees, as well as incentives for setting up charging stations, for pure electric private passenger cars and motorbikes, as well as for pure electric or plug-in hybrid taxis and light commercial vehicles. The government's subsidy covers the purchase of new BEVs and PHEVs with a total of 100 million euros for 18 months in the first phase, which is estimated to cover 25% of the cost of about 14.000 new electric vehicles.

The government will subsidize the purchase of each new electric vehicle, covering 15% of its cost (up to €5.500) for private passenger and light commercial vehicles, 20% of the cost (up to €800) for motorbikes and 25% of the cost (up to €8.000) for taxis. Vehicle owners that will concurrently retire their old vehicle will receive an additional bonus of up to €2.500. Furthermore, expenses for charging the electric car will be exempt from taxable income. The benefit for each new electric car, if combined with the ecological bonus and the relevant tax exemptions, will approach 10.000 euros.

=== Hungary ===
All hybrid and electric vehicles are exempt from registration tax. The Government announced that from October 27, 2016, electric vehicles would be eligible for a 21% rebate of the gross purchase price, capped at a 1,500,000 Ft (€4,800 at the December 2016 exchange rate). Furthermore, to promote electric cars, the Government has added some other regulatory incentives, such as green license plates, and simplified tax and regulations on electric charge points. By 2020, the Government expects that there will be 30,000 environmentally friendly cars on Hungarian roads.

=== Iceland ===
All electric vehicles are exempt from VAT up to 6,000,000 kr, and the tax is applied at the normal rate for the remainder of the price. Electric vehicles, as well as hydrogen powered vehicles, that are shorter than 5 meters also get free parking in the city center for up to 90 minutes. The free parking also applies to methane and hybrid vehicles that weigh less than 1,600 kg, although in order for hybrid vehicles to be applicable, they must have CO_{2} emissions of less than 50 g/km.

=== Ireland ===
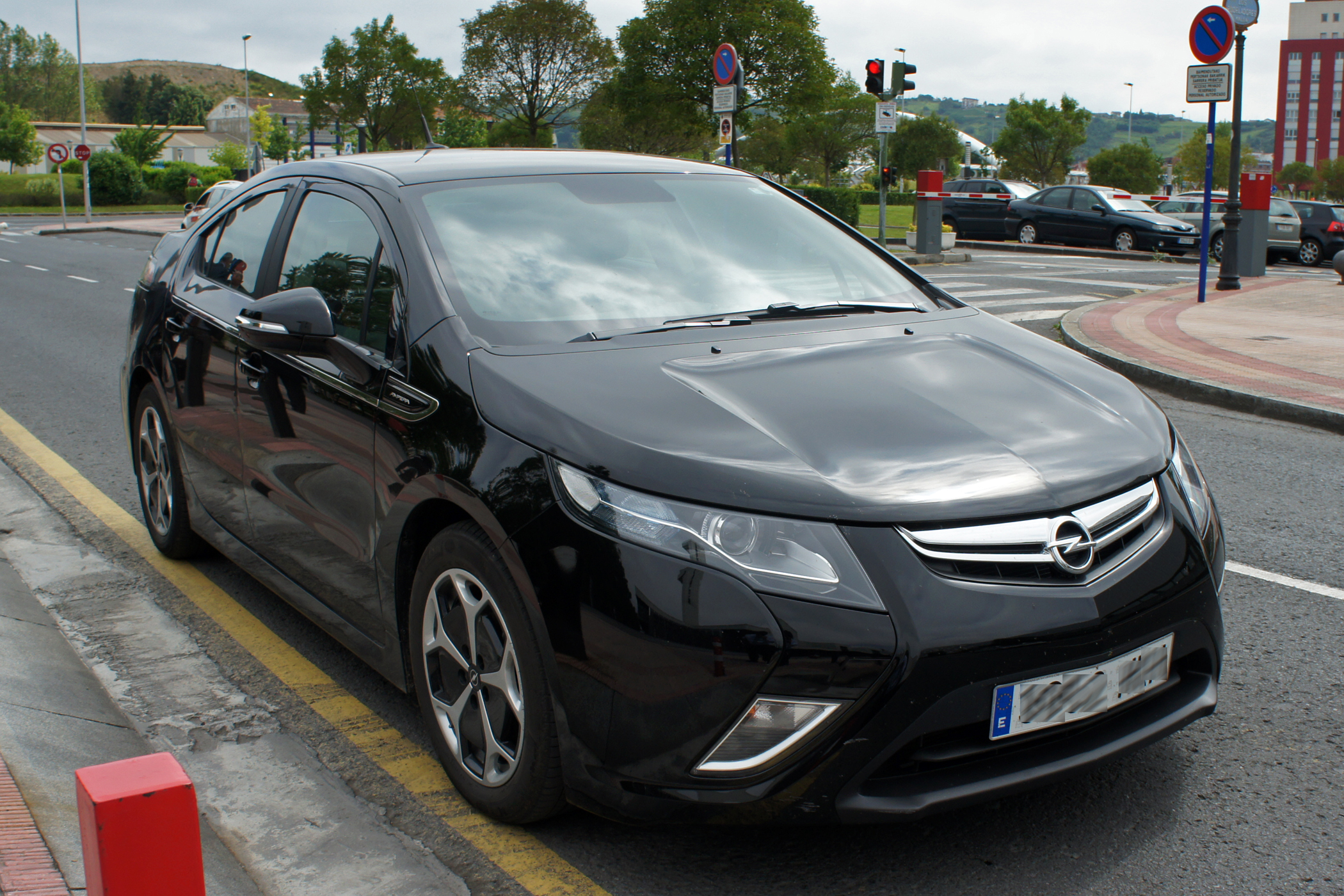
The Opel Ampera plug-in hybrid is available in several European countries.

Series production EVs were exempted from VRT until December 2012. The VRT exemption was replaced by a €5000 credit against the tax. Annual motor tax for EVs is €120. The Government has set a target of 10% for all vehicles on Irish roads to be electric by 2020.

The ESB eCar electric vehicle charging network serves as the main charging network for the island of Ireland and has rapidly expanded in recent years. Currently the network is free to use with an RFID card provided by ESB to EV owners who wish to use the network. The network aims to provide rapid charging every 30 km on major routes and as of 2015 has almost 2000 standard charging points (all provide connection via IEC 62196 Type 2 Mennekes, around half are 22 kW with the remainder a mix of 3.6 kW and 7.4 kW). There are around 100 CHAdeMO rapid chargers with over 70 located outside the Dublin Metro area. All rapid chargers installed since mid-2014 have been triple standard CHAdeMO/Combined Charging System/AC 43 kW. Four rapid chargers in Dublin and two rapid chargers in Belfast were co-funded by the EU as part of the UK/Ireland RCN program. The UK charging network operated by Ecotricity has a single CHAdeMO only rapid charger at IKEA Belfast. This is the sole rapid charger on the island that is not part of the ESB eCars network.

Sustainable Energy Authority of Ireland offers a government grant of up to €5,000 for the purchase of a new electric car. Electric and hybrid vehicles had a reduction of up to €2,500 off the registration tax between July 2008 and December 2010. However this grant is only available on vehicles on an approved list of models which must be sold by a dealer registered for the scheme. No grant applies where a vehicle is imported privately. The grant is reduced to €3,800 for business purchasers or those who require finance to purchase the vehicle, however some importers will report financed private sales as cash sales to acquire the full grant.

As of September 2014, plug-in electric car purchasers are eligible for a government credit worth up to €5,000 (about US$6,500). Vehicle Registration Tax (VRT), up to €5,000 is also waived for electric cars. Also, all-electric car owners pay the lowest rate of annual road tax, which is based on emissions. In addition, the first 2,000 electric cars registered in Ireland are eligible for installation of a free home-charging points worth about €1,000 (about US$1,300).

=== Italy ===
Electric vehicles are exempt from the annual circulation tax or ownership tax for five years from the date of their first registration. Thereafter, EVs benefit from a 75% reduction of the tax rate applied to equivalent gasoline-powered vehicles. Buyers of electric vehicles and other vehicles emitting 70 g/km or less of carbon dioxide are eligible to receive from €1,500 to €6,000. In the region of Lombardy, electric vehicles are exempt from the annual ownership tax.

In August 2025, the Italian Ministry of the Environment and Energy Security passed an incentive to promote purchase of battery-EVs. The target of the plan is to replace approximately 39,000 combustion engine vehicles with EVs. Individuals may get up to €11,000 for the purchase of a new BEV. Small business may receive up to 30% of the purchase price of a light-commercial vehicle. This incentive is to enhance Italy's purchases BEV of only 6% of new cars sales when compared to more than 15% across the EU.

=== Latvia ===
Electric vehicles, including cars, goods vehicles, buses, and motorcycles, are exempt from payment of the Vehicle Operation Tax.

=== Luxembourg ===
Buyers of electric vehicles and other vehicles emitting 60 g/km or less of carbon dioxide are eligible to receive a premium of €3,000 (around US$4,200), this premium ended 31 December 2011. In order to qualify for the rebate, the owner must have concluded an agreement to buy electricity from renewable energy.

=== Monaco ===
Buyers of electric vehicles and plug in hybrids are eligible to receive €9,000 (around US$12,600) from the Monegasque Government. In addition vehicles owners are allowed to park free at any public parking facility. The Monaco government program subsidizes up to 30% of the purchase price of battery-EVs. On September 1, 2025, Monaco revised their automotive registration process and stickers and maintained that registration for EVs was free.

=== Netherlands ===
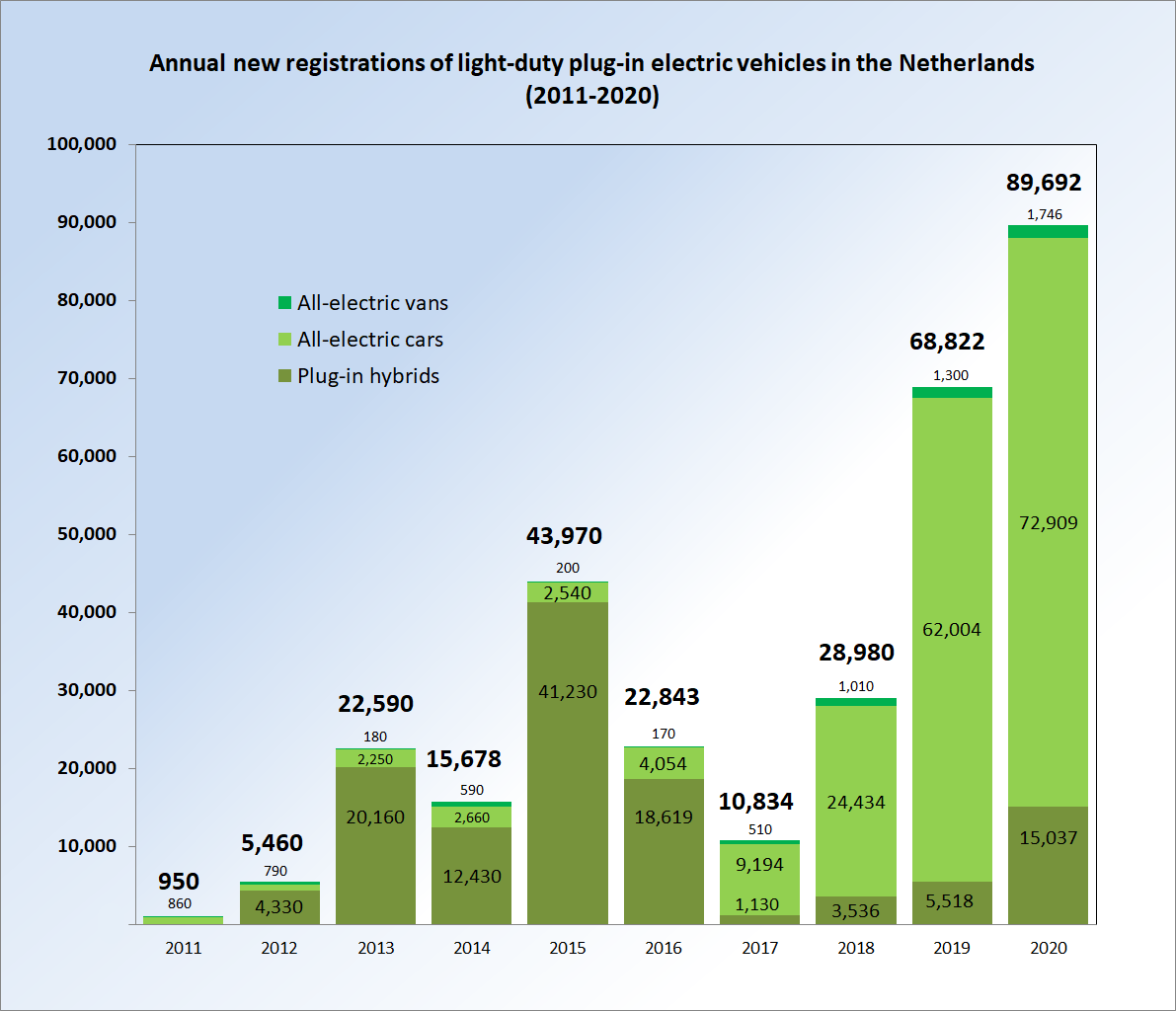
Annual sales of light-duty plug-in electric vehicles in the Netherlands by year between 2011 and 2020. The strong fluctuation in annual registrations is the result of frequent changes in purchase and tax incentives.

Considering the potential of plug-in electric vehicles in the country due to its relative small size and geography, the Dutch government set a target of 15,000 to 20,000 electric vehicles with three or more wheels on the roads in 2015; 200,000 vehicles in 2020; and 1 million vehicles in 2025. The first government target was achieved in 2013, two years earlier, thanks to the sales peak that occurred at the end of 2013. According to official figures, 30,086 plug-in electric vehicles with three or more wheels have been registered in the country through 31 December 2013.

Initially, the Dutch government set incentives such as the total exemption of the registration fee and road taxes, which resulted in savings of approximately €5,324 for private car owners over four years, and €19,000 for corporate owners over five years. Other vehicles including hybrid electric vehicles were also exempt from these taxes if they emit less than 95 g/km for diesel-powered vehicles, or less than 110 g/km for gasoline-powered vehicles. The exemption from the registration tax ended on January 1, 2014, and thereafter, all-electric vehicles pay a 4% registration fee and plug-in hybrids a 7% fee.

In addition, the national government offers through the Ministry of Infrastructure and the Environment a €3,000 subsidy on the purchase of all-electric taxis or delivery vans. This subsidy increases to €5,000 per vehicle in Amsterdam, Rotterdam, The Hague, Utrecht, and Arnhem-Nijmegen metropolitan area. An additional subsidy is offered by several local government for the purchase of full electric taxis and vans, €5,000 in Amsterdam and €3,000 in Limburg and Tilburg.

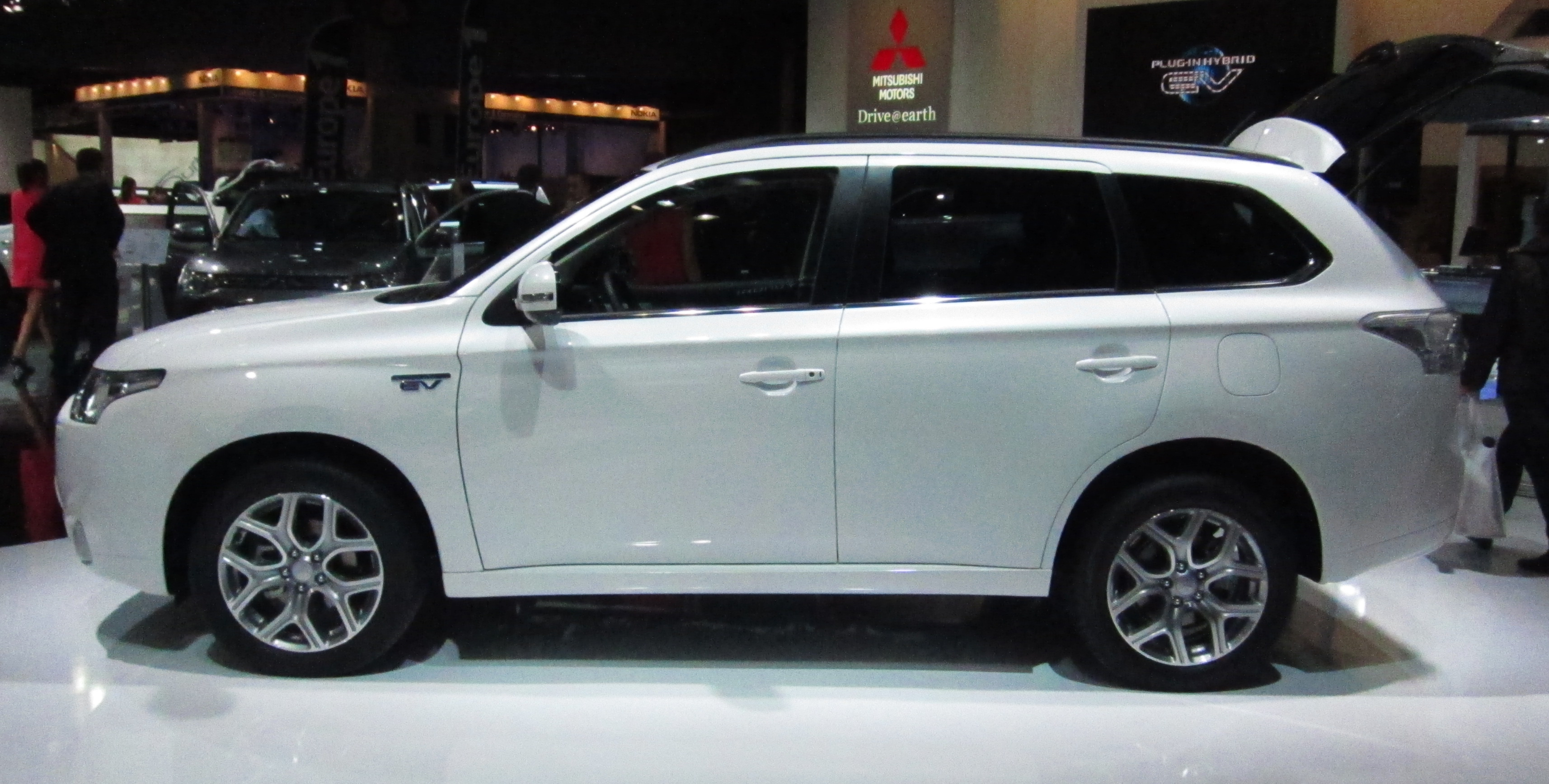
Launched in the Dutch market in 2013, the Mitsubishi Outlander P-HEV is the country's top selling ever plug-in hybrid electric vehicle.

In Amsterdam EV owners also have access to parking spaces reserved for battery electric vehicles, so they avoid the current wait for a parking place in Amsterdam, which can reach up to 10 years in some parts of the city. Free charging is also offered in public parking spaces. EV owners in the city of Rotterdam are entitled to one year of free parking in downtown and enjoy subsidies of up to €1,450 if they install a home charger using green electricity. The city also introduced in 2014 a scrappage program to remove old polluting vehicles to improve air quality in the city. Rotterdam offers a €2,500 incentive for business buyers to replace the old vehicles with all-electric vehicles. The subsidy is only available to the first 5,000 applicants that buy an eligible vehicle before the end of December 2013. Other factors contributing to the rapid adoption of plug-in electric vehicles are the relative small size of the country, which reduces range anxiety (the Netherlands stretches about 100 mi (160 km) east to west); a long tradition of environmental activism; high gasoline prices (US$8.50 per gallon as of January 2013), which make the cost of running a car on electricity five times cheaper; and also some EV leasing programs provide free or discounted gasoline-powered vehicles for those who want to take a vacation driving long distances. With all of these incentives and tax breaks, plug-in electric cars have similar driving costs to conventional cars.

Initially, sales of plug-in electric car were lower than expected, and during 2012 the segment captured a market share of less than 1% of new car sales in the country. As a result of the end of the total exemption of the registration fee, the segment sales peaked at the end of 2013, and plug-in electric car sales reached a market share of 5.34% of new car sales in 2013. The total cost of the tax exemptions for the Dutch treasury of the more than 22,000 plug-in electric vehicles sold in 2013 was estimated at €500 million (US$691 million).

=== Norway ===
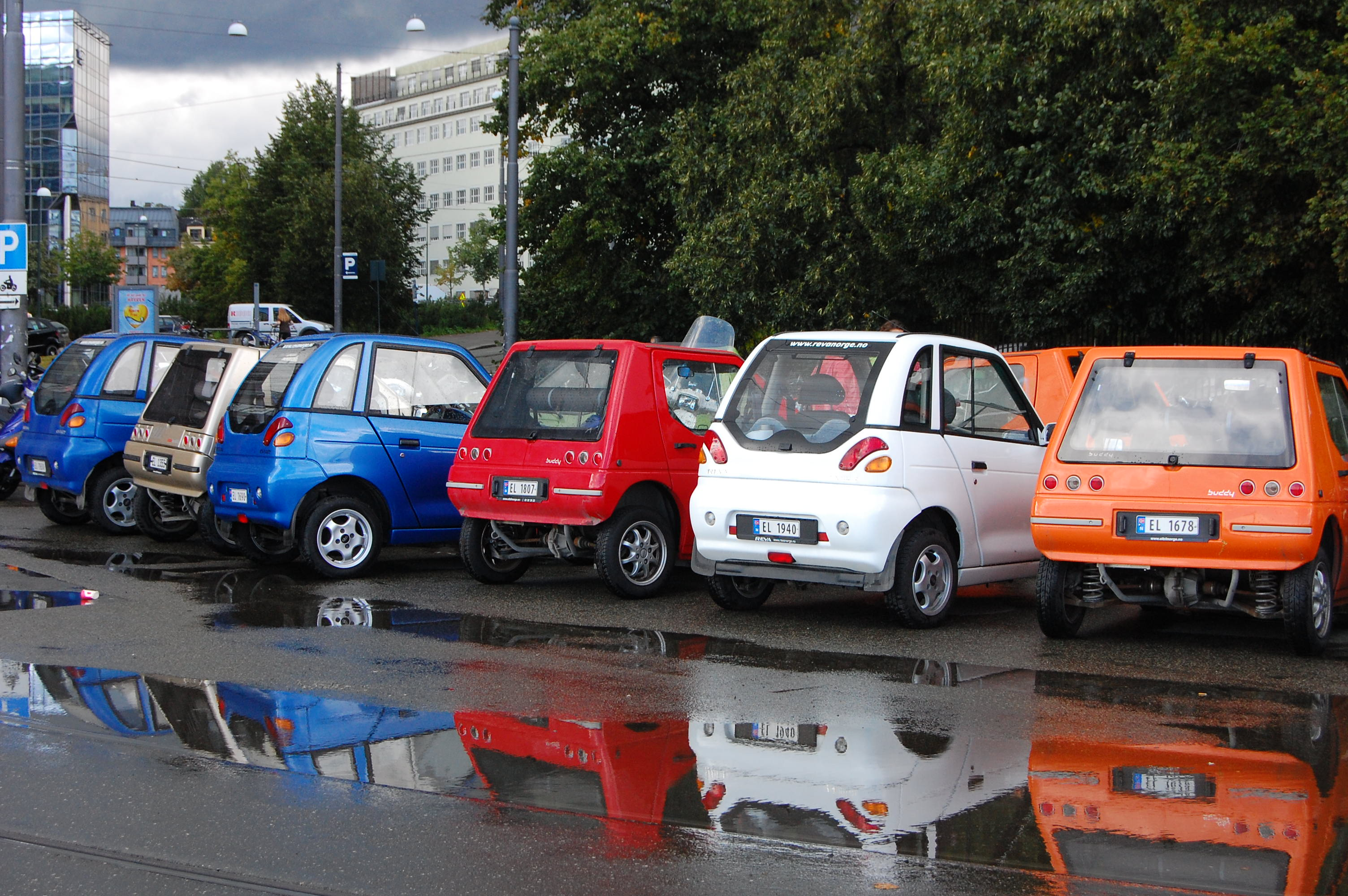
The Buddy and REVAi were among the top selling electric cars in Norway until 2010. Shown a free parking lot for EVs with charging stations.

The Parliament of Norway set the goal to reach 50,000 zero emission vehicles by 2018. Among the existing incentives, all-electric cars are exempt in Norway from all non-recurring vehicle fees, including purchase taxes, which are extremely high for ordinary cars, and 25% VAT on purchase, together making electric car purchase price competitive with conventional cars. As an example, by early 2013 the price of the top selling Nissan Leaf was 240,690 kroner (around US$42,500) while the purchase price of the 1.3-lt Volkswagen Golf was 238,000 Krone (about US$42,000). Electric vehicles are also exempt from the annual road tax, all public parking fees, and toll payments, as well as being able to use bus lanes.

Government officials reserved in 1999 the "EL" prefix for exclusive use of all-electric vehicles in order to be able to enforce on the road the benefits available to EVs. As the "EL" series is set to end at "EL 99999" (most vehicles in the country have five-digit registration numbers between 10000 and 99999), the Norwegian Public Roads agency opted for the prefix "EK" in the second series of plates, to signify "elektrisk kjøretøy", Norwegian for electric vehicle. And because the sale of electric vehicles is expected to continue at a rapid pace, meaning that the second phase of license plates is likely to run out as well, the "EV" prefix has been set aside for future electric cars. In July 2016, as the stock of "EL" prefix plates was almost depleted, the first electric vehicles registered with the new "EK" series were on the road.

Until June 2013, plug-in hybrids were not eligible for these benefits. Because the Norwegian tax system levies higher taxes for heavier vehicles, plug-in hybrids were more expensive than similar conventional cars due to the extra weight of the battery pack and its additional electric components. Beginning on 1 July 2013, the existing weight allowance for conventional hybrids and plug-in hybrids of 10% was increased to 15% for PHEVs.

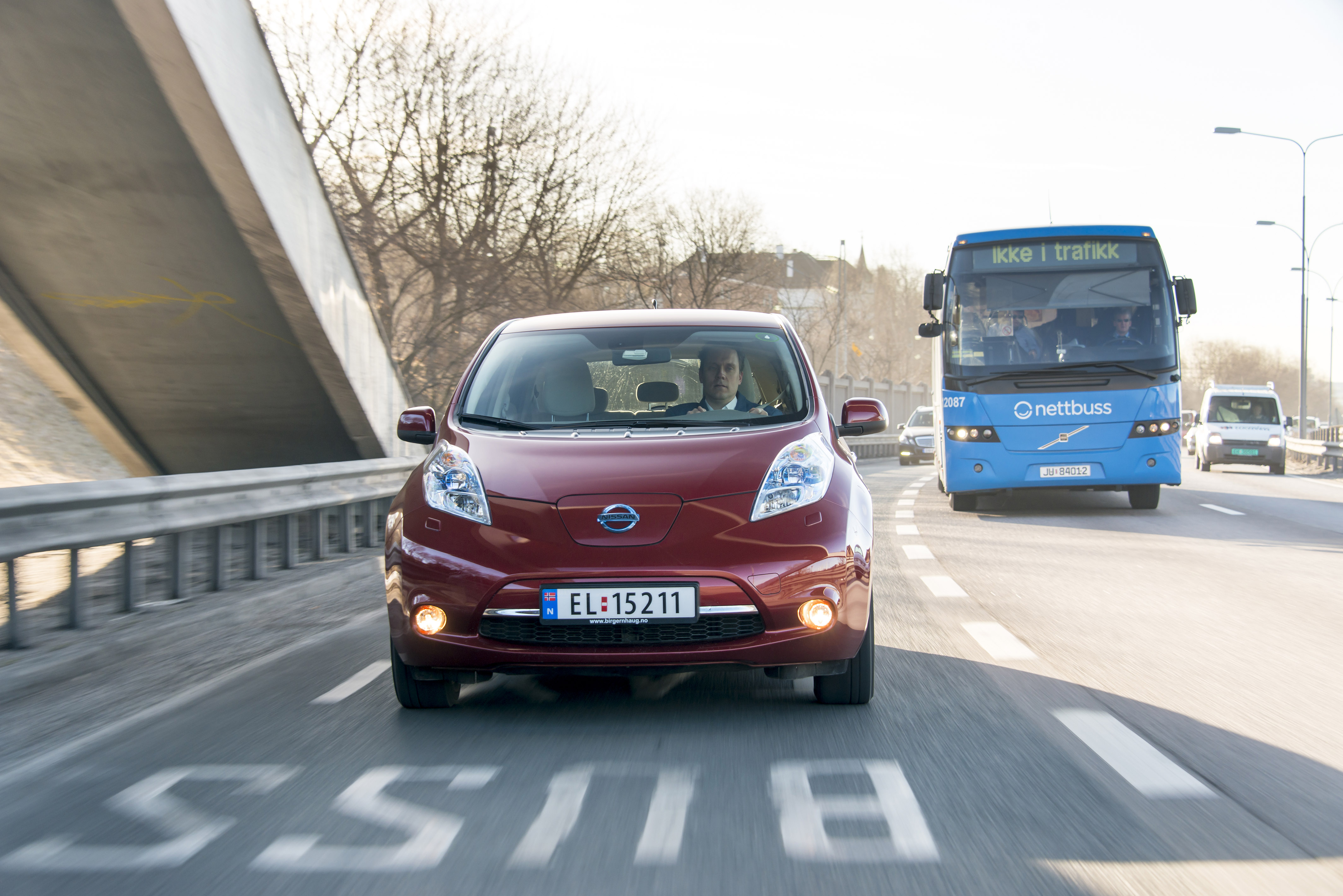
Electric cars have access to bus lanes in Norway. Shown a Nissan Leaf, the top selling plug-in electric car in the country since 2012.

In September 2013 the Norwegian Parliament approved, as part of the revised 2014 budget, an exemption from the 25% VAT for leasing electric vehicles effective on 1 January 2014. However, as of September 2014, the exemption has not gone into effect because the Minister of Finance decided to defer the measure, pending a formal consultation with the EFTA Surveillance Authority (ESA) to ensure that the VAT exemption for leasing was not in violation of the European Economic Area Agreement. The government's loss of revenue due to the still not implemented leasing exemption is estimated at 47 million krone (around US$7.3 million) per year. One Member of Parliament has criticized the government for the delay. He had argued that the initial VAT exemption for all electric vehicles was never approved in ESA. In addition, an ESA spokesman confirmed that the Government has not sent any request as of September 2014, nor has ESA received any complaints about Norway's original EV tax exemption. The MP said he will demand that the decision be implemented when Parliament meets in October 2014.

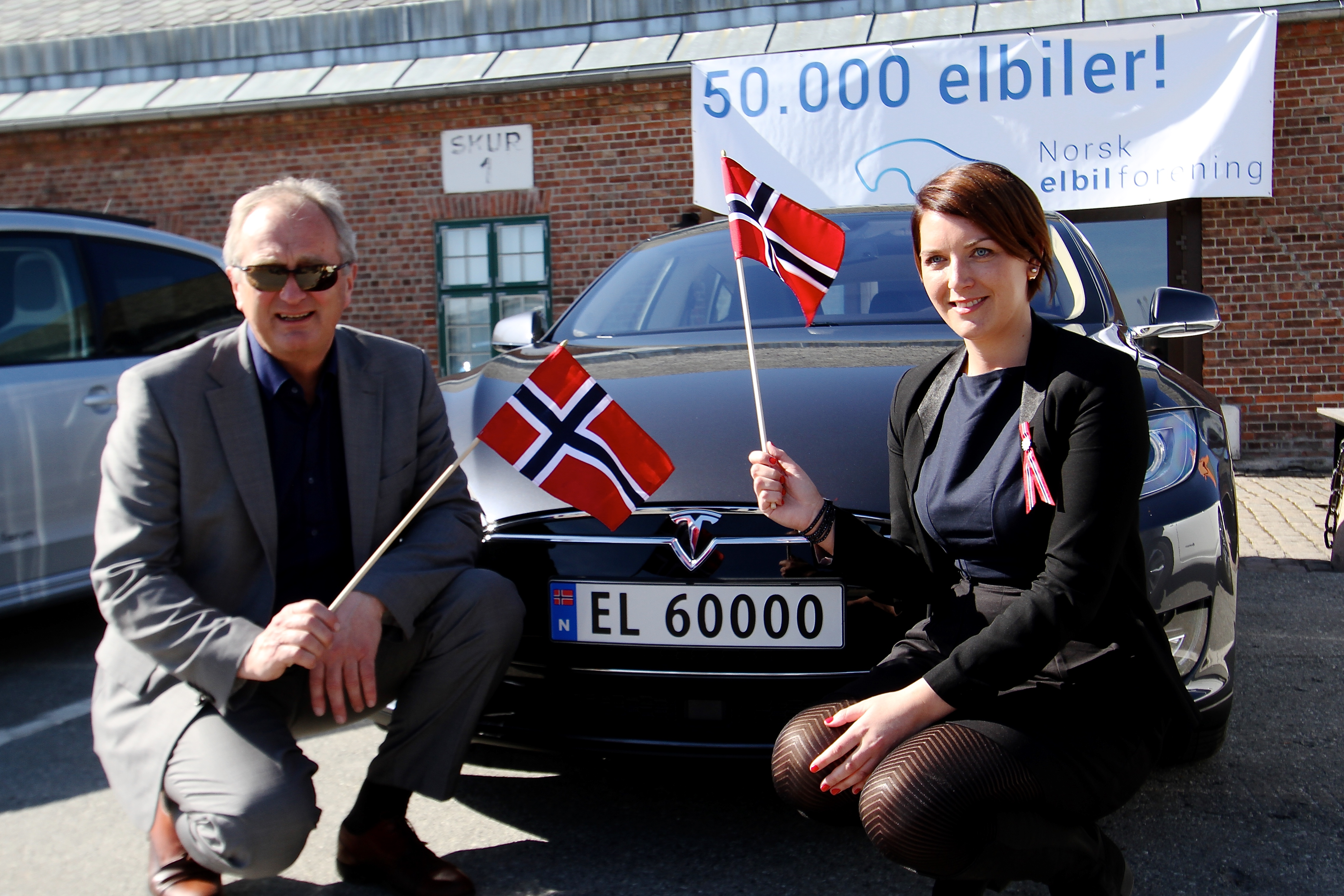
The government's initial goal of 50,000 electric cars on Norwegian roads was reached on 20 April 2015. The plate "EL 60000" was granted to the 50,000th electric car registered, which was a Tesla Model S.

The target of 50,000 electric cars on Norwegian roads was reached on 20 April 2015, more than two years earlier than expected. In early March 2015 negotiations began among parties represented in the Parliament to define the future of all motor vehicles and fuel taxes. The Liberal Party wanted all the benefits to continue beyond the established quota. The Ministry of Finance also made a comprehensive review of all motor vehicle taxes. The two purchase tax exemptions cost the government about 3 billion krone (around US$480 million) in lost revenue just in 2014, and up to 4 billion krone (around US$640 million) if all the other benefits are accounted for. Despite passing the established cap of 50,000 electric cars, the tax benefits were expected to continue at least until the end of 2016.

==== Phase out of incentives ====
In May 2015 the Government decided to keep the existing incentives through 2017, and the political parties in Parliament agreed to reduced and phase out some of the incentives. Beginning in January 2018, electric car owners will be required to pay half of the yearly road license fee and the full rate as of 2020. The value-added tax (VAT) exemption for electric cars will end in 2018, but replaced by a new scheme, which may be subjected to a ceiling that could be reduced as technology develops. The agreement also gave local authorities the right to decide whether electric cars can park for free and use public transport lanes.

In March 2016, the Ministry of Transport issued new regulations for parking in locations with access to the general public. The new parking regulations, that go into effect on January 1, 2017, terminated the free parking for zero-emission vehicles, but established that Municipalities can introduce payment exemption for electric and hydrogen powered motor vehicles on municipal parking locations. As of September 2016, the city councils of Trondheim and Tønsberg decided to introduce full payment for EVs from 2017; the cities of Bodø and Tromsø will introduce payment for parking in downtown but exempted parking outside the city's center; and the cities of Oslo, Mandal and Drammen decided to keep free parking for zero-emission vehicles.

=== Portugal ===
The Portuguese Government launched in early 2008 a national Programme for Electric Mobility called Mobi.E.

Mobi.E is deploying a national electric mobility system. The system was designed to be scalable and used in multiple geographies, overcoming the current situation of lack of communication among the different electric mobility experiences that are being deployed in Europe. By the first semester of 2011, a wide public network of 1 300 normal and 50 fast charging points will be fully implemented in the main 25 cities of the country.

EVs are fully exempt from both the Vehicle Tax due upon purchase (Imposto Sobre Veículos) and the annual Circulation Tax (Imposto Único de Circulação). Personal income tax provides an allowance of EUR 803 upon the purchase of EVs. EVs are exempt from the 5%-10% company car tax rates which are part of the Corporation Income Tax. The Budget Law provides for an increase of the depreciation costs related to the purchase of EVs for the purpose of Corporation Income Tax.

Portugal established a government subsidy of €5,000 for the first 5,000 new electric cars sold in the country. In addition, there is in place a €1,500 incentive if the consumer turns in a used car as part of the down payment for the new electric car. Electric cars are also exempt from the registration tax.

=== Romania ===
As of April 2011, Romania offers a government grant of up to 25% of the price (up to a maximum of €5,000) for the purchase of a new electric car. Furthermore, through the cash-for-clunkers program (scrappage program), those who wish to purchase an electric car will receive vouchers of over €5,000 total in return for their used car. For hybrid vehicles, with or without plug-in capabilities, a €550 grant is offered, plus an additional €160 grant for hybrid vehicles emitting under 100g/km of CO_{2}. Combined with the cash-for-clunkers program, the total grant is up to €2200. Electric and hybrid vehicles are exempt from the environmental tax, which also acts as a registration tax. From March 2015, electric vehicles are also exempt from the annual tax, while hybrid vehicles have a 95% reduction.

In 2016, the "Rabla Plus" program offered a government grant of €5,000 for the purchase of a new electric car. In 2017, the "Rabla Plus" grant program increased to EUR 10,000 for the purchase of a pure electric vehicle (BEV). Furthermore, car owners will receive an additional €1,400 if they end their registration of a car older than eight years.

=== Spain ===
Spain's government aimed to have 1 million electric cars on the roads by 2014 as part of a plan to cut energy consumption and dependence on expensive imports, Industry Minister Miguel Sebastián said.

In May 2011 the Spanish government approved a €72 million (US$103 million) fund for year 2011 to promote electric vehicles. The incentives include direct subsidies for the acquisition of new electric cars for up to 25% of the purchase price, before tax, to a maximum of €6,000 per vehicle (US$8,600), and 25% of the gross purchase price of other electric vehicles such as buses and vans, with a maximum of €15,000 or €30,000, depending on the range and type of vehicle. Several regional government grant incentives for the purchase of alternative fuel vehicles including electric and hybrid vehicles. In Aragón, Asturias, Baleares, Madrid, Navarra, Valencia, Castilla-La Mancha, Murcia, Castilla y León electric vehicles are eligible to a €6,000 tax incentive and hybrids to €2,000.

=== Sweden ===
In September 2011 the Swedish government approved a 200 million kr program, effective starting in January 2012, to provide a subsidy of 40,000 kr per car for the purchase of electric cars and other "super green cars" with ultra-low carbon emissions (below 50 grams of carbon dioxide per km). There is also an exemption from the annual circulation tax for the first five years from the date of their first registration that benefits owners of electric vehicles with an energy consumption of 37 kWh per 100 km or less, and hybrid vehicles with CO_{2} emissions of 120 g/km or less. In addition, for both electric and hybrid vehicles, the taxable value of the car for the purposes of calculating the benefit in kind of a company car under personal income tax is reduced by 40% compared with the corresponding or comparable gasoline- or diesel-powered car. The reduction of the taxable value has a cap of 16,000 kr per year.

As of July 2014, a total of 5,028 new "super clean cars" had been registered in the country since January 2012, and because the government allocated funds for a total of 5,000 super clean cars between 2012 and 2014, the fund has been exhausted. BIL Sweden, the national association for the automobile industry, requested the government an additional 100 million kr to cover the subsidy for another 2,500 registrations of new super clean cars between August and December 2014. In December 2014 the Riksdagen, the Swedish parliament, approved an appropriation of 215 million kr to finance the super clean car subsidies in 2015. The appropriation for 2015, according to the parliamentary decision and subsequent government decision, was to also be used for the retroactive payment of the super green cars registered in 2014 that did not receive the subsidy.

The Government raised the appropriation for the super green car rebate by 132 million kr for 2015 and by 94 million kr for 2016. Beginning in 2016, only zero emissions cars are entitled to receive the full 40,000 kr premium, while other super green cars, plug-in hybrids, receive half premium. The exemption for the first five years of ownership from the annual circulation tax is still in place. In 2016, in order to promote the introduction of electricity-powered buses in the market, the Government planned to allocate 50 million kr for 2016 and 100 million kr per year between 2017 and 2019 to introduce an electric bus premium.

Two alternative proposals are being considered by the Swedish government regarding the introduction of a bonus-malus system. Both proposals entail changes to vehicle and car benefit taxation and the premium system for purchases of new cars. An official inquiry report was due by 29 April 2016. The goal is for the system to enter into force on 1 January 2017. The new bonus-malus system, starting 1 July 2018, will offer electric car buyers a bonus of 60,000 kr.

The bonus of 70,000 kr offered to electric car buyers was abolished in November 2022 by the new right-wing government, effective immediately. A 2026 study found that the removal led to a significant decline in private leasing of electric vehicles, while other market segments remained stable, and to a significant increase in EV leasing prices.

=== Switzerland ===
Switzerland has a car import tax which is 4% of the purchase price (before adding the VAT) which is waived for electric cars. Since Switzerland consists of 26 cantons which have their own legislature, additional incentives for plug-in electric vehicles differ between the respective regions. The current list can be downloaded from the website of the Swiss Department of Energy.

There are no additional incentives on the actual purchase price, but some cantons offer road tax cuts. The Swiss road tax is a yearly recurring fixed amount calculated based on the specifications of the tax payers car. Currently, only the cantons Glarus (GL), Solothurn (SO), Ticino (TI) and Zurich (ZH) are completely waiving the tax for plug-in electric vehicles.

Calculation example for Zurich

Based on a usual car with the following specification:

- Engine: 2 L
- Total weight: 1800 kg
- Energy efficiency: C
- Year: 2013

The resulting tax to be paid per year will be SFr 278. Hence when calculating with a life expectancy of 10 years, the car owner in this example might save around SFr 2,780 when buying a plug-in electric car.

However, since the tax on fossil fuels are relatively high in all European countries, including Switzerland, there is still an indirect, but quite strong incentive for car buyers to decide for energy efficient vehicles.

Based on the following examples:

- Fuel economy: 7.8 L/100 km (30 mpg_{‑US}) unleaded
- Driving habits: 15,000 km (9,300 mi) per year
- Fuel tax: SFr 0.7312 per liter (SFr 2.7679 per gallon)
- Carbon tax (since January 1, 2014): SFr 0.1414 per liter (SFr 0.5353 per gallon)

The resulting taxes on the burned fuels will be around SFr 1,021 per year, which results in SFr 10,210 over the car's 10-year lifetime.

=== United Kingdom ===
==== Plug-in Car Grant ====
The Plug-in Car Grant (PiCG) started on 1 January 2011 and is available across the UK. The program reduces the up-front cost of eligible cars by providing a 25% grant towards the cost of new plug-in cars capped at £5,000 (US$7,450). From 1 April 2015, the purchase price cap was raised to cover up to 35% discount of the vehicle's recommended retail price, up to the already existing £5,000 limit. This change means electric cars priced under £20,000 will be able to take advantage of most or all of the £5,000 discount. Both private and business fleet buyers are eligible for this grant, which is received at the point of purchase and the subsidy is claimed back by the manufacturer afterwards. The subsidy programme is managed in a similar way to the grant made as part of the 2009 Car Scrappage Scheme, allowing consumers to buy an eligible car discounted at the point of purchase with the subsidy claimed back by the manufacturer afterwards.

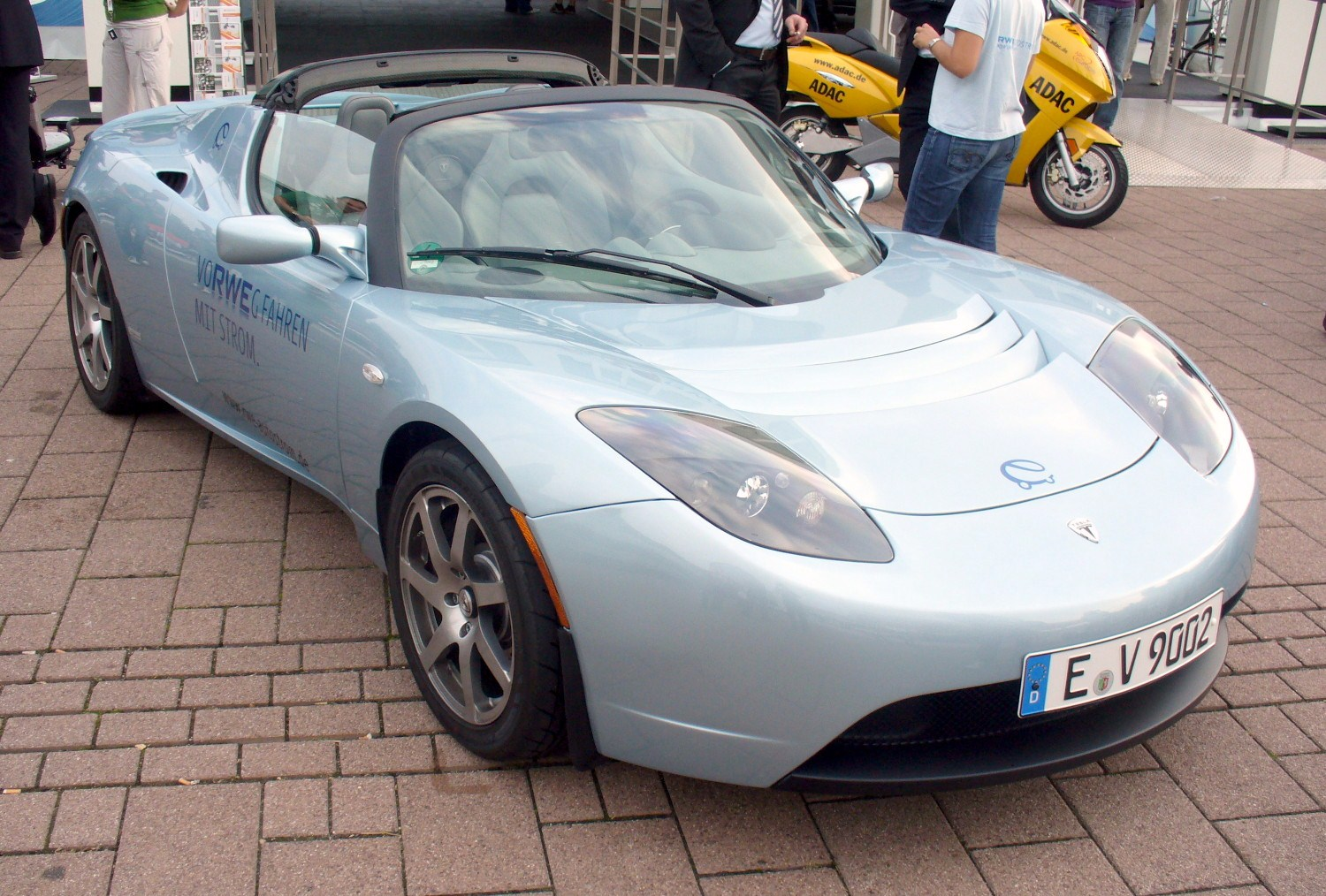
The Tesla Roadster was available in the UK but not included on the government's plug-in electric car grant list of eligible vehicles.

The government announced in April 2014 that funding for the full grant of up to £5,000 will remain in place until either 50,000 grants have been issued or 2017, whichever is first. As forecasts estimated that the scheme will reach its 50,000 limit around November 2015, the government announced in August 2015 that the Plug-in Car Grant will continue until at least February 2016 for all plug-in cars with CO_{2} emissions of 75 g/km of under. The Government also announced that a minimum of £200 million (US$311 million) has been made available to continue the Plug-in Car Grant.

Vehicles eligible for the subsidy must meet the following criteria:

- Vehicle type: Only ultra-low emission cars are eligible (vehicle category M1). Motorbikes, quadricycles and vans are not covered.
- Carbon dioxide exhaust emissions: Vehicles must emit equal or less than 75 grams of carbon dioxide (CO_{2}) per kilometre driven.
- Range: Electric vehicles (EVs) must be able to travel a minimum of 70 miles (110 km) between charges. Plug-in hybrid electric vehicles (PHEVs) must have a minimum all-electric range of 10 miles (16 km).
- Minimum top speed: Vehicles must be able to reach a speed of 60 miles per hour (97 km/h) or more.
- Warranty: Vehicles must have a 3-year or 60,000 miles (97,000 km) vehicle warranty (guarantee) and a 3-year battery and electric drive train warranty, with the option of extending the battery warranty for an extra 2 years('drive train' means the parts that send power from the engine to the wheels. These include the clutch, transmission (gear box), drive shafts, U-joints and differential).
- Battery performance: Vehicles must have either a minimum 5-year warranty on the battery and electric drive train as standard, or extra evidence of battery performance to show reasonable performance after 3 years of use
- Electrical safety: Vehicles must comply with certain regulations (UN-ECE Reg 100.01) that show that they are electrically safe.
- Crash safety: To make sure cars will be safe in a crash, they must either have: EC whole vehicle type approval (EC WVTA, not small series) or evidence that the car has appropriate levels of safety as judged by international standards.

In February 2015 the government announced that to take account of rapidly developing technology, and the growing range of ULEVs on the British market, the criteria for the plug-in car grant was updated and from April 2015, eligible ultra-low emission vehicles (ULEVs) must meet criteria in one of the following categories depending on emission levels and zero-emission-capable mileage, with a technology neutral approach, which means that hydrogen fuel cell cars are also eligible for the grant:

- Category 1: CO_{2} emissions of less than 50g/km and a zero emission range of at least 70 mi (110 km).
- Category 2: CO_{2} emissions of less than 50g/km and a zero emission range between 10 and 69 mi (16 and 111 km).
- Category 3: CO_{2} emissions of 50–75g/km and a zero emission range of at least 20 mi (32 km).

In December 2015, the Department for Transport (DfT) announced that Plug-in car grant was extended until March 2018 to encourage more than 100,000 UK motorists to buy cleaner vehicles. A total funding of £400 million (~US$600 million) is available for the extension. To reflect the changes in the British market, the criteria for the Plug-in Car Grant was updated and the maximum grant drops from £5,000 (~US$7,450) to £4,500 (~US$6,700). For the extension, the amount of the grant is linked in directly with the Office for Low Emission Vehicles three vehicle categories issued in April 2015. The eligible ultra-low emission vehicles (ULEVs) must meet criteria in one of three categories depending on emission levels (CO_{2} emissions bands between 50 and 75g/km) and zero-emission-capable mileage (minimum of 10 mi (16 km)), with a technology neutral approach, which means that hydrogen fuel cell cars are eligible for the grant. The updated scheme went into force on 1 March 2016.

A price cap is in place, with all Category 1 plug-in vehicles eligible for the full grant no matter what their purchase price, while Category 2 and 3 models with a list price of more than £60,000 (~US$90,000) are eligible for the grant. Vehicles with a zero-emission range of at least 70 mi (110 km) (category 1), including hydrogen fuel cell vehicles, get a full £4,500 (~US$6,700), but plug-in hybrids (categories 2 and 3) costing under £60,000 (~US$90,000) receive £2,500 (~US$3,725). The grant scheme will come under review when a cumulative total of 40,000 Category 1 claims, and 45,000 Category 2 and 3 combined sales have been made. Both these totals will include cars sold before March 2016.

As of October 2016, the following 31 cars available in the British market are eligible for the grant according to their category:

Eligible category 1 vehicles

BMW i3, BYD e6, Citroen C-Zero, Ford Focus Electric, Hyundai Ioniq Electric, Kia Soul EV, Mahindra e2o, Mercedes-Benz B-Class Electric Drive, Nissan e-NV200 5- and 7-seater Combi, Nissan Leaf, Peugeot iOn, Renault Fluence Z.E., Renault Zoe, Smart Fortwo electric drive, Tesla Model S, Toyota Mirai, Volkswagen e-Golf, and Volkswagen e-Up!.

Eligible category 2 vehicles

Audi A3 e-tron (MY 2016 only), BMW 225xe, BMW 330e, Kia Optima PHEV, Mercedes-Benz C350 e, Mitsubishi Outlander P-HEV (except GX3h 4Work), Toyota Prius Plug-in Hybrid, Vauxhall Ampera, Volkswagen Golf GTE, Volkswagen Passat GTE, Volvo V60 Plug-in Hybrid (D5 and D6 Twin Engine), and Volvo XC90 T8 Twin Engine Momentum.

Ineligible vehicles

Category 2 or 3 vehicles with a recommended retail price over £60,000 aren't eligible for a grant. This includes: BMW i8 (category 2), Mercedes-Benz S500 Plug-in Hybrid (category 3), and Porsche Panamera S E-Hybrid (category 3).

The Tesla Roadster was not included in the government's list of eligible vehicles for the plug-in electric car grant. Tesla Motors stated that the company applied for the scheme, but did not complete its application.

In 2018 the PICG was reduced from £4,500 to £3,500, and in March 2020 it was cut to £3,000.

In addition to the extension of the Plug-in Grant, the government also announced it will continue the "Electric Vehicle Homecharge Scheme." Starting in March 2016 owners of ultra-low emission vehicles who install a dedicated charge point at their home, covering roughly half the average cost, will get £500 (~US$750) towards the cost of installing the charging point, rather than the previous £700 (~US$1,050) maximum.

==== Plug-in Van Grant ====
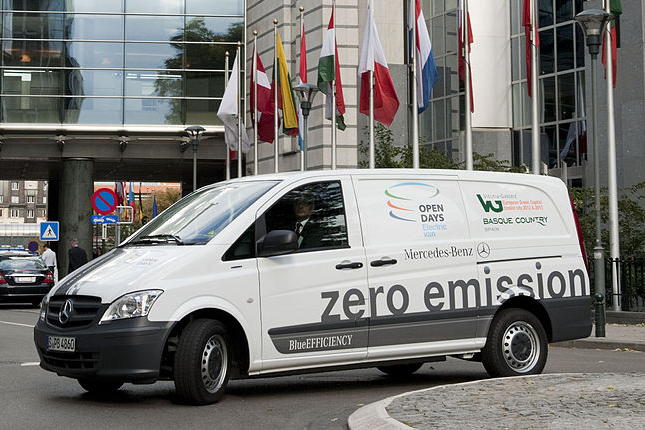
The Mercedes-Benz Vito E-Cell is eligible for the Plug-In Van Grant.

The Plug-In Van Grant (PiVG) began in February 2012. Van-buyers can receive 20% – up to £8,000 – off the cost of a plug-in van. To be eligible for the scheme, vans have to meet performance criteria to ensure safety, range, and ultra-low tailpipe emissions. Consumers, both business and private will receive the discount at the point of purchase. The Plug-In Van Grant scheme was extended in October 2016 to make electric trucks above 3.5 tonnes eligible for grants of up to £20,000, when businesses switch their large trucks to an electric vehicle. The government also announced their commitment for an additional £4 million to the scheme so that all vans and trucks meeting the eligibility requirements can benefit from the grant scheme. The extension of the Plug-In Van grant means that N2 vans (3.5 – 12 tonnes gross weight) and N3 vans (over 12 tonnes gross weight) are now eligible.

The eligibility criteria for vans with a gross weight of 3.5 tonnes or less (N1 van) are:

- Vehicle type: only new N1 vans are eligible. This includes pre-registration conversions (normal, internal combustion engine vans that were converted to battery or hybrid versions by specialist converters before the car's first registration).
- Carbon dioxide exhaust emissions: vehicles must emit less than 75 grams of carbon dioxide (CO_{2}) per kilometre driven.
- Range: eligible fully electric vans must be able to travel a minimum of 60 mi (97 km) between charges. Plug-in hybrid electric vehicles (PHEVs) must have a minimum electric range of 10 miles (16 km).
- Minimum top speed: vehicles must be able to reach a speed of 50 mph (80 km/h) or more.
- Warranty: Vehicles must have a 3-year or 60,000 mi (97,000 km) vehicle warranty (guarantee) and a 3-year battery and electric drive train warranty, with the option of extending the battery warranty for an extra 2 years
- Battery performance: vehicles must have either a minimum 5-year warranty on the battery and electric drive train as standard

or extra evidence of battery performance to show reasonable performance after 3 years of use

- Electrical safety: vehicles must comply with certain regulations (UN-ECE Reg 100.00) that show that they are electrically safe.
- Crash safety To make sure cars will be safe in a crash, they must either have EC whole vehicle type approval (EC WVTA, not small series) or evidence that the car has appropriate levels of safety as judged by international standards.

As of December 2016, the number of claims made through the Plug-in Van Grant scheme totaled 2,938 units since the launch of the programme in 2012, up from 1,906 made by the end of December 2015. As of October 2016 the following nine vans are eligible for the grant: BD Otomotive eTraffic, BD Otomotiv eDucato, Citroën Berlingo, Mercedes-Benz Vito E-Cell, Mitsubishi Outlander GX3h 4Work, Nissan e-NV200, Peugeot ePartner, Renault Kangoo Z.E., and Smith Electric Edison.

==== Number of beneficiaries ====
The number of eligible registered plug-in electric vehicles passed the 25,000 unit milestone in January 2015. As of March 2017, the number of eligible registered plug-in electric cars that have benefited with the subsidy totaled 94,541 units since the launch of the programme in 2011. As of December 2016, the number of claims made through the Plug-in Van Grant scheme totaled 2,938 units since the launch of the programme in 2012. About 90,000 plug-in electric vehicles have been registered in the UK up until December 2016, including over 85,000 plug-in hybrids and all-electric cars, and about 4,000 plug-in commercial vans. Not all vehicles were eligible for the grant schemes.

==== Plugged-in Places ====
On 19 November 2009, Andrew Adonis, the Secretary of State for Transport, announced a scheme called "Plugged-in-Places", making available £30 million to be shared between three and six cities to investigate further the viability of providing power supply for electric vehicles, and encouraging local government and business to participate and bid for funds.

The UK government is supporting the "Plugged-In Places" program to install vehicle recharging points across the UK. The scheme offers match-funding to consortia of businesses and public sector partners to support the installation of EV recharging infrastructure in lead places across the UK. There are eight Plugged-In Places:East of England; Greater Manchester; London; Midlands; Milton Keynes; North East;

Northern Ireland; and Scotland. The Government also published an Infrastructure Strategy in June 2011.

==== London congestion charge ====
All-electric vehicles (BEVs) and eligible plug-in hybrid electric vehicles (PHEVs) qualify for a 100% discount from the London congestion charge. A plug-in electric drive vehicle qualifies if the vehicle is registered with the Driver and Vehicle Licensing Agency (DVLA) and has a fuel type of 'electric', or alternatively, if the vehicle is a 'plug-in hybrid' and is on the Government's list of PHEVs eligible for the OLEV grant. As of February 2015, approved PHEVs include all extended-range cars such as the BMW i3 with range extender and Vauxhall Ampera, and plug-in hybrids that emit 75g/km or less of CO_{2} and that meet the Euro 5 standard for air quality, such as the Audi A3 Sportback e-tron, BMW i8, Mitsubishi Outlander P-HEV, and Toyota Prius Plug-in Hybrid.

The original Greener Vehicle Discount was substituted by the Ultra Low Emission Discount (ULED) scheme that went into effect on 1 July 2013. The ULED introduced more stringent emission standards that limited the free access to the congestion charge zone to any car or van that emits 75g/km or less of CO_{2} and meets the Euro 5 emission standards for air quality. As of July 2013 there are no internal combustion-only vehicles that meet these criteria. The measure is designed to limit the growing number of diesel vehicles on London's roads. Mayor Boris Johnson approved the new scheme in April 2013, after taking into account a number of comments received during the 12-week public consultation that took place. About 20,000 owners of vehicles registered for the Greener Vehicle Discount by June 2013 were granted a three-year sunset period (until 24 June 2016) before they have to pay the full congestion charge.

Effective from 8 April 2019, the ULED scheme will be replaced with the Cleaner Vehicle Discount. This means that from April 2019, only vehicles which are Euro 6, emit up to 75g/km of CO_{2} and have a minimum 20 mile zero emission range, will qualify for the discount. A further phase from October 2021 will mean that only zero-emission vehicles (pure electric vehicles and hydrogen fuel cell vehicles) will qualify for the discount, which will be phased out completely from December 2025.

== North America ==
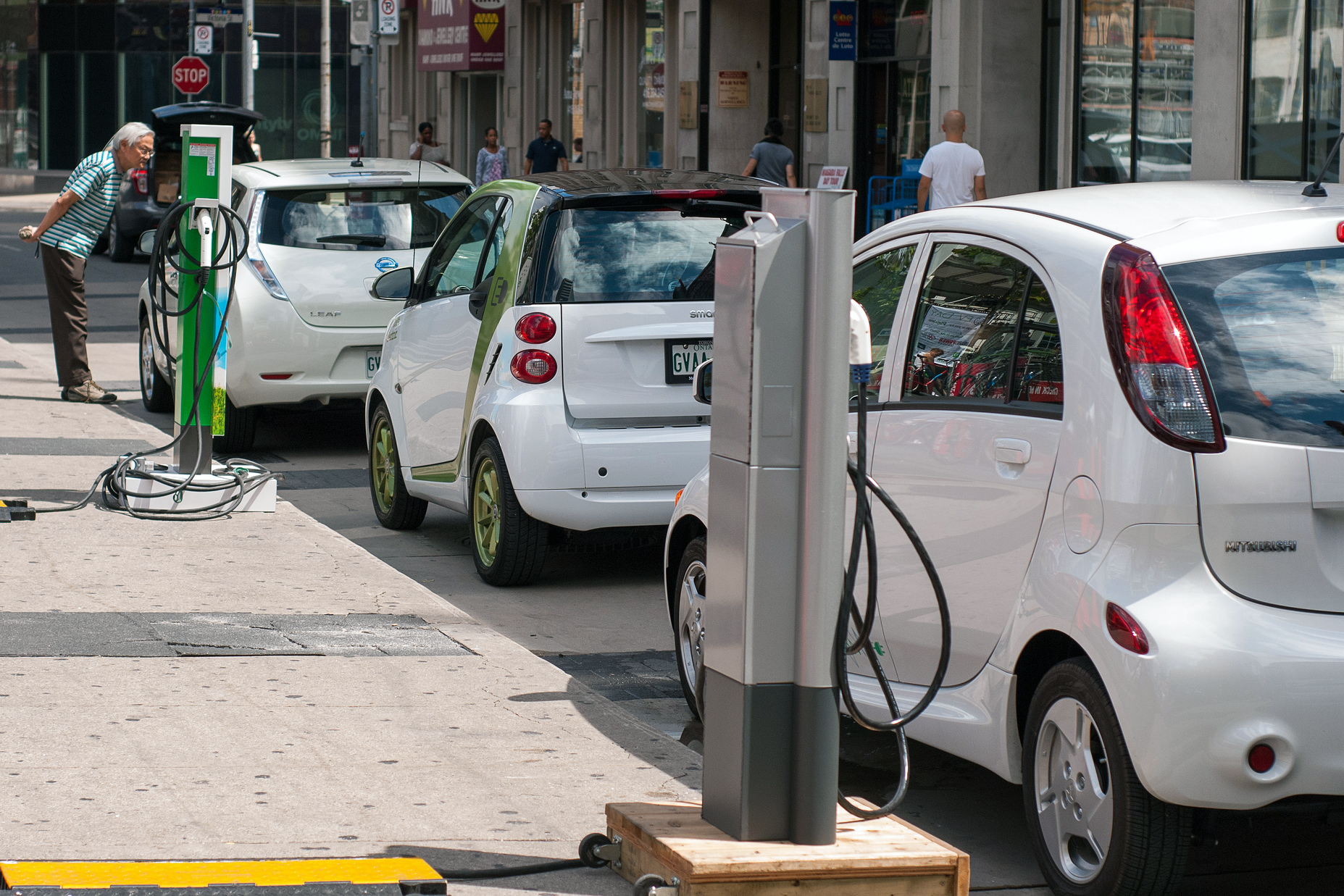
Nissan Leaf, Smart electric drive, and Mitsubishi i-MiEV (from farthest to closest) electric cars in downtown Toronto

=== Canada ===
The Government of Canada introduced a federal Incentive for Zero Emission Vehicles (iZEV) program on May 1, 2019, which has since been suspended, as of January 2025. Under iZEV, the purchaser or lessee is entitled to a rebate of up to CA$5,000 on the after-tax cost of an eligible new electric- or hydrogen-powered vehicle in addition to any provincial incentive programs. The amount of the rebate is determined by Transport Canada based on the vehicle's battery capacity and electric range, and all eligible vehicles must have a list price of CA$45,000 or less (CA$55,000 or less if the vehicle seats seven or more passengers).

Simultaneously, the federal government launched a federal Zero-Emission Vehicle Infrastructure Program administered by Natural Resources Canada. The program provides rebates to businesses and governments for new electric vehicle charging stations in public places, workplaces, multi-family residential buildings, and in public transit and delivery fleets.

==== Ontario ====
Former rebate program

The Ontario Ministry of Transportation (MTO) established the Electric Vehicle Incentive Program (EVIP) – later renamed the Electric and Hydrogen Vehicle Incentive Program (EHVIP) – in 2010. To qualify, Battery Electric Vehicles (BEVs) and Plug-In Hybrid Electric Vehicles (PHEVs) had to be purchased or leased from a seller in Ontario and owned or leased for at least 12 months. Leased vehicles with 12-month terms received 33% of the incentive, 24-month lease terms received 66%, and lease terms 36 months or longer received the full incentive. Vehicles were required to be on a government-developed list of approved vehicles to qualify, and vehicles with a Manufacturer's Suggested Retail Price (MSRP) of CA$75,000 or greater were not eligible for the incentive. Electric vehicles with a battery size of 5 -16 kWh were eligible for incentives from CA$6,000 to CA$10,000. Vehicles with a battery size exceeding 16 kWh qualified for CA$9,000 to CA$13,000. Vehicles with five or more seats were eligible for an additional CA$1,000. Demonstration vehicles under a specified mileage and used exclusively for test drives at dealerships or leasing companies were also eligible. Applications for incentives were required to be submitted within 3 months of the vehicle's provincial registration. Prior to the cancellation of the program, the Government of Ontario included rebates of up to CA$14,000 for electric and hybrid vehicles. The EHVIP was financed by proceeds from Ontario's participation with Quebec and California in the Western Climate Initiative (WCI) cap and trade program.

The program (and the companion incentive program to encourage private businesses to install charging stations) was cancelled on July 11, 2018, after the government of Premier Doug Ford began the withdrawal of Ontario from the WCI. Rebates were still issued if the vehicle had been delivered to the consumer, registered, and plated on or before July 11; or if the vehicle was in the inventory of a dealership on or before July 11 or was ordered directly from the manufacturer before that date, provided that the vehicle was delivered to the consumer, registered, and plated by September 10, 2018.

Green vehicle plates

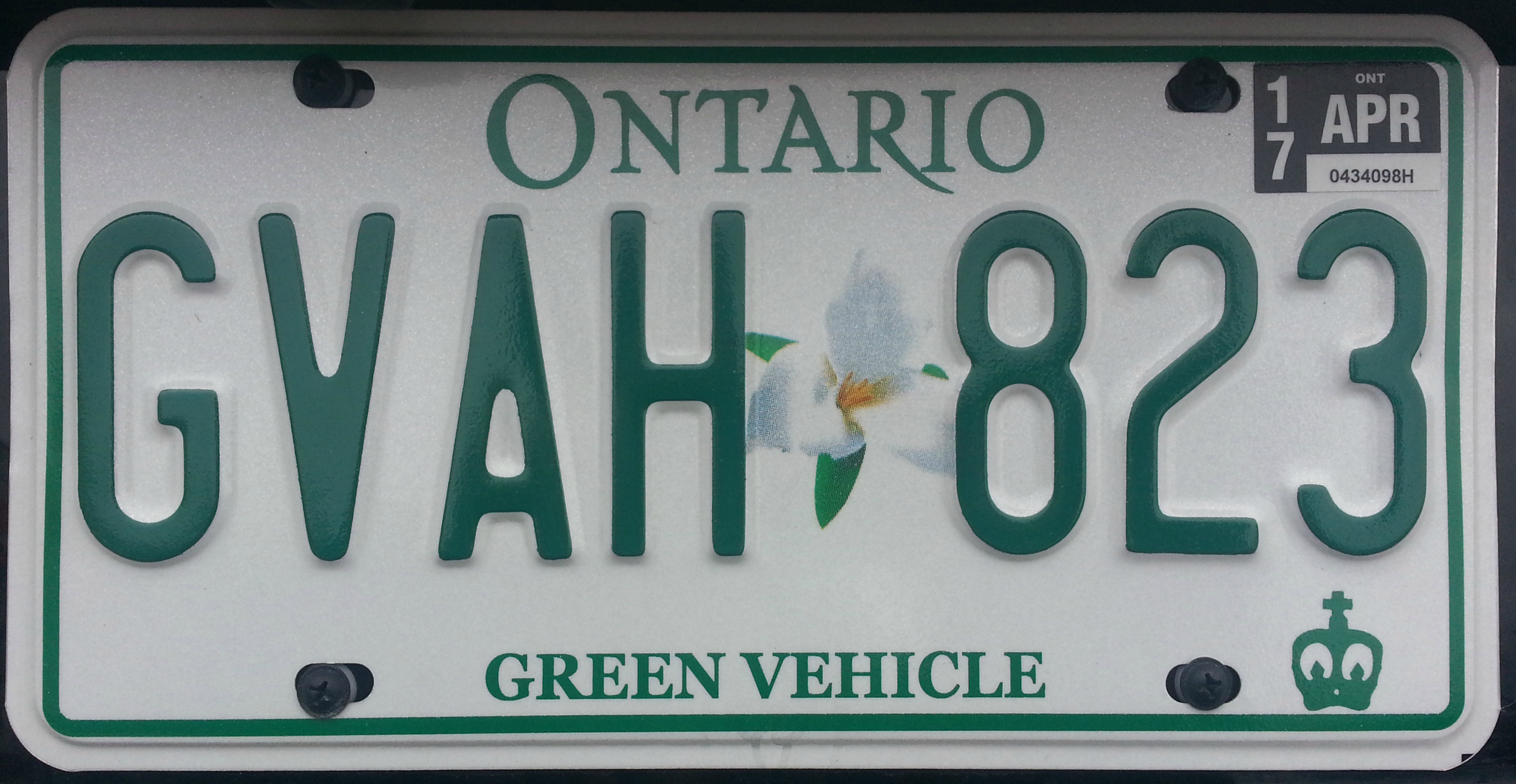
Design of the Ontario Green Vehicle License Plate

Electric vehicles in Ontario are eligible for special license plates, officially called Green Vehicle License Plates, from the Ministry of Transportation. In addition to a green colour scheme distinct from the province's typical blue and white license plates, these green plates permit BEV and PHEV owners to travel in the province's high-occupancy vehicle (HOV) and travel at no cost in the high-occupancy toll (HOT) lanes, regardless of the number of passengers in the vehicle.

==== Quebec ====
Quebec began offering rebates of up to CA$8,000 (~ US$5,600) beginning on January 1, 2012, for the purchase of new plug-in electric vehicles equipped with a minimum of 4 kWh battery, and new hybrid electric vehicles were eligible for a CA$1,000 rebate. All-electric vehicles with high-capacity battery packs were eligible for the full CA$8,000 rebate, and lower incentives were set for low-range electric cars and plug-in hybrids. Quebec's government earmarked CA$50 million (~ US$49.9 million) for the program, and the maximum rebate amount was set to be slowly reduced every year until a maximum of CA$3,000 in 2015, but the rebates would continue until the fund runs out. There was also a ceiling for the maximum number of eligible vehicles: 10,000 for all-electric vehicles and plug-in hybrids, and 5,000 for conventional hybrids.

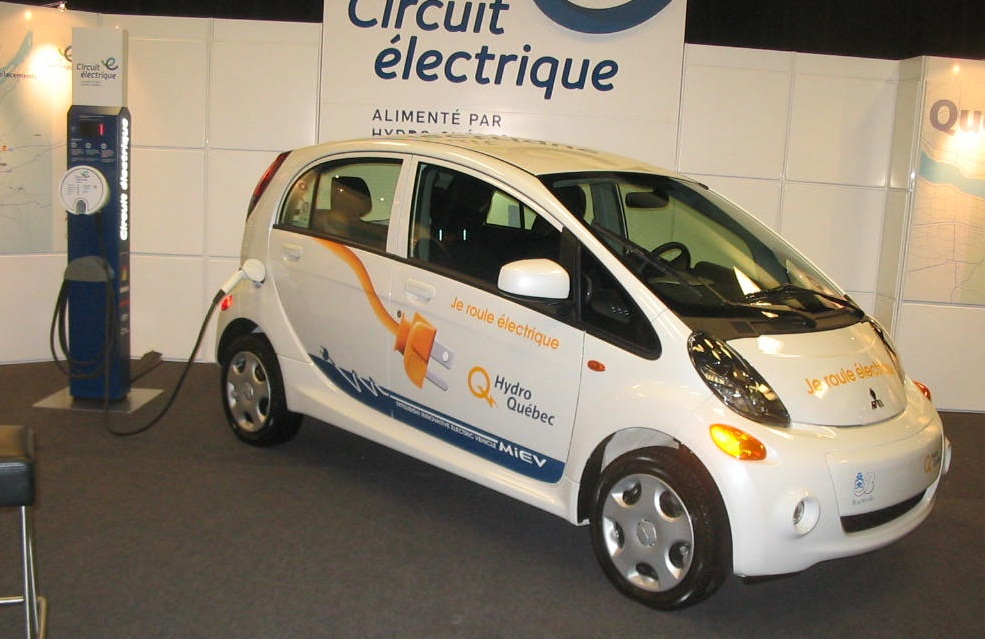
Mitsubishi i MiEV from Hydro-Québec showcased at the 2012 Montreal International Auto Show

In November 2013, the provincial government announced its decision to earmark in 2014 an additional CA$65 million (~ US$45.5 million) to fund a three-year extension to the electric-vehicle rebate program. The maximum rebate was kept at CA$8,000, but a graded scale was introduced in order to spread the incentive over 10,000 or more vehicles. Quebec's government also set the goal to deploy 12,500 more electric vehicles in the province by 2017, consisting of 10,200 consumer cars, 325 taxis, and 2,000 government-fleet vehicles. Also, incentives were issued for "greening" 525 taxis, aimed to introduce 325 plug-in vehicles (275 plug-in hybrids and 50 all-electrics) and 200 conventional hybrids. The purchase incentives start at CA$20,000 for battery-electric taxis, CA$12,000 for plug-in hybrids, and CA$3,000 for conventional hybrids, with the rebate declining over time. The province planned to also subsidize 125 Level 2 stations for the taxi industry, paying 75% of the cost up to CA$5,000, and pay for the majority of costs to fund 10 Level 3 chargers for taxis.

Also in 2013, the provincial government announced it support to deploy 5,000 new charging stations. A total of 500 stations were to be located around various cities and along the province's so-called Electric Circuit route, another 1,000 near government buildings, and 3,500 at various workplaces for employee use. Businesses are eligible for a 75% rebate on installation costs up to CA$5,000 for Level 1 or Level 2 charging stations. In addition, a 50% rebate will continue to be offered to individuals for installation of home charging stations, with a maximum of CA$1,000. Also the government announced an initiative for the gradual electrification of the provincial government's own vehicle fleet. The goal is to replace vehicles of the provincial government's 34 ministers (cabinet-level officials) with plug-in hybrid or pure electric vehicles by March 2017. The government expects to bring 2,000 plug-in vehicles into the provincial fleet over the same time.

In October 2016, the National Assembly of Quebec passed a new zero emission vehicle legislation that obliges any carmaker who sells in the Canadian province more than 4,500 new vehicles per year over a three-year average, to offer their customers a minimum number of plug-in hybrid and all-electric models. Under the new law, 3.5% of the total number of autos sold by carmakers in Quebec have to be zero emissions vehicles (ZEV) starting in 2018, rising to 15.5% in 2020. A tradable credit system was created for those carmakers not fulfilling their quotas to avoid financial penalties. The quotas will be determined by Quebec's Ministry of Sustainable Development. Quebec became the first Canadian province to pass such legislation, joining ten U.S. states, including California, that have similar ZEV laws. Quebec aims to have 100,000 zero emission vehicles on the road by 2020. Initially, the provincial government set the goal in 2011 to have 300,000 plug-in vehicles on the roads by 2020.

==== British Columbia ====
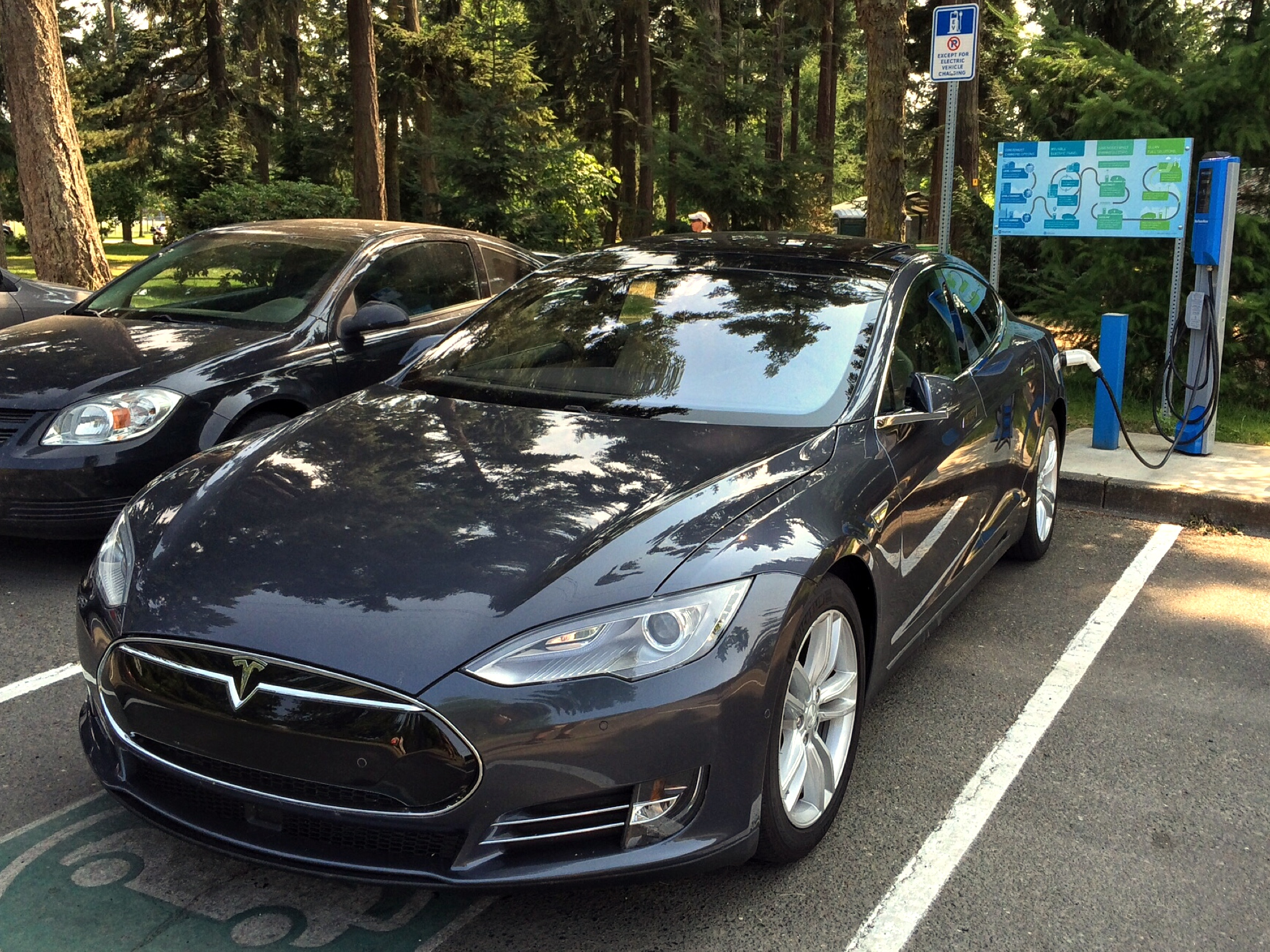
Tesla Model S charging in Parksville, British Columbia

As of June 22, 2019, British Columbia's Clean Energy Vehicle (CEV) Program, funded by the Government of British Columbia and administered by the New Car Dealers of British Columbia industry group, was renewed with funding for approximately 12,000 vehicles. This program will expire when the current 26.5 million in new funding is depleted. The current levels of incentives for vehicles under CA$55,000 are: CA$3,000 for an EV (min 85 km range), CA$1,500 for a plug-in hybrid or an extended range vehicle with a smaller battery capacity (less than 85 km range) these amounts may be reduced annually. All vehicles must be new and purchased in BC, each claim is processed by the dealer at the Point of Sale and deducted from the vehicle price after taxes. The previous program that provided funding to cover part of the cost of installing home EV charging equipment has been discontinued.

There is also a separate privately funded "SCRAP-IT" program with incentives for scrapping conventional gas-powered vehicles. Basic incentives range from bus passes to co-op car-share membership credits, or CA$200 in cash. However, there is also the option of applying for a CA$3,000 rebate cheque when buying used EV (min. 15 kWh capacity) and a CA$6,000 rebate cheque when buying a new EV (min. 15 kWh capacity). There is a requirement of 6 months of continuous driving insurance on the vehicle being scrapped from the application date backwards. Incentives are limited yearly (in 2019, there were 1,300 new and 200 used incentives). The "SCRAP-IT" rebate program currently brings the combined provincial incentives available to buyers of a qualifying new EV in BC to CA$11,000. There is an MSRP limit of CA$77,000. SCRAP-IT also introduced a home charging station program on October 18, 2018, called ZapBC. This program covers the cost of a Level 2 ChargePoint charging station. Applicants must pay taxes on the charging station and installation costs. An estimate is provided once the application is submitted.

Since 2016, PHEV and BEV owners can apply for a special decal which permits access to high-occupancy vehicle lanes regardless of the number of passengers in the vehicle.

=== Mexico ===
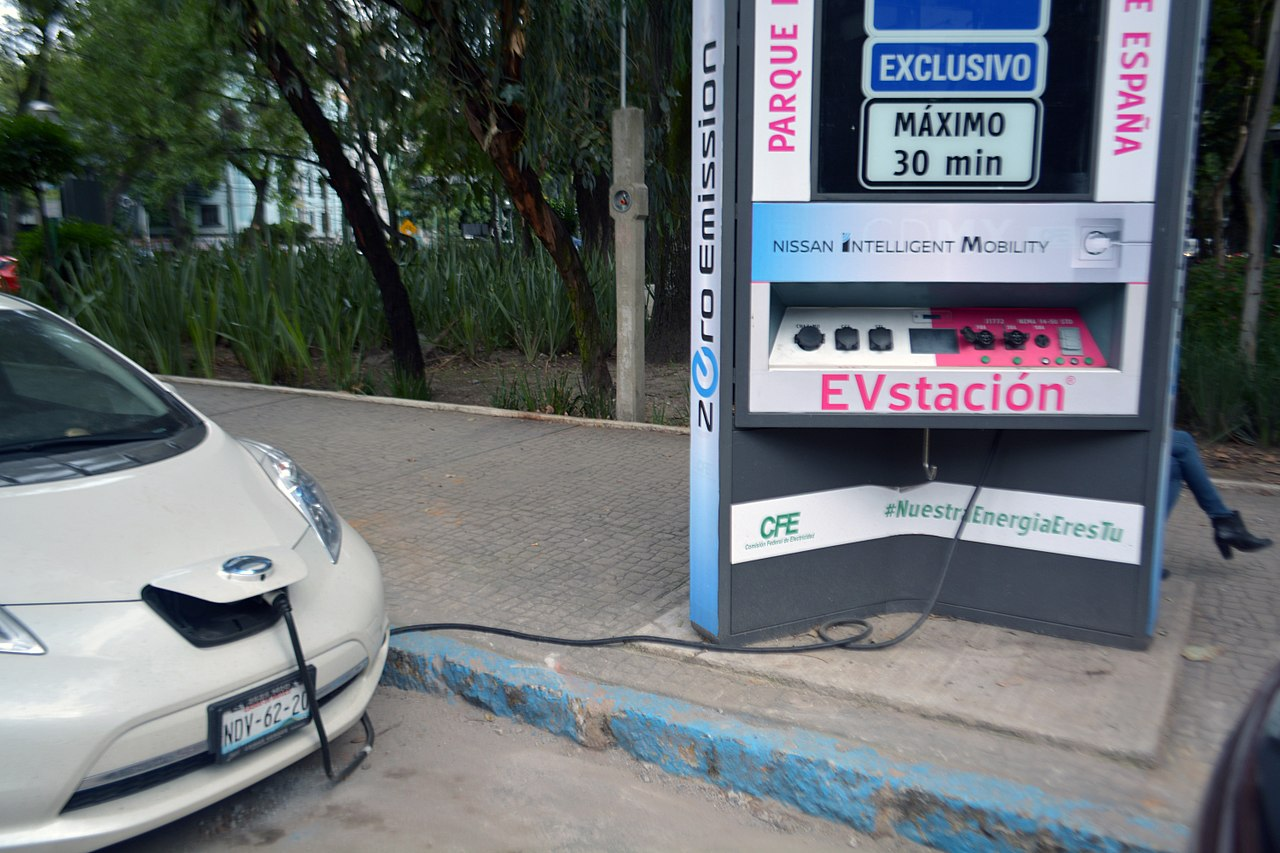
EVstation at Parque España, Mexico City. Charging is free at EVstations and available for plug-in cars, electric bicycles and motorcycles.

Mexico has set a minimum goal of clean energies as part of the electric power generation mix in for the next years (25% in 2018, 30% in 2021 and 35% in 2024) as a strategy to reach Greenhouse Gases (GHG) emission cuts. Energy efficiency is also regarded as one of the greater cost-benefit potential alternatives to achieve GHG reduction. Moreover, the transport sector in Mexico represents 44.7% of the total final consumption of energy, almost 17% more than the world average (28%). Thus, replacing low fuel efficient transport with alternative fuels is regarded as a considerable contribution to reduce 50% of its GHG emissions by the year 2050, as established by the General Law on Climate Change commitments. Therefore, incentives for PHEVs have been created both at regional and federal levels to decrease cost of ownership for the end-consumers.

Minimum fuel efficiency by vehicle class

Vehicle Class	Minimum Fuel Efficiency (km/L)
Subcompact	16.43
Compact	14.39
Multiple use	9.7
Light truck class 1	8.61
Light truck class 2	8.51

==== Federal ====
In Mexico, there are several existing incentives regarding Plug-in Hybrid Electric Vehicles (PHEV) at a federal level. Fiscal incentives for end-consumers include higher daily lease tax deductions per car ($285 versus $200 MXN), higher tax deduction caps per car ($250,000 versus $175,000 MXN), and fiscal credits for up to 30% of investments for charging stations located in public places. Furthermore, PHEVs are exempt of the tax on new vehicles (paid by the manufacturer, assembler or dealer).

Also, the electrical power service contract for residential charging stations can be independent of household consumption under a commercial rate, which can save up to 40% on electricity compared to consolidating billing in the same meter.

==== Regional ====
In Mexico City, Mexico State and Jalisco, PHEVs are exempt from vehicular emission verification. They can instead obtain an exempt hologram which unbounds them from the restrictions imposed by the vehicular emission verification programs, which limits car usage. PHEVs are also exempt of the annual ownership vehicle tax in Baja California, Durango, Mexico City, Mexico State, Nayarit, Tlaxcala and Querétaro. In Mexico City, they also have right to a 50% discount on other contributions (permits, concessions, registry, etc.), and models from 2002 to 2017 pay only an endorsement right for vehicle control services. Finally, in Mexico City, PHEVs also have preferential parking in private and public parking lots.

==== Charging station network ====
As of January 2017, in Mexico there were 700 public access charging stations for PHEVs that are privately owned. The Ministry of Energy and the state owned electric power utility, Comision Federal de Electricidad, will destine $25 million MXN to install 100 more charging stations through 2017–2018 in the metropolitan areas of Guadalajara, Monterrey and Mexico City. As of now, users of the existing network can charge their PHEVs for free, as the cost of electricity is absorbed by the owners of the establishments where the charging stations are located.

=== United States ===
==== Federal government ====
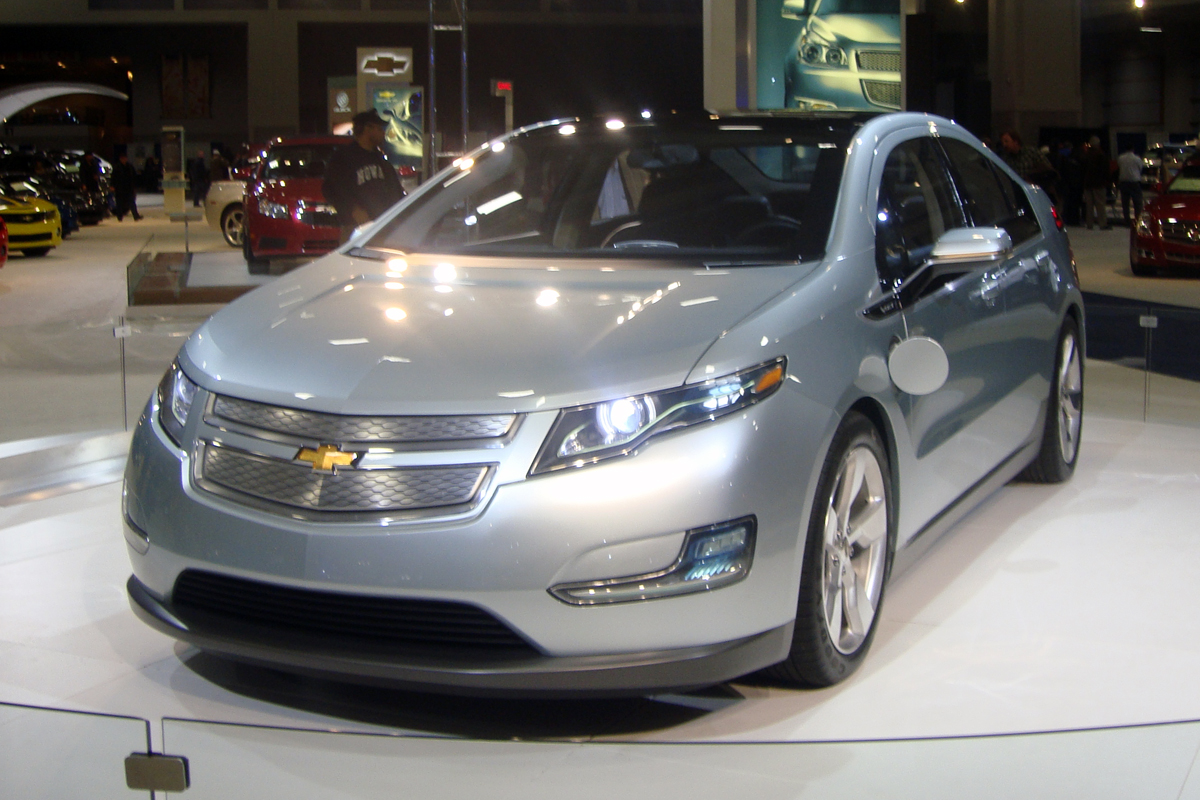

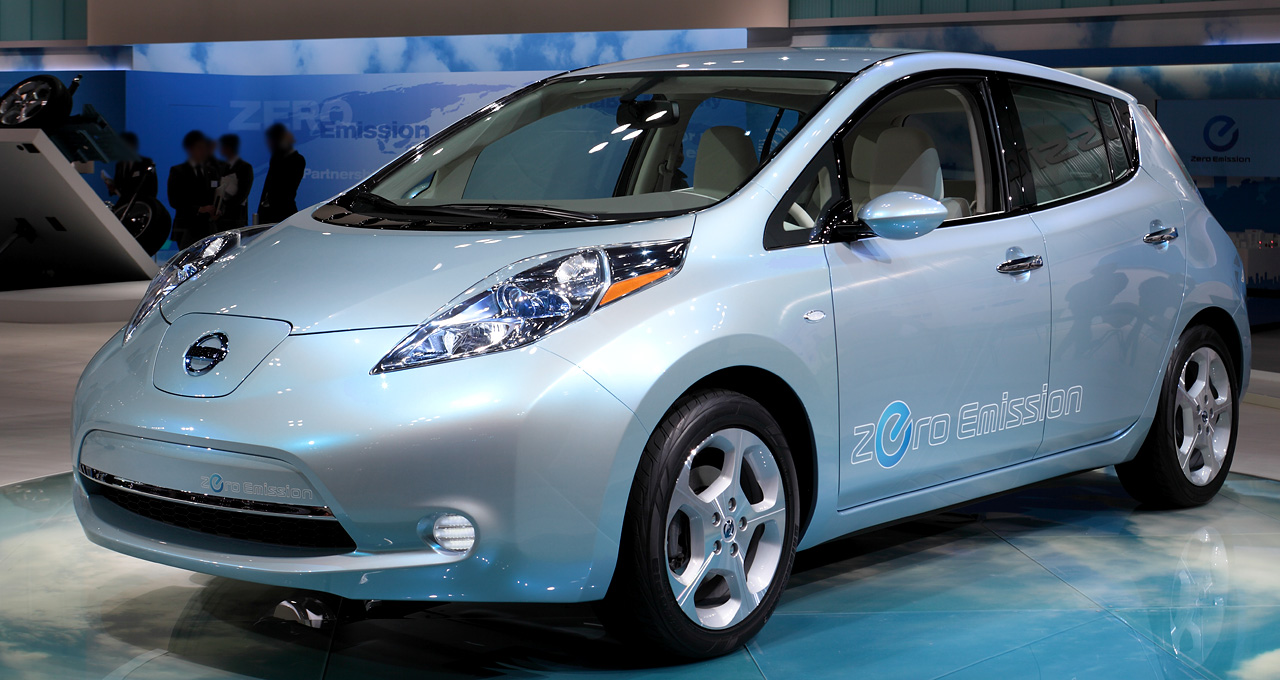
The Chevrolet Volt (top) and the Nissan Leaf (bottom) are PEVs eligible for a U.S. federal tax credit up to US$7,500, and additional incentives in several states.

In his 2011 State of the Union address, President Barack Obama set the goal for the U.S. to become the first country to have one million electric vehicles on the road by 2015. For this purpose, his administration pledged US$2.4 billion in federal grants to support the development of next-generation electric vehicles and batteries. The funds were allocated as follows: $1.5 billion in grants to U.S.-based manufacturers to produce highly efficient batteries and their components; up to $500 million in grants to U.S.-based manufacturers to produce other components needed for electric vehicles, such as electric motors and other components; and up to $400 million to demonstrate and evaluate plug-in hybrids and other electric infrastructure concepts – like truck stop charging station, electric rail, and training for technicians to build and repair electric vehicles (greencollar jobs).

Considering that actual plug-in car sales were lower than initially expected, as of early 2013, several industry observers have concluded that Obama's one million goal was unattainable. U.S. cumulative plug-in sales since 2008 achieved the 500,000 unit milestone in August 2016. According to a July 2012 study by Pike Research, cumulative sales would reach the one million goal set by the Obama administration only in 2018, while other analysts agree that the goal could be achieved in 2018. Secretary of Energy, Ernest Moniz, said in January 2016 that the one million goal may not be reached until 2020. According to the Secretary purchases have fallen well below President Barack Obama's goal due to low gasoline prices, which had a negative impact on sales. Also improvements in battery technology are required as lowering battery costs is "absolutely critical" to boost electric vehicle sales.

In March 2018, a group of America's largest electric utilities sided with U.S. automakers and asked Congress to preserve the tax credit in order to support the continued growth of sales of electric vehicles. Currently, there are hundreds of thousands of electric vehicles on the road. However, the auto industry is approaching a point at which the tax incentives will begin to expire. According to Daily Energy Insider, "The utilities' efforts occur at a time when growth in electric sales is sluggish and electric companies see a possible opportunity to apply the latest battery technology to help serve their customers."

===== New plug-in electric vehicles =====
The Energy Improvement and Extension Act of 2008 granted tax credits for new qualified plug-in electric drive motor vehicles. The American Recovery and Reinvestment Act of 2009 (ARRA) also authorized federal tax credits for converted plug-ins, though the credit is lower than for new PEVs. American Clean Energy and Security Act of 2009 (ACES) also had extensive provisions for electric cars. The bill called for all electric utilities to, "develop a plan to support the use of plug-in electric drive vehicles, including heavy-duty hybrid electric vehicles". The bill also provides for "smart grid integration," allowing for more efficient, effective delivery of electricity to accommodate the additional demands of plug-in electric vehicles. Finally, the bill allows for the Department of Energy to fund projects that support the development of PEVs and smart grid technology and infrastructure.

As defined by the 2009 American Recovery and Reinvestment Act, a PEV is a vehicle which draws propulsion energy from a traction battery with at least 4 kWh of capacity and uses an offboard source of energy to recharge such battery. The tax credit for new plug-in electric vehicles is worth $2,500 plus $417 for each kilowatt-hour of battery capacity over 4 kWh, and the portion of the credit determined by battery capacity cannot exceed $5,000. Therefore, the maximum amount of the credit allowed for a new PEV is $7,500. Both the Nissan Leaf electric vehicle and the Chevrolet Volt plug-in hybrid, launched in December 2010, are eligible for the maximum $7,500 tax credit. The Toyota Prius Plug-in Hybrid, released in January 2012, was eligible for a $2,500 tax credit due to its smaller battery capacity of 5.2 kWh. All Tesla cars and Chevrolet Bolts were eligible for the $7,500 tax credit.

As granted by the 2009 ARRA, electric vehicles produced after 2010 are eligible for an IRS tax credit from $2,500 to $7,500. There are some limitations and rules however that go along with the applied tax credit from electric vehicles. When an electric vehicle is leased, the tax credit is held by the manufacturer offering the lease, not by the lessee. Other restrictions that affect PEV tax credit include limitation of credit for electric vehicles used in reselling purposes, terms requiring the vehicle to remain in the United States, and production by qualified sellers.

====== Phaseout ======
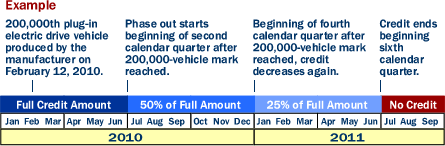
Example of phaseout

These granted tax credits on PEV vehicles will phase out once 200,000 plug-in vehicles are sold by each manufacturer in the U.S. During this phase out period after 200,000 plug-in car sales, qualified producers will experience a drop in a tax credit of $7,500 to $3,750 for the next 6 months followed by a drop to $1,875 for another 6 months until the credit is run out completely.

External images
- PEV tax credit development since 2011
- PEV tax credit development since 2016

The qualified plug-in electric vehicle credit phases out for a PEV manufacturer over the one-year period beginning with the second calendar quarter after the calendar quarter in which at least 200,000 qualifying vehicles from that manufacturer have been sold for use in the U.S. Cumulative sales started counting sales after December 31, 2009. After reaching the cap, qualifying PEVs for one quarter still earn the full credit, the second quarter after that quarter PEVS are eligible for 50% of the credit for six months, then 25% of the credit for another six months and finally the credit is phased out.

In July 2018, Tesla Inc. was the first plug-in manufacturer to pass 200,000 sales and the full tax credit was available until the end 2018, with the phase out beginning in January 2019. General Motors combined sales of plug-in electric vehicles passed 200,000 units in November 2018. The full tax credit was available until the end of March 2019 and thereafter reduced gradually until complete phase out beginning on April 1, 2020. As of January 2021, 21 vehicles have access to full tax credit, depending on taxpayer's conditions. Several plugin-vehicles are also approved for significant credits.

Federal tax credit sales numbers (As of 30 November 2018)
Carmaker	Cumulative sales (Oct 2020)	Date cap was reached
Tesla	~1,250,000	July 2018
General Motors	~203,941	Nov 2018
Nissan	126,875	
Ford	111,715	
Toyota	93,011	
BMW Group	79,679	

====== Studies ======
A 2013 study published in the journal Energy Policy determined that current federal subsidies are "not aligned with the goal of decreased gasoline consumption in a consistent and efficient manner." In particular, hybrid-vehicle credit is given according to battery capacity rather than on the vehicle's all-electric range. Across the battery-capacity and charging-infrastructure scenarios examined, the lowest-cost solution is for more drivers to switch to traditional hybrid electrics or low-capacity plug-in hybrid electric vehicles (PHEVs). Installing charging infrastructure would provide lower gasoline savings per dollar spent than paying for increased PHEV battery capacity.

A 2016 study conducted by researchers from the University of California, Davis found that the federal tax credit was the reason behind more than 30% of the plug-in electric sales. The impact of the federal tax incentive is higher among owners of the Nissan Leaf, with up to 49% of sales attributable to the federal incentive. The study, based on a stated preference survey of more than 2,882 plug-in vehicle owners in 11 states, also found that the federal tax credit shifts buyers from internal combustion engine vehicles to plug-in vehicles and advances the purchase timing of new vehicles by a year or more.

===== Plug-in conversion kits =====
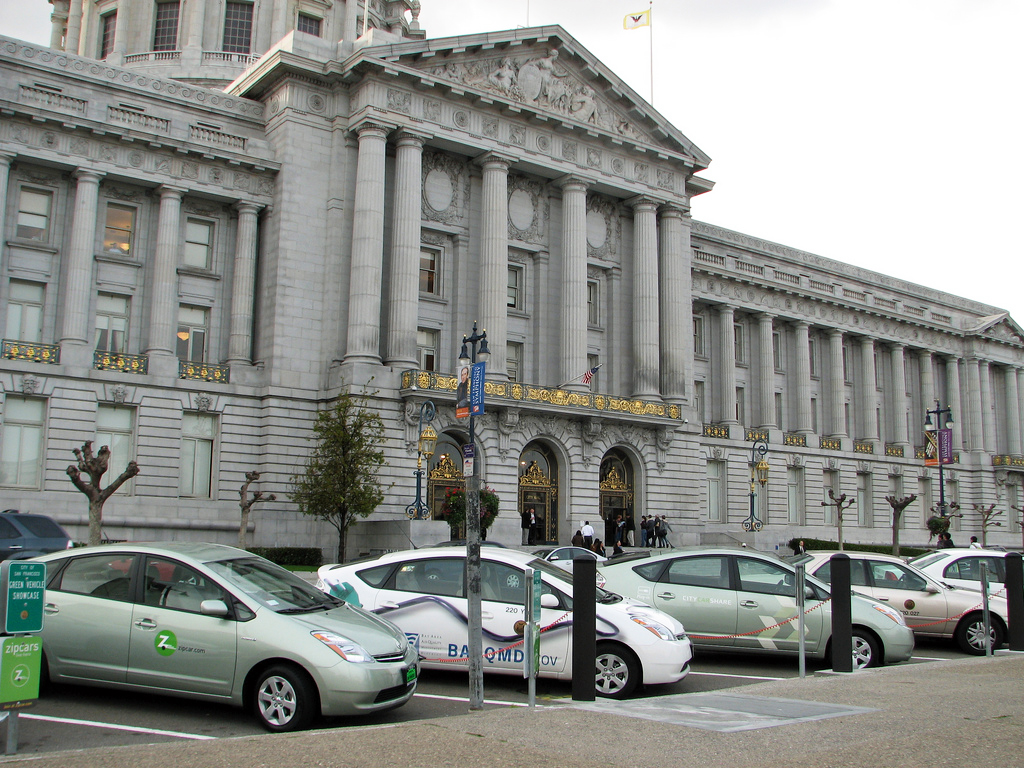
Plug-in electric drive conversion were also eligible for a maximum $4,000 federal tax credit. Shown here are normal Toyota Priuses that were converted to Plug-in hybrids recharging in San Francisco.

The 2009 ARRA provided a tax credit for plug-in electric drive conversion kits. The credit is equal to 10% of the cost of converting a vehicle to a qualified plug-in electric vehicle and in service after February 17, 2009. The maximum amount of the credit is $4,000. The credit does not apply to conversions made after December 31, 2011.

===== Charging equipment =====
Through 2010, there was a federal tax credit equal to 50% of the cost to buy and install a home-based charging station with a maximum credit of US$2,000 for each station. Businesses qualified for tax credits up to $50,000 for larger installations. These credits expired on December 31, 2010, but were extended through 2013 with a reduced tax credit equal to 30% with a maximum credit of up to US$1,000 for each station for individuals and up to US$30,000 for commercial buyers.

===== New proposals =====
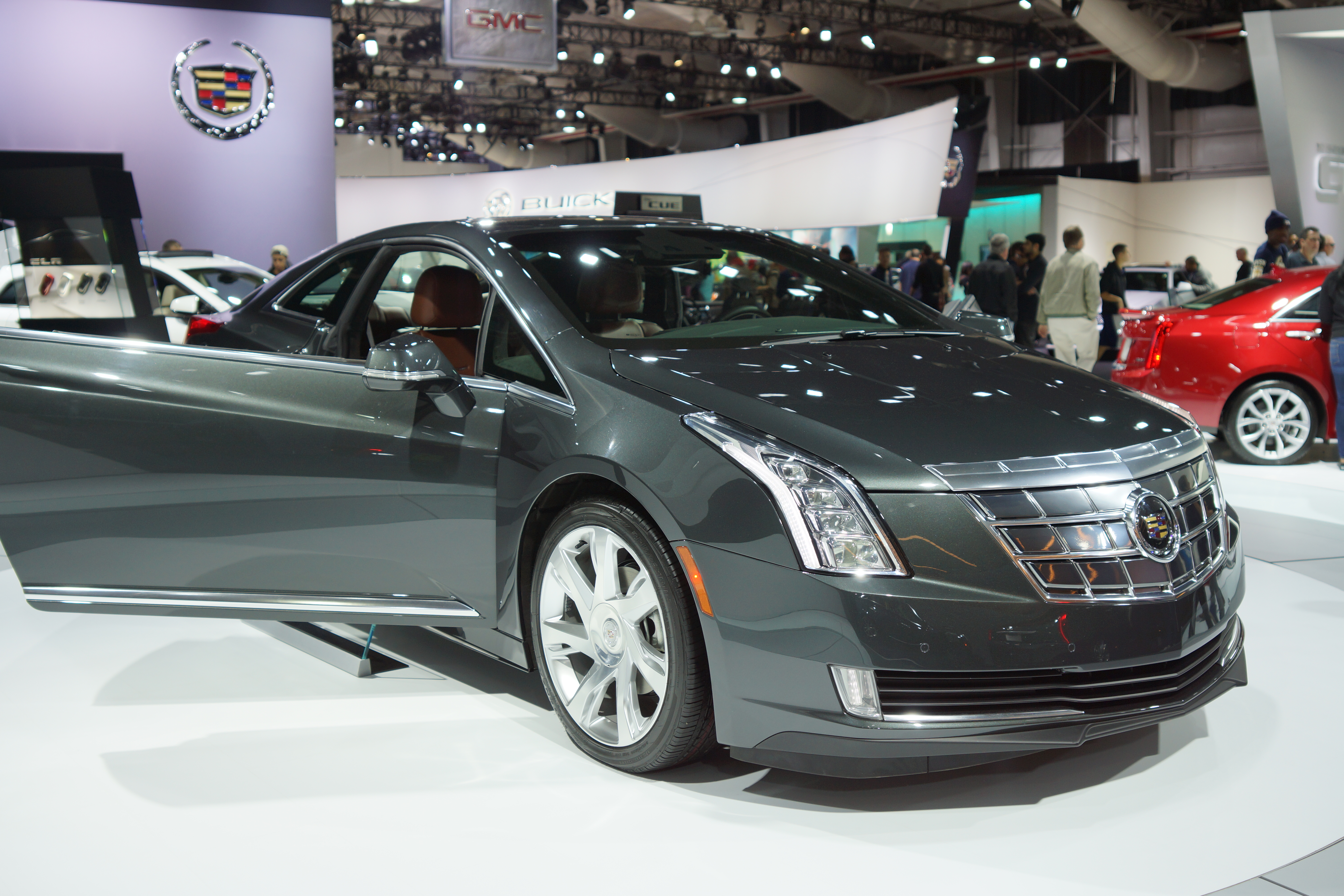
An initiative by the Obama administration to increase the maximum tax credit for plug-in electric vehicles to US$10,000 would not apply to luxury vehicles with a sales price of over US$45,000, such as the Cadillac ELR (shown) and the Tesla Model S.

Two separate initiatives were pursued in 2011 to transform the tax credit into an instant cash rebate; these did not pass. The objective of both initiatives was to make new qualifying plug-in electric cars more accessible to buyers by making the incentive more effective. The rebate would have been available at the point of sale allowing consumers to avoid a wait of up to a year to apply the tax credit against income tax returns. The first initiative was from Senator Debbie Stabenow who reintroduced the "Charging America Forward Act." This bill was introduced in August 2010 but was not voted by the full Senate. The bill would have turned the tax credit into a rebate worth up to US$7,500 for plug-in electric vehicles and also would have provided businesses with a tax credit for purchasing medium or heavy duty plug-in hybrid trucks. The other initiative was from the Obama administration and was submitted in the FY2012 Budget as a provision to transform the existing credit into a rebate that would have been claimable by dealers and passed along to the consumers, this was not included in the Budget.

Another change plug-in tax credit was proposed by Senator Carl Levin and Representative Sander Levin who proposed to raise the existing cap on the number of plug-in vehicles eligible for the tax credit. The proposal would have raised that limit from the existing 200,000 PEVs per manufacturer to 500,000 units, this was not passed.

In March 2014 the Obama administration included a provision in the FY2015 Budget to increase the maximum tax credit for plug-in electric vehicles and other advanced vehicles to US$10,000. However, the new maximum tax credit would not apply to luxury vehicles with a sales price of over US$45,000, which would be capped at US$7,500. The proposal sought to remove the 200,000 vehicle cap per manufacturer after which the credit phases out over a year. Instead, the incentives would begin to phase out – falling to 75% of the current credit – starting in 2019 for all manufacturers, and would be completely phased out by 2022; this did not get included in the Budget.

In November 2017, House Republicans proposed scrapping the $7,500 tax credit as part of a sweeping tax overhaul, but the final bill passed left the credit intact.

===== Inflation Reduction Act =====
In August 2022, President Joe Biden signed into law the Inflation Reduction Act, which made major changes in existing credits and created several new incentives. The $7,500 Section 30D tax credit for was separated into two $3,750 credits that could be claimed depending on where each vehicle model's critical minerals and battery components were produced, respectively. A new $4,000 Section 25E tax credit for pre-owned electric vehicles, where sellers of the pre-owned vehicle must file a time-of-sale "Clean Vehicle Seller" report to the IRS (Form 15400). The Act also provided a $7,500 tax credit for commercial vehicles weighing under 14,000 pounds and $40,000 for vehicles weighing over this amount under a new Section 45W tax credit.

===== One Big Beautiful Bill Act =====
In July 2025, President Donald Trump signed into law the One Big Beautiful Bill Act, which ended the federal tax credit for both new and used vehicles starting on September 30, 2025.

==== In California ====
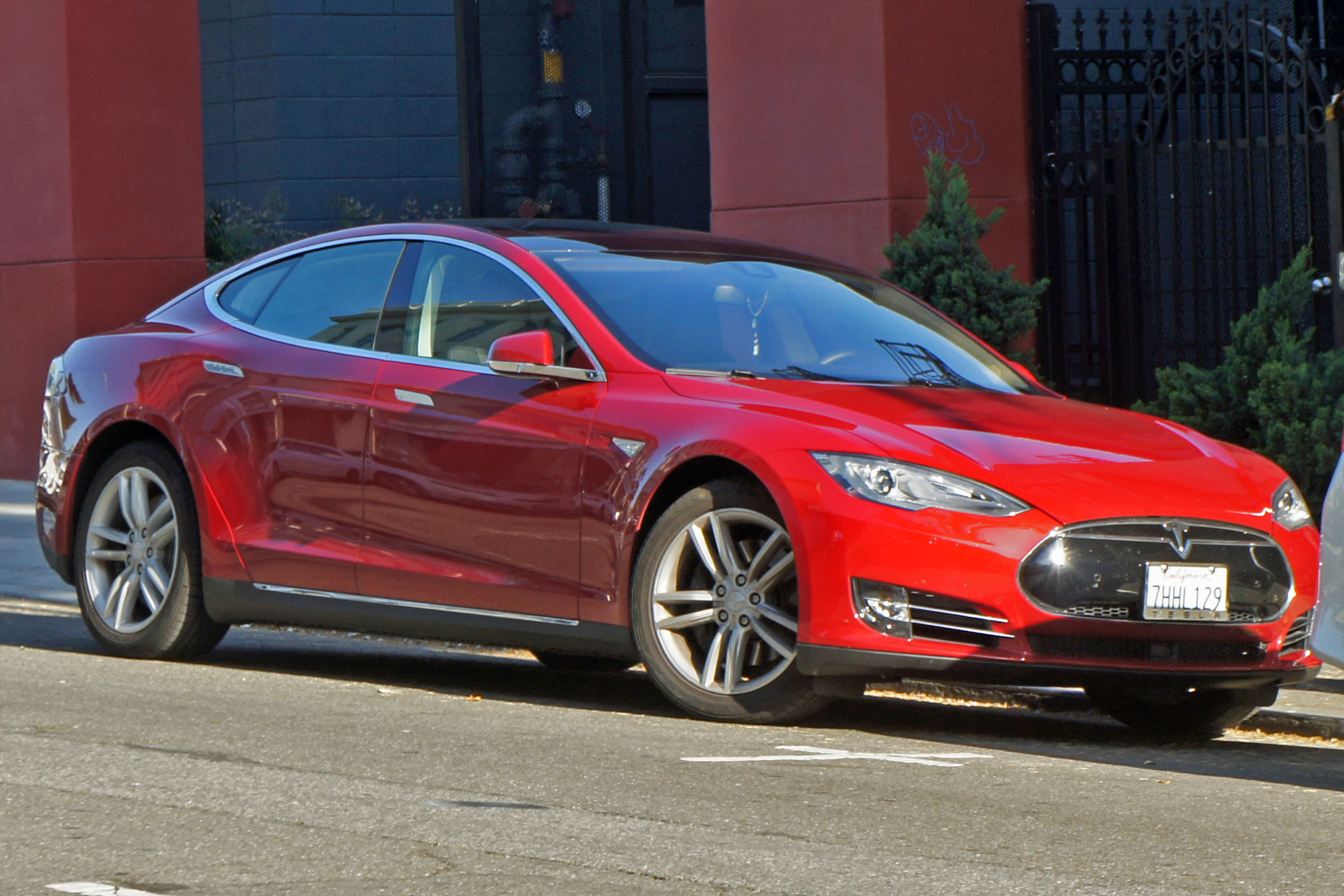
The Tesla Model S is eligible for a US$7,500 federal tax credit and a rebate in California, depending on income.

The Clean Vehicle Rebate Project (CVRP), initially funded with a total of US$4.1 million by the California Environmental Protection Agency's Air Resources Board (ARB), was established in order to promote the production and use of zero-emission vehicles (ZEVs), including plug-in electric and fuel cell vehicles. The program was created from Assembly Bill 118 that was signed by Governor Schwarzenegger in October 2007. The funding is provided on a first-come, first-served basis, and the project is expected to go through 2015.

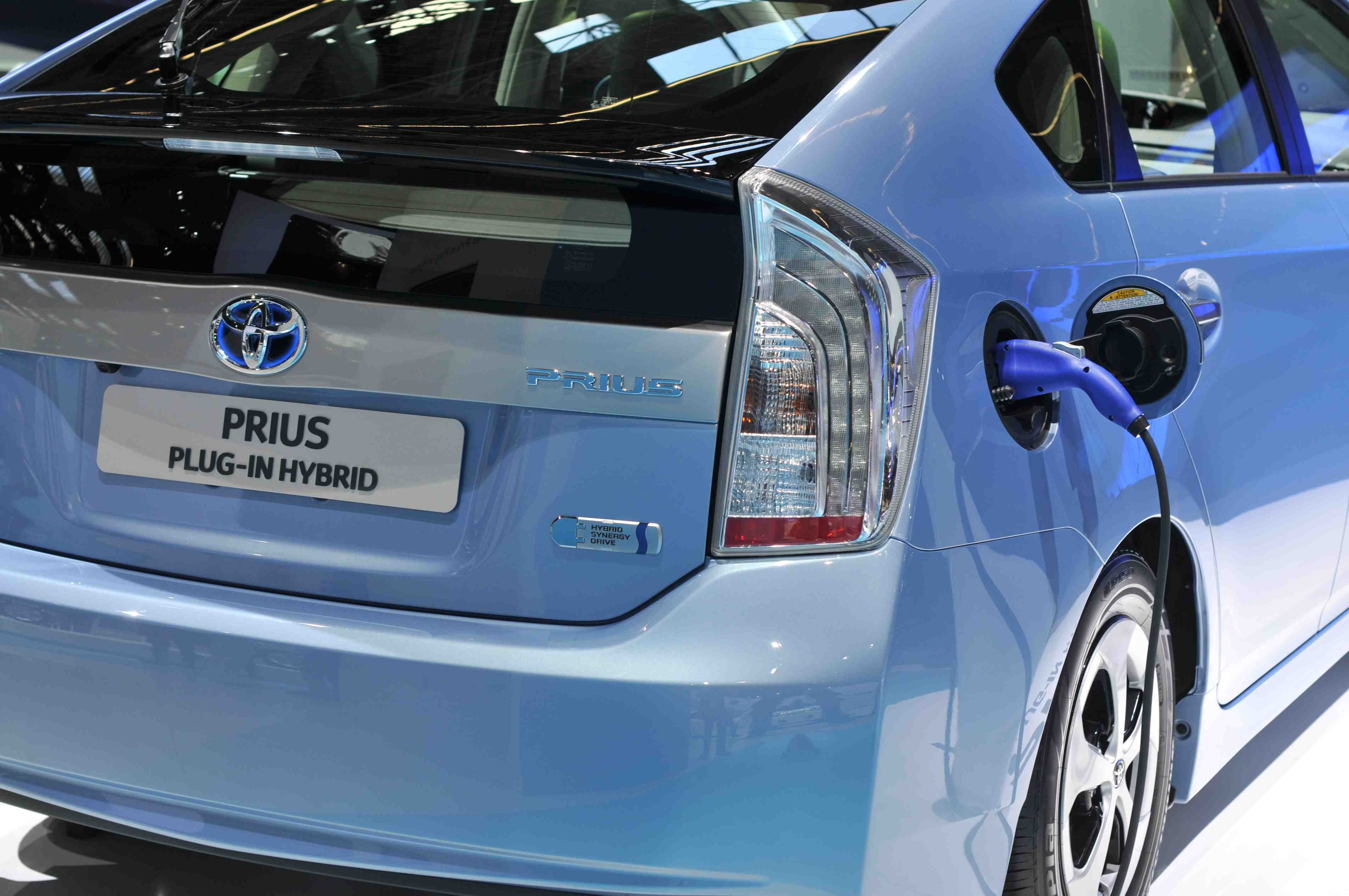
Besides a US$2,500 federal tax credit, the Toyota Prius Plug-in Hybrid is eligible for a rebate in California, depending on income.

Eligible vehicles include only new ARB-certified or approved zero-emission or plug-in hybrid electric vehicles. A list of eligible vehicles can be found on the California Center for Sustainable Energy web site. Among the eligible vehicles are neighborhood electric vehicles, battery electric, plug-in hybrid electric, and fuel cell vehicles including cars, trucks, medium- and heavy-duty commercial vehicles, and zero-emission motorcycles. Vehicles must be purchased or leased on or after March 15, 2010. Rebates of up to $5,000 per light-duty vehicle are available for individuals and business owners who purchase or lease new eligible vehicles. Certain zero-emission commercial vehicles are also eligible for rebates up to $20,000.

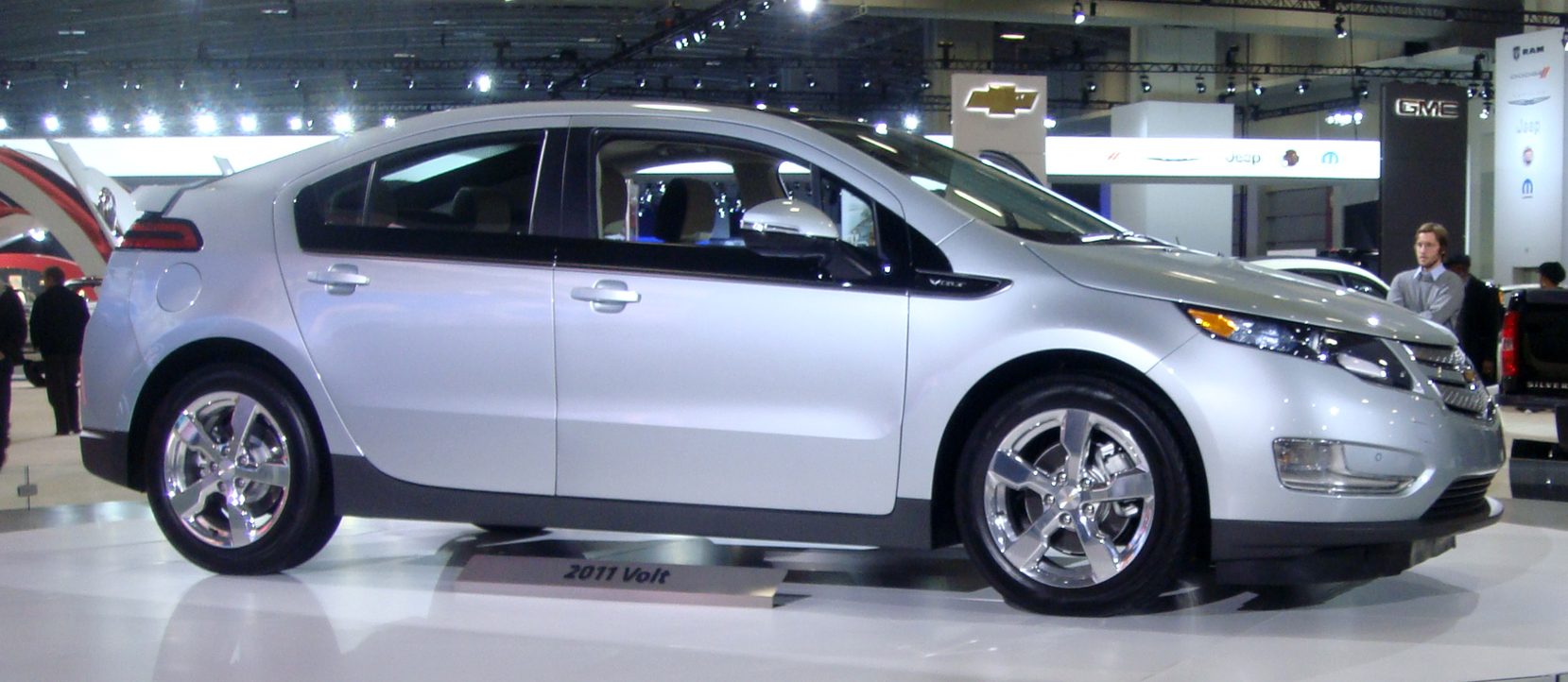
The 2012 Chevrolet Volt fitted with a low emissions package qualified in California for the US$1,500 CVRP rebate and had free access to high-occupancy vehicle lanes.

As of early September 2012, private individuals accounted for 88% of rebate funds reimbursed. As of early March 2013, CARB has issued about 18,000 rebates totaling US$41 million. However, CARB notices that approximately 2,300 Chevrolet Volts were sold in California before the Volt became eligible for the rebate in February 2012. As a result of the rebate and other existing incentives, such as allowing solo drivers in HOV lanes, California is the leading PEV market in the United States with about 40% of all new plug-in electric vehicles sold nationwide during 2011 and 2012, while the state represents about 10% of all new car sales in the country.

As of 10 March 2014, a total of 52,264 clean vehicle rebates have been issued by the CVRP, for a total of US$110,222,866 disbursed, with only US$3.8 million remaining for fiscal year 2013–2014. As of April 2014, the CVRP was facing an estimated US$30 million funding shortfall for the 2013-14 fiscal year, and uncertainty about additional funding for the 2014-15 fiscal year. CARB staff presented a proposal to the board to overcome the funding shortage and also to facilitate the rebates to benefit buyers in disadvantaged communities who live in areas with bad air quality or who can't afford high-end electric cars.

A bill signed into law in September 2014, mandated the CARB to draft a financial plan to meet California's goal of putting one million vehicles on the road while making sure that disadvantaged communities can participate. CARB had to change the Clean Vehicle Rebate program to provide an extra credit for low-income drivers who wish to purchase or lease an electric car. CARB also provides assistance to carsharing programs in low-income neighborhoods and install charging stations in apartment buildings in those communities. Under bill SB 1275, low-income residents who agree to scrap older, polluting cars will also get a clean vehicle rebate on top of existing payments for junking smog-producing vehicles.

Another bill signed into law in September 2014, AB 1721, grants clean air vehicles free or reduced rates in high-occupancy toll lanes (HOT) lanes. AB 2565 facilitates access to charging stations by requiring commercial and residential property owners to approve installation if the charging station meets requirements and complies with the owner's process for approving a modification to the property.

As of 29 March 2016, California added income-based caps to its rebate system. Buyers with incomes less than 300% of the Federal poverty level will get up to US$3,000 for a plug-in hybrid, US$4,000 for an all-electric car, and US$6,500 for a hydrogen fuel-cell car and the rebate scales down until Californian buyers with incomes over US$250,000 are no longer are eligible for incentives on hybrids or electric cars, however can get US$5,000 for a hydrogen fuel-cell car. As of March 2016, the Center for Sustainable Energy has issued more than $291 million in the CVRP for over 137,200 vehicles since 2010. As of November 2023 California city officials said they will offer qualifying low-income residents up to $4,000 to buy used electric vehicles and will build a network of fast chargers in underserved neighborhoods after a new report concluded that low-income individuals are being left behind in the transition to clean energy.

The income-base caps went into effect on 1 November 2016. Residents will not be eligible for rebates if their gross annual income exceeds US$150,000 for single tax filers, US$204,000 for head of household filers and US$300,000 for joint filers. These limits do not apply to the purchase of fuel cell electric vehicles, which represent less than 1% of rebate applications.

The standard tax credits (on eligible cars) are $1,500 for plug-in hybrids, $2,500 for all-electrics, and $5,000 for fuel cell cars.

===== Access to HOV lanes =====
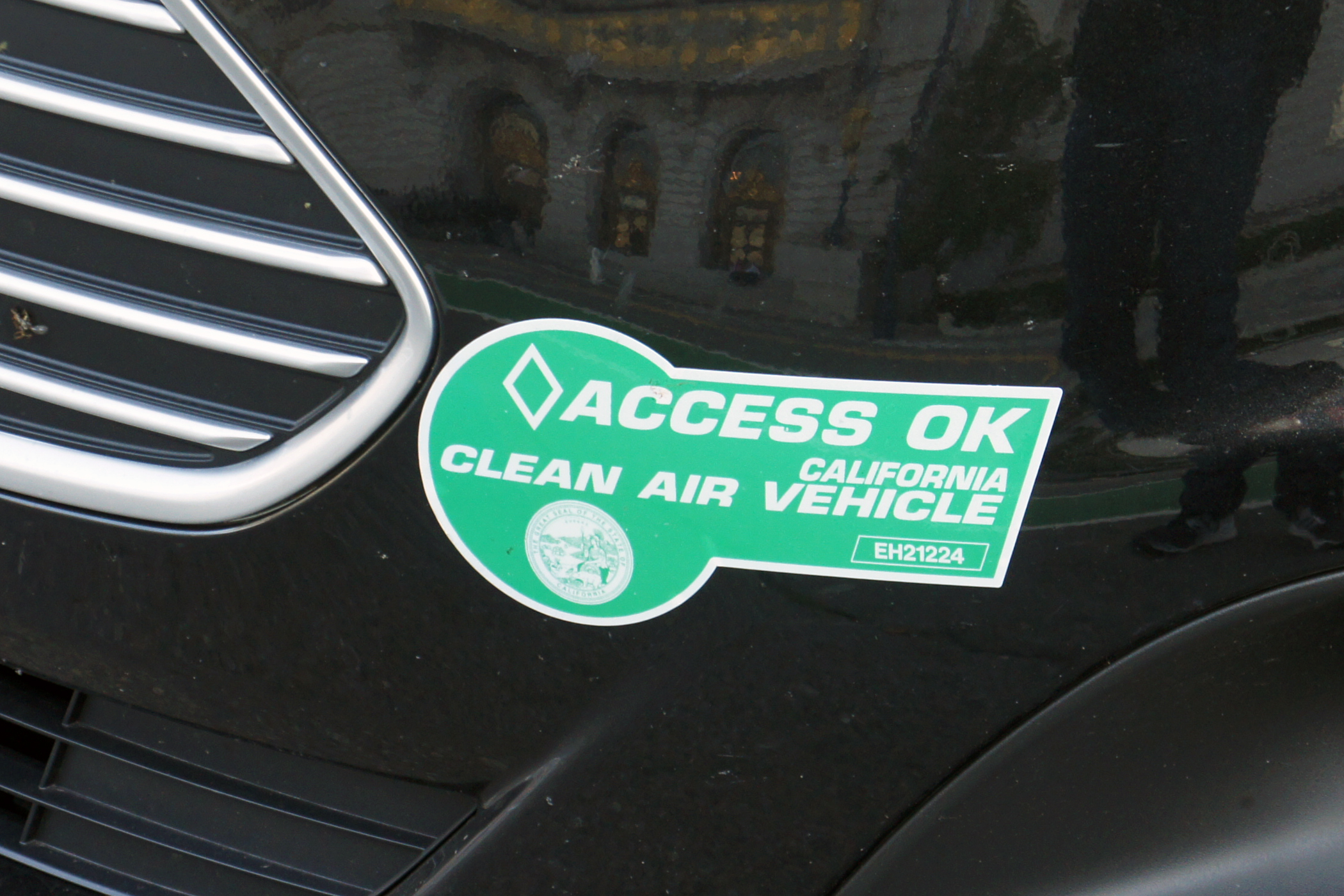
California's green Clean Air Vehicle sticker for plug-in hybrids (expired in 1/1/2019)

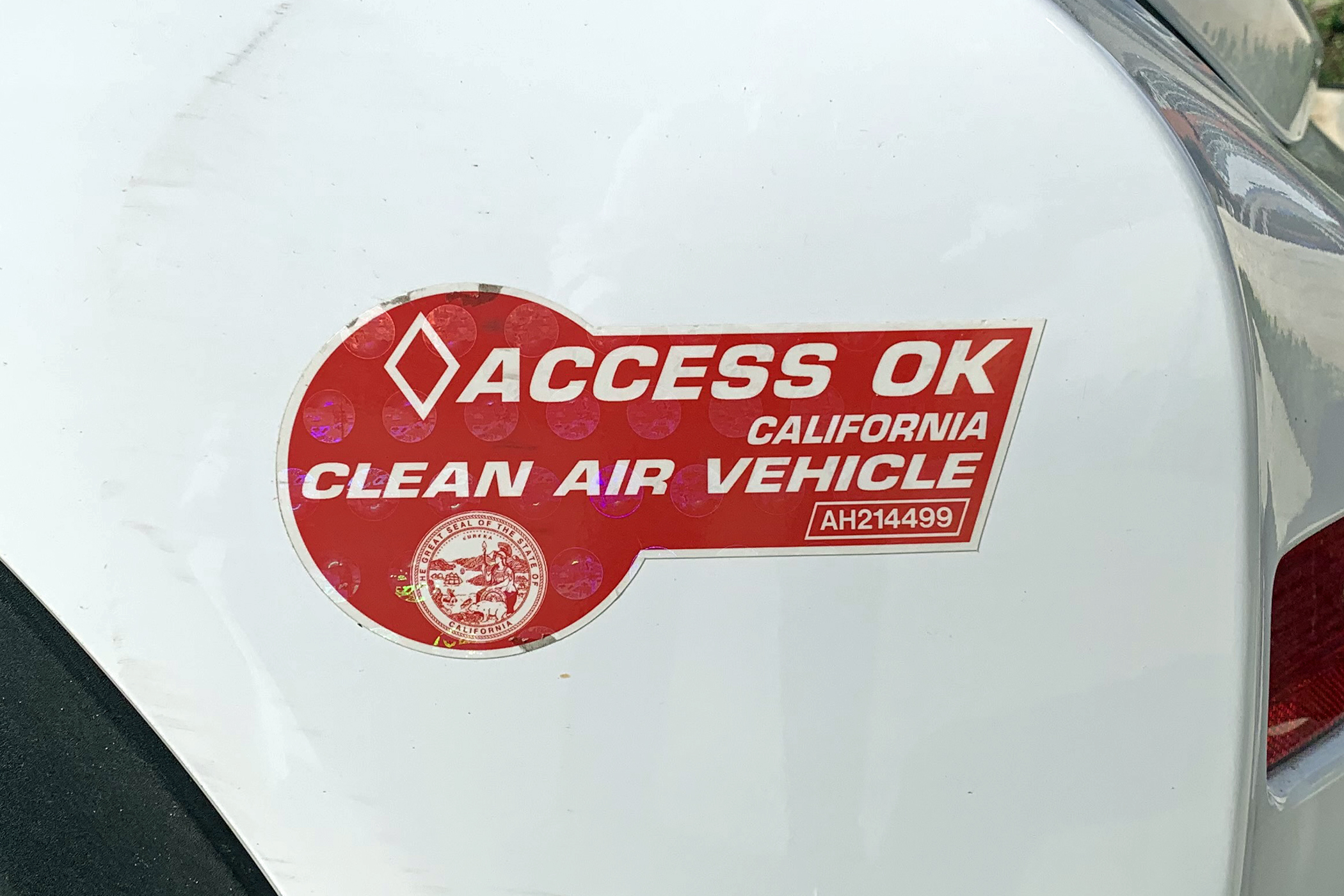
California's red Clean Air Vehicle sticker for all-electric cars (expires in 1/1/2022)

In 2000, California began issuing Clean Air Vehicle (CAV) decals to vehicles that met specified emissions standards, allowing them to be operated by a single occupant in California's high-occupancy vehicle lanes (HOV), or carpool or diamond lanes. All-electric vehicles that were classified as Federal Inherently Low Emission Vehicles (ILEVs) or zero emissions vehicles were entitled to an unlimited number of white CAV stickers. Green CAV stickers were initially available to a limited number of applicants that purchased or leased cars meeting California's Enhanced Advanced Technology Partial Zero Emission Vehicle (Enhanced AT PZEV) or Transitional Zero-Emission Vehicle (TZEV) requirements, for which plug-in hybrids classify. The green car sticker cap was increased several times, and in September 2016 the cap was removed. The decal program was contingent on federal law, last amended by the 2015 Fixing America's Surface Transportation Act, that allowed such a program on the HOV lanes of federal and state highways. When the US Congress did not change part of the law that had an end date, September 30, 2025, California stopped the CAV decal program as well.

Research performed in 2015 by the UCLA Luskin Center for Innovation found that access to HOV lanes has a significant impact on plug-in car sales. Researchers linked automobile sales to a sample of more than 7,000 of the 8,057 census tracts in California for the study, including Los Angeles, Sacramento, San Diego and San Francisco. The study concluded that the ability to use potentially time-saving HOV lanes prompted the purchase of more than 24,000 plug-in electric cars and hybrids in the four urban areas from 2010 to 2013, or about 40% of the total of such vehicles. The UCLA researcher concluded that without the policy giving plug-in vehicles access to HOV lanes, total plug-in sales in the same study areas would have been only 36,692 for the three-year period.

==== All states ====
As of November 2014, 37 states and Washington, D.C., had established incentives and tax exemptions for BEVs and PHEVs, or utility-rate breaks, and other non-monetary incentives such as free parking and high-occupancy vehicle lane access. All states are eligible for the $7,500 income tax credit.

== Oceania ==
=== Australia ===
==== Federal incentives ====
An Australian National Electric Vehicle Strategy was set to be released by mid-2021 by the Federal coalition government.

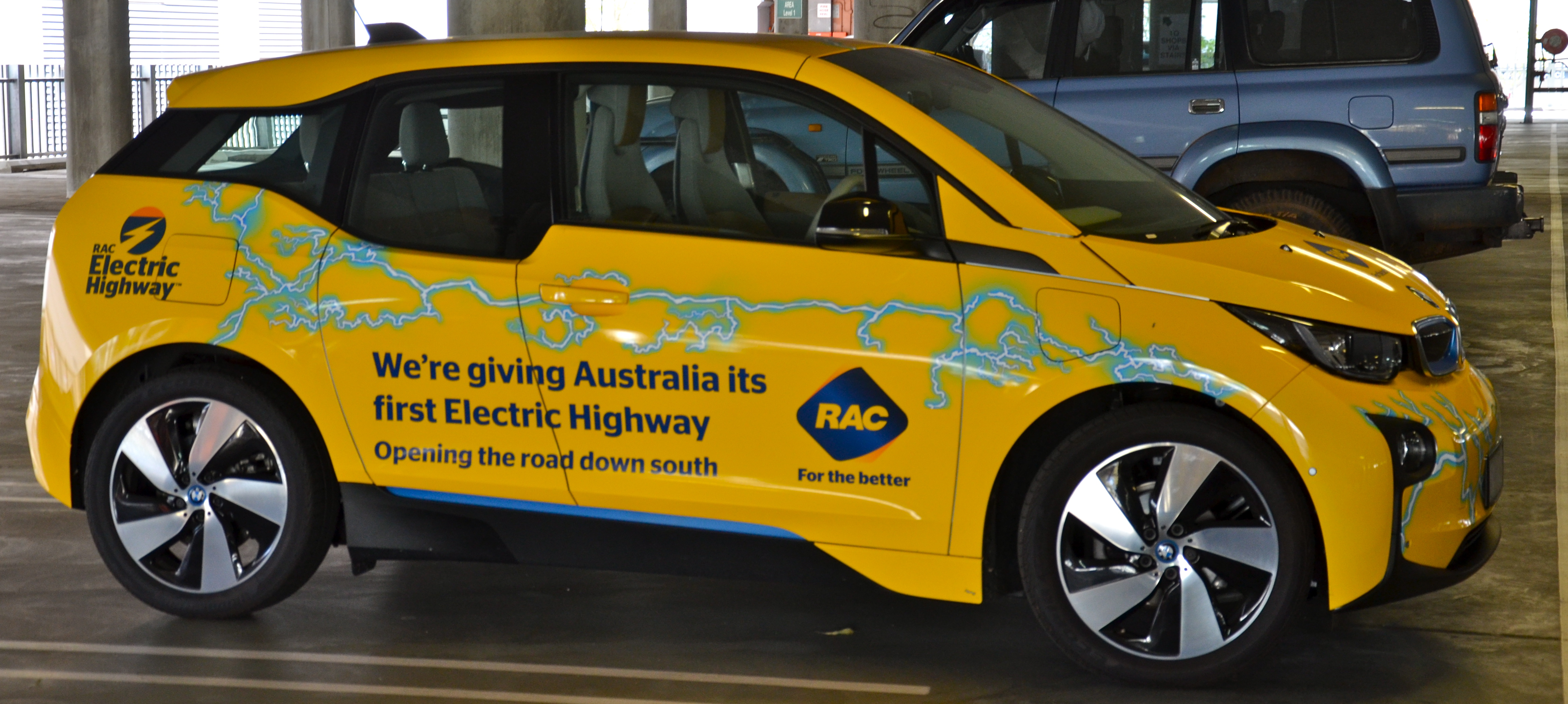
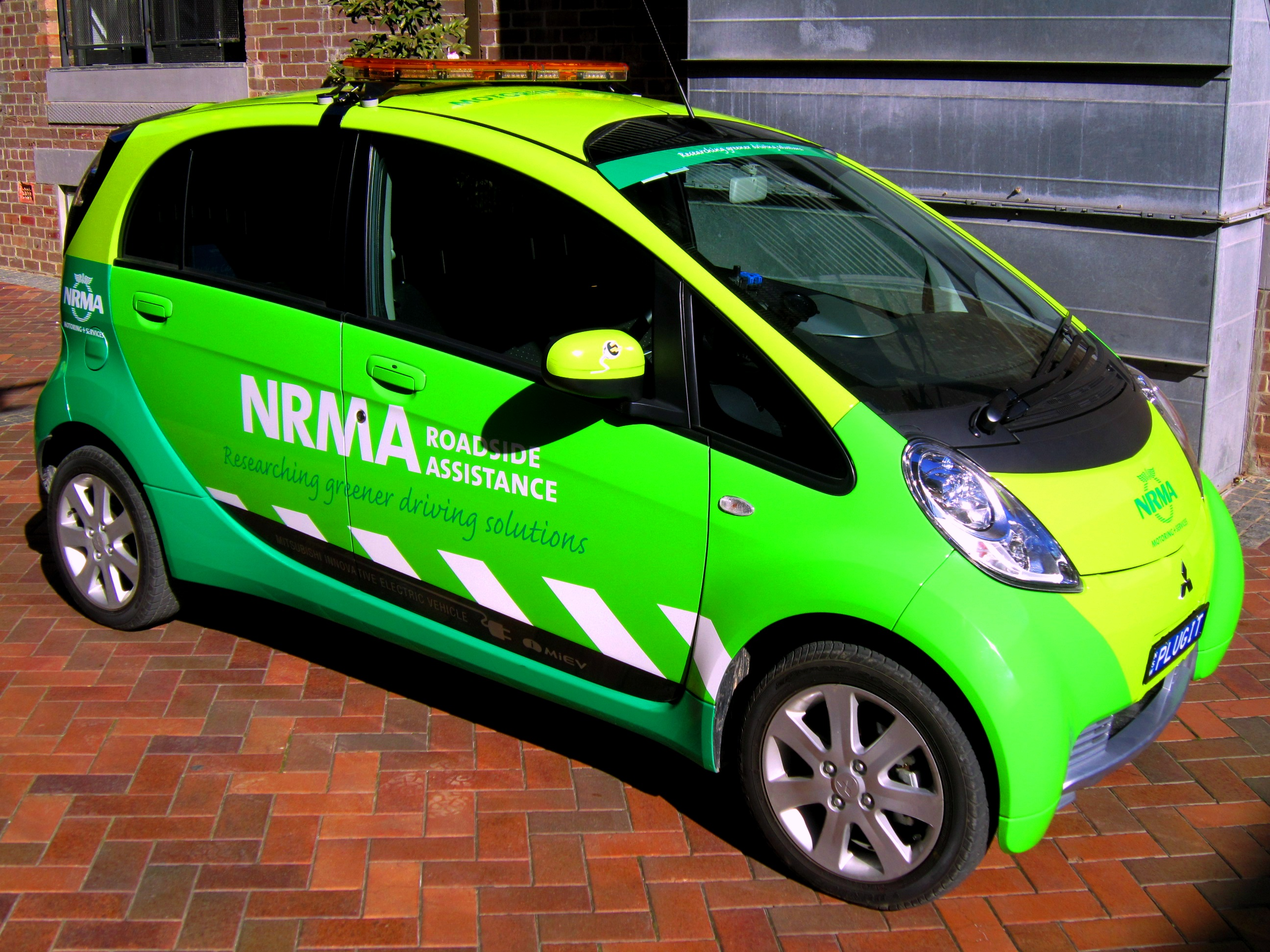
Driver assistance vehicles operated by the Royal Automobile Club of Western Australia (left, BMW i3) and the NRMA (right, Mitsubishi i MiEV)

Fuel efficient vehicles attract less Luxury Car Tax, leading to a saving of up to $2,648. In 2021, the Luxury Car Tax threshold is $69,152 for fuel efficient vehicles and $79,659 for full electric vehicles BEVs. However, Australia's largest states of Victoria and New South Wales, and the Australian Capital Territory, are exempt from the Luxury Car Tax. The Federal Government has also committed to an industry-wide review of petrol and diesel standards in 2021. Euro 6 petrol and diesel standards are currently planned nationally in 2024.

In 2026, the Australian Government Clean Energy Finance Corporation partnered with Hyundai to offer discounted finances on certain Hyundai and Kia EVs which are priced below the luxury car tax threshold (2026 $91,387). Customers may save between 0.5% to 1.0% on financing rate which could save $1,900 in interest rates.

The Federal Government pledged to spend $74.5 million on charging infrastructure in the budget in 2021. The Federal Government is also contributing $15 million to a national electric vehicle charging network built by Evie Networks and connecting Melbourne, Canberra, Sydney, Adelaide and Brisbane.

A Federal Government target for 100% of car sales to be electric vehicles before 2050 could also be included in the Federal Government's National Electric Vehicle Strategy. This is due to the Prime Minister stating in 2021 that the government's goal is to reach net zero emissions by 2050, which would require a national transition to 100% electric vehicles before 2050. Moreover, 60% of Australians support a nationwide ban on petrol and diesel car sales by 2035.

==== State and Territory incentives ====
State government's offer significant electric vehicle incentives to ensure they meet their EV sales targets. Victoria aim for 50% of new car sales to be electric vehicles by 2030. The Government of South Australia also aim for 100% of new car sales to be electric vehicles by 2035. The NSW Government is also considering an official ban date for the sale of petrol and diesel vehicles.

===== Victoria =====
Victoria offers a subsidy of $3,000 - $5,000 for BEV cars under $68,740. Victorian EV, PHEV and hybrid drivers also pay a reduced rate of stamp duty and $100 off registration fees. Victoria's peak infrastructure advisory body recommended the removal of registration fees altogether for electric vehicles Victoria aim for 50% of new car sales to be electric vehicles/FCEVs by 2030. Ban of internal combustion-engine vehicles advised by peak infrastructure advisory body This will be presented to the Victorian Government in mid-2021

Victoria has created a $5 million innovation fund to increase commercial EV uptake A $3,000 BEV car rebate is available for 2 vehicles only per company. $46 million ZEV subsidy program, the first of its type in Australia, providing grants to people and businesses wanting to buy ZEVs, targeted at the supply of low to medium-priced vehicles. $5 million commercial sector ZEV Innovation Fund to encourage the uptake of ZEV light commercial vehicles in the commercial passenger vehicle, logistics, construction and service-sector industries. Police fleet will be 100% electric by 2029

All vehicles in Victoria are exempt from the Luxury Car Tax.

In 2021, Victoria introduced the world's first EV tax, charged as road user charges. Drivers pay 2c per km for PHEV, and 2.5c per km for BEV, paid annually upon registration renewal. This has been cited as the worst EV in the world and made Victoria the laughing stock of the EV community globally

===== Australian Capital Territory =====
ACT offers $15,000 interest free loans. ACT BEVs are also stamp duty exempt and there is a 20% reduction in registration fees with the first 2 years of registration free EVs exempt from stamp duty until June 2024 (new and second-hand EVs) Free registration available to converted EV's also (worth up to $1,200). ACT committed to allowing EVs to drive in transit lanes until 2023

Class B, C and D Green Vehicles pay reduced stamp duty.

All vehicles in ACT are exempt from the Luxury Car Tax.

===== South Australia =====
The South Australian Liberal government aim for 100% of new car sales to be electric vehicles by 2035

South Australian Government will contribute $5,000 or 50% towards residential and commercial EV charger purchases and installations Also 100% discounted parking for EVs. Taxis to be 100% electric vehicles by 2030 Ride share fleet to be 100% electric vehicles by 2030

===== New South Wales =====
New South Wales offer $250 discount from registration fees and NSW plan stamp duty exemption for EVs saving $1,200 - $18,000 NSW plan to allow EVs in transit lane. NSW plan to subsidize parking. Ban of internal combustion-engine vehicles planned in NSW.

All vehicles in NSW are exempt from the Luxury Car Tax.

===== Tasmania =====
EVs exempt from stamp duty until 2023. Car rental companies exempt from registration fees on new and used EVs Tasmania offer grants for public and business electric charging stations.

===== Queensland =====
EVs pay $660 less stamp duty than other vehicles Queensland electric and hybrid vehicles pay a lower stamp duty of 2 per cent. 50% discounted parking for EVs.

===== Northern Territory =====
NT EVs only pay the small car category for registration ($665.55 a year) irrelevant of size

=== New Zealand ===
In June 2021, the New Zealand government announced a "feebate" scheme, by which electric vehicles would be subsidised, while particularly high-emitting ICE vehicles would have a cost added to them. The scheme is intended to be revenue-neutral, so that the fees on high-emitting vehicles would pay for the rebates on electric ones. The rebate system began operation on 1 July 2021, with the fee part originally intended to begin on 1 January 2022 (although this has since been delayed to 1 April 2022). This came after a 2019 proposal for a feebate was seemingly vetoed by the minority coalition member New Zealand First.

26,000 EVs were registered in New Zealand in 2020 and the government have a target of an additional 60,000 electric vehicles on New Zealand roads by 2023.

All government vehicles and the national bus fleet are required to be electric in the future with New Zealand mandating that all government agencies must only purchase electric vehicles in 2020 to ensure one-third of the fleet is electric by 2023.

== South America ==
=== Ecuador ===
In Ecuador, all electric vehicles are exempt from customs duties and taxes starting in June 2019. The electric vehicle offer in the country is set to increase. The Ecuadorean government has been incentivizing the use of electric vehicles with tax cuts. However, both the offer and demand remained short, encouraging the government to eliminate all duties to electric vehicles.

== Africa ==
=== Morocco ===
Electric and hybrid vehicles are exempt from customs duties since 2017.

=== South Africa ===
Electric vehicles pay a 25% duty, this is 7% higher than fossil fuel vehicles from the EU that only pay 18%. Beyond this disincentive, there are no incentives or advantages for EV ownership in South Africa.

== Criticism ==
Some experts have criticized the government incentivization of private electric cars. Transport researchers Dr. Israel Fabian and Prof. Dick Ettema have found that while government incentives can assist in lowering overall carbon emissions, such incentives lead to unequal distribution of resources which can lead to social exclusion and transportation burdens on certain populations.

== See also ==
- Electric car use by country
- Phase-out of fossil fuel vehicles
- Government incentives for fuel efficient vehicles in the United States
- Hybrid tax credit
- List of modern production plug-in electric vehicles
- Plug In America
