= Automobile Information Disclosure Act of 1958 =

Automobile Information Disclosure Act
- Long title: An Act to require the full and fair disclosure of certain information in connection with the distribution of new automobiles in commerce, and for other purposes
- Enacted by: the 85th United States Congress

Citations
- Public law: 85-506

Legislative history
- Introduced in the Senate as S. 3500 by Mike Monroney (D-OK) on March 17, 1958; Committee consideration by Interstate and Foreign Commerce; Passed the Senate on May 14, 1958; Signed into law by President Dwight D. Eisenhower on July 7, 1958

The Automobile Information Disclosure Act of 1958, 15 U.S.C. §§ 1231–1233, was passed in June 1958 by Congress and took effect in January 1959. It was sponsored by Oklahoma Senator Mike Monroney, after whom the resulting "Monroney sticker" was named.

The law has been amended and now requires that all new automobiles carry a sticker on a window containing important information about the vehicle, including:

- The manufacturer's suggested retail price (MSRP)
- Engine and transmission specifications
- Standard equipment and warranty details
- Optional equipment and pricing
- City and highway fuel economy ratings, as determined by the Environmental Protection Agency
