= Monroney sticker =

Automobile label in the United States

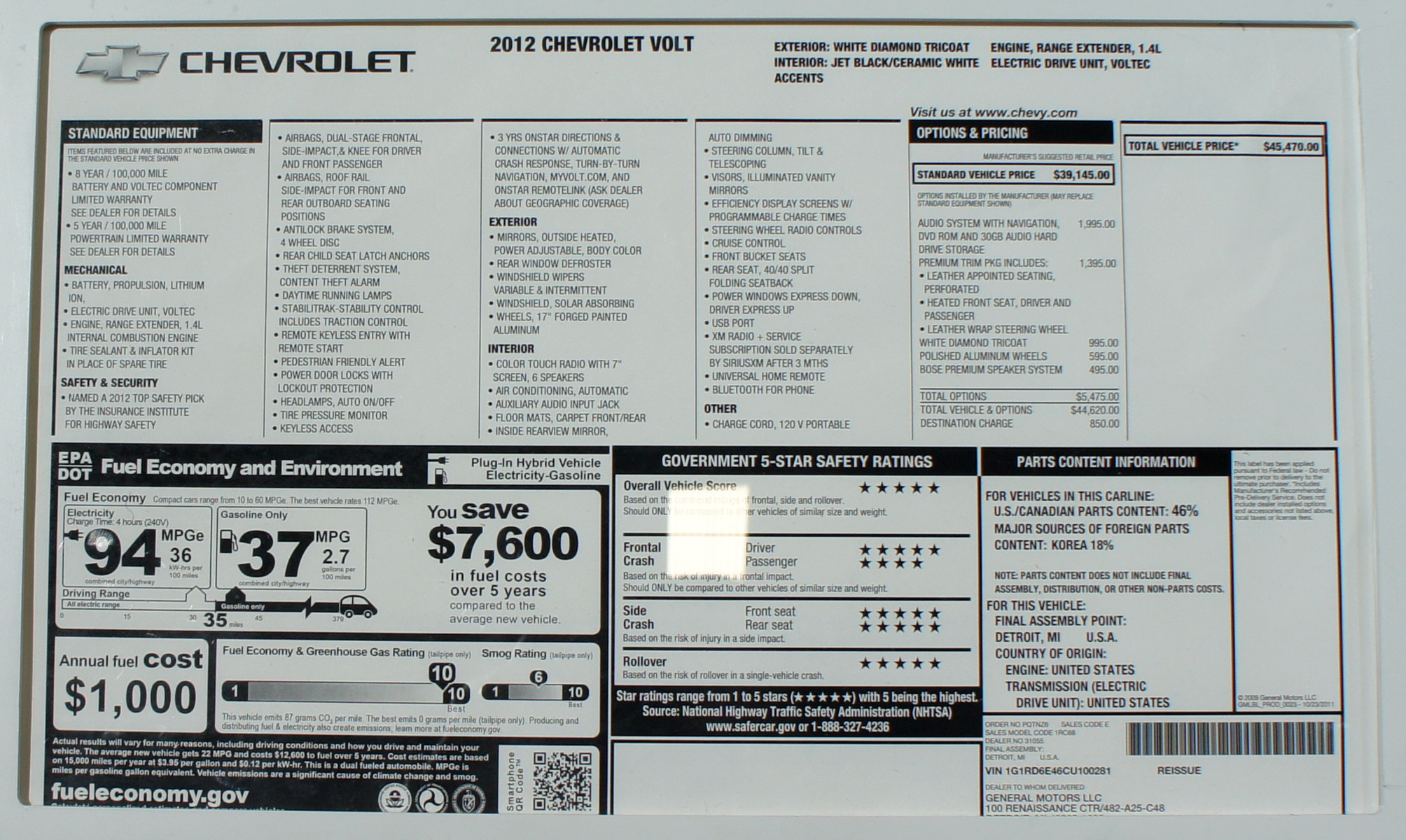
Complete Monroney sticker for the 2012 Chevrolet Volt plug-in hybrid

The Monroney sticker or window sticker is a label required in the United States to be displayed in all new automobiles. It includes the listing of certain official information about the car. The window sticker was named after Almer Stillwell "Mike" Monroney, a United States Senator from Oklahoma who sponsored the bill that resulted in the label mandate.

== History ==
In 1955, Senator Mike Monroney chaired a subcommittee of the Senate Interstate and Foreign Commerce Committee that investigated complaints from car dealerships in the United States about abusive treatment by manufacturers.

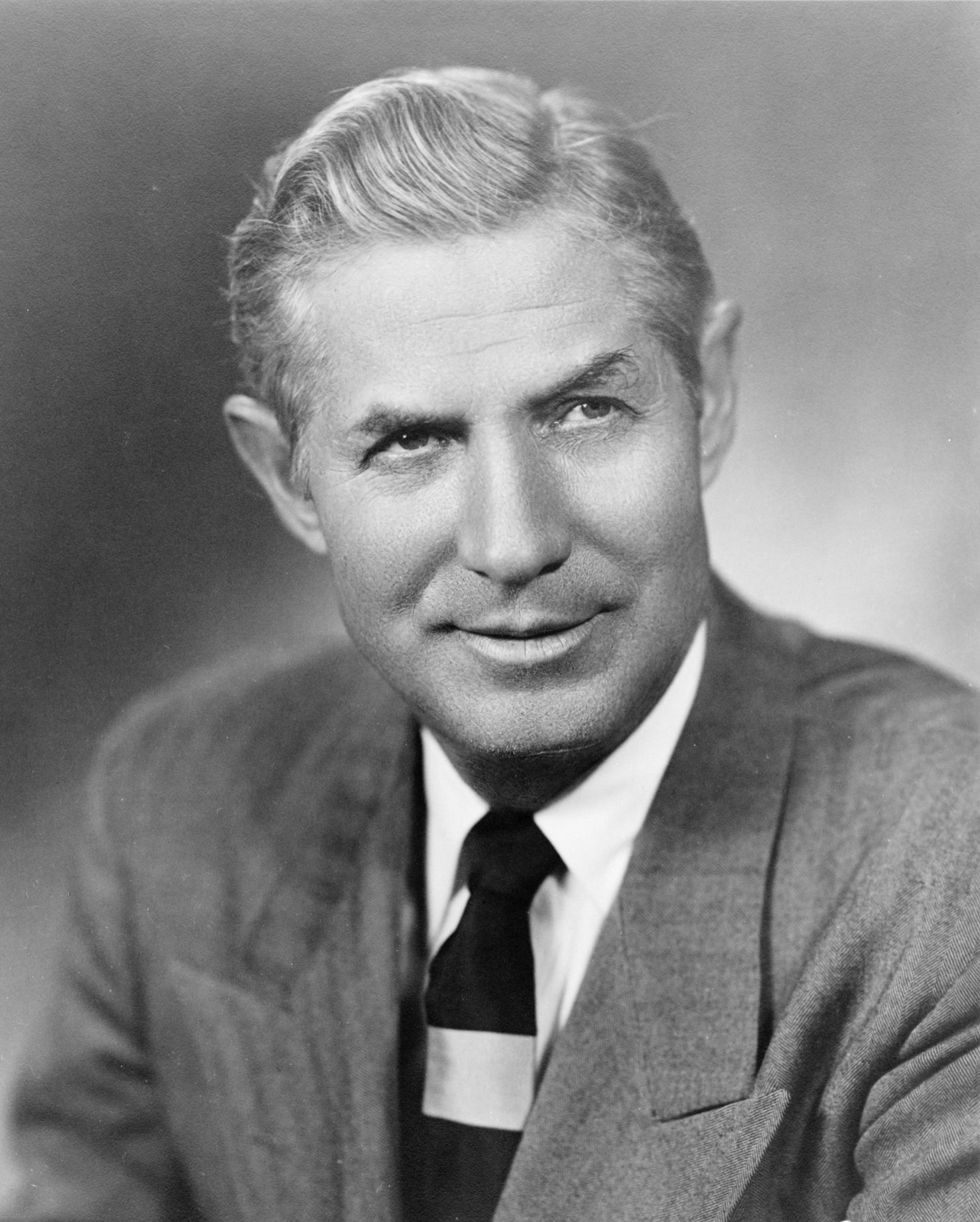
Senator Mike Monroney, for whom the Monroney Sticker is named.

The subcommittee continued working and investigated deceptive practices by car dealerships. Since there was no price disclosed on each car, dealers could inflate the manufacturer's suggested retail price to give the impression that buyers received a significant discount allowance or higher value for the used car they traded. There were also hidden fees and nonessential costs that some dealers added while consumers lacked price information, a listing of options, and the destination charges when shopping for new cars.

Monroney sponsored the Automobile Information Disclosure Act of 1958, which mandated the disclosure of information about the car, its equipment, and pricing for all new automobiles sold in the United States. The act does not apply to vehicles with a gross vehicle weight rating (GVWR) of more than 8,500 pounds (3,856 kg).

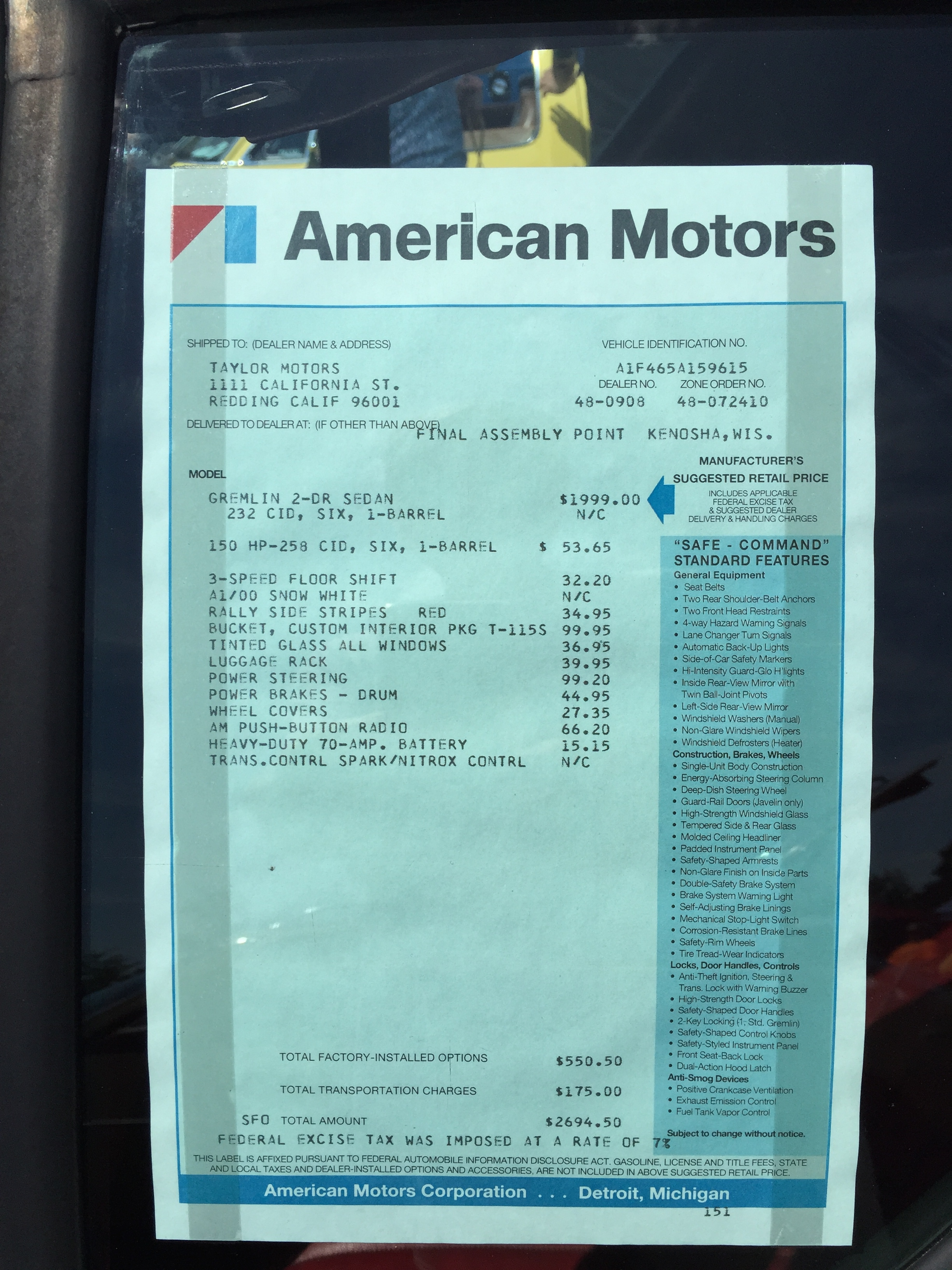
An original 1971 American Motors window sticker listing standard and optional equipment

Since the mid-1970s, the United States Environmental Protection Agency has provided fuel economy metrics on the label to help consumers choose more fuel-efficient vehicles.

New requirements for the Monroney label were issued, starting with 2008 model-year cars and light-duty trucks sold in the United States. This was included in the 2007 Energy Independence and Security Act (EISA) that mandated the inclusion of additional information about fuel efficiency as well as ratings on each vehicle's greenhouse gas emissions and other air pollutants.

A more comprehensive fuel economy and environment label was mandatory beginning in model year 2013, though some carmakers voluntarily adopted it in 2012. The new window sticker includes specific labels for alternative fuel and alternative propulsion vehicles available in the U.S. market, such as plug-in hybrids, electric vehicles, flexible-fuel vehicles, hydrogen fuel cell vehicles, and natural gas vehicles.

The new label allows consumers to compare alternative-fuel and advanced-technology-powered vehicles with conventional internal combustion engine vehicles using miles per gallon of gasoline equivalent (MPGe) as a metric. Other information includes greenhouse gas and smog emissions ratings, fuel cost estimates over the next five years, and a QR Code that a smartphone can scan for users to access additional online information.

== Label contents ==
The Monroney sticker must be affixed to the side window or windshield by the manufacturer before shipment of new vehicles to the dealer for sale in the United States, and it can only be removed by the consumer (Chapter 28, Sections 1231–1233, Title 15 of the United States Code). A fine of up to US$1,000 per vehicle for each offense is authorized if the sticker is missing, and other fees and penalties are authorized if the sticker is altered illegally (including imprisonment).

The sticker must include the following information:

- Make, model, trim, and serial number
- The manufacturer's suggested retail price (MSRP)
- Engine and transmission specifications
- Standard equipment and warranty details
- Optional equipment and pricing
- Transportation charges for shipment to the dealer

The statute has been amended to include:

- City and highway fuel economy ratings, as determined by the Environmental Protection Agency (EPA)
- As of September 2007, crash test ratings as determined by the National Highway Traffic Safety Administration

== Redesigned fuel economy label ==
The introduction of advanced-technology vehicles in the United States coincided with the 2007 Energy Independence and Security Act (EISA), which required new information to be incorporated into the Monroney label for new cars and light-duty trucks, such as ratings for fuel economy, greenhouse gas emissions, and other air pollutants. The U.S. Environmental Protection Agency and the National Highway Traffic Safety Administration (NHTSA) conducted a series of studies to determine the best way to redesign this label to provide consumers with simple energy and environmental comparisons across all vehicles types, including battery electric vehicles (BEV), plug-in hybrid electric vehicles (PHEV), and conventional internal combustion engine vehicles powered by gasoline and diesel, to help consumers choose more efficient and environmentally-friendly vehicles.

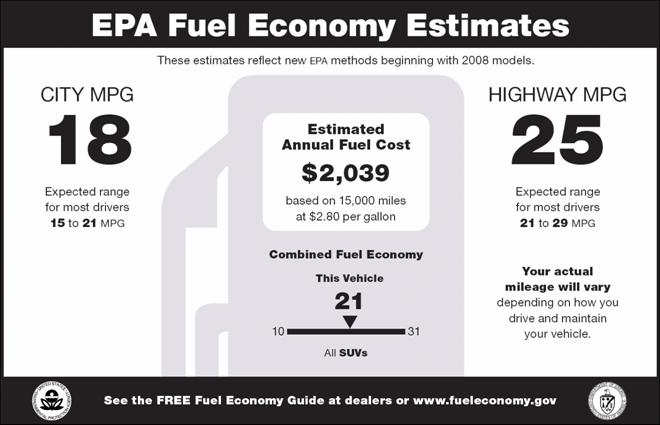
2008 fuel economy sticker

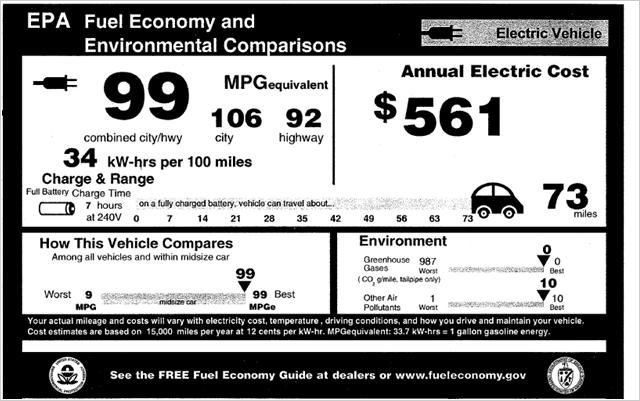
EPA's fuel economy and environmental label for the 2011 Nissan Leaf electric car

As part of the research and redesign process, EPA conducted focus groups in which participants were presented with several options to model electricity consumption for plug-in electric vehicles. The research showed that participants did not understand the concept of a kilowatt hour as a measure of electric energy use, even though this is the unit used on their monthly electric bills. Instead, participants favored a miles per gallon of gasoline equivalent (MPGe), as the metric for comparison with the familiar miles per gallon used for gasoline vehicles. The research also concluded that the kW-hrs per 100 miles metric was more confusing for focus group participants than miles per kW-hr. Based on these results, EPA decided to use the following fuel economy and fuel consumption metrics on the redesigned labels: MPG (city and highway, and combined); MPGe (city and highway, and combined); Gallons per 100 miles; kW-hrs per 100 miles.

The proposed design and final content for two options of the new sticker label that will be introduced in 2013 model year cars and trucks were consulted for 60 days with the public in 2010. Both included miles per gallon equivalent and kW-hrs per 100 miles as the fuel economy metrics for plug-in cars, but in one option, MPGe and annual electricity cost are the two most prominent metrics. One of the design options had a letter grading system from A to D, and the rating would have compared a given vehicle's fuel economy and air pollution to those of the entire fleet of new cars. The letter grade system was opposed by carmakers and rejected after the public consultation. In November 2010, the EPA introduced MPGe as a comparison metric on its new sticker for fuel economy for the Nissan Leaf and the Chevrolet Volt.

== 2013 fuel economy and environment label ==
New design of the EPA/DOE fuel economy and environment label for the 2012 Chevrolet Equinox showing potential fuel cost savings for the plug-in hybrid and other performance indicators.

In May 2011, the National Highway Traffic Safety Administration (NHTSA) and the EPA issued a joint final rule establishing new requirements for a fuel economy and environmental label that will be mandatory for all new passenger cars and trucks starting with the 2013 model year. However, carmakers could adopt it voluntarily for the 2012 model year. The ruling includes new labels for alternative fuel and alternative propulsion vehicles available in the U.S. market, such as plug-in hybrids, electric vehicles, flexible-fuel vehicles, hydrogen fuel cell vehicle, and natural gas vehicles. The common fuel economy metric adopted to allow the comparison of alternative fuel and advanced technology vehicles with conventional internal combustion engine vehicles is miles per gallon of gasoline equivalent (MPGe). A gallon of gasoline equivalent means the number of kilowatt-hours of electricity, cubic feet of compressed natural gas (CNG), or kilograms of hydrogen that is equal to the energy in a gallon of gasoline.

The new labels include, for the first time, an estimate of how much fuel or electricity it takes to drive 100 miles (160 km), providing U.S. consumers with fuel consumption per distance traveled, the efficiency metric commonly used in many other countries. EPA's objective is to avoid the traditional miles per gallon metric that can be potentially misleading when consumers compare fuel economy improvements, and this is known as the "MPG illusion."

Other information provided for the first time in the redesigned labels includes:

- Greenhouse gas ratings of how a model compares to all others for tailpipe emissions of carbon dioxide. A footnote-like note clarifies that upstream emissions from electricity generation are not included.
- Smog emissions ratings are based on air pollutants such as nitrogen oxides and particulates.
- New ways to compare energy use and cost between new-technology cars that use electricity and conventional cars that are gasoline-powered.
- Estimates on how much typical consumers will save or spend on fuel over the next five years compared to the average new vehicle.
- Information on the driving range while running in all-electric mode and charging time for plug-in hybrids and electric cars.
- A QR Code that a smartphone can scan to allow users access to online information about how various models compare on fuel economy, the price of gasoline and electricity where the user lives, and other environmental and energy factors. This tool will also allow consumers to enter information about their typical commutes and driving behavior to get a more precise estimate of fuel costs and savings.

Typical labels for each fuel or advanced technology

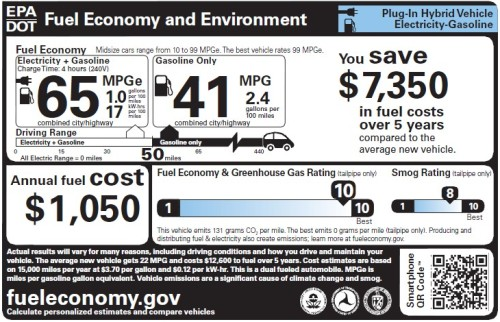
Label for blended or series-parallel plug-in hybrid

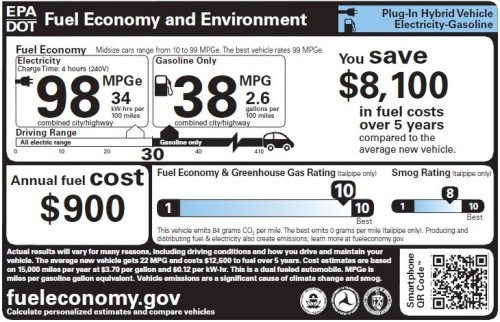
Label for series plug-in hybrid or extended range electric vehicle

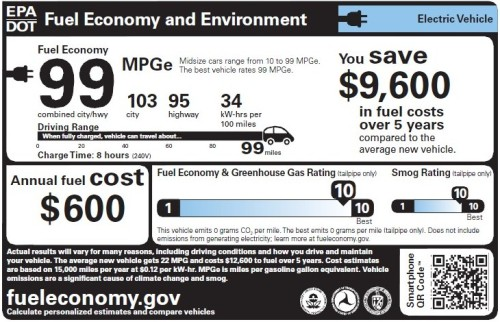
Label for electric car

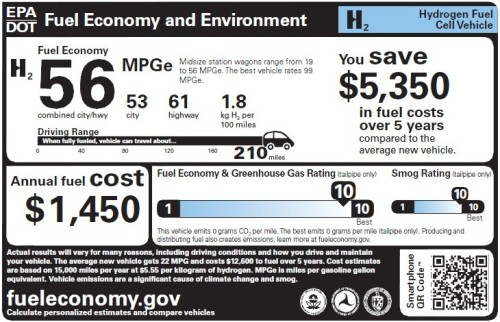
Label for hydrogen fuel cell vehicle
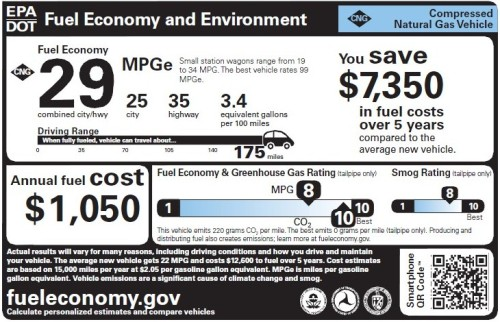
Label for natural gas vehicle

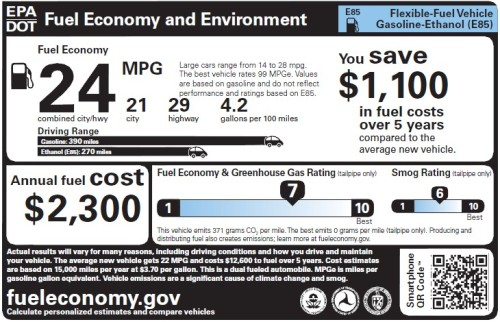
Label for E85 flexible-fuel vehicle

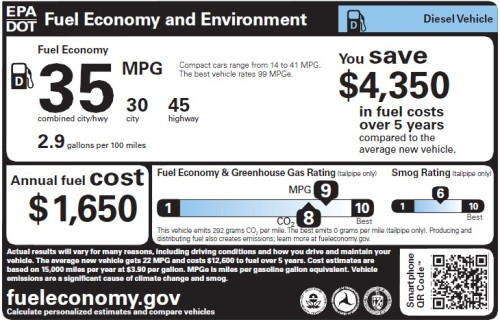
Label for diesel vehicle

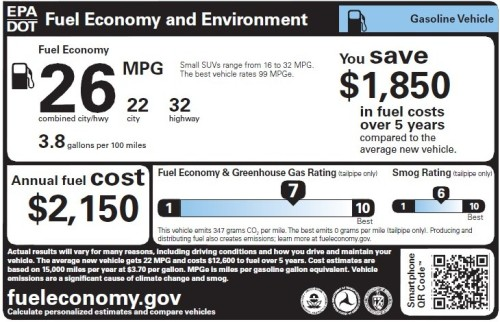
Label for gasoline vehicle
