= Fuel economy in automobiles =

Distance traveled by a vehicle compared to volume of fuel consumed

New light-duty vehicle fuel economy by vehicle type from vehicle manufacturers in the United States, in miles per gallon (1975 - 2019)

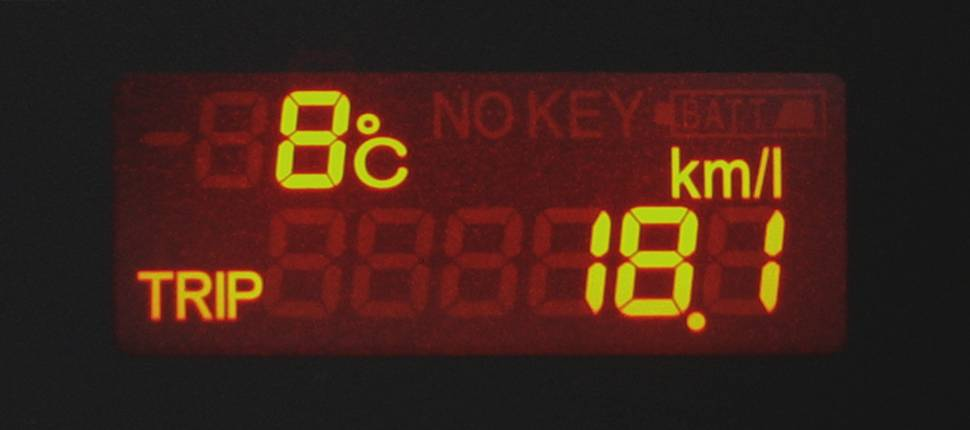
Fuel consumption monitor from a 2006 Honda Airwave. The displayed fuel economy is 18.1 km/L (5.5 L/100 km; 43 mpg_{‑US}).

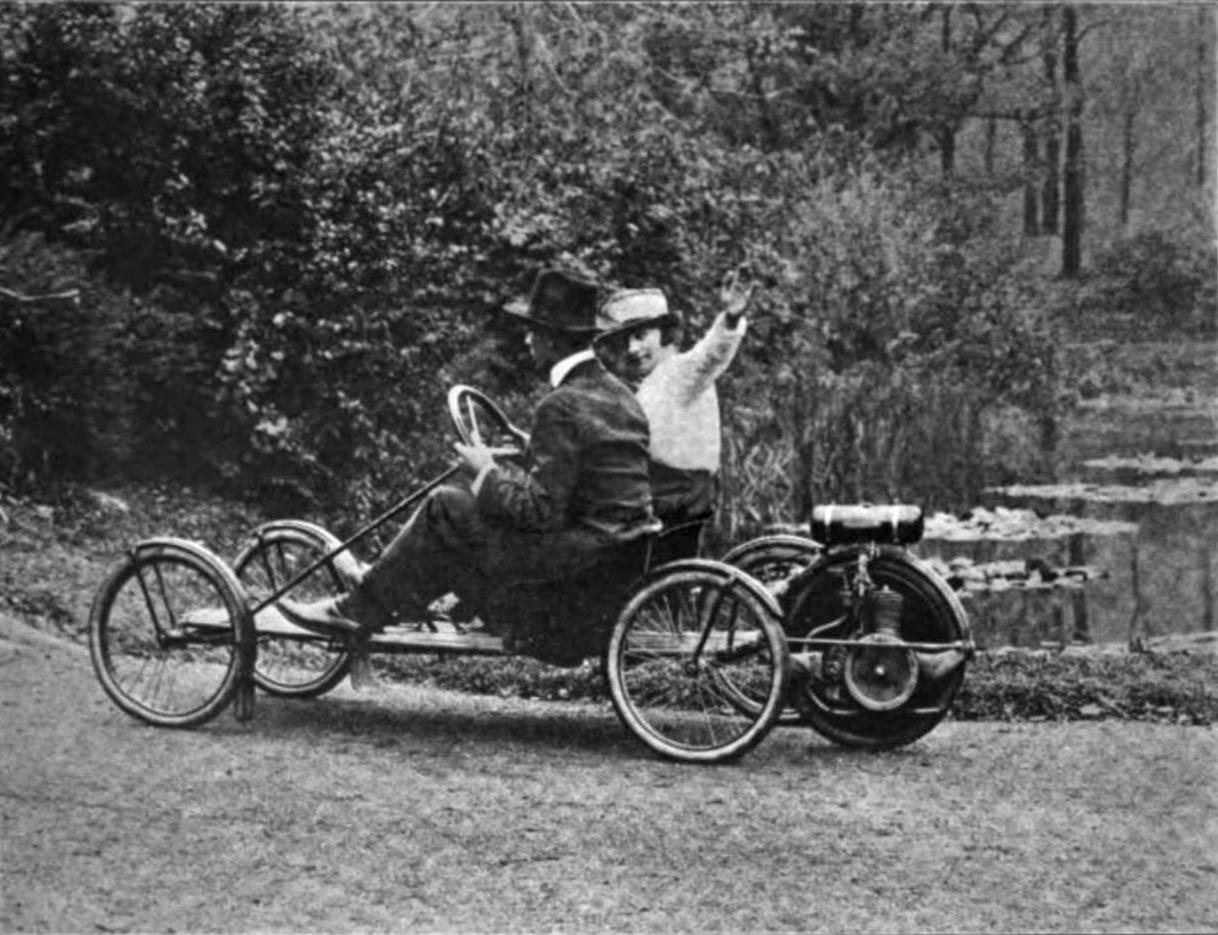
A Briggs and Stratton Flyer from 1916. Originally an experiment in creating a fuel-saving automobile in the United States, the vehicle weighed only 135 lb (61.2 kg) and was an adaptation of a small gasoline engine originally designed to power a bicycle.

The fuel economy (also called fuel efficiency or mileage) of an automobile relates to the distance traveled by a vehicle and the amount of fuel consumed. It can be expressed in terms of the volume of fuel to travel a given distance, such as in litres per 100 kilometres (L/100 km), or through its inverse, the distance traveled per unit volume of fuel consumed, as in kilometres per litre (km/L) or miles per gallon (mpg). Since fuel economy of vehicles is a significant factor in air pollution, the importation of motor fuel can be a large part of a nation's foreign trade and consumers frequently undervalue fuel efficiency, many countries impose requirements for fuel economy.

Different methods are used to approximate the actual performance of the vehicle. The energy in fuel is required to overcome various losses (such as wind resistance or tire drag) encountered while propelling the vehicle, and in providing power to vehicle systems such as ignition or air conditioning. Various strategies can be employed to reduce losses at each of the conversions between the chemical energy in the fuel and the kinetic energy of the vehicle. Driver behavior can affect fuel economy; maneuvers such as sudden acceleration and heavy braking waste energy.

Electric cars use kilowatt-hours of electricity per 100 kilometres (kWh/100km); in the U.S., an equivalence measure, such as miles per gallon gasoline equivalent (US gallon) has been created to attempt to compare them.

== Quantities and units of measure ==
Conversion from mpg to L/100 km: blue - US gallon; red - UK gallon (imperial)

The fuel efficiency of motor vehicles can be expressed in multiple ways:

- Fuel consumption is the fuel used per unit distance; for example, litres per 100 kilometres (L/100 km). The lower the value, the more economic a vehicle is; this is the measure generally used across Europe (except the UK, Denmark and The Netherlands - see below), Africa, New Zealand, Australia, and Canada, Uruguay, Paraguay, Guatemala, Colombia, China, and Madagascar, and in the former CIS states.,
- Fuel economy is the distance travelled per unit volume of fuel used; for example, kilometres per litre (km/L) or miles per gallon (MPG). The higher the value, the more economic a vehicle is (the more distance it can travel with a certain volume of fuel). This measure is popular in the US and the UK (mpg), but in Europe, India, Japan, South Korea the metric unit km/L is used instead.

The formula for converting to miles per US gallon (3.7854 L) from L/100 km is $\textstyle \frac{235.215}{x}$, where $x$ is value of L/100 km. For miles per Imperial gallon (4.5461 L) the formula is $\textstyle \frac{282.481}{x}$.

Europe now uses the WLTP standard to compare the fuel economy of all new vehicles.

Fuel economy can be expressed in two ways:

Units of fuel per fixed distance
Generally expressed in liters per 100 kilometers (L/100 km), used in most European countries, Canada, China, South Africa, Australia and New Zealand. Irish law allows for the use of miles per imperial gallon, alongside liters per 100 kilometers. Liters per 100 kilometers may be used alongside miles per imperial gallon in the UK. The window sticker on new US cars displays the vehicle's fuel consumption in US gallons per 100 miles, in addition to the traditional mpg number. A lower number means more efficient, while a higher number means less efficient.

Units of distance per fixed fuel unit
Miles per gallon (mpg) are commonly used in the United States, the United Kingdom, and Canada (alongside L/100 km). Kilometers per liter (km/L) are more commonly used elsewhere in the Americas, Asia, parts of Africa and Oceania. In the Levant km/20 L is used, known as kilometers per tanaka, a metal container which has a volume of twenty liters. When mpg is used, it is necessary to identify the type of gallon: the imperial gallon is 4.54609 liters, and the U.S. gallon is 3.785 liters. When using a measure expressed as distance per fuel unit, a higher number means more efficient, while a lower number means less efficient.

Conversions of units:

Miles per US gallon → L/100 km:	$\frac {235}{\rm mpg_{US}} = \rm 1\; L/100\; km$	L/100 km → Miles per US gallon:	$\frac {235}{\rm L/100\; km} = \rm 1\; mpg_{US}$
Miles per Imperial gallon → L/100 km:	$\frac {282}{\rm mpg_{Imp}} = \rm 1\; L/100\; km$	L/100 km → Miles per Imperial gallon:	$\frac {282}{\rm L/100\; km} = \rm 1\; mpg_{Imp}$
Miles per US gallon → km/20 L:	$\rm 8.5\; mpg_{US} = 1\; km/20\;L$
L/100 km → km/20 L:	$\frac {2000}{\rm L/100\; km} = \rm 1\; km/20\;L$
Miles per US gallon → Miles per Imperial gallon:	$1\; \rm mpg_{US} = \rm 0.8327\; \rm mpg_{Imp}$
Miles per Imperial gallon → Miles per US gallon:	$1\; \rm mpg_{Imp} = 1.2001\; \rm mpg_{US}$

== Statistics ==
Trucks' share of US vehicles produced, has tripled since 1975. Though vehicle fuel efficiency has increased within each category, the overall trend toward less efficient types of vehicles has offset some of the benefits of greater fuel economy and reduction of carbon dioxide emissions. Without the shift towards SUVs, energy use per unit distance could have fallen 30% more than it did from 2010 to 2022.

While the thermal efficiency (mechanical output to chemical energy in fuel) of petroleum engines has increased since the beginning of the automotive era, this is not the only factor in fuel economy. The design of automobile as a whole, as well as usage patterns, affects the fuel economy. Published fuel economy is subject to variation between jurisdiction due to variations in testing protocols.

One of the first studies to determine fuel economy in the United States was the Mobil Economy Run, which was an event that took place every year from 1936 to 1968 (except during World War II). It was designed to provide real, efficient fuel efficiency numbers during a coast-to-coast test on real roads and with regular traffic and weather conditions. The Mobil Oil Corporation sponsored it and the United States Auto Club (USAC) sanctioned and operated the run. In more recent studies, the average fuel economy for new passenger cars in the United States improved from 17 miles per US gallon (13.8 L/100 km) in 1978 to 22 miles per US gallon (10.7 L/100 km) in 1982. The average (Note: Specifically, the production-weighted harmonic mean) fuel economy for new 2020 model year cars, light trucks and SUVs in the United States was 25.4 mpg_{‑US} (9.3 L/100 km). 2019 model year cars (ex. EVs) classified as "midsize" by the US EPA ranged from 12–56 mpg_{‑US} (19.6–4.2 L/100 km; 14–67 mpg_{‑imp}). However, due to environmental concerns caused by CO_{2} emissions, new EU regulations are being introduced to reduce the average emissions of cars sold beginning in 2012, to 130 g/km of CO_{2}, equivalent to 4.5 L/100 km (52 mpg_{‑US}; 63 mpg_{‑imp}) for a diesel-fueled car, and 5 L/100 km (47 mpg_{‑US}; 56 mpg_{‑imp}) for a gasoline (petrol)-fueled car.

The average consumption across the fleet is not immediately affected by the new vehicle fuel economy: for example, Australia's car fleet average in 2004 was 11.5 L/100 km (20.5 mpg_{‑US}), compared with the average new car consumption in the same year of 9.3 L/100 km (25.3 mpg_{‑US}).

=== Speed and fuel economy studies ===
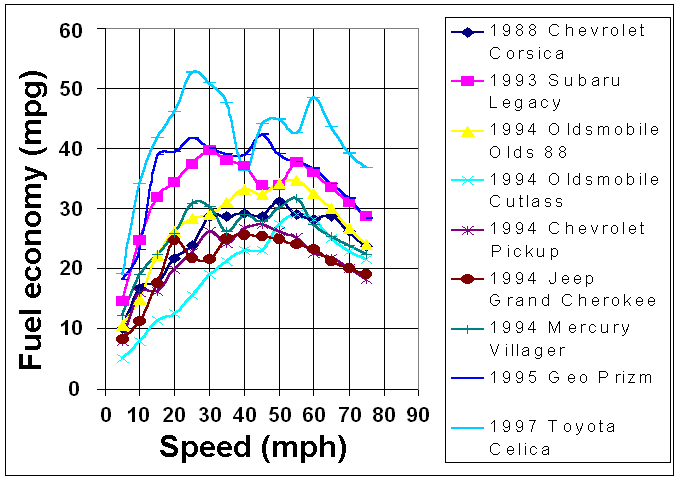
1997 fuel economy statistics for various US models

Fuel economy at steady speeds with selected vehicles was studied in 2010. The most recent study indicates greater fuel efficiency at higher speeds than earlier studies; for example, some vehicles achieve better fuel economy at 100 km/h (62 mph) rather than at 70 km/h (43 mph), although not their best economy, such as the 1994 Oldsmobile Cutlass Ciera with the LN2 2.2L engine, which has its best economy at 90 km/h (56 mph) (8.1 L/100 km (29 mpg_{‑US})), and gets better economy at 105 km/h (65 mph) than at 72 km/h (45 mph) (9.4 L/100 km (25 mpg_{‑US}) vs 22 mpg_{‑US} (11 L/100 km)). The proportion of driving on high speed roadways varies from 4% in Ireland to 41% in the Netherlands.

When the US National Maximum Speed Law's 55 mph (89 km/h) speed limit was mandated from 1974 to 1995, there were complaints that fuel economy could decrease instead of increase. The 1997 Toyota Celica got better fuel-efficiency at 105 km/h (65 mph) than it did at 65 km/h (40 mph) (5.41 L/100 km (43.5 mpg_{‑US}) vs 5.53 L/100 km (42.5 mpg_{‑US})), but was better at 60 mph (97 km/h) than at 65 mph (105 km/h) (48.4 mpg_{‑US} (4.86 L/100 km) vs 43.5 mpg_{‑US} (5.41 L/100 km)), and its best economy (52.6 mpg_{‑US} (4.47 L/100 km)) was at only 25 mph (40 km/h). Other vehicles tested had from 1.4 to 20.2% better fuel-efficiency at 90 km/h (56 mph) vs. 105 km/h (65 mph). Their best economy was reached at speeds of 40 to 90 km/h (25 to 56 mph) (see graph).

Officials hoped that the 55 mph (89 km/h) limit, combined with a ban on ornamental lighting, no gasoline sales on Sunday, and a 15% cut in gasoline production, would reduce total gasoline consumption by 200,000 barrels a day, representing a 2.2% drop from annualized 1973 gasoline consumption levels. (Note: The 2.2% drop figure was calculated by finding daily consumption to be 9,299,684 barrels of petroleum. Obtain 1973's petroleum consumption from transportation sector at 2.1e from the Energy Consumption by Sector section, then convert to barrels using A1 in the Thermal Conversion Factors section (assume "conventional motor gasoline" since ethanol-based or purportedly smog-reducing gas was not common in 1973).) This was partly based on a belief that cars achieve maximum efficiency between 40 and 50 miles per hour (64 and 80 km/h) and that trucks and buses were most efficient at 55 mph (89 km/h).

In 1998, the U.S. Transportation Research Board footnoted an estimate that the 1974 National Maximum Speed Limit (NMSL) reduced fuel consumption by 0.2 to 1.0 percent. Rural interstates, the roads most visibly affected by the NMSL, accounted for 9.5% of the U.S' vehicle-miles-traveled in 1973, but such free-flowing roads typically provide more fuel-efficient travel than conventional roads.

=== Discussion of statistics ===
A reasonably modern European supermini and many mid-size cars, including station wagons, may manage motorway travel at 5 L/100 km (47 mpg_{‑US}; 56 mpg_{‑imp}) or 6.5 L/100 km (36 mpg_{‑US}; 43 mpg_{‑imp}), with carbon dioxide emissions of around 140 g/km.

An average North American mid-size car averages 21 mpg_{‑US} (11 L/100 km; 25 mpg_{‑imp}) in a city and 27 mpg_{‑US} (8.7 L/100 km; 32 mpg_{‑imp}) on a highway; a full-size SUV usually averages 13 mpg_{‑US} (18 L/100 km; 16 mpg_{‑imp}) in a city and 16 mpg_{‑US} (15 L/100 km; 19 mpg_{‑imp}) on a highway. Pickup trucks vary considerably; whereas a 4 cylinder-engined light pickup can achieve 28 mpg_{‑US} (8.4 L/100 km; 34 mpg_{‑imp}), a V8 full-size pickup with extended cabin averages 13 mpg_{‑US} (18 L/100 km; 16 mpg_{‑imp}) in a city and 15 mpg_{‑US} (16 L/100 km; 18 mpg_{‑imp}) on a highway.

The average fuel economy for all vehicles on the road is higher in Europe than the United States, because the higher cost of fuel changes consumer behaviour. In the UK, an imperial gallon of fuel cost US$6.06 in 2005. The average cost in the United States was US$2.61 for a US gallon.

European-built cars are generally more fuel-efficient than US vehicles. Europe has many highly efficient diesel cars and European gasoline/petrol vehicles are, on average, also more efficient than gasoline-powered vehicles in the USA. Most European vehicles cited in the CSI study run on diesel engines, which tend to achieve greater fuel efficiency than gasoline/petrol engines. Selling those cars in the United States is difficult because of emission standards, notes Walter McManus, a fuel economy expert at the University of Michigan Transportation Research Institute: "For the most part, European diesels don’t meet U.S. emission standards". Another reason why many European models are not sold in the United States is that labor unions object to having the big three import any new foreign built models, regardless of fuel economy, while laying off workers at home.

An example of European cars' capabilities of fuel economy is the microcar Smart Fortwo cdi, which can achieve up to 3.4 L/100 km (83 mpg_{‑imp}; 69 mpg_{‑US}) using a turbocharged three-cylinder 30 kW (40 hp) diesel engine. The Fortwo is produced by Daimler AG and is only sold by one company in the United States. Furthermore, the world record in fuel economy of production cars is held by the Volkswagen Group, with special production models (labeled "3L") of the Volkswagen Lupo and the Audi A2, consuming as little as 3 L/100 km (94 mpg_{‑imp}; 78 mpg_{‑US}).

Diesel engines generally achieve greater fuel efficiency than petrol (gasoline) engines. Passenger car diesel engines have energy efficiency of up to 41% but more typically 30%, and petrol engines of up to 37.3%, but more typically 20%. A common margin is 25% more efficiency for a turbodiesel.

For example, the current model, Skoda Octavia, using Volkswagen engines, has a combined European fuel efficiency of 5.7 L/100 km (50 mpg_{‑imp}; 41 mpg_{‑US}) for the 78 kW (105 hp) petrol engine and 4.5 L/100 km (63 mpg_{‑imp}; 52 mpg_{‑US}) for the 78 kW (105 hp), heavier, diesel engine vehicle. The higher compression ratio raises the energy efficiency, but diesel fuel also contains approximately 10% more energy per unit volume than gasoline/petrol which contributes to the reduced fuel consumption for a given power output.

In 2002, the United States had 85,174,776 trucks, and averaged 13.5 mpg_{‑US} (17.4 L/100 km; 16.2 mpg_{‑imp}). Large trucks, over 33,000 lb (15,000 kg), averaged 5.7 mpg_{‑US} (41 L/100 km; 6.8 mpg_{‑imp}).

U.S. Truck fuel economy
GVWR lbs	Number	Percentage	Average miles per truck	fuel economy	Percentage of fuel use
6,000 lbs and less	51,941,389	61.00%	11,882	17.6	42.70%
6,001 – 10,000 lbs	28,041,234	32.90%	12,684	14.3	30.50%
Light truck subtotal	79,982,623	93.90%	12,163	16.2	73.20%
10,001 – 14,000 lbs	691,342	0.80%	14,094	10.5	1.10%
14,001 – 16,000 lbs	290,980	0.30%	15,441	8.5	0.50%
16,001 – 19,500 lbs	166,472	0.20%	11,645	7.9	0.30%
19,501 – 26,000 lbs	1,709,574	2.00%	12,671	7	3.20%
Medium truck subtotal	2,858,368	3.40%	13,237	8	5.20%
26,001 – 33,000 lbs	179,790	0.20%	30,708	6.4	0.90%
33,001 lbs and up	2,153,996	2.50%	45,739	5.7	20.70%
Heavy truck subtotal	2,333,786	2.70%	44,581	5.8	21.60%
Total	85,174,776	100.00%	13,088	13.5	100.00%

The average economy of automobiles in the United States in 2002 was 22.0 mpg_{‑US} (10.7 L/100 km; 26.4 mpg_{‑imp}). By 2010, this had increased to 23.0 mpg_{‑US} (10.2 L/100 km; 27.6 mpg_{‑imp}). Average fuel economy in the United States gradually declined until 1973, when it reached a low of 13.4 mpg_{‑US} (17.6 L/100 km; 16.1 mpg_{‑imp}) and gradually has increased since, as a result of higher fuel costs. A study indicates that a 10% increase in gas prices will eventually produce a 2.04% increase in fuel economy. One method car makers to increase fuel efficiency is lightweighting, in which lighter-weight materials are substituted for improved engine performance and handling.

=== Differences in testing standards ===
Identical vehicles can have varying fuel consumption figures listed depending upon the testing methods of the jurisdiction. For example, the Lexus IS 250 petrol 2.5L 4GR-FSE V6, 204 horsepower (152 kW), 6 speed automatic, rear wheel drive achieved the following fuel efficiencies:

- Australia (L/100 km) – 'combined' 9.1, 'urban' 12.7, 'extra-urban' 7.0
- Canada (L/100 km) – 'combined' 9.6, 'city' 11.1, 'highway' 7.8
- European Union (L/100 km) – 'combined' 8.9, 'urban' 12.5, 'extra-urban' 6.9
- United States (L/100 km) – 'combined' 9.8, 'city' 11.2, 'highway' 8.1

== Energy considerations ==
Since the total force opposing the vehicle's motion (at constant speed) multiplied by the distance through which the vehicle travels represents the work that the vehicle's engine must perform, the study of fuel economy (the amount of energy consumed per unit of distance traveled) requires a detailed analysis of the forces that oppose a vehicle's motion. In terms of physics, Force = rate at which the amount of work generated (energy delivered) varies with the distance traveled, or:

$$F = \frac{dW}{ds} \propto \text{Fuel economy}$$

Note: The amount of work generated by the vehicle's power source (energy delivered by the engine) would be exactly proportional to the amount of fuel energy consumed by the engine if the engine's efficiency is the same regardless of power output, but this is not necessarily the case due to the operating characteristics of the internal combustion engine.

For a vehicle whose source of power is a heat engine (an engine that uses heat to perform useful work), the amount of fuel energy that a vehicle consumes per unit of distance (level road) depends upon:

1. The thermodynamic efficiency of the heat engine;
2. Frictional losses within the drivetrain;
3. Rolling resistance within the wheels and between the road and the wheels;
4. Non-motive subsystems powered by the engine, such as air conditioning, engine cooling, and the alternator;
5. Aerodynamic drag from moving through air;
6. Energy converted by frictional brakes into waste heat, or losses from regenerative braking in hybrid vehicles;
7. Fuel consumed while the engine is not providing power but still running, such as while idling, minus the subsystem loads.

Energy dissipation in city and highway driving for a mid-size gasoline-powered car

Ideally, a car traveling at a constant velocity on level ground in a vacuum with frictionless wheels could travel at any speed without consuming any energy beyond what is needed to get the car up to speed. Less ideally, any vehicle must expend energy to overcome road load forces, which consist of aerodynamic drag, tire rolling resistance, and inertial energy that is lost when the vehicle is decelerated by friction brakes. With ideal regenerative braking, the inertial energy could be completely recovered. The only options for reducing aerodynamic drag or rolling resistance is optimizing the vehicle's shape and the tire design. Road load energy, or the energy demanded at the wheels, can be calculated by evaluating the vehicle equation of motion over a specific driving cycle. The vehicle powertrain must then provide this minimum energy to move the vehicle and will lose a large amount of additional energy in the process of converting fuel energy into work and transmitting it to the wheels. Overall, the sources of energy loss in moving a vehicle may be summarized as follows:

- Engine efficiency (20–30%), which varies with engine type, the mass of the automobile and its load, and engine speed (usually measured in RPM).
- Aerodynamic drag force, which increases roughly by the square of the car's speed, but notes that drag power goes by the cube of the car's speed.
- Rolling friction.
- Braking, although regenerative braking captures some of the energy that would otherwise be lost.
- Losses in the transmission. Manual transmissions can be up to 94% efficient whereas older automatic transmissions may be as low as 70% efficient Automated manual transmissions, which have the same mechanical internals as conventional manual transmissions, will give the same efficiency as a pure manual gearbox plus the added bonus of intelligence selecting optimal shifting points, and/or automated clutch control but manual shifting, as with older semi-automatic transmissions.
- Air conditioning. The power required for the engine to turn the compressor decreases the fuel-efficiency, though only when in use. This may be offset by the reduced drag of the vehicle compared with driving with the windows down. The efficiency of AC systems gradually deteriorates due to dirty filters etc.; regular maintenance prevents this. The extra mass of the air conditioning system will cause a slight increase in fuel consumption.
- Power steering. The older hydraulic power steering systems are powered by a hydraulic pump constantly engaged to the engine. Power assistance required for steering is inversely proportional to the vehicle speed so the constant load on the engine from a hydraulic pump reduces fuel efficiency. More modern designs improve fuel efficiency by only activating the power assistance when needed; this is done by using either direct electrical power steering assistance or an electrically powered hydraulic pump.
- Cooling. The older cooling systems used a constantly engaged mechanical fan to draw air through the radiator at a rate directly related to the engine speed. This constant load reduces efficiency. More modern systems use electrical fans to draw additional air through the radiator when extra cooling is required.
- Electrical systems. Headlights, battery charging, active suspension, circulating fans, defrosters, media systems, speakers, and other electronics can also significantly increase fuel consumption, as the energy to power these devices causes an increased load on the alternator. Since alternators are commonly only 40–60% efficient, the added load from electronics on the engine can be as high as 3 horsepower (2.2 kW) at any speed including idle. In the FTP 75 cycle test, a 200-watt load on the alternator reduces fuel efficiency by 1.7 mpg_{‑US} (140 L/100 km; 2.0 mpg_{‑imp}). Headlights, for example, consume 110 watts on low and up to 240 watts on high. These electrical loads can cause much of the discrepancy between real-world and EPA tests, which only include the electrical loads required to run the engine and basic climate control.
- Standby. The energy is needed to keep the engine running while it is not providing power to the wheels, i.e., when stopped, coasting or braking.

Fuel-efficiency decreases from electrical loads are most pronounced at lower speeds because most electrical loads are constant while engine load increases with speed. So at a lower speed, a higher proportion of engine power is used by electrical loads. Hybrid cars see the greatest effect on fuel-efficiency from electrical loads because of this proportional effect.

=== Fuel economy-boosting technologies ===
==== Engine-specific technology ====
Type	Technology	Explanation	Inventor	Notes
Engine cycle	Replacing petrol engines with diesel engines	Reduces brake specific fuel consumption at lower RPM	Herbert Akroyd Stuart	
Engine combustion strategies	Electronic control of the cooling system	Optimizes engine running temperature		
	Stratified Charge combustion	Injects fuel into cylinder just before ignition, increasing compression ratio		For use in petrol engines
	Lean burn combustion	Increases air/fuel ratio to reduce throttling losses	Chrysler	https://www.youtube.com/watch?v=KnNX6gtDyhg
	Cooled exhaust gas recirculation (petrol)	Reduces throttling losses, heat rejection, chemical dissociation, and specific heat ratio		
	Cooled exhaust gas recirculation (diesel)	Lowers peak combustion temperatures		
	Atkinson cycle	Lengthens power stroke to achieve greater thermal efficiency	James Atkinson	Atkinson cycle
	Variable valve timing and variable valve lift	Alters valve lift timing and height for precise control over intake and exhaust		William Howe and William Williams (Robert Stephenson and Company) invented the first variable timing valve
	Variable geometry turbocharging	Optimizes airflow with adjustable vanes to regulate turbocharger's air intake and eliminate turbo lag	Garrett (Honeywell)	VNT Vanes Open
	Twincharging	Combines a supercharger with a turbocharger to eliminate turbo lag	Lancia	For use in small-displacement engines
	Gasoline direct injection (GDI) engines	Allows for stratified fuel charge and ultra-lean burn	Leon Levavasseur	
	Turbocharged Direct Injection diesel engines	Combines direct injection with a turbocharger	Volkswagen	
	Common rail direct injection	Increases injection pressure	Robert Huber	
	Piezoelectric diesel injectors	Uses multiple injections per engine cycle for increased precision		
	Cylinder management	Shuts off individual cylinders when their power output is not needed		
	HCCI (Homogeneous Charge Compression Ignition) combustion	Allows leaner and higher compression burn		https://www.youtube.com/watch?v=B8CnYljXAS0
	Scuderi engine	Eliminates recompression losses	Carmelo J. Scuderi	Scuderi engine
	Compound engines (6-stroke engine or turbo-compound engine)	Recovers exhaust energy		
	Two-stroke diesel engines	Increases power to weight ratio	Charles F. Kettering	
	High-efficiency gas turbine engines	Increases power to weight ratio		
	Turbosteamer	Uses heat from the engine to spin a mini turbine to generate power	Raymond Freymann (BMW)	
	Stirling hybrid battery vehicle	Increases thermal efficiency	Still largely theoretical, although prototypes have been produced by Dean Kamen	
	Time-optimized piston path	Captures energy from gases in the cylinders at their highest temperatures		
Engine internal losses	Downsized engines with a supercharger or a turbocharger	Reduces engine displacement while maintaining sufficient torque	Saab, starting with the 99 in 1978.	2014-Global-Turbo-Forecast
	Lower-friction lubricants (engine oil, transmission fluid, axle fluid)	Reduces energy lost to friction		
	Lower viscosity engine oils	Reduces hydrodynamic friction and energy required to circulate		
	Variable displacement oil pump	Avoids excessive flow rate at high engine speed		
	Electrifying engine accessories (water pump, power steering pump, and air conditioner compressor)	Sends more engine power to the transmission or reduces the fuel required for the same traction power		
	Roller type cam, low friction coating on piston skirt and optimizing load-bearing surface, e.g. camshaft bearing and connective rods.	Reduces engine frictions		
Engine running conditions	Coolant additives	Increases the thermal efficiency of the cooling system		
	Increasing the number of gearbox ratios in manual gearboxes	Lowers the engine rpm at cruise		
	Reducing the volume of water-based cooling systems	Engine reaches its efficient operating temperature more quickly		
	Start-stop system	Automatically shuts off engine when vehicle is stopped, reducing idle time		
	Downsized engines with an electric drive system and battery	Avoids low-efficiency idle and power conditions		

==== Other vehicle technologies ====
Type	Technology	Explanation	Inventor	Notes
Transmission losses	Continuously variable transmission (CVT)	Enables engine to run at its most efficient RPM		For use in automatic gearboxes
	Locking torque converters in automatic transmissions	Reduces slip and power losses in the converter		
Rolling resistance	Lighter construction materials (aluminum, fiberglass, plastic, high-strength steel, and carbon fiber)	Reduces vehicle weight		
	Increasing tire pressure	Lowers tire deformation under weight		
	Replacing tires with low rolling resistance (LRR) models	Lowers rolling resistance		
Series parallel hybrid	Using an electric motor for the base power and an IC engine for assists and boosts, when needed	Decreases fuel consumption by running the petrol engine only when needed, in this way also environmentally friendly.	TRW	
Energy saving	Lighter materials for moving parts (pistons, crankshaft, gears, and alloy wheels)	Reduces the energy required to move parts		
	Regenerative braking	Captures kinetic energy while braking	Louis Antoine Kriéger	For use in hybrid or electric vehicles
	Recapturing waste heat from the exhaust system	Converts heat energy into electricity using thermoelectric cooling	Jean Charles Athanase Peltier	
	Regenerative shock absorbers	Recaptures wasted energy in the vehicle suspension	Levant Power	
Traffic management	Active highway management	Matches speed limits and vehicles allowed to join motorways with traffic density to maintain traffic throughput		
	Vehicle electronic control systems that automatically maintain distances between vehicles on motorways	Reduces ripple back braking and consequent re-acceleration		

==== Future technologies ====
Technologies that may improve fuel efficiency, but are not yet on the market, include:

- HCCI (Homogeneous Charge Compression Ignition) combustion
- Scuderi engine
- Compound engines
- Two-stroke diesel engines
- High-efficiency gas turbine engines
- BMW's Turbosteamer – using the heat from the engine to spin a mini turbine to generate power
- Vehicle electronic control systems that automatically maintain distances between vehicles on motorways/freeways that reduce ripple back braking, and consequent re-acceleration.
- Time-optimized piston path, to capture energy from hot gases in the cylinders when they are at their highest temperatures
- Sterling hybrid battery vehicle

Many aftermarket consumer products exist that are purported to increase fuel economy; many of these claims have been discredited. In the United States, the Environmental Protection Agency maintains a list of devices that have been tested by independent laboratories and makes the test results available to the public.

=== Fuel economy maximizing behaviors ===
Governments, various environmentalist organizations, and companies like Toyota and Shell Oil Company have historically urged drivers to maintain adequate air pressure in tires and careful acceleration/deceleration habits. Keeping track of fuel efficiency stimulates fuel economy-maximizing behavior.

A five-year partnership between Michelin and Anglian Water shows that 60,000 liters of fuel can be saved on tire pressure. The Anglian Water fleet of 4,000 vans and cars are now lasting their full lifetime. This shows the impact that tire pressures have on the fuel efficiency.

=== Fuel economy as part of quality management regimes ===
Environmental management systems EMAS, as well as good fleet management, includes record-keeping of the fleet fuel consumption. Quality management uses those figures to steer the measures acting on the fleets. This is a way to check whether procurement, driving, and maintenance in total have contributed to changes in the fleet's overall consumption.

== Fuel economy standards and testing procedures ==
Gasoline new passenger car fuel efficiency
Country	2004 average	Requirement			
Country	2004 average	2004	2005	2008	Later
People's Republic of China			6.9 L/100 km	6.9 L/100 km	6.1 L/100 km
United States	24.6 mpg_{‑US} (9.6 L/100 km) (cars and trucks)*	27 mpg_{‑US} (8.7 L/100 km)(cars only)*			35 mpg_{‑US} (6.7 L/100 km) (Model Year 2020, cars & light trucks)
European Union					4.1 L/100 km (2020, NEDC)
Japan					6.7 L/100 km CAFE eq (2010)
Australia	8.08 L/100 km CAFE eq (2002)	none			none (as of March 2019)

* highway ** combined

=== Australia ===
From October 2008, all new cars had to be sold with a sticker on the windscreen showing the fuel consumption and the CO_{2} emissions. Fuel consumption figures are expressed as urban, extra urban and combined, measured according to ECE Regulations 83 and 101 – which are the based on the European driving cycle; previously, only the combined number was given.

Australia also uses a star rating system, from one to five stars, that combines greenhouse gases with pollution, rating each from 0 to 10 with ten being best. To get 5 stars a combined score of 16 or better is needed, so a car with a 10 for economy (greenhouse) and a 6 for emission or 6 for economy and 10 for emission, or anything in between, would get the highest 5 star rating. The lowest rated car is the Ssangyong Korrando with automatic transmission, with one star, while the highest rated was the Toyota Prius hybrid. The Fiat 500, Fiat Punto and Fiat Ritmo as well as the Citroen C3 also received 5 stars. The greenhouse rating depends on the fuel economy and the type of fuel used. A greenhouse rating of 10 requires 60 or less grams of CO_{2} per km, while a rating of zero is more than 440 g/km CO_{2}. The highest greenhouse rating of any 2009 car listed is the Toyota Prius, with 106 g/km CO_{2} and 4.4 L/100 km (64 mpg_{‑imp}; 53 mpg_{‑US}). Several other cars also received the same rating of 8.5 for greenhouse. The lowest rated was the Ferrari 575 at 499 g/km CO_{2} and 21.8 L/100 km (13.0 mpg_{‑imp}; 10.8 mpg_{‑US}). The Bentley also received a zero rating, at 465 g/km CO_{2}. The best fuel economy of any year is the 2004–2005 Honda Insight, at 3.4 L/100 km (83 mpg_{‑imp}; 69 mpg_{‑US}).

=== Canada ===
Vehicle manufacturers follow a controlled laboratory testing procedure to generate the fuel consumption data that they submit to the Government of Canada. This controlled method of fuel consumption testing, including the use of standardized fuels, test cycles and calculations, is used instead of on-road driving to ensure that all vehicles are tested under identical conditions and that the results are consistent and repeatable.

Selected test vehicles are "run in" for about 6,000 km before testing. The vehicle is then mounted on a chassis dynamometer programmed to take into account the aerodynamic efficiency, weight and rolling resistance of the vehicle. A trained driver runs the vehicle through standardized driving cycles that simulate trips in the city and on the highway. Fuel consumption ratings are derived from the emissions generated during the driving cycles.

==== The 5 cycle test ====
1. The city test simulates urban driving in stop-and-go traffic with an average speed of 34 km/h and a top speed of 90 km/h. The test runs for approximately 31 minutes and includes 23 stops. The test begins from a cold engine start, which is similar to starting a vehicle after it has been parked overnight during the summer. The final phase of the test repeats the first eight minutes of the cycle but with a hot engine start. This simulates restarting a vehicle after it has been warmed up, driven and then stopped for a short time. Over five minutes of test time are spent idling, to represent waiting at traffic lights. The ambient temperature of the test cell starts at 20 °C and ends at 30 °C.
2. The highway test simulates a mixture of open highway and rural road driving, with an average speed of 78 km/h and a top speed of 97 km/h. The test runs for approximately 13 minutes and does not include any stops. The test begins from a hot engine start. The ambient temperature of the test cell starts at 20 °C and ends at 30 °C.
3. In the cold temperature operation test, the same driving cycle is used as in the standard city test, except that the ambient temperature of the test cell is set to −7 °C.
4. In the air conditioning test, the ambient temperature of the test cell is raised to 35 °C. The vehicle's climate control system is then used to lower the internal cabin temperature. Starting with a warm engine, the test averages 35 km/h and reaches a maximum speed of 88 km/h. Five stops are included, with idling occurring 19% of the time.
5. The high speed/quick acceleration test averages 78 km/h and reaches a top speed of 129 km/h. Four stops are included and brisk acceleration maximizes at a rate of 13.6 km/h per second. The engine begins warm and air conditioning is not used. The ambient temperature of the test cell is constantly 25 °C.

Tests 1, 3, 4, and 5 are averaged to create the city driving fuel consumption rate.

Tests 2, 4, and 5 are averaged to create the highway driving fuel consumption rate.

=== Europe ===
Irish fuel economy label

In the European Union, passenger vehicles are commonly tested using two drive cycles, and corresponding fuel economies are reported as "urban" and "extra-urban", in liters per 100 km and (in the UK) in miles per imperial gallon.

The urban economy is measured using the test cycle known as ECE-15, first introduced in 1970 by EC Directive 70/220/EWG and finalized by EEC Directive 90/C81/01 in 1999. It simulates a 4,052 metres (2.5 mi) urban trip at an average speed of 18.7 km/h (11.6 mph) and at a maximum speed of 50 km/h (31 mph).

The extra-urban driving cycle or EUDC lasts 400 (6 minutes 40 seconds) at an average speed of 62.6 km/h (38.9 mph) and a top speed of 120 km/h (74.6 mph).

EU fuel consumption numbers are often considerably lower than corresponding US EPA test results for the same vehicle. For example, the 2011 Honda CR-Z with a six-speed manual transmission is rated 6.1/4.4 L/100 km in Europe and 7.6/6.4 L/100 km (31/37 mpg) in the United States.

In the European Union, advertising has to show carbon dioxide (CO_{2})-emission and fuel consumption data in a clear way, as described in the UK Statutory Instrument 2004 No 1661. Since September 2005, a color-coded "Green Rating" sticker has been available in the UK, which rates fuel economy by CO_{2} emissions: A: <= 100 g/km, B: 100–120, C: 121–150, D: 151–165, E: 166–185, F: 186–225, and G: 226+. Depending on the type of fuel used, for gasoline A corresponds to about 4.1 L/100 km (69 mpg_{‑imp}; 57 mpg_{‑US}) and G about 9.5 L/100 km (30 mpg_{‑imp}; 25 mpg_{‑US}). Ireland has a very similar label, but the ranges are slightly different, with A: <= 120 g/km, B: 121–140, C: 141–155, D: 156–170, E: 171–190, F: 191–225, and G: 226+. From 2020, EU requires manufacturers to average 95 g/km CO_{2} emission or less, or pay an excess emissions premium.

In the UK, the ASA (Advertising standards agency) have claimed that fuel consumption figures are misleading. This is often the case with European vehicles, as the MPG (miles per gallon) figures that can be advertised are often not the same as "real world" driving.

The ASA have said that car manufacturers can use "cheats" to prepare their vehicles for their compulsory fuel efficiency and emissions tests, in order to make themselves look as "clean" as possible. This practice is common in gasoline and diesel vehicle tests, but hybrid and electric vehicles are not immune, as manufacturers apply these techniques to fuel efficiency.

Car experts also assert that the official MPG figures given by manufacturers do not represent the true MPG values from real-world driving. Websites have been set up to show the real-world MPG figures, based on crowd-sourced data from real users, vs the official MPG figures.

The major loopholes in the current EU tests allow car manufacturers a number of "cheats" to improve results. Car manufacturers can:

- Disconnect the alternator, thus no energy is used to recharge the battery;
- Use special lubricants that are not used in production cars, in order to reduce friction;
- Turn off all electrical gadgets i.e. air con/radio;
- Adjust brakes or even disconnect them to reduce friction;
- Tape up cracks between body panels and windows to reduce air resistance;
- Remove wing mirrors.

According to the results of a 2014 study by the International Council on Clean Transportation (ICCT), the gap between official and real-world fuel-economy figures in Europe has risen to about 38% in 2013 from 10% in 2001. The analysis found that, for private cars, the difference between on-road and official CO_{2} values rose from around 8% in 2001 to 31% in 2013, and 45% for company cars in 2013. The report is based on data from more than half a million private and company vehicles across Europe. The analysis was prepared by the ICCT together with the Netherlands Organization for Applied Scientific Research (TNO), and the German Institut für Energie- und Umweltforschung Heidelberg (IFEU).

In 2018, an update of the ICCT data showed that the difference between the official and real figures was again 38%.

=== Japan ===
The evaluation criteria used in Japan reflects driving conditions commonly found there, as the typical Japanese driver does not drive as fast as other regions internationally (see speed limits in Japan).

==== 10–15 mode ====
The 10–15 mode driving cycle test is the official fuel economy and emission certification test for new light duty vehicles in Japan. Fuel economy is expressed in km/L (kilometers per liter) and emissions are expressed in g/km. The test is carried out on a dynamometer and consist of 25 tests which cover idling, acceleration, steady running and deceleration, and simulate typical Japanese urban and/or expressway driving conditions. The running pattern begins with a warm start, lasts for 660 seconds (11 minutes) and runs at speeds up to 70 km/h (43.5 mph). The distance of the cycle is 6.34 km (3.9 mi), the average speed is 25.6 km/h (15.9 mph), and the duration is 892 seconds (14.9 minutes), including the initial 15 mode segment.

==== JC08 ====
A new more demanding test, called the JC08, was established in December 2006 for Japan's new standard that went into effect in 2015, although it had already been used by several car manufacturers for new cars before the new standard. The JC08 test is significantly longer and more rigorous than the 10–15 mode test. The running pattern with JC08 stretches out to 1200 seconds (20 minutes), there are both cold and warm start measurements, and the top speed is 82 km/h (51.0 mph). The economy ratings of the JC08 are lower than the 10–15 mode cycle, but they are expected to be more accurate to the real world. The Toyota Prius became the first car to meet Japan's new 2015 Fuel Economy Standards measured under the JC08 test.

=== New Zealand ===
Starting on 7 April 2008, all cars of up to 3.5 tonnes GVW sold, other than private sale, need to have a fuel economy sticker applied (if available) that shows the rating from one half star to six stars (the most economic cars having the most stars and the more fuel hungry cars the least), along with the fuel economy in L/100 km and the estimated annual fuel cost for driving 14,000 km (at present fuel prices). The stickers must also appear on vehicles to be leased for more than 4 months. All new cars currently rated range from 6.9 L/100 km (41 mpg_{‑imp}; 34 mpg_{‑US}) to 3.8 L/100 km (74 mpg_{‑imp}; 62 mpg_{‑US}) and received from 4.5 to 5.5 stars respectively.

=== Saudi Arabia ===
The Kingdom of Saudi Arabia announced new light-duty vehicle fuel economy standards in November 2014, which became effective on 1 January, 2016, and were fully phased in by 1 January, 2018 (Saudi Standards regulation SASO-2864). A review of the targets was planned to be carried out by December 2018, at which time targets for 2021–2025 would be set.

=== United States ===
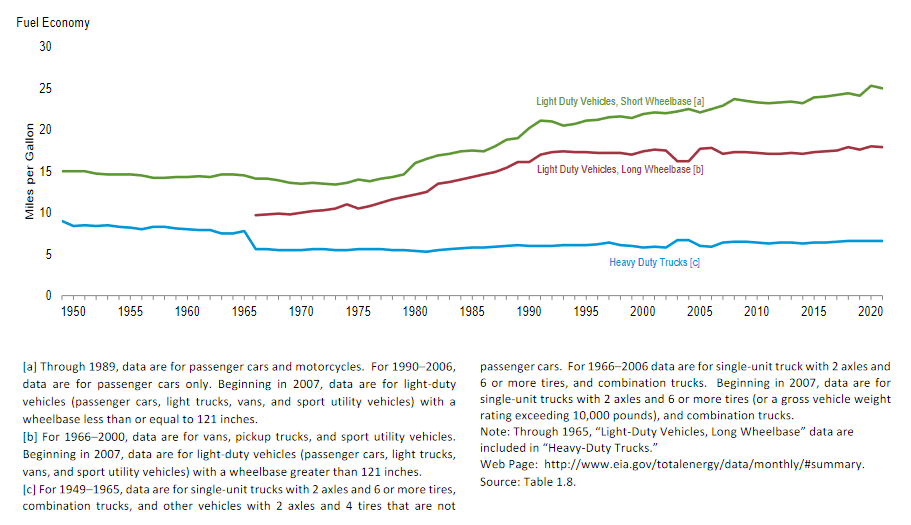
Motor vehicle fuel economy from 1949 to 2021

==== US Energy Tax Act ====
The Energy Tax Act of 1978 in the US established a "gas guzzler tax" on the sale of new model year vehicles whose fuel economy fails to meet certain statutory levels. The tax applies only to cars (not trucks) and is collected by the IRS. Its purpose is to discourage the production and purchase of fuel-inefficient vehicles. The tax was phased in over ten years, with rates increasing over time. It applies only to manufacturers and importers of vehicles, although presumably some or all of the tax is passed along to automobile consumers in the form of higher prices. Only new vehicles are subject to the tax, so no tax is imposed on used car sales. The tax is graduated to apply a higher tax rate for less-fuel-efficient vehicles. To determine the tax rate, manufacturers test all the vehicles at their laboratories for fuel economy. The US Environmental Protection Agency confirms a portion of those tests at an EPA lab.

In some cases, this tax may apply only to certain variants of a given model; for example, the 2004–2006 Pontiac GTO (captive import version of the Holden Monaro) did incur the tax when ordered with the four-speed automatic transmission, but did not incur the tax when ordered with the six-speed manual transmission.

==== EPA testing procedure through 2007 ====
Two separate fuel economy tests simulate city driving and highway driving. The "city" driving cycle is based on the Urban Dynamometer Driving Schedule or (UDDS) or FTP-72, defined in 40 CFR 86.I. The UDDS cycle starts with a cold engine and makes 23 stops over a period of 31 minutes for an average speed of 20 mph (32 km/h) and a top speed of 56 mph (90 km/h). The UDDS procedure has been updated to FTP-75 by adding a "hot start" cycle which repeats the "cold start" cycle after a 10-minute pause.

The "highway" program or Highway Fuel Economy Driving Schedule (HWFET) is defined in 40 CFR 600.I and uses a warmed-up engine and makes no stops, averaging 48 mph (77 km/h) with a top speed of 60 mph (97 km/h) over a 10-mile (16 km) distance. A weighted average of city (55%) and highway (45%) fuel economies is used to determine the combined rating and guzzler tax. This rating is what is also used for light-duty vehicle corporate average fuel economy regulations.

Because EPA figures had almost always indicated better efficiency than real-world fuel-efficiency, the EPA has modified the method starting with 2008. Updated estimates are available for vehicles back to the 1985 model year.

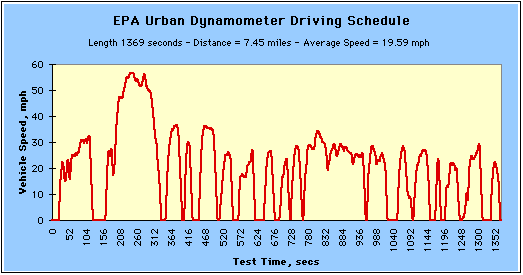
The "city" or Urban Dynamometer Driving Schedule (UDDS) used in the EPA Federal Test Procedure

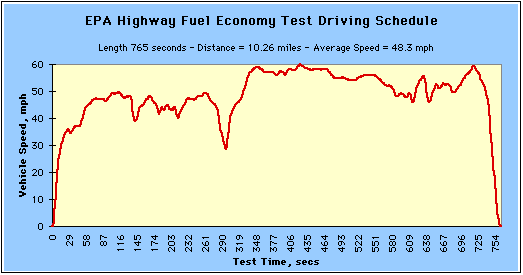
The Highway Fuel Economy Driving Cycle (HWFET) used in the EPA Federal Test Procedure

==== EPA testing procedure: 2008 and beyond ====
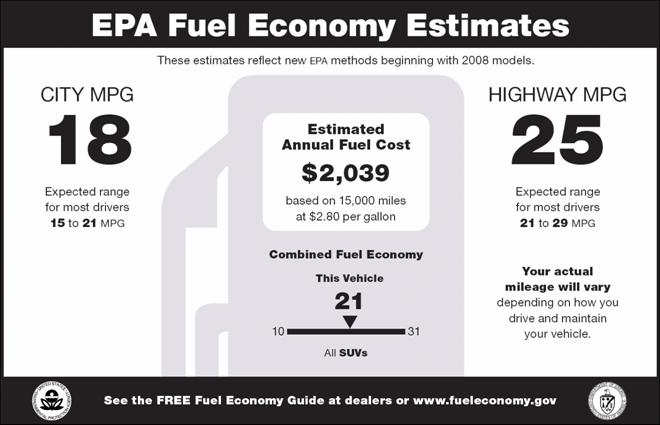
2008 Monroney sticker highlights fuel economy.

The EPA altered the testing procedure effective MY2008, which added three new Supplemental Federal Test Procedure (SFTP) tests, including the influence of higher driving speed, harder acceleration, colder temperature and air conditioning use.

SFTP US06 is a high speed/quick acceleration loop that lasts 10 minutes, covers 8 miles (13 km), averages 48 mph (77 km/h) and reaches a top speed of 80 mph (130 km/h). Four stops are included, and brisk acceleration maximizes at a rate of 8.46 mph (13.62 km/h) per second. The engine begins warm and air conditioning is not used. Ambient temperature varies between 68 °F (20 °C) to 86 °F (30 °C).

SFTP SC03 is the air conditioning test, which raises ambient temperatures to 95 °F (35 °C), and puts the vehicle's climate control system to use. Lasting 9.9 minutes, the 3.6-mile (5.8 km) loop averages 22 mph (35 km/h) and maximizes at a rate of 54.8 mph (88.2 km/h). Five stops are included, idling occurs 19 percent of the time and acceleration of 5.1 mph per second is achieved. Engine temperatures begin warm.

Lastly, a cold temperature cycle uses the same parameters as the current city loop, except that ambient temperature is set to 20 °F (−7 °C).

EPA tests for fuel economy do not include electrical load tests beyond climate control, which may account for some of the discrepancy between EPA and real world fuel-efficiency. A 200 W electrical load can produce a 0.4 km/l (0.94 mpg_{‑US}) reduction in efficiency on the FTP 75 cycle test.

Beginning with model year 2017, the calculation method changed to improve the accuracy of the estimated 5-cycle city and highway fuel economy values derived from just the FTP and HFET tests, with lower uncertainty for fuel efficient vehicles.

==== Electric vehicles and hybrids ====
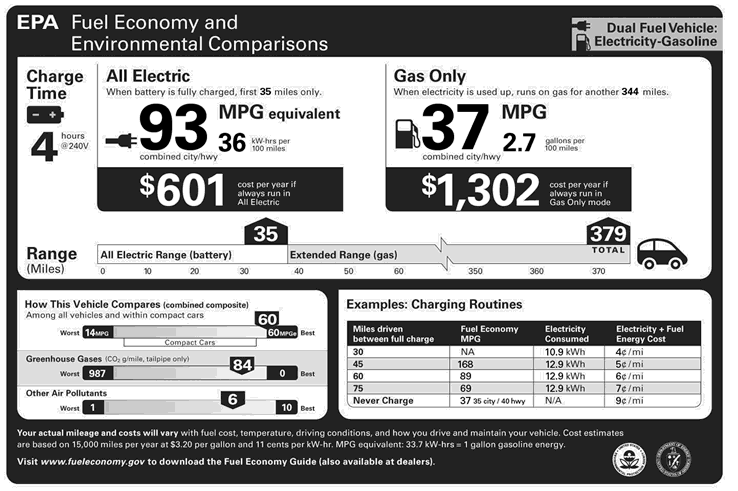
2010 Monroney sticker for a plug-in hybrid showing fuel economy in all-electric mode and gasoline-only mode

Following the efficiency claims made for vehicles such as Chevrolet Volt and Nissan Leaf, the National Renewable Energy Laboratory recommended that they use the EPA's new vehicle fuel efficiency formula that gave different values depending on fuel used. In November 2010, the EPA introduced the first fuel economy ratings in the Monroney stickers for plug-in electric vehicles.

For the fuel economy label of the Chevy Volt plug-in hybrid, the EPA rated the car separately for all-electric mode, expressed in miles per gallon gasoline equivalent (MPG-e) and for gasoline-only mode, expressed in conventional miles per gallon. The EPA also estimated an overall combined city/highway gas-electricity fuel economy rating expressed in miles per gallon gasoline equivalent (MPG-e). The label also includes a table showing fuel economy and electricity consumed for five different scenarios: 30 miles (48 km), 45 miles (72 km), 60 miles (97 km) and 75 miles (121 km) driven between a full charge, and a never charge scenario. This information was included to make the consumers aware of the variability of the fuel economy outcome depending on miles driven between charges. The fuel economy for a gasoline-only scenario (never charge) was also included. For electric-only mode, the energy consumption estimated in kWh per 100 miles (160 km) is also shown.

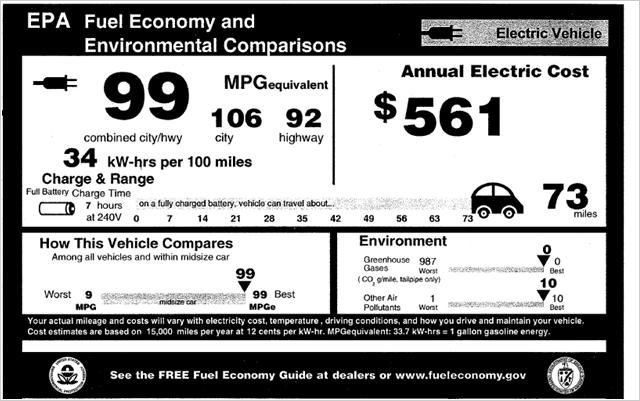
2010 Monroney label showing the EPA's combined city/highway fuel economy equivalent for an all-electric car, in this case a 2010 Nissan Leaf

For the fuel economy label of the Nissan Leaf electric car, the EPA rated the combined fuel economy in terms of miles per gallon gasoline equivalent, with a separate rating for city and highway driving. This fuel economy equivalence is based on the energy consumption estimated in kWh per 100 miles, and also shown in the Monroney label.

In May 2011, the National Highway Traffic Safety Administration (NHTSA) and EPA issued a joint final rule establishing new requirements for a fuel economy and environment label that is mandatory for all new passenger cars and trucks starting with model year 2013, and voluntary for 2012 models. The ruling includes new labels for alternative fuel and alternative propulsion vehicles available in the US market, such as plug-in hybrids, electric vehicles, flexible-fuel vehicles, hydrogen fuel cell vehicle, and natural gas vehicles. The common fuel economy metric adopted to allow the comparison of alternative fuel and advanced technology vehicles with conventional internal combustion engine vehicles is miles per gallon of gasoline equivalent (MPGe). A gallon of gasoline equivalent means the number of kilowatt-hours of electricity, cubic feet of compressed natural gas (CNG), or kilograms of hydrogen that is equal to the energy in a gallon of gasoline.

The new labels also include, for the first time, an estimate of how much fuel or electricity it takes to drive 100 miles (160 km), providing US consumers with fuel consumption per distance traveled, the metric commonly used in many other countries. The EPA explained that the objective is to avoid the traditional miles per gallon metric that can be potentially misleading when consumers compare fuel economy improvements, and is known as the "MPG illusion". This illusion arises because the reciprocal (i.e. non-linear) relationship between cost (equivalent y, volume of fuel consumed) per unit distance driven and MPG value means that differences in MPG values are not directly meaningful – only ratios are (in mathematical terms, the reciprocal function does not commute with addition and subtraction; in general, a difference in reciprocal values is not equal to the reciprocal of their difference). It has been claimed that many consumers are unaware of this, and therefore compare MPG values by subtracting them, which can give a misleading picture of relative differences in fuel economy between different pairs of vehicles – for instance, an increase from 10 to 20 MPG corresponds to a 100% improvement in fuel economy, whereas an increase from 50 to 60 MPG is only a 20% improvement, although in both cases the difference is 10 MPG. The EPA explained that the new gallons-per-100-miles metric provides a more accurate measure of fuel efficiency – notably, it is equivalent to the normal metric measurement of fuel economy, liters per 100 kilometers (L/100 km).

==== CAFE standards ====
Curve of average car mileage for model years between 1978 and 2014

The Corporate Average Fuel Economy (CAFE) regulations in the United States, first enacted by Congress in 1975, are federal regulations intended to improve the average fuel economy of cars and light trucks (trucks, vans and sport utility vehicles) sold in the US in the wake of the 1973 Arab Oil Embargo. Historically, it is the sales-weighted average fuel economy of a manufacturer's fleet of current model year passenger cars or light trucks, manufactured for sale in the United States. Under Truck CAFE standards 2008–2011 this changes to a "footprint" model where larger trucks are allowed to consume more fuel. The standards were limited to vehicles under a certain weight, but those weight classes were expanded in 2011.

==== Federal and state regulations ====
The Clean Air Act of 1970 prohibited states from establishing their own air pollution standards. However, the legislation authorized the EPA to grant a waiver to California, allowing the state to set higher standards. The law provides a “piggybacking” provision that allows other states to adopt vehicle emission limits that are the same as California's. California's waivers were routinely granted until 2007, when the George W. Bush administration rejected the state's bid to adopt global warming pollution limits for cars and light trucks. California and 15 other states that were trying to put in place the same emissions standards sued in response. The case was tied up in court until the Obama administration reversed the policy in 2009 by granting the waiver.

In August 2012, President Obama announced new standards for American-made automobiles of an average of 54.5 miles per gallon by the year 2025. In April 2018, EPA Administrator Scott Pruitt announced that the Trump administration planned to roll back the 2012 federal standards and would also seek to curb California's authority to set its own standards. Although the Trump administration was reportedly considering a compromise to allow state and national standards to stay in place, on 21 February 2019 the White House declared that it had abandoned these negotiations. A government report subsequently found that, in 2019, new light-duty vehicle fuel economy fell 0.2 miles per gallon (to 24.9 miles per gallon) and pollution increased 3 grams per mile traveled (to 356 grams per mile). A decrease in fuel economy and an increase in pollution had not occurred for the previous five years. The Obama-era rule was officially rolled back on 31 March 2020 during the Trump administration, but the rollback was reversed on 20 December 2021 during the Biden administration.

== Fuel economy of trucks ==
Trucks are usually bought as an investment good. They are meant to earn money. As the diesel fuel burnt in heavy trucks accounts for around 30% of the total costs for a freight forwarding company there is always a lot of interest in both the haulage industry and the truck builder industry to strive for best fuel economy. For truck buyers the fuel economy measured by standard procedures is only a first guideline. Professional trucking companies measure the fuel economy of their trucks and truck fleets in real usage. Fuel economy of trucks in real usage is determined by four important factors: The truck technology that is constantly improved by the various OEMs. The driver's driving style contributes a lot to the real fuel economy (different from the test cycles where a standard driving style is used). The maintenance condition of the vehicle influences the fuel efficiency – again different from standardized procedures where the trucks are always presented in flawless condition. Last but not least the usage of the vehicle influences the fuel consumption: Hilly roads and heavy loads will increase the fuel consumption of a vehicle.

== Effect on pollution ==
Fuel efficiency directly affects emissions causing pollution by affecting the amount of fuel used. However, it also depends on the fuel source used to drive the vehicle concerned. Cars for example, can run on a number of fuel types other than gasoline, such as natural gas, LPG or biofuel or electricity which creates various quantities of atmospheric pollution.

A kilogram of carbon, whether contained in petrol, diesel, kerosene, or any other hydrocarbon fuel in a vehicle, leads to approximately 3.6 kg of CO_{2} emissions. Due to the carbon content of gasoline, its combustion emits 2.3 kg/l (19.2 lb/US gal) of CO_{2}; since diesel fuel is more energy dense per unit volume, diesel emits 2.6 kg/l (22 lb/US gal). This figure is only the CO_{2} emissions of the final fuel product and does not include additional CO_{2} emissions created during the drilling, pumping, transportation and refining steps required to produce the fuel. Additional measures to reduce overall emission includes improvements to the efficiency of air conditioners, lights and tires.

== Unit conversions ==
US gallons

- 1 mpg ≈ 0.425 km/L
- 235.2/mpg ≈ L/100 km
- 1 mpg ≈ 1.201 mpg (imp)

Imperial gallons

- 1 mpg ≈ 0.354 km/L
- 282/mpg ≈ L/100 km
- 1 mpg ≈ 0.833 mpg (US)

=== Conversion from mpg ===
mpg (imp)	mpg (US)	km/L	L/100 km
5	4.2	1.8	56.5
10	8.3	3.5	28.2
15	12.5	5.3	18.8
20	16.7	7.1	14.1
25	20.8	8.9	11.3
30	25.0	10.6	9.4
35	29.1	12.4	8.1
40	33.3	14.2	7.1
45	37.5	15.9	6.3
50	41.6	17.7	5.6
55	45.8	19.5	5.1
60	50.0	21.2	4.7
65	54.1	23.0	4.3
70	58.3	24.8	4.0
75	62.5	26.6	3.8
80	66.6	28.3	3.5
85	70.8	30.1	3.3
90	74.9	31.9	3.1
95	79.1	33.6	3.0
100	83.3	35.4	2.8

mpg (US)	mpg (imp)	km/L	L/100 km
5	6.0	2.1	47.0
10	12.0	4.3	23.5
15	18.0	6.4	15.7
20	24.0	8.5	11.8
25	30.0	10.6	9.4
30	36.0	12.8	7.8
35	42.0	14.9	6.7
40	48.0	17.0	5.9
45	54.0	19.1	5.2
50	60.0	21.3	4.7
55	66.1	23.4	4.3
60	72.1	25.5	3.9
65	78.1	27.6	3.6
70	84.1	29.8	3.4
75	90.1	31.9	3.1
80	96.1	34.0	2.9
85	102.1	36.1	2.8
90	108.1	38.3	2.6
95	114.1	40.4	2.5
100	120.1	42.5	2.4

=== Conversion from km/L and L/100 km ===
L/100 km	km/L	mpg (US)	mpg (imp)
1	100.0	235.2	282.5
2	50.0	117.6	141.2
3	33.3	78.4	94.2
4	25.0	58.8	70.6
5	20.0	47.0	56.5
6	16.7	39.2	47.1
7	14.3	33.6	40.4
8	12.5	29.4	35.3
9	11.1	26.1	31.4
10	10.0	23.5	28.2
15	6.7	15.7	18.8
20	5.0	11.8	14.1
25	4.0	9.4	11.3
30	3.3	7.8	9.4
35	2.9	6.7	8.1
40	2.5	5.9	7.1
45	2.2	5.2	6.3
50	2.0	4.7	5.6
55	1.8	4.3	5.1
60	1.7	3.9	4.7

km/L	L/100 km	mpg (US)	mpg (imp)
5	20.0	11.8	14.1
10	10.0	23.5	28.2
15	6.7	35.3	42.4
20	5.0	47.0	56.5
25	4.0	58.8	70.6
30	3.3	70.6	84.7
35	2.9	82.3	98.9
40	2.5	94.1	113.0
45	2.2	105.8	127.1
50	2.0	117.6	141.2
55	1.8	129.4	155.4
60	1.7	141.1	169.5
65	1.5	152.9	183.6
70	1.4	164.7	197.7
75	1.3	176.4	211.9
80	1.3	188.2	226.0
85	1.2	199.9	240.1
90	1.1	211.7	254.2
95	1.1	223.5	268.4
100	1.0	235.2	282.5

== See also ==
- Automobile costs
- ACEA agreement
- Battery electric vehicle
- Car speed and energy consumption
- Car tuning
- Climate crisis
- Emission standard
- Energy conservation
- Energy-efficient driving
- FF layout
- Fuel efficiency in transportation
- Fuel saving devices
- Gasoline gallon equivalent
- Motorized quadricycle (vehicles with low power engines/low top speed)
- Miles per gallon gasoline equivalent
- Passenger miles per gallon
- The Very Light Car
- Vehicle Efficiency Initiative
- Vehicle metrics
- Green vehicle
- Low-carbon economy
- Low-rolling resistance tires
- Microcar
- Plug-in hybrid
