= Energy Tax Act =

1978 American conservation legislation

Energy Tax Act of 1978
- Long title: An Act to provide tax incentives for the production and conservation of energy, and for other purposes.
- Enacted by: the 95th United States Congress

Citations
- Public law: Pub. L. 95–618
- Statutes at Large: 92 Stat. 3174

Legislative history
- Introduced in the House as H.R. 5263 by Dan Rostenkowski (D‑IL 8th) on March 21, 1977; Passed the House on July 18, 1977; Passed the Senate on October 31, 1977; Signed into law by President Jimmy Carter on November 9, 1978

The Energy Tax Act (Pub. L. 95–618, 92 Stat. 3174, enacted November 9, 1978) is a law passed by the United States Congress as part of the National Energy Act. The objective of this law, passed during the 1970s energy crisis, was to reduce demand for oil and gas supply by promoting fuel efficiency and renewable energy through taxes and tax credits.

== Tax credits for conservation ==
This law gave an income tax credit to private residents who use solar, wind, or geothermal sources of energy. The credit is equal to 30% of the cost of the equipment up to $2000, as well as 20% of costs greater than $2000, up to a maximum of $10,000. There were also tax credits to businesses for renewable energy equipment, amounting to a maximum of 25% of the cost of the equipment.

The renewable energy credits of this law were increased by the Crude Oil Windfall Profits Tax Act of 1980.

== Gas Guzzler Tax ==
The Act also created the Gas Guzzler Tax which applies to the sales of vehicles with official EPA-estimated gas mileage below certain specified levels. In 1980, the tax was $200 for a fuel efficiency of 14 to 15 miles per gallon, and was increased to $1800 in 1985. In 1980, the tax was $550 for fuel efficiencies of 13 mpg and below, and was changed in 1986 to $3,850 for ratings below 12.5 mpg. The Gas Guzzler Tax applies only to passenger cars. Trucks, sport utility vehicles (SUV), and minivans are not covered because these vehicle types were not widely available in 1978 and were rarely used for non-commercial purposes. The tax is collected by the Internal Revenue Service (IRS) and normally paid by the manufacturer or importer. The following chart shows the current tax for various levels of MPG that have been in effect since January 1, 1991.

Share defined as car or light truck

Unadjusted MPG (combined)	Tax
at least 22.5	No tax
at least 21.5, but less than 22.5	$1000
at least 20.5, but less than 21.5	$1300
at least 19.5, but less than 20.5	$1700
at least 18.5, but less than 19.5	$2100
at least 17.5, but less than 18.5	$2600
at least 16.5, but less than 17.5	$3000
at least 15.5, but less than 16.5	$3700
at least 14.5, but less than 15.5	$4500
at least 13.5, but less than 14.5	$5400
at least 12.5, but less than 13.5	$6400
less than 12.5	$7700

The combined fuel economy MPG value (55% city, 45% highway) is used to determine tax liability. The MPG value is also adjusted slightly to account for differences in test procedures made since the base year, but it is not adjusted for in-use short fall. The unadjusted combined MPG of a vehicle can be approximated from the city and highway values provided in the Fuel Economy Guide by the following equation:

$$\mathrm{Unadjusted MPG (combined)} = \frac{\mathrm{1}}{\mathrm{ \frac{\mathrm{.495}}{\mathrm{City MPG}} + \frac{\mathrm{.351}}{\mathrm{Highway MPG}} }} + .15$$

Since this is an approximate calculation, the actual gas guzzler tax may be off by one tax bracket.

We can then find out how much penalty, $\mathit{p_t}$, the manufacturer has to pay for that particular vehicle by using the following equation. $\mathit{p_i}$ needs to be looked up on the table above and $\mathit{q_i}$ is the numbers of cars that are found to be under the set Gas Guzzler standard,

$p_{t}=\sum_{i}{p_iq_i}\,$

=== Economic impact ===
Gas guzzler tax creates incentive to meet the minimum MPG requirement by manufacturer. Due to elimination of vehicles that are below 22.5 mpg_{‑US} (10.5 L/100 km; 27.0 mpg_{‑imp}), vehicle sales have decreased approximately 0.5 percent. However, sales revenues increase by a greater amount due to the added value in vehicles making greater use of fuel economy technology.

Manufacturers benefit from the increase in price of products. However, the fuel sector may lose revenue if the increase in sales and production of fuel efficient vehicles doesn't just encourage people to drive more.

=== Market impact ===
The Gas Guzzler Tax led to the successive downsizing of most major American passenger autos, and the combination of the tax and late-'70s/early-'80s economic woes effectively killed the American full-size car as it had been known up to that point. It only took one product cycle before the first modern SUVs were introduced, the Cherokee XJ and the S-10 Blazer (in 1984). By the time Ford introduced the Explorer, the SUV had become the common person's luxury vehicle and Ford capitalized on this using extensive cross-marketing, most notably with Northwest clothier Eddie Bauer.

Critics of the Gas Guzzler Tax contend that the increased fuel economy of the US passenger car fleet observed since 1978 must be considered in the context of the increased market share of mid-size and full-size SUVs. Many consumers' stated reasons for SUV purchase (comfort, interior room, and a perception of safety based on the vehicle's size) also apply to the now-obsolete American full-size car as produced from the 1920s through the 70s; critics contend that the dominance of the modern SUV is a direct result of the Gas Guzzler Tax, which could have applied to all consumer vehicles but does not.

== See also ==
- Energy law - United States
- Vehicle Efficiency Initiative
