= EcoAuto =

Canadian government automobile program

The EcoAuto Rebate Program was a Canadian government program administered by Transport Canada to provide incentive to people to buy fuel-efficient vehicles, to protect the environment, through rebates. The program applied to vehicles purchased between March 20, 2007, and December 31, 2008. The EcoAuto Program affected eligible cars from 2006 to 2008.

It was part of the Canadian government's overall Vehicle Efficiency Incentive (VEI), which also included a levy or excise tax on vehicles deemed to be fuel-inefficient and the Retire Your Ride Scrappage Program.

== Background ==
The EcoAuto Rebate Program was created to give consumers an incentive into buying a more fuel-efficient car. The EcoAuto program along with the Green Levy, a levy placed on less fuel-efficient vehicles, also wanted to make give companies a reason to start making more fuel efficient cars before the fuel efficient standards were enforced in 2011. All rebates that were offered ranged from $1,000 to $2,000. All of the rebates were paid for by the $4.5 billion budgeted to environmental initiatives. The EcoAuto program was terminated at the end of 2008. The reason for the end of the rebate program was due to concerns of companies, like Toyota and Honda, who believed that the rebates did not account for safety of the vehicle and penalized vehicles that were safer. Another reason for the decline of the program was the issue of the money as a rebate. A rebate can only be applied to the taxes paid, so if you were to trade in a vehicle, you might not receive the full rebate. One of the final issues was the issue of people buying the wrong car. In Canada, people found that with the incentive of the rebate, these cars would be better long-term; however, people were realizing that trading in a minivan for a smaller car with incentives was a very bad choice. People soon realized that as good as the incentives seemed, they still needed to be what they needed in a car.

== Eligibility ==
Eligibility for incentives depends on the type of vehicle. Transport Canada determined that to receive rebates, owners must either buy or enter a long-term lease (12 months or more) on a vehicle. The combined mileage, based on the type of vehicle, has to meet the requirements in the table, or be less than the listed value.

Eligibility
Type of Vehicle	Combined Mileage (L/km)	Combined Mileage (gal/mi)
Car (Sedan or Coupe)	6.5L / 100 km	1.72 gal / 62.14 mi
Sport Utility Vehicles (SUV)	8.3L / 100 km	2.19 gal / 62.14 mi
Flexible-fuel vehicles (E85)	13L / 100 km	3.44 gal / 62.14 mi

=== List of eligible vehicles (2006-2008) ===
==== Brand ====
- Model - $ Maximum Rebate

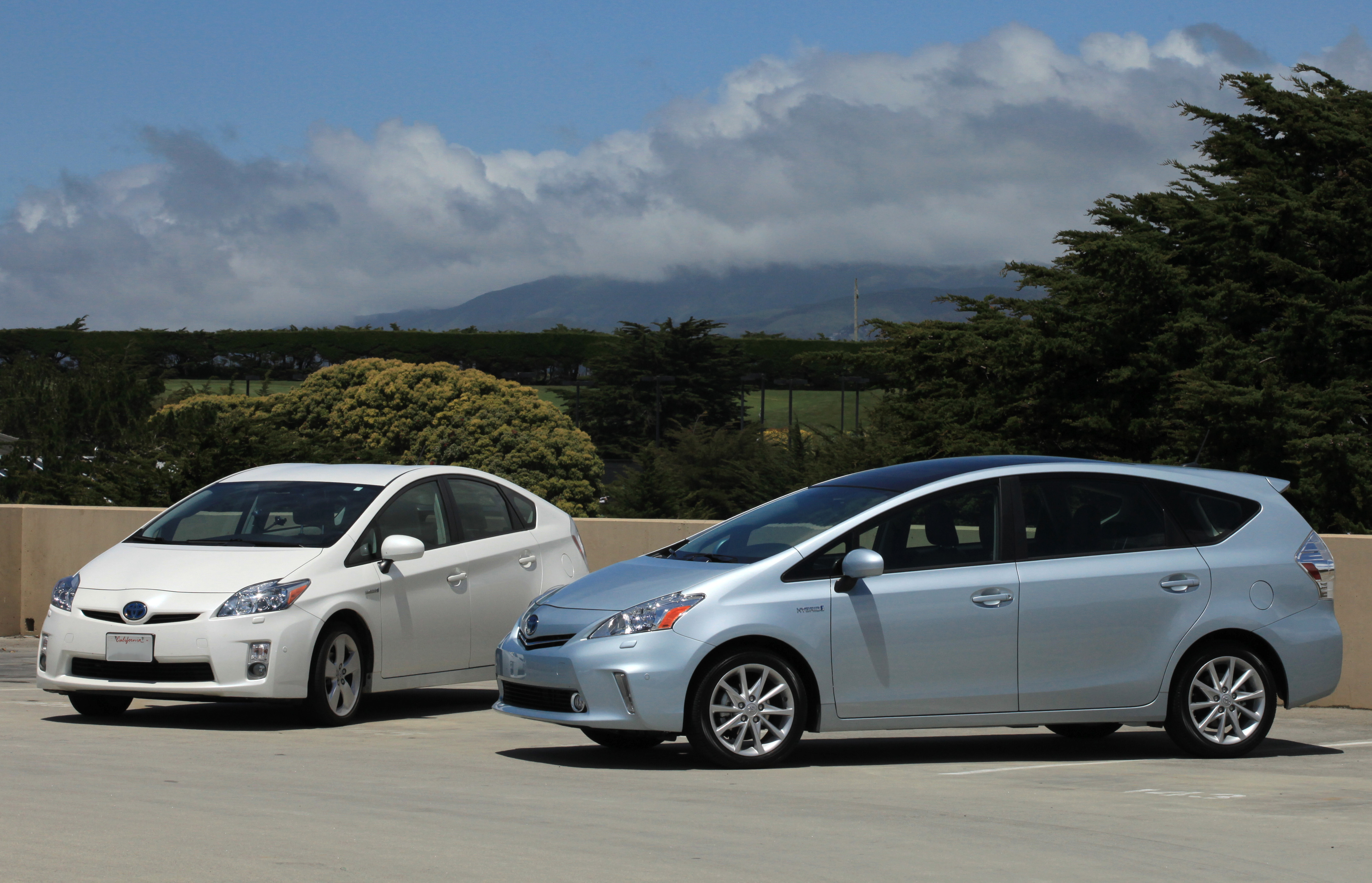
Hybrid cars with improved fuel efficiency

==== Toyota ====
- Prius - $2,000
- Camry Hybrid - $1,500
- Corolla - $1,000
- Highlander Hybrid 4X4 - $1,000
- Yaris - $1,000

==== Ford ====
- Escape HEV - $2,000
- Escape HEV 4X4 - $1,500

==== Honda ====
- Civic Hybrid - $2,000

==== Nissan ====
- Altima Hybrid - $1,500

==== Jeep ====
- Compass - $1,000
- Patriot - $1,000

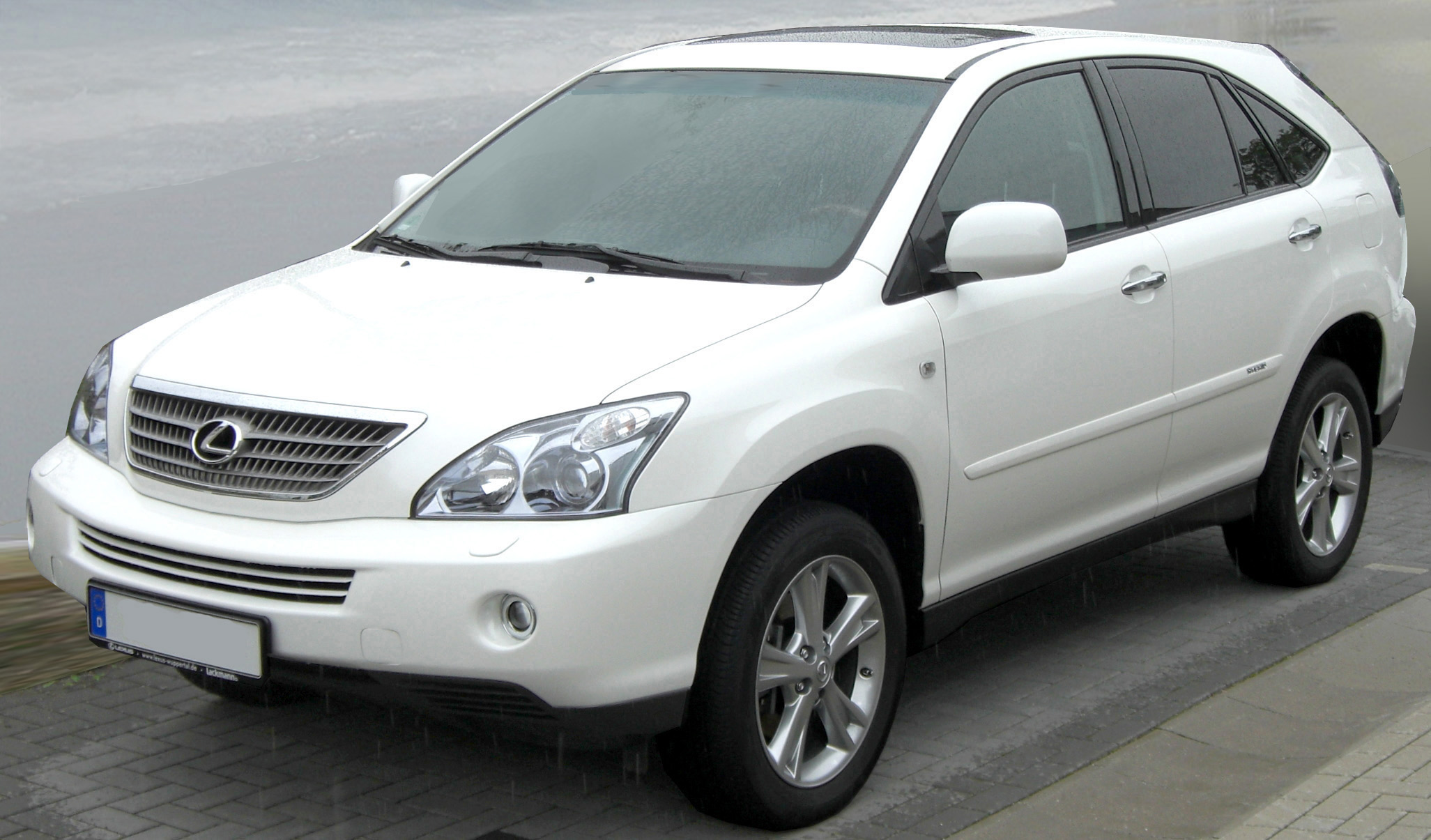
Lexus RX 400H (SUV)

==== Lexus ====
- RX 400H - $1,000
- RX 400H 4X4 - $1,500

==== Mini Cooper ====
- Mini Cooper - $1,000

==== Saturn ====
- VUE Hybrid - $1,000

==== Chevrolet ====
- Impala FFV - $1,000
- Monte Carlo FFV - $1,000

==== Chrysler ====
- Sebring FFV - $1,000

===== Mercedes-Benz =====
- Smart Fortwo CDI Coupe (Diesel) - $2,000
- Smart Fortwo CDI Cabriolet (Diesel) - $2,000

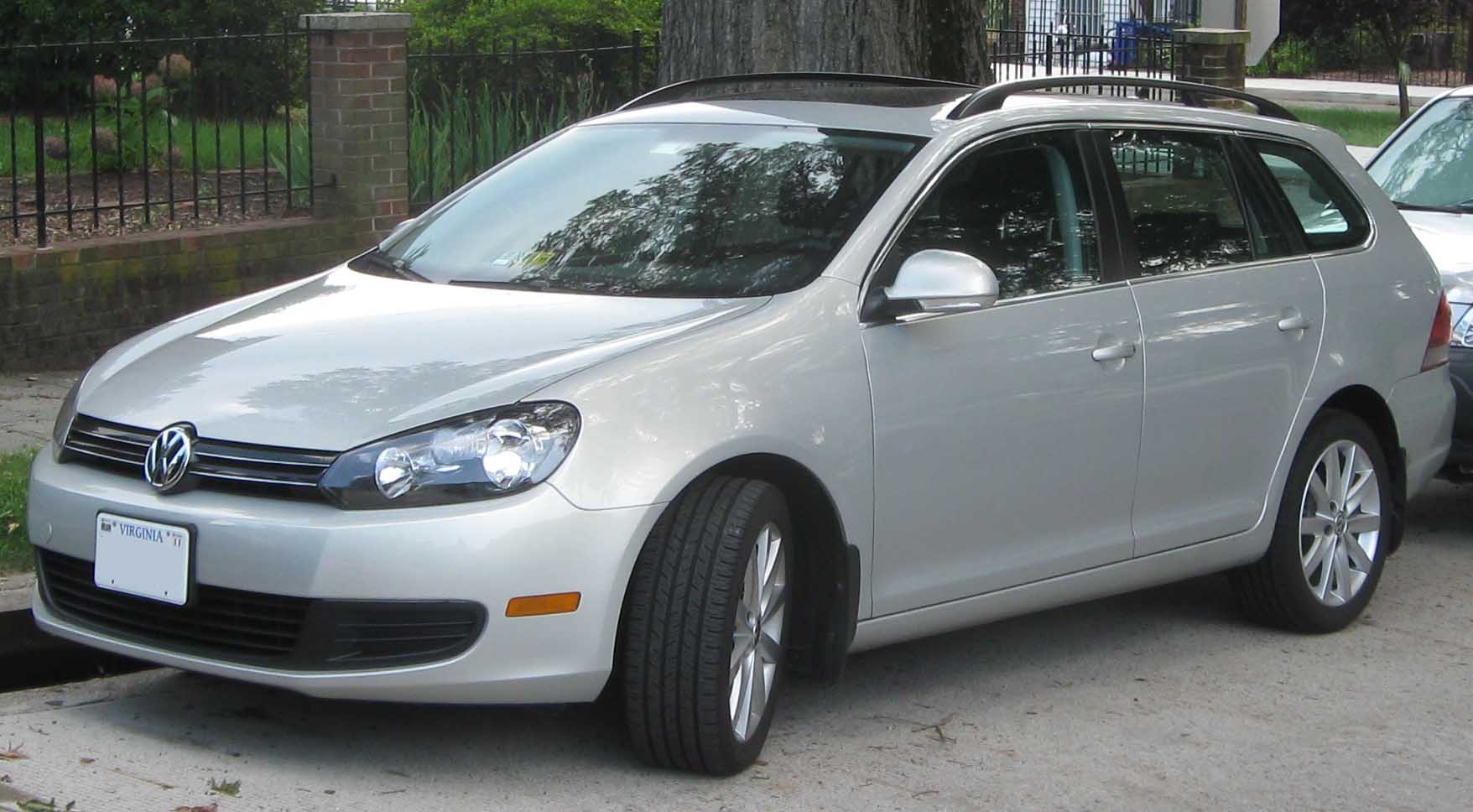
Jetta TDI Wagon (Flex Fuel)

==== Volkswagen ====
- New Beetle TDI (Diesel) - $2,000
- Golf TDI (Diesel) - $2,000
- Jetta TDI (Diesel) - $1,500
- Jetta Wagon TDI (Diesel) - $1,500
