= Vehicle scrappage scheme =

British government incentive scheme

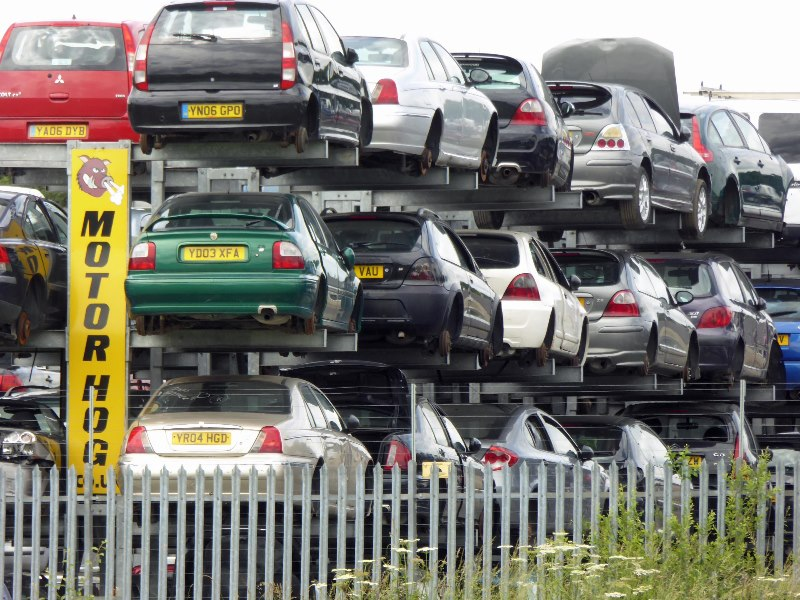
A group of 2000s era vehicles to be scrapped

The vehicle scrappage scheme (also vehicle discount scheme and car scrappage scheme) is a government incentive scheme that was introduced in the 2009 United Kingdom Budget to encourage British motorists to purchase a new, more environmentally-friendly car or van and scrap an older, more polluting one that they have owned for more than twelve months. The scheme was extended in September 2009 and again in February 2010 and it finished at the end of March 2010. In February 2010, a separate Plug-in Car Grant to provide £5,000 towards the cost of electric vehicles was announced and it began in January 2011.

== Overview ==
The initial scheme, costing the British Government £300,000,000 was introduced in 2009 to support the replacement of 300,000 cars purchased.

The Government agreed to provide a £1,000 payment towards the purchase of a new car ordered from participating manufacturers after 23 April 2009 and first registered on or after 16 May 2009. to UK residents who also scrap a car that they have owned for more than twelve months, was older than ten years and manufacturers agreed to also provide £1,000 off the list price.

Environmental groups were "angered" that the scheme was not limited to economical cars, while classic car enthusiasts expressed concerns about the potential decimation of surviving numbers of some of the rarest models in the country, many of which would have been off the road for years and thus not polluting anyway. The RAC Foundation said that many scrapped cars would be still be in good condition and an estimated 90% of cars purchased under the scheme would be imported. Many cars are already discounted from list price so the saving to purchasers is in reality, less than £2,000.

The Institute for Fiscal Studies criticised the scheme, saying that:

- A reduction of emissions per mile from newer cars would be offset by new vehicles being driven more.
- There would be significant environmental costs associated with the production of new vehicles.
- As fiscal stimulus, it would only benefit one industry.
- Many new cars are not produced in the UK, though some foreign-built vehicles will contain British components.
- A larger part of the subsidy would go to replacements that would have occurred anyway.
- It would mean that fewer sales would be made after the economy has picked up.

The number of new cars sold increased during the scheme, and figures for February 2010 were 26% higher than the previous year. There were concerns that sales would reduce after the end of the scheme and the end of the reduced VAT rate of 15%.

The average emissions of new cars sold during the scheme dropped 5.4% from the year before.

In March 2010, What Car magazine claimed that the scheme had been a "smoke-screen" behind which manufactures increased prices and that "some of the price rises take your breath away".

In February 2010, the Government announced a £230,000,000 "Plug-in Car Grant" scheme to provide a £5,000 grant towards the purchase of plug-in electric cars—the scheme started in January 2011 and a separate scheme, "Plugged-In Places" provided some 11,000 charging points in selected UK cities over the next three years. There was also talk of a scrappage scheme for old radios ahead of the planned analogue TV switch-off.

== History ==
A car scrappage scheme was introduced in Germany on 13 February 1999 and then in France and Italy. Following a record fall in car sales in the UK and associated redundancies accompanied by lobbying by the Society of Motor Manufacturers and Traders on behalf of UK car manufacturers with support from the UK scheme was introduced in the 2009 United Kingdom Budget on 22 April 2009 by the Chancellor of the Exchequer, Alistair Darling. The scheme was supported by Peter Mandelson, Secretary of State for Business, Innovation and Skills, and Geoff Hoon, Secretary of State for Transport.

In September 2009, a further £100,000,000 was made available to the scheme which was extended until the end of February 2010. The scheme had been due to run out of money during October and varies bodies including Engineering Employers' Federation, Unite and the Society of Motor Manufacturers and Traders had lobbied for an extension which was announced by Mandelson at the 2009 Labour Party conference in Brighton.

On 5 February 2010, the scheme was extended by a month to run until the end of March 2010 or until the funds were exhausted. During the same month, the Government announced a £230,000,000 "Plug-in Car Grant" scheme to provide a £5,000 grant towards the purchase of plug-in electric cars, to begin in January 2011. A separate scheme, "Plugged-In Places", would provide some 11,000 charging points in selected UK cities over the next three years.

== See also ==
- Cash for Clunkers — an analogous scheme in the United States
- Parable of the broken window
- Scrappage program
