= Homestar =

Homestar or HOME STAR may refer to:

- HOME STAR, a proposed 2009 American government energy efficiency incentive plan
- Homestar, a fictional character in Homestar Runner
- Homestar, the home edition of the Megastar projector
