= Vehicle Efficiency Initiative =

The Vehicle Efficiency Incentive (VEI) was introduced in the 2007 Canadian federal government budget, aimed at promoting fuel-efficient vehicles. The VEI took effect on March 20, 2007, and it included a performance-based rebate program offering up to $2,000 for the purchase of a new fuel-efficient vehicle, a neutral treatment of a broad range of vehicles with average fuel efficiency that were widely purchased by Canadians, and a new Green Levy on fuel-inefficient vehicles.

The rebate program, eventually called ecoAUTO Rebate Program, initially offered $1,000 for new automobiles with a combined fuel consumption rating of 6.5 L/100 km (43.5 mpg) or better and minivans, sport utility vehicles (SUVs) & other light trucks with fuel consumption of 8.3 L/100 km (34 mpg) or better, calculated based on a combined 55 per cent city and 45 per cent highway rating. An additional $500 was offered for each half litre per 100 km improvement in the combined fuel-efficiency rating of the vehicle below these thresholds, for a maximum total of $2,000. The ecoAUTO rebate program applied to 2006, 2007 and 2008 model-year vehicles purchased or leased (12 months or more) between March 20, 2007 and December 31, 2008. All applications must have been received by March 31, 2009.

A Green Levy was charged for new passenger vehicles (excluding trucks) with fuel-efficiency ratings of 13.0 L/100 km (21.7 mpg) or worse. The incentive structure will include a new Green Levy on these types of vehicles, payable by the manufacturer or importer when the vehicles are delivered into the Canadian market. The fuel-efficiency rating is calculated based on the same criteria as the rebate program above. The Green Levy will start at $1,000 for passenger vehicles with combined fuel-efficiency ratings of at between 13.0 L/100 km and 14.0 L/100 km (20.2 mpg), and increase in $1,000 increments for each full litre per 100 km increase in the combined fuel-efficiency rating above the 13.0 L/100 km floor, to a maximum of $4,000, for vehicles with ratings of 16.0 L/100 km (17.7 mpg) or worse.

In addition to the incentives and levies, the Canadian Federal Budget of 2007 provided $6 million over the next two years for a seven-fold increase in annual federal support delivered through Environment Canada for scrappage programs, and it provided for $30 million over the next two years for incentives to be designed by Environment Canada and Transport Canada in consultation with stakeholders that will remove older, high-emitting vehicles from Canadian roads.

== Criticisms ==
According to auto industry analyst Dennis DesRosiers, large SUV buyers reacted to the VEI by buying pickups, which are exempted from the extra tax.

A study by the conservative C.D. Howe Institute questioned the effectiveness of the program. Specifically, their study claimed that the program did not affect the majority of vehicles, that the Canadian government failed to adequately consult the industry and did not phase in the policy, which hurt the market share of the Big Three North American automakers, and that the program was ineffective in reducing greenhouse gases.

== Financial costs ==
For the ecoAUTO program, the Canadian Federal government allocated $160 million over 2 fiscal years beginning in 2007. The government spent $116 million in 2007-2008, and allocated $102.7 million for fiscal year 2008-2009.
