= Scrappage program =

Government incentive program

A scrappage program is a government incentive program to promote the replacement of old vehicles with modern vehicles. Scrappage programs generally have the dual aim of stimulating the automobile industry and removing inefficient, more polluting vehicles from the road. Many European countries introduced large-scale scrappage programs as an economic stimulus to increase market demand in the industrial sector during the global recession that began in 2008.

Scrappage programs were touted with different names, mostly referring to an environmental benefit. The Vehicle Efficiency Incentive in Canada was based on fuel efficiency of cars. In Romania, this program was called "Rabla" (the wreck), and was launched by Dacia in 2000. In Germany, the economic stimulus program was called "Umweltprämie" (environmental premium) and in Austria "Ökoprämie" (eco-premium) while most of the public referred to it simply as "Abwrackprämie" (scrappage premium). Other countries have not tried to connect the program title with an environment aspect – still the Italian "Incentivi alla rottamazione" (scrappage incentives) and French "Prime à la conversion" (scrappage premium) require the new car to meet modern emission standards. The German scrappage incentive scheme and the British scrappage scheme do not have such requirements, and the UK scheme was openly sketched on the target to provide financial support to the struggling motor industry. Similarly, the United States Congress devised a scrappage scheme, commonly referred to as "cash for clunkers," as part of a general Automotive Stimulus package series; however, the voucher is only given when the newer car has a better fuel efficiency compared to the old car.

In the 1990s, many countries had introduced tax rebate programs for new cars that meet a modern emission standard, but, with the Kyoto Protocol; some countries made the public offer dependent on the scrappage of old cars.

Other programs with the same goal of stimulating industry and increasing efficiency include the Cash for Caulkers plan to promote replacing old refrigerators, air conditioners, etc. with newer, more efficient appliances.

== Approaches by country ==
=== Austria ===
The scrappage scheme in Austria was introduced on 1 April 2009, and it allowed customers a grant in cash of €1,500 if the car was older than thirteen years and the new car would meet the Euro-4 emission criteria. There was a limit of 30,000 cars up until December 2009.

=== Canada ===
The Retire Your Ride program, administered by the Canadian Government, allows Canadian residents to trade in a vehicle manufactured in 1995 or earlier for a wide range of rewards, such as: a public transit pass or C$300.

=== China ===
In June 2009, a nationwide scrappage program was implemented, which offered rebates of $450–$900 for trading in older, heavy polluting cars and trucks for new ones until 31 May 2010. The program was expected to substitute 2,700,000 more polluting vehicles from the roads.

Eligible vehicles included: used minivans, small and mid-size trucks and other mid-size passenger cars that no longer meet the emissions standards set by the Chinese Government. In addition, the Shanghai local government offered similar incentives of $450 to $1,100 per vehicle to its residents who traded in older vehicles; allowing the total subsidy to be as much as $2,000.

After meeting with little success in the first few months, the government raised the compensation to 5,000–18,000 Yuan, or about US$732-US$2,632, for each qualified vehicle at the end of 2009. In June 2010, it was announced that the program would be extended until the end of 2010.

=== France ===
The scrappage scheme in France was introduced on 19 January 2009, where the old car would need to be older than ten years and the new car would have needed to meet a particular CO_{2} emission standard – it started with €1,000 for a car with less than 160 g/km. This was added up for even better emission standards (€5,000 for cars with less than 60 g/km – effectively one electric vehicle) and a "super-bonus" for the scrappage of the old car.

French car manufacturers are availing of this scheme for new car purchases in Ireland as well, so Irish customers that purchase new French cars can avail of a grant from both the French Government and Irish Governments.

The program was replaced by a new program called « Prime à la conversion » in 2017 which broaden grant eligibility to used cars. It requires cars to emit less than 130g/km of CO_{2}.

=== Germany ===
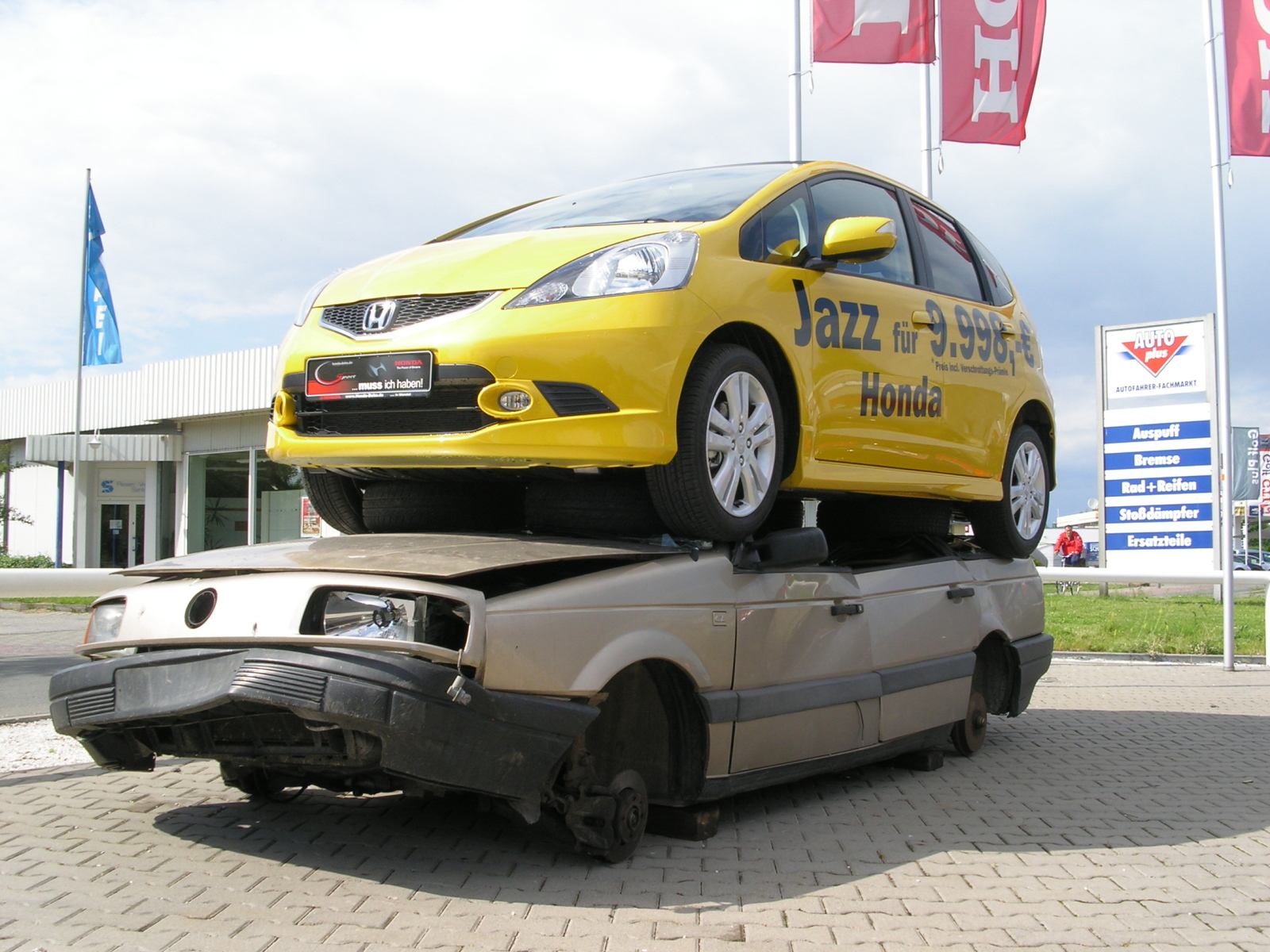
A new Honda Jazz on the wreck of a VW Passat: "9,998€ incl. Verschrottungs-Prämie" in Germany, 2009

The 2009 scrappage scheme of Germany has been the largest so far, being a part of the 2009 stabilization policy "Konjunkturpaket II". Following the 2008–2010 automotive industry crisis, with the 2009 German federal election planned for 27 September 2009, every private person that has been owner for at least one year of a car that was at least nine years old was entitled for a scrappage premium of €2,500 (then U$3,320), colloquially called "Abwrackprämie" ('wreck rebate') when buying a new car that was compliant to vehicle emission standard "Euro 4". The old cars, supposedly worth less than €2,500, had to be demolished, rather than exported to other countries where they would continue to pollute, with the original papers sent in with the application.

When launched on 13 January 2009, the program was limited to at most 600,000 cars and a budget of €1,500,000,000. However, the car market boomed with an unexpected increase of 40% (March 2009 compared to March 2008) in sales making the program too short running to offer more than a short-term stimulus – estimates showed that the program fund would be depleted by May. In March, a German think tank estimated that the net impact of the program on the German budget will be €2,500,000,000. On 25 March 2009, the German Government decided to continue the scrappage scheme until the end of year, earmarking €5,000,000,000. This amount lasted only until September 2, the program was discontinued accordingly.

The impact on automakers has been varied. Ford has benefited from high sales of the Fiesta which was made in Cologne, plus the imports Ka and Fusion — together up 56% in April 2009 from a year before. However, those who can afford the luxury German models of BMW, Mercedes-Benz, and Porsche with prices over €50,000 have had little benefit from only €2,500, unlike customers of cheaper, smaller cars.

German authorities discovered an illicit scheme through which an estimated (by the Federation of German Detectives) 50,000 supposedly scrapped vehicles had been exported to Africa and Eastern Europe. In contrast with the U.S. Cash for Clunkers Program which requires dealers to destroy old engines by draining the motor oil and injecting instead sodium silicate, the German program only required the scrapped vehicles to be sent to junkyards, with papers that are easy to falsify, thus "allowing" the illegal exports to occur.

=== Italy ===
In Italy there was a scrappage scheme from 1 January 2007 to 31 December 2008, that allowed for €700 plus a tax rebate. A new scrappage scheme was put in place in 2009. New cars must comply at minimum with Euro 4 + emit a maximum of 130 g/km (diesel) or 140 g/km (other fuels) of CO_{2}. The Scrapping incentive for cars was €1,500 but could be combined with purchase incentive of €1,500 for a new car running on CNG, electricity or hydrogen (increased to €3,000 if it emits exactly 120 g/km and to €3,500 if it emitted less than 120 g/km). The purchase incentive for a new car running on LPG is €1,500, increased to €2,000 if the car emits less than 120 g/km. This could also be combined with the scrapping incentive. The scrappage program ended in December 2009 with delivery of vehicles completed by March 2010.

=== Ireland ===
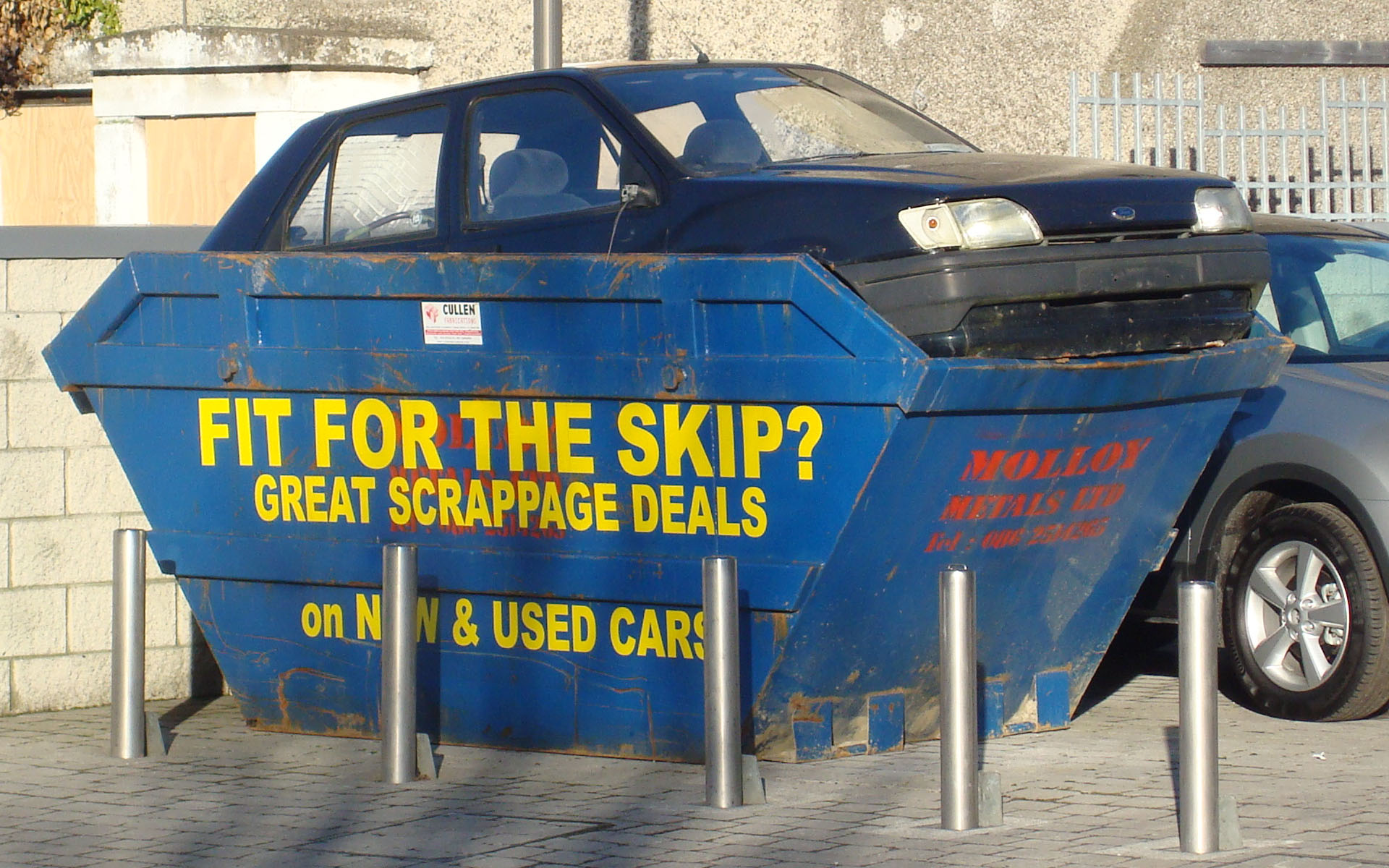
A skip advertising a scrappage service, 2010

The Republic of Ireland introduced a scrappage scheme for a second time on 10 December 2009 which offered €1,500 for cars ten years or older. The discount was on the Vehicle Registration Tax and could only be used on cars that had emissions that did not exceed 140g/km. In 2010, the scheme value was reduced to €1,250 per scrapped car and the end date for the scheme was set for 30 June 2011. The first-ever scrappage scheme ran in the early-1990s.

=== India ===
The government of India in Union Budget 2021, has introduced Voluntary Vehicle Scrappage Policy to eliminate the inefficient and polluting vehicles. According to the policy, private vehicles above 20 years and commercial vehicles above 15 years will have to undergo fitness test at authorized fitness center. Only those vehicles are that are deemed to be fit will be allowed to run, and rest will be sent in vehicle scrap yard. The government has also planning to introduce "Green Tax" under which transport vehicles older than 8 years will be charged a Green Tax at the time of renewal of fitness certificate, at the rate of 10–25% of road tax.

Earlier entrepreneurs were reluctant to enter vehicle scrappage business in India, but with the formal introduction of vehicle scrappage policy, automobile recycling industry in India will get giant boost.

Apart from the voluntary vehicle scrappage policy, India also has a mandatory vehicle scrappage policy which is applicable in National capital region (NCR), where in any diesel vehicle older then 10yr and patrol vehicles older then 15yr can not ply in the region.

=== Japan ===
Japan introduced a program from 1 April 2009 until 31 March 2010 (or until the budget was exhausted), which offered up to JP¥250,000 (~US$2,500) to trade in vehicles thirteen years of age or older for newer, more environmentally friendly cars; according to environmental performance criteria established by the Japanese Government. The purchasing rebate was JP¥125,000 (~US$1,250) if trading for a mini or kei car, which already receives preferential tax treatment, built to specifications defined by law in Japan that place limits on size engine displacement and power. The Japanese government also included a tax break on gasoline-electric hybrid vehicles and other low emission cars and trucks, allocating $3,700,000,000 for the program.

=== Luxembourg ===
In Luxembourg, a scrappage scheme was introduced in January 2009 that allowed for a premium if the old car was older than ten years and the new car to meet CO_{2} < 150 g/km (€1,500) or CO_{2} < 120 g/km (€2,500).

=== The Netherlands ===
The Dutch Government provides a premium of €750 or €1,000 in association with the car industry. The city of Amsterdam provides an additional premium of between €250 and €1,000.

=== Norway ===
In Norway a "Vehicle Scrap Deposit Tax" for all motor vehicles was introduced in 1978. When purchasing or registering a new vehicle, a standard €190 tax (as per 2010) is paid to the Norwegian Customs and Excise Authorities. This tax is refunded when scrapping the vehicle.

=== Portugal ===
Portugal has increased a scrappage scheme allowing €1,000 for a car being older than ten years and €1,500 for a car being older fifteen years if the car is being recycled and the new car has an emission standard of CO_{2} < 140 g/km. In January 2010, Portuguese Government made a proposal to limit CO_{2} emissions of the new car to 130 g/km. This proposal was voted in the beginning of March.

=== Romania ===
In Romania, a scrappage scheme was introduced in 2000 by Dacia itself after being bought by Renault, and later, in 2005 by most if all car dealers with the help of the government, and it allows customers a 3,800 lei (1 euro = 4.2 lei) discount if the car was older than ten years. There is no emission restriction of the new car to be bought. Since 2010, one person can scrap up to three cars and/or use the same amount of vouchers in exchange for a new one, but in 2012 this was dropped. In 2014, the value of the voucher was raised to 6,500 lei and the age of the car reduced to eight years.

Number of cars traded

Year	2005	2006	2007	2008	2009	2010	2011	2012	2013	2014	2015
Cars traded	14,607	15,110	16,444	30,466	32,327	189,323	116,641	44,856	19,900	20,391	25,000 (Note: Total number of allowed certificates.)

=== Russia ===
A car scrappage scheme was in effect in Russia between 2010 and 2011. This allowed owners of light cars older than ten years (that owned the car for at least one year) to receive a subsidy of 50,000 roubles ($1,751) if they purchased a new car built in Russia.

The scheme was relaunched in 2014, now offering incentives of at least 40,000 roubles (€825) for cars that were at least six years old. A total of 500,000 certificates were issued during its first initial run, and 170,000 when it was relaunched three years later in 2014.

=== Slovakia ===
In Slovakia, a scrappage scheme was introduced that allows for €2,000 (originally €2,500) if the old car was older than ten years of age and the new car was below €25,000 in value.

=== Spain ===
In Spain, there is a scrappage scheme (Plan 2000E) with a special credit scheme for a new car (category M vehicle) to reach a level of less than 120 g/km and trucks (category M vehicle) 160 g/km and if the old vehicle was more than ten years or 250,000 km.

=== United Kingdom ===
The United Kingdom introduced a scrappage incentive scheme in the 2009 budget. Scrapping a car which was at least ten years old (registered on or before 31 July 1999) allowed for a £2,000 cash incentive – the money burden was shared, with £1,000 funded by the UK Government and £1,000 funded by the automotive industry. The Government's investment was initially limited to £300,000,000 allowing for approximately 300,000 customers to benefit. Many dealers and car scrapping businesses taking part in the scheme, offered more than the recommended £1,000, many as high as £2,000 or even £3,000.

The scrappage scheme was intended to provide financial support to the motor industry, after the recession had caused new car sales to drop. It is largely assumed that newer cars include environmental benefits, but Economist Willem Buiter questioned environmental benefits of the program.

On 28 September 2009, it was confirmed that a further investment from the Government was to be introduced extending the scheme further. It would now cover cars registered as late as 29 February 2000.

The scheme closed on 31 March 2010.

Competitively priced cars from traditional "budget" brands sold particularly well in the United Kingdom while the scrappage scheme was in force. These included the Korean models: Hyundai i10 and Kia Picanto.

=== United States ===
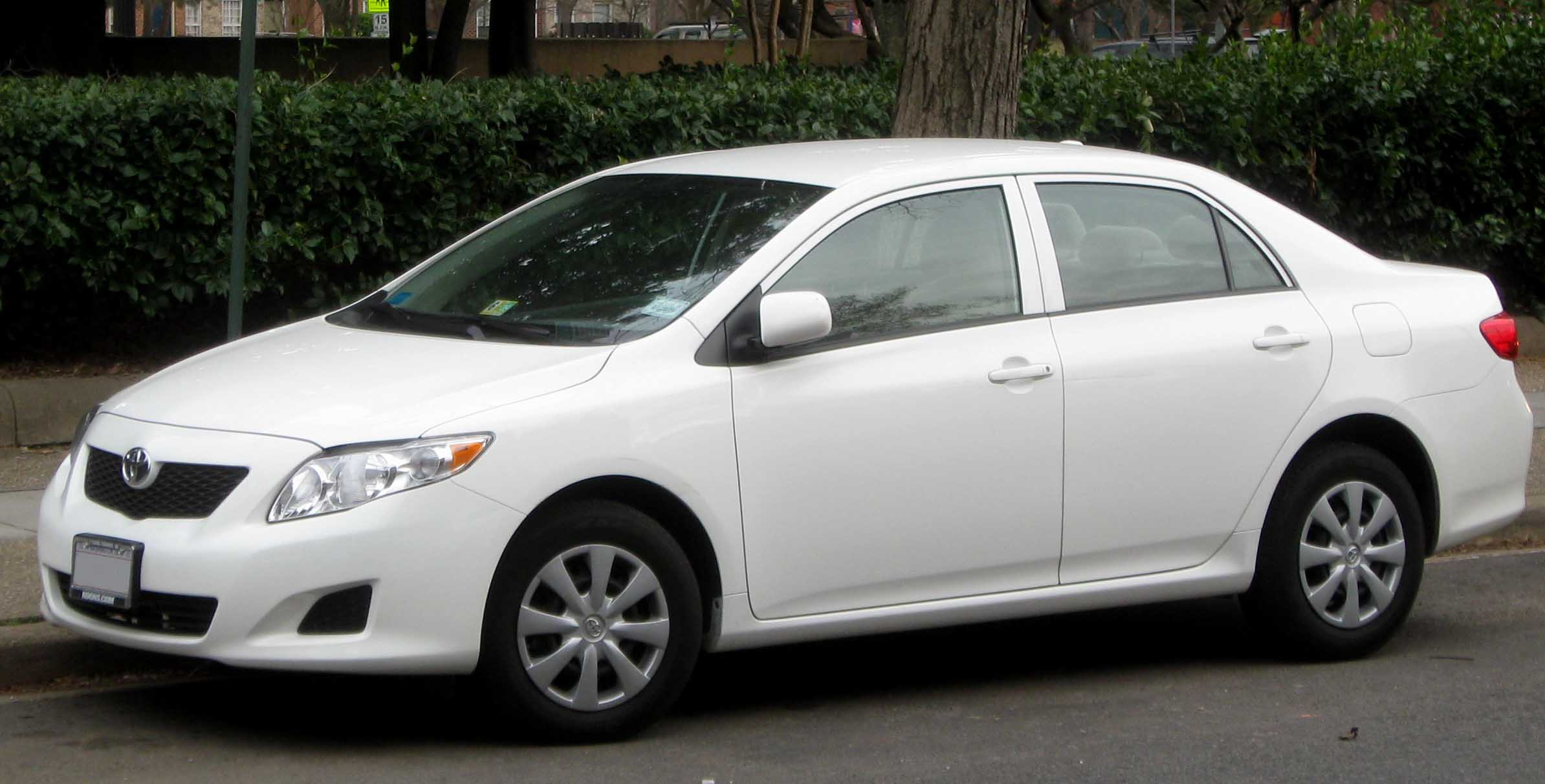
The Toyota Corolla was the CARS program's top seller.

The Car Allowance Rebate System (CARS) was a $3,000,000,000 US federal program that helps US citizens to purchase a new, more fuel efficient vehicle when trading in an older, more polluting vehicle. The program officially started on 1 July 2009 and claims began to be processed until 24 July, and ended on 24 August 2009; as the appropriated resources were exhausted.

The initial $1,000,000,000 for the system was exhausted by 30 July 2009, well before the anticipated end date of 1 November 2009, due to very high demand. In response, Congress approved an additional $2 billion for the program.

On 26 August the DoT reported that the program resulted in 690,114 dealer transactions submitted requesting a total of $2.877 billion in rebates. At the end of the program Toyota accounted for 19.4% of sales, followed by General Motors with 17.6%, Ford with 14.4%, Honda with 13.0%, and Nissan with 8.7%. The Toyota Corolla ranked as the program's top seller and the Ford Explorer 4WD was the most traded-in vehicle.

The Department of Transportation also reported that the average fuel efficiency of trade-ins was 15.8 mpg, compared to 24.9 mpg for the new cars purchased to replace them, translating to a 58% fuel efficiency improvement. However, a study by researchers at the University of Michigan evaluated the effects of the program on the average fuel economy considering a baseline without the existence of the program, since there was already a trend for buying vehicles with higher fuel economy due to the high gasoline prices of 2007 and 2008, and the 2008 financial crisis. The study found that the program improved the average fuel economy of all vehicles purchased by 0.6 mpg in July 2009 and by 0.7 mpg in August 2009

=== Comparison among selected countries ===
Comparison of scrappage programs for selected countries
Country	Maximum incentive	Age requirement	Emissions requirement	Cost to government
United States	$4500 (~€3167)	Under 25 years old	No^{(1)}	$3 billion
Germany	€2500 (~$3552)	Over 9 years old	No	$7.1 billion
United Kingdom	£2000 (~$3336)	Over 10 years old	No	$500 million^{(2)}
France	€1000 (~$1421)	Over 10 years old	Yes^{(3)}	$554 million
Italy	€3500 (~$5024)	Over 10 years old	Yes^{(3)}	–
Source: The Economist. Notes: (1) The U.S. program does not have an emission requirement but instead set a fuel efficiency requirement.(2) The UK incentive is split between government and the dealer. (3) Italy and France required that new cars do not emit more than 160 grams of carbon dioxide per km.

== Reception ==
OECD suggests to measure the "net societal costs" of a scrappage program as a difference between value of destroyed assets, fuel savings, emissions avoided, casualties avoided. Support for the automobile industry is considered a possible intended effect but is not considered in this calculation.

Economic forecaster and former Republican Senate candidate Peter Schiff argued that it is economically inefficient to destroy cars in an attempt to stimulate the economy, likening it to the broken window fallacy.

The Economist argued that the program is the kind of policy required to avoid the liquidity trap in times of economic depression. The article states that:

... the boost in demand that the rebates have brought about is exactly the sort of stimulus that is urgently needed to escape what John Maynard Keynes called a "liquidity trap". According to his theory, consumers may become so worried about the economy that they cling to as much liquid wealth as possible, cutting their spending sharply and thereby triggering precisely the slump they feared. Moreover, as stimulus policies go, cash-for-clunkers looks to be unusually effective. Admittedly, that is not an especially demanding measure, given that Keynes favoured, if need be, burying money in bottles for people to dig up and spend. Cash-for-clunkers has many benefits beyond simply getting more money passing through the hands of consumers and into aggregate demand.

== See also ==
- Car longevity
- Electric vehicle conversion
- European emission standards
- 2008 European Union stimulus plan
- Gas-guzzler
- Parable of the broken window
