= Transport Canada =

Canadian government department

- Transports Canada

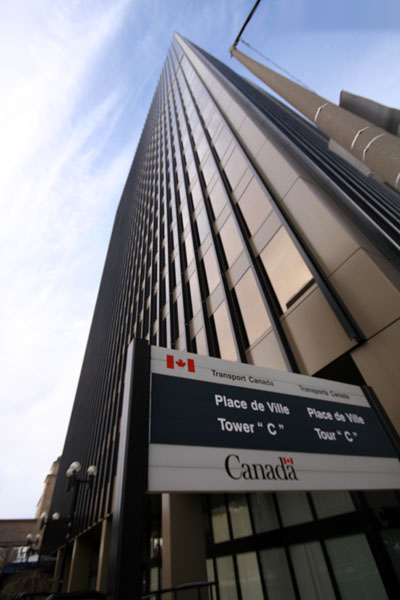
- Place de Ville Tower "C", the headquarters of Transport Canada

Department overview
- Formed: 1935 (as Department of Transport)
- Type: Government department responsible for Transportation
- Jurisdiction: Canada
- Headquarters: 330 Sparks Street, Ottawa, ON K1A 0N5, Canada; 45°25′9.8″N 75°42′17.84″W
- Minister responsible: Steven MacKinnon, Minister of Transport
- Deputy Ministers responsible: Michael Vandergrift, Deputy Minister; Brigitte Diogo, Associate Deputy Minister
- Website: www.tc.canada.ca

Transport Canada (TC; French: Transports Canada) (Note: Transport Canada is the applied title under the Federal Identity Program; the legal title is Department of Transport.) is the department of the Government of Canada responsible for developing regulations, policies and services for road, rail, marine and air transportation in Canada. The current minister of transport is Steven MacKinnon. Transport Canada is headquartered in Ottawa, Ontario.

== History ==
The Department of Transport was created in 1935 by the government of William Lyon Mackenzie King in recognition of the changing transportation environment in Canada at the time. It merged three departments: the former Department of Railways and Canals, the Department of Marine, and the Civil Aviation Branch of the Department of National Defence (c. 1927 when it replaced the Air Board) under C. D. Howe, who would use the portfolio to rationalize the governance and provision of all forms of transportation (air, water and land). He created a National Harbours Board and Trans-Canada Air Lines. The Department of Transport Act came into force November 2, 1936.

Prior to a 1994 federal government reorganization, Transport Canada had a wide range of operational responsibilities including the Canadian Coast Guard, the Saint Lawrence Seaway, airports and seaports, as well as Via Rail and CN Rail. Significant cuts to Transport Canada at that time resulted in CN Rail being privatized, the coast guard being transferred to Fisheries and Oceans, and the seaway and various ports and airports being transferred to local operating authorities. Transport Canada emerged from this process as a department focused on policy and regulation rather than transportation operations.

In 2004, Transport Canada introduced non-passenger screening to enhance both airport and civil aviation security.

In November 18, 2025, TC surrendered almost all of its aviation wing to the Department of National Defence.

== Headquarters ==
Transport Canada's headquarters are located in Ottawa at Place de Ville, Tower C. Transport Canada also has regional headquarters in:

- Vancouver – Government of Canada Building, 820-800 Burrard Street
- Edmonton – Canada Place, 9700 Jasper Avenue NW
- Winnipeg – Macdonald Building, 344 Edmonton Street
- Toronto – Government of Canada Building, 4900 Yonge Street
- Montreal – Pierre Elliott Trudeau Airport, 700 Place Leigh-Capreol
- Moncton – Heritage Building, 95 Foundry Street

== Structure ==
- Minister of Transport
  - Deputy Minister, Transport Canada
    - Associate Deputy Minister
  - Assistant Deputy Minister, Safety and Security
    - Associate Assistant Deputy Minister, Safety and Security
  - Assistant Deputy Minister, Programs
  - Assistant Deputy Minister, Policy
    - Associate Assistant Deputy Minister, Policy
  - Chief Financial Officer and Assistant Deputy Minister, Finance and Management Services
  - Assistant Deputy Minister and Chief Service and Digital Officer
  - Director General, Communications
  - Chief Audit and Evaluation Executive
  - Departmental General Counsel
  - Director General & Chief Economist
  - Regional Director General, Atlantic Region
  - Regional Director General, Quebec Region
  - Regional Director General, Ontario Region
  - Regional Director General, Prairie and Northern Region
  - Assistant Deputy Minister, Supply Chain Office
  - Assistant Deputy Minister, High Frequency Rail
  - Director General, Human Resources

== Enforcement ==

Transport Canada is responsible for enforcing several Canadian legislation, including the Aeronautics Act, Transportation of Dangerous Goods Act, 1992, Motor Vehicle Safety Act, Canada Transportation Act, Railway Safety Act, Canada Shipping Act, 2001, Marine Transportation Security Act amongst others. Each inspector with delegated power from the Minister of Transport receives official credentials to exercise their power, as shown on the right. These inspectors are public officers identified within the Criminal Code of Canada.

== Road ==
The Motor Vehicle Safety Act was established in 1971 in order to create safety standards for cars in Canada. The department also acts as the federal government's funding partner with provincial (and territorial) transport ministries on jointly-funded provincial transportation infrastructure projects for new highways.

TC also manage a database of traffic collisions in Canada.

View source data.
View source data.

== Rail ==
Transport Canada's role in railways include:

- railway safety
- surface and intermodal security
- strategies for rail travel accessibility
- safety of federally regulated railway bridges
- safety and security of international bridges and tunnels (US/CAN border)
- Inspecting and testing traffic control signals, grade crossing warning systems
- rail operating rules
- regulations, standards and services for safe transport of dangerous goods
- Canadian Transport Emergency Centre to assist emergency response and handling dangerous goods emergencies

Following allegations by shippers of service level deterioration, on April 7, 2008, the federal government of Canada launched a review of railway freight service within the country. Transport Canada, which is managing the review, plans to investigate the relationships between Canadian shippers and the rail industry, especially with regards to the two largest railroad companies in the country, Canadian Pacific Railway and Canadian National Railway. On June 26, 2013, the Fair Rail Freight Service Act became law which was a response to the Rail Freight Service Review's Final Report.

== Marine ==
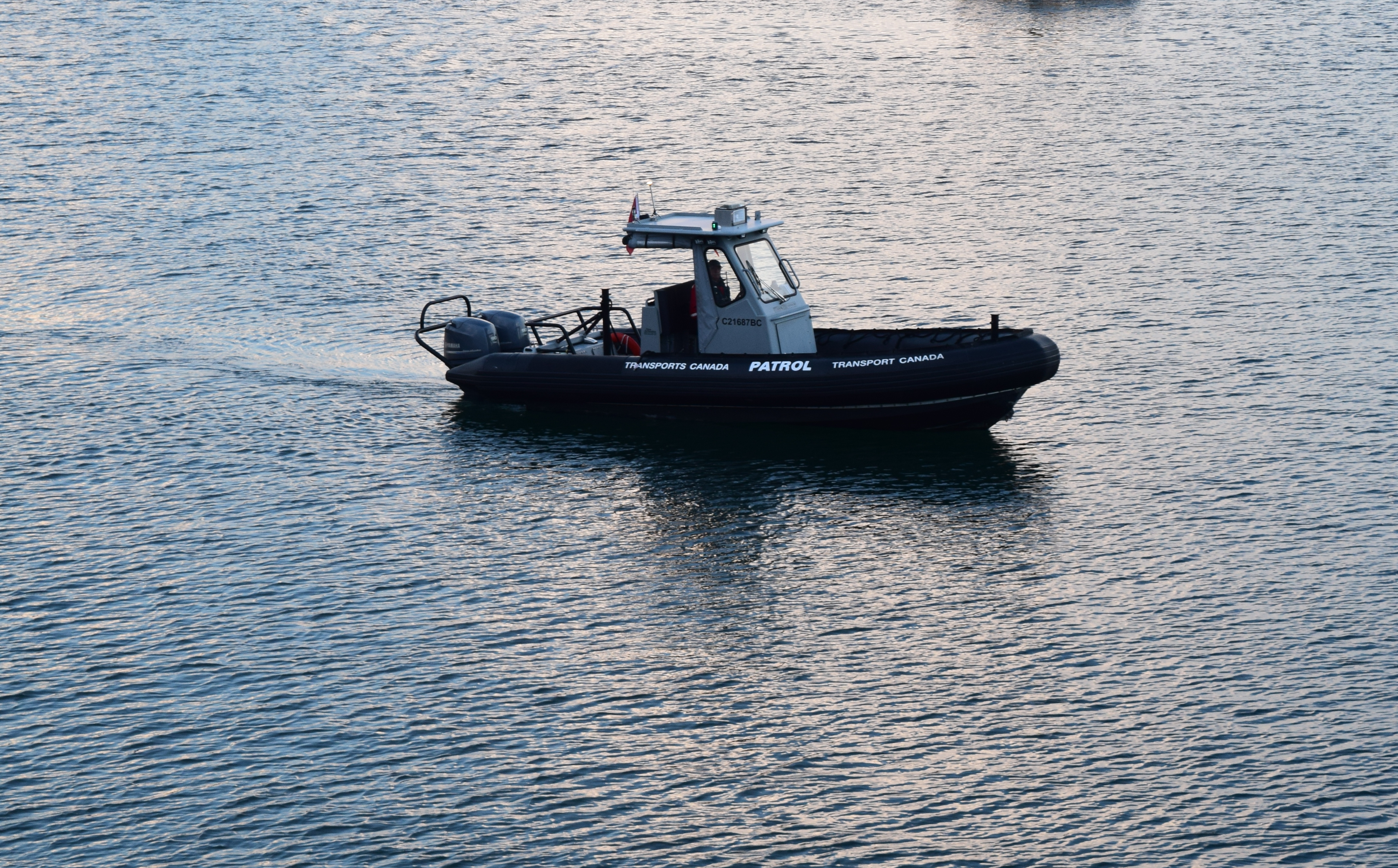
Transport Canada Boat in Victoria harbour

Transport Canada is responsible for the waterways inside and surrounding Canada. These responsibilities include:

- responding and investigating marine accidents within Canadian waters
- enforcing marine acts and regulations such as the Canada Marine Act
- establishing and enforcing marine personnel standards and pilotage
- Marine Safety
- Marine Security
- regulating the operation of marine vessels in Canadian waters

As of 2003 the Office of Boating Safety and the Navigable Waters Protection Program were transferred back to Transport Canada. As was certain regulatory aspects of Emergency Response (Oil pollution)

Transport Canada Marine Safety (TCMS) is the division under Transport Canada that maintains and enhances marine safety and work to protect life, health, property and the marine environment. This includes providing services that are mandated by acts and regulations such as certification for Canadian seafarers and related professionals.

== Aviation ==
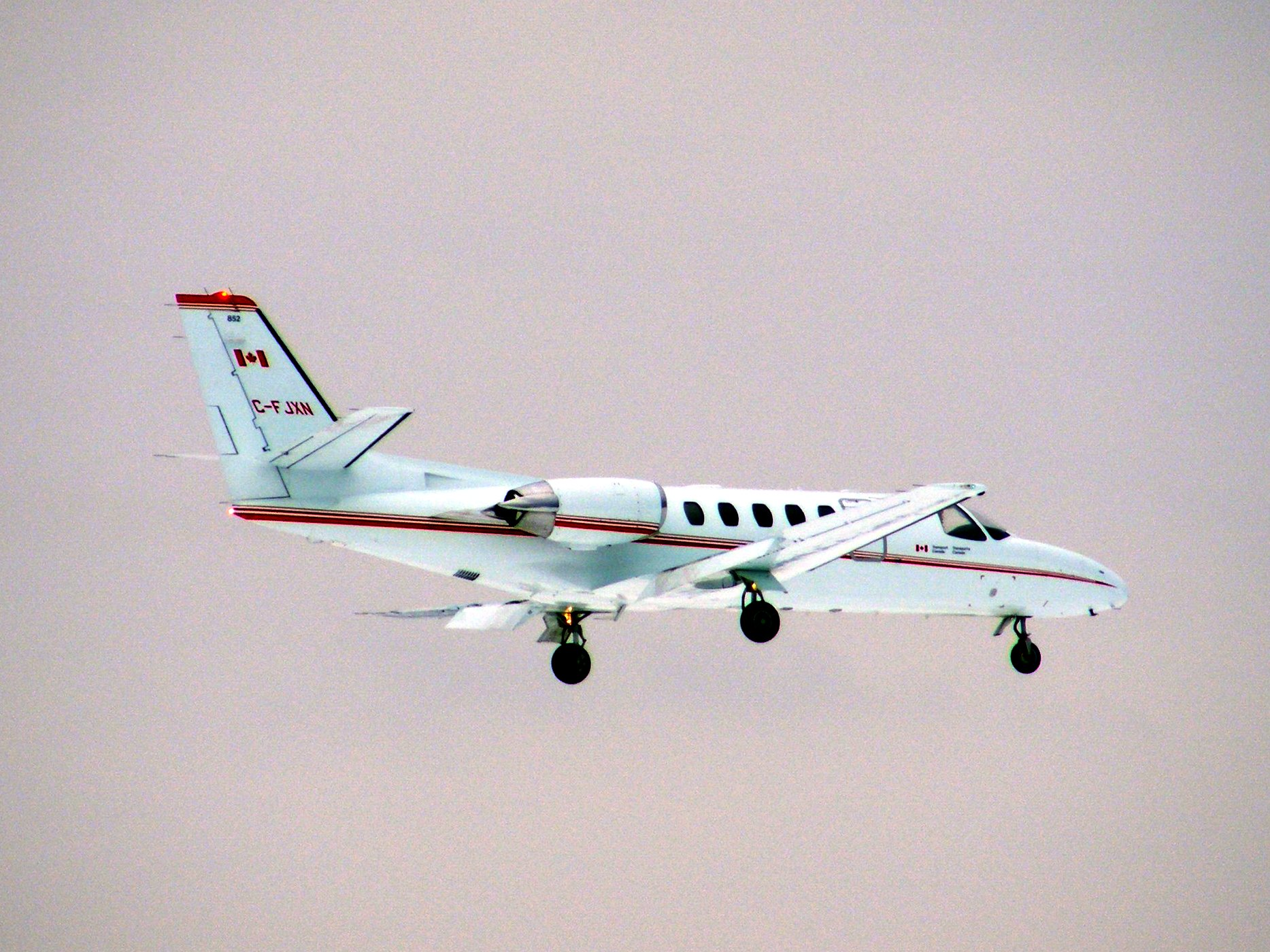
A TC Cessna 550 Citation II

Transport Canada's role in aviation is the most detailed. Until 1996, Transport Canada was responsible for both regulation of aviation and the operation of air traffic services, as well as the operation of most major airports. On November 1, 1996, these responsibilities were split: Transport Canada remains responsible for regulation (through the Canadian Aviation Regulations (CARs) and Standards), and a new regulated non-profit company, NAV CANADA, took over responsibility for all civilian air traffic services. This change was (and remains) controversial within the private aviation sector because NAV CANADA began charging for services that were previously funded through a specific tax on aviation gasoline. The specific tax remains but separate charges are levied by NAV CANADA. In 2005, the United States was discussing a similar delegation of the FAA's air traffic services to an "arm's-length" government corporation.

During the 1990s, Transport Canada also began privatizing the operation of large airports, and divesting itself of small airports altogether (typically handing them over to municipalities). Following the 1994 National Airports Policy, Transport Canada retains ownership of most airports with 200,000 or more annual passenger movements, as well as the primary airports serving the federal, provincial, and territorial capitals, but leases most of these airports (which make up the National Airports System) to outside operators; currently, there are 26 airports in the system, of which 22 are operated by 21 Airport Authorities, an example of which is the Greater Toronto Airports Authority.

In 2003, Transport Canada launched its Electronic Collection of Air Transportation Statistics program to collect passenger and cargo data in real-time from air carriers flying in Canada. ECATS will expand into the field of general aviation during 2008. Transport Canada also collects data on all accidents and incidents, no matter how minor, using the Civil Aviation Daily Occurrence Reporting System (CADORS).

Transport Canada continues to be responsible for licensing pilots and other aviation specialists (such as dispatchers and mechanics) as well as registering and inspecting aircraft. It is also responsible for the safety certification and continuous safety oversight of most forms of commercial operations. These responsibilities are carried out by 6 regions, Atlantic, Quebec, Ontario, Prairie & Northern, Pacific and the sixth region based in Ottawa (National Capital Region) is responsible for air operators operating international flights and certain types of large airplanes. The Canadian Aviation Regulations (CARs) are also under Transport Canada control.

The Canadian Air Transport Security Authority is a Crown corporation that reports to parliament through the Minister of Transport. It is responsible for the protection of specific elements of the air transportation system – from passenger and baggage screening to screening airport workers. In spring 2017 CATSA and the Canada Border Services Agency began their roll-out "as part of a broader effort to modernize and streamline clearance procedures at Canadian airports" of the self-service border clearance kiosks programme, under which Canadian travellers are subject to facial recognition technology upon re-entry to the country. It was expected that as a cost-cutting measure the programme was to reduce the number of civilian interactions with civil servants.

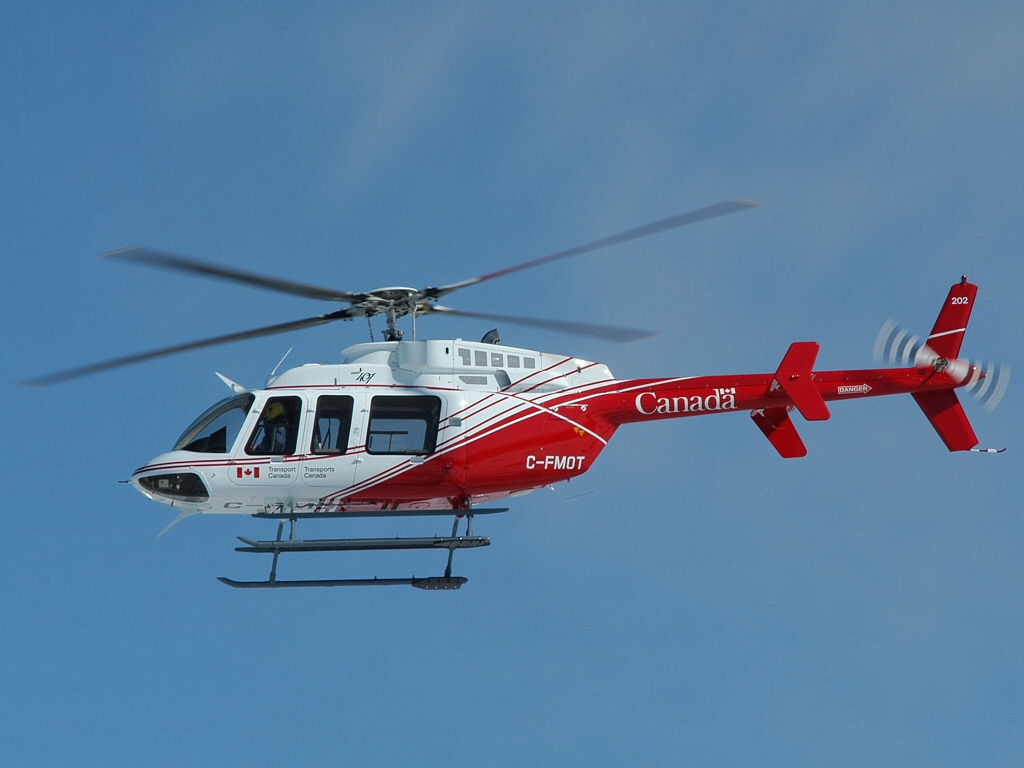
Transport Canada Bell 407 Helicopter C-FMOT

=== Civil Aviation Authority ===
Transport Canada's Civil Aviation (TCCA) Directorate is Canada's civil aviation authority. It has existed since 1936, when civil aviation was transferred from the Civil Aviation Branch of the Department of National Defence.

Based in Ottawa, the Directorate has regional offices across Canada in geographical regions:

- Pacific – British Columbia
- Prairie and Northern – Alberta, Saskatchewan, Manitoba, Northwest Territories, Yukon
- Ontario
- Quebec
- Atlantic Region – Nova Scotia, PEI, Newfoundland and Labrador, New Brunswick

=== Air accident investigation ===
Prior to 1990, Transport Canada was responsible for aircraft incident investigation through:

- Aircraft Accident Investigation Branch (1960–1984)
- Canadian Aviation Safety Board (1984–1990)

After 1990, the role was transferred over to Transportation Safety Board of Canada.

=== Aircraft fleet ===
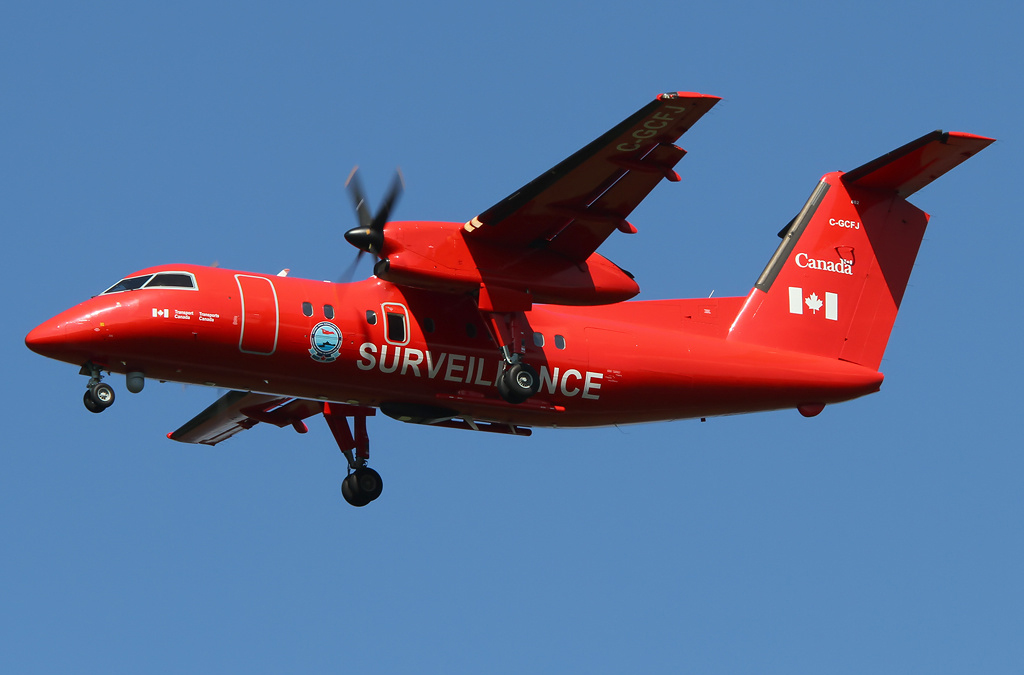
De Havilland Canada DHC-8M-102 Dash 8, C-GCFJ

As of 11 April 2026, Transport Canada lists the following aircraft in its database and operate as ICAO airline designator TGO, and telephony TRANSPORT.

Transport Canada fleet
Aircraft	No. of aircraft	Variants	Notes
Beechcraft King Air	3	C90A	Fixed-wing aircraft
Bell 412	7	412EP	Helicopter
Bell 429	17		Helicopter
De Havilland Canada Dash 7	1	DHC-7-150IR	Fixed-wing aircraft
De Havilland Canada Dash 8	3	2 - DHC-8M-102; 1 - DHC-8M-103	Fixed-wing aircraft
Total	31		

== Recent controversies ==
Transport Canada has been the centre of a number of controversies in recent years. In September 2009, the CBC's Fifth Estate produced a report "Riding on Risk", which detailed alleged mismanagement and cover-ups in Transport Canada. The story was sparked by a lost memory stick which was found by a journalism student. The memory stick contained many documents showing efforts by security inspectors to enforce aviation security regulations, and the perceived failure of management to do so. The CBC report also detailed the alleged reprisals — and fear of reprisals — against whistleblowers and other employees.

Transport Canada's move to Safety Management Systems (SMS) in its regulation of civil aviation has been criticised. Whistleblower Hugh Danford, a former inspector at Transport Canada, went on record criticizing this approach, indicating that it would increase risk to the flying public. Critics have warned that introducing SMS to the aviation sector is "a recipe for disaster". However, the aviation accident rate in Canada declined over a number of years to 2008.

The rail industry in Canada, which has had SMS since 2001 and is also regulated by Transport Canada, had shown a marked increase in accidents under this regulatory scheme to 2006.

Several Transport Canada senior executives, including Assistant Deputy Minister, Safety and Security, Marc Grégoire, were sued in 2008 for reprisals against another whistleblower, Ian Bron. who reported that the Marine Security framework was riddled with gaps.

On 23 December 2013, it was revealed that a Transport Canada inspector had been dismissed for falsifying departmental reports. The identity of the guilty party was not revealed, because of a concern for his or her privacy.

The Canadian Association of Journalists nominated Transport Canada for its Secrecy Award for a second time in 2008, indicating that a bill to amend the Aeronautics Act will cause "a veil of secrecy [to] fall over all information reported by airlines about performance, safety violations, aviation safety problems and their resolution."

In September 2009, Transport Canada was alleged to have fraudulently charged expenses to the non-existent Mackenzie Valley Pipeline project. This story came to light after repeated efforts by access to information expert Ken Rubin, and repeated denials by the department that the incriminating documents existed or that any impropriety had occurred.

Transport Canada was criticized in 2008 for its refusal to approve electric cars manufactured in Canada.

In 2017, Transport Canada proposed regulations for drones that were widely criticized.

As a result of the Ethiopian Airlines Flight 302 crash and the Lion Air Flight 610 crash, which occurred five months prior to the Ethiopian crash, most airlines and countries began grounding the Boeing 737 MAX 8 (and in many cases all MAX variants) due to safety concerns, but Transport Canada declined to temporarily ground Boeing 737 Max 8 operating in Canada. However, on 13 March, Transport Canada reversed the decision and grounded all 737 MAX 8 and MAX 9 aircraft.

In May 2026, W5 on CTV Television Network reported on cases of individuals being arrested abroad for unknowingly smuggling drugs. Baggage workers were switching bag tags from people's personal bags to bags carrying drugs.Investigative journalists found out that corrupt employees handling the checked bags were involved and there were security gaps.

== See also ==
- ecoAuto – Canadian government incentive program to purchase fuel-efficient vehicles.
- Pleasure Craft Operator Card – Mandatory Boater Education in Canada
- Canadian Air Carrier Protection Program
- Transportation Safety Board of Canada
- Canadian Transportation Agency
- Air Board (Canada)

The provinces and territories also have their own transportation departments, namely to deal with roads and vehicle licensing and regulations:

- British Columbia Ministry of Transportation
- Ministry of Highways and Infrastructure (Saskatchewan)
- Minister of Infrastructure and Transportation (Manitoba)
- Ministry of Transportation of Ontario
- Transports Québec
- Department of Transportation (New Brunswick)
- Nova Scotia Department of Transportation and Infrastructure Renewal
