= Retire Your Ride =

The Retire Your Ride (French: Adieu Bazou) program was a voluntary Canadian scrappage program created to reward Canadians for permanently retiring a vehicle made in 1995 or earlier for a wide range of rewards, such as a public transit pass or C$300. The program ended on March 31, 2011. By January 2011, the program had surpassed its original targets and had permanently retired over 120,000 vehicles and reduced thousands of tonnes of smog-forming emissions. The program was available in provinces across Canada. Some automakers had started their own complimentary auto retirement programs with rewards on top of the federal program's rewards in an effort to increase vehicle sales in Canada.

== Overview ==
On June 4, 2008 the Government of Canada announced the "National Vehicle Scrappage Program", which would create incentives for residents of Canada to trade in their old, higher-polluting vehicles to promote cleaner alternatives resulting in cleaner air and a healthier environment.

The program started in February 2009 with a new name, "Retire Your Ride". It was initiated by the Government of Canada, the Clean Air Foundation, and its partners with the goal to get people's high-polluting vehicles off the road, rewarding the people for doing so. The vehicles that are traded are recycled in an environment-friendly way. The program aims to retire at least 50,000 vehicles per year until March 31, 2011.

Vehicles that were made in 1995 and older that are in running condition and have been registered and properly insured for the last six months are eligible for the program. Rewards for bringing those vehicles in include a public transit pass or a membership to a car-sharing program, $300 cash, or discounts on commuter bicycles. Some automotive companies (In January 2011: GM, Ford, Hyundai and Chrysler) offer an additional rebate off the purchase of a new vehicle. Some provinces offer different rewards, such as a charitable tax receipt. The program aims for vehicles built before 1995 because they produce roughly 19 times more air pollutants than newer cars and trucks. The program is set to run for four years, with $92 million set aside for the program.

== Success ==
During the program's launched January to mid-August 2009, the program scrapped about 12,000 vehicles, much less than the program was hoping to achieve during those months. Ford of Canada CEO Dave Mondragon said the Canadian program was "not having [that much] of an impact" and the Canadian Automotive Dealers Association suggested in April that an incentive of $3,000 would work much better. Environment Minister Jim Prentice stated that he is looking to see if offering Canadian consumers more generous incentives will result in more participants. On September 3, 2009, Prentice said that $62 million remains of the $92 million set aside for the program.

As the program developed and more reward partners joined, the number of participants increased. As of October 13, 2010, Retire Your Ride had retired over 101,000 vehicles, achieving the second year's goal six months early. Retire Your Ride ended March 31, 2011.

350 auto recyclers have been trained and audited in a National Code of Practice that prescribes environmental best practices for the auto recycling industry - including the removal of hazardous materials (mercury switches, batteries, etc.), dismantling of the engine, reselling of parts (not related to the engine) and how to contain environmental spills. This has expanded the capacity of the auto recycling industry's environmental practices. The Code continues on with auto recyclers as the Canadian Auto Recyclers Environmental Code (CAREC).

=== Increase cash incentive ===
Dealers and manufacturers have asked the Canadian government give consumers $3,500 towards the purchase of a new car if they bring in their old vehicle, though the government stated in June 2009 that there are no plans to expand the program. Such an increase would require the government to spend $350 million on the program. If the government does increase the cash incentive, then the government could roll in the $92 million set aside for the program and would receive millions in GST on the sales of new vehicles.

Richard Gauthier, president of the Canadian Automobile Dealers Association, stated in June 2009 that "the 3,500 new car dealers who are at the heart of nearly every community across Canada are struggling to survive this unprecedented economic downturn" and that increasing the cash incentive "could increase sales by as much as 100,000 units". However, on September 3, 2009, Jim Prentice announced that the federal government does not have any plans on increasing the incentives. Prentice also said the scrappage program was not intended to boost the struggling automotive industry during the current recession, but instead it was meant to get old, polluting vehicles off the road and help reduce vehicle emissions.

== Automaker response ==
Some automakers say that the federal government is not doing enough with the scrappage program and contrasted it with the American Car Allowance Rebate System, where people who bring in a vehicle less than 25 years old may receive US$3,500 to US$4,500 towards a new vehicle. For example, the Canadian Vehicle Manufacturers' Association, which represents General Motors, Ford, and Chrysler, says a stronger scrappage program would have provided a better boost to the economy while taking polluting vehicles off the road. As a result, some automakers have created their own programs on top of the federal scrappage program that increase cash incentives in hopes of increasing vehicle sales.

On August 20, 2009 Hyundai Canada started their own program complementing Retire Your Ride. In addition to the $300 already being offered by the government, Hyundai's program offers people an extra $500 to $1,000 on a new Hyundai if they bring in a vehicle to a Hyundai dealership that was made in 1995 or older. On that day Hyundai Canada president Steve Kelleher recommended the federal government increase its incentives if it has the money, though Kelleher stressed that Hyundai Canada's program is not meant to force the government to increase cash incentives.

On August 21, 2009 Chrysler Canada started a program similar to Hyundai's program. In addition to the $300 being offered by the government, people who bring a vehicle made in 1995 or older that is in running condition and has been registered and insured in Canada for the previous consecutive six or 12 months to a Chrysler dealership, then they could receive an extra $500 to $1,500 towards a new Chrysler vehicle.

On September 3, 2009 Ford started its own program. In addition to the $300 being offered by the government, people who bring a vehicle made in 1995 or older that has been properly registered and insured for the last six months (12 months in British Columbia) to a Ford dealership could receive an extra $1,000 towards a new Ford or Lincoln car or compact truck, $2,000 towards a new Ford sport-utility-vehicle, or $3,000 towards a new Ford truck or Lincoln vehicle.

On September 16, 2009 GM started its own scrappage program. In addition to the $300 being offered by the government, people may receive, depending on the purchase price, $500, $1,000, $2,000, or $3,000 towards 2009 or 2010 model GM if they bring a vehicle made in 1995 or older that is in running condition, registered, and properly insured for the last six months (12 months in British Columbia) to a GM dealership.

Retire Your Ride continues today, operated on a voluntary basis by the Automotive Recyclers of Canada (ARC), one of the original programs key stakeholders. The Program pays cash/cheque for older vehicles that are bid on by auto recyclers accredited to the CAREC standard.
