= 2009 United Kingdom budget =

2009 United Kingdom Budget
- Presented: 22 April 2009
- Country: United Kingdom
- Parliament: 54th
- Party: Labour
- Chancellor: Alistair Darling
- Total revenue: £496 billion^{‡} (29% of 2008 GDP)
- Total expenditures: £671 billion (40% of 2008 GDP)
- Deficit: £175 billion (10.5% of 2008 GDP)
- Website: Budget 2009: Building Britain's Future
- ^{‡}Numbers in italics are projections.

Pie chart of UK central government expenditure, 2009-10.

The 2009 United Kingdom Budget, officially known as Budget 2009: Building Britain's Future, was formally delivered by Alistair Darling in the House of Commons on 22 April 2009. It introduced new tax, spending and debt rises in a financial environment of rising unemployment and recession.

== Details ==
To stimulate the motor industry, a £2,000 scrappage allowance was announced for a car more than 10 years old, if it is traded in for a new car and if it has been in the car buyer's ownership for the previous 12 months. £1,000 of this was to be provided by the government, and £1,000 by a motor manufacturer. The scheme started about mid-May 2009 and was planned to finish at the end of February 2010; however, before it was due to end, it was extended by one month, to the end of March 2010.

For high earners, a 50% tax band was announced for earners of over £150,000 per year to start in April 2010, and tax relief on pension contributions was reduced progressively from 40% to 20% for annual incomes between £150,000 and £180,000 and to 20% above £180,000 commencing April 2011.

Starting in April 2010, those with annual incomes over £100,000 would see their Personal allowance reduced by £1 for every £2 earned over £100,000, until the Personal allowance was reduced to zero, which (in 2010) would occur at an income of £112,950. This had the effect of creating an anomalous effective 60% marginal tax rate in the income band between £100,000 and £112,950, with the marginal tax rate returning to 40% above £112,950. As the Personal allowance has grown over the years, this has resulted in a corresponding increase in the size of the anomalous effective 60% tax band. As of 2018, the effective 60% marginal tax rate now arises for incomes between £100,000 and £123,700.

For savers, limits in Individual Savings Account (ISA) accounts were increased in two phases to a total of £10,200, including an additional £1,500 to the previous upper limit of £3,600 in a cash ISA. The first phase is for those over age 50 years, who can contribute additional amounts from 6 October 2009.

=== Taxes ===
| Receipts | 2009-10 Revenues (£bn) |
|---|---|
| Income Tax | 141 |
| Value Added Tax (VAT) | 64 |
| National Insurance | 98 |
| Excise duties | 44 |
| Corporate Tax | 35 |
| Council Tax | 25 |
| Business rates | 24 |
| Other | 67 |
| Total Government revenue | 496 |

=== Spending ===
| Department | 2009-10 Expenditure (£bn) |
|---|---|
| Social protection | 189 |
| Health | 119 |
| Education | 88 |
| Debt interest | 28 |
| Defence | 38 |
| Public order and safety | 35 |
| Personal social services | 31 |
| Housing and Environment | 29 |
| Transport | 23 |
| Industry, agriculture and employment | 20 |
| Other | 72 |
| Total Government spending | 671 |

== See also ==
- Budget of the United Kingdom
