= HOME STAR =

American government stimulus plan

HOME STAR (or HOMESTAR), informally known as Cash for Caulkers, was a United States government program proposed in November 2009 to encourage economic growth by offering incentives to homeowners and retailers for improving the energy efficiency of existing homes.

== Background ==
In late 2009 there was a broad perception that the United States economy was beginning to recover from the Late-2000s recession. There was a broad perception that government spending authorized by the American Recovery and Reinvestment Act of 2009 had contributed to the recovery, and some desire for the government to do more to encourage job growth and a faster recovery.

In mid-November former president Bill Clinton, and John Doerr of Barack Obama's President's Economic Recovery Advisory Board, proposed different versions of an economic stimulus program by which the government would offer tax incentives to encourage people to improve the energy efficiency of their homes. Doerr, in public speeches, called the proposal "cash for caulkers". Separately U.S. Representative Peter Welch proposed a system of energy rebates to Rahm Emanuel, Obama’s Chief of Staff. Obama, in turn, proposed the idea as part of a larger new stimulus program, at a speech at the Brookings Institution on December 8, 2009.

The stated goals of the proposed program are to reduce pollution, particularly greenhouse gases, by reducing household energy use, to save consumers money in the long term through lower power bills, and to stimulate American businesses through the money spent on appliances, materials, and installation. Improving the energy efficiency of "fixed infrastructure", which accounts for approximately 40% of all energy use in the United States, is considered the "low hanging fruit" of energy conservation - a step that achieves results relatively inexpensively and does not require any new technologies or changes to production or consumption methods.

The name "Homestar" is a reference to the popular energy star electronic device efficiency rating system, and the nickname "Cash for Caulkers" is a play on the earlier cash for clunkers automobile trade-in incentive.

== Structure ==
As of December 2009, no proposed legislation had been released, and there were few specific details of how the program would be administered, which federal agencies would be involved, or how the tax incentives would be paid (or to whom). The program is expected to involve preliminary energy audits by private contractor energy experts, who then recommend a series of steps for each homeowner to upgrade their home's energy efficiency. As proposed the plan was for the government to pay 50% of the cost of each home improvement project through a rebate, tax credit, or funds paid to manufacturers and retailers, up to a maximum of $12,000 (~$17,003 in 2024) paid for each home. Alternatively, there was speculation that the federal government might give funds to local governments to run their own programs. There was no limitation on eligibility based on tax bracket or income.

Items under consideration for the program included weatherization of home by installing additional insulation, new doors, and windows, and replacing old appliances with more energy-efficient new ones. Expensive items such as washing machines, dishwashers, refrigerators, air conditioners, and heaters, would be covered.

The program was expected to cost approximately $10 billion over the course of one year, paid for out of unspent Troubled Asset Relief Program funds, and would reduce energy consumption of homes that took full advantage of the program by up to 20%. To become effective it would have to be part of a bill passed by the United States Congress.

== See also ==
- Caulking
- Retrofitting
