= Fuel efficiency =

Form of thermal efficiency

Fuel efficiency (or fuel economy) is a form of thermal efficiency, meaning the ratio of effort to result of a process that converts chemical potential energy contained in a carrier (fuel) into kinetic energy or work. Overall fuel efficiency may vary per device, which in turn may vary per application, and this spectrum of variance is often illustrated as a continuous energy profile. Non-transportation applications, such as industry, benefit from increased fuel efficiency, especially fossil fuel power plants or industries dealing with combustion, such as ammonia production during the Haber process.

In the context of transport, fuel economy is the energy efficiency of a particular vehicle, given as a ratio of distance traveled per unit of fuel consumed. It is dependent on several factors including engine efficiency, transmission design, and tire design. In most countries, using the metric system, fuel economy is stated as "fuel consumption" in liters per 100 kilometers (L/100 km) or kilometers per liter (km/L or kmpl). In a number of countries still using other systems, fuel economy is expressed in miles per gallon (mpg), for example in the US and usually also in the UK (imperial gallon); there is sometimes confusion as the imperial gallon is 20% larger than the US gallon so that mpg values are not directly comparable. Traditionally, litres per mil were used in Norway and Sweden, but both have aligned to the EU standard of L/100 km.

Fuel consumption is a more accurate measure of a vehicle's performance because it is a linear relationship while fuel economy leads to distortions in efficiency improvements. Weight-specific efficiency (efficiency per unit weight) may be stated for freight, and passenger-specific efficiency (vehicle efficiency per passenger) for passenger vehicles.

== Vehicle design ==
Fuel efficiency is dependent on many parameters of a vehicle, including its engine parameters, aerodynamic drag, weight, AC usage, fuel and rolling resistance. There have been advances in all areas of vehicle design in recent decades. Fuel efficiency of vehicles can also be improved by careful maintenance and driving habits.

Hybrid vehicles use two or more power sources for propulsion. In many designs, a small combustion engine is combined with electric motors. Kinetic energy which would otherwise be lost to heat during braking is recaptured as electrical power to improve fuel efficiency. The larger batteries in these vehicles power the car's electronics, allowing the engine to shut off and avoid prolonged idling.

== Fleet efficiency ==
Trucks' share of US vehicles produced, has tripled since 1975. Though vehicle fuel efficiency has increased within each category, the overall trend toward less efficient types of vehicles has offset some of the benefits of greater fuel economy and reduction in carbon dioxide emissions. Without the shift towards SUVs, energy use per unit distance could have fallen 30% more than it did from 2010 to 2022.

Fleet efficiency describes the average efficiency of a population of vehicles. Technological advances in efficiency may be offset by a change in buying habits with a propensity to heavier vehicles that are less fuel-efficient.

== Energy efficiency terminology ==
Energy efficiency is similar to fuel efficiency but the input is usually in units of energy such as megajoules (MJ), kilowatt-hours (kW·h), kilocalories (kcal) or British thermal units (BTU). The inverse of "energy efficiency" is "energy intensity", or the amount of input energy required for a unit of output such as MJ/passenger-km (of passenger transport), BTU/ton-mile or kJ/t-km (of freight transport), GJ/t (for production of steel and other materials), BTU/(kW·h) (for electricity generation), or litres/100 km (of vehicle travel). Litres per 100 km is also a measure of "energy intensity" where the input is measured by the amount of fuel and the output is measured by the distance travelled. For example: Fuel economy in automobiles.

Given a heat value of a fuel, it would be trivial to convert from fuel units (such as litres of gasoline) to energy units (such as MJ) and conversely. But there are two problems with comparisons made using energy units:

- There are two different heat values for any hydrogen-containing fuel which can differ by several percent (see below).
- When comparing transportation energy costs, a kilowatt hour of electric energy may require an amount of fuel with heating value of 2 or 3 kilowatt hours to produce it.

== Energy content of fuel ==
The specific energy content of a fuel is the heat energy obtained when a certain quantity is burned (such as a gallon, litre, kilogram). It is sometimes called the heat of combustion. There exists two different values of specific heat energy for the same batch of fuel. One is the high (or gross) heat of combustion and the other is the low (or net) heat of combustion. The high value is obtained when, after the combustion, the water in the exhaust is in liquid form. For the low value, the exhaust has all the water in vapor form (steam). Since water vapor gives up heat energy when it changes from vapor to liquid, the liquid water value is larger since it includes the latent heat of vaporization of water. The difference between the high and low values is significant, about 8 or 9%. This accounts for most of the apparent discrepancy in the heat value of gasoline. In the U.S. (and the table) the high heat values have traditionally been used, but in many other countries, the low heat values are commonly used.

Fuel type	MJ/L	MJ/kg	BTU/imp gal	BTU/US gal	Research octane number (RON)
Regular gasoline/petrol	34.8	~47	150,100	125,000	Min. 91
Premium gasoline/petrol		~46			Min. 95
Autogas (LPG) (60% propane and 40% butane)	25.5–28.7	~51			108–110
Ethanol	23.5	31.1	101,600	84,600	129
Methanol	17.9	19.9	77,600	64,600	123
Gasohol (10% ethanol and 90% gasoline)	33.7	~45	145,200	121,000	93/94
E85 (85% ethanol and 15% gasoline)	25.2	~33	108,878	90,660	100–105
Diesel	38.6	~48	166,600	138,700	N/A (see cetane)
Biodiesel	35.1	39.9	151,600	126,200	N/A (see cetane)
Vegetable oil (using 9.00 kcal/g)	34.3	37.7	147,894	123,143	
Aviation gasoline	33.5	46.8	144,400	120,200	80-145
Jet fuel, naphtha	35.5	46.6	153,100	127,500	N/A to turbine engines
Jet fuel, kerosene	37.6	~47	162,100	135,000	N/A to turbine engines
Liquefied natural gas	25.3	~55	109,000	90,800	
Liquid hydrogen	9.3	~130	40,467	33,696	

Neither the gross heat of combustion nor the net heat of combustion gives the theoretical amount of mechanical energy (work) that can be obtained from the reaction. (This is given by the change in Gibbs free energy, and is around 45.7 MJ/kg for gasoline.) The actual amount of mechanical work obtained from fuel (the inverse of the specific fuel consumption) depends on the engine. A figure of 17.6 MJ/kg is possible with a gasoline engine, and 19.1 MJ/kg for a diesel engine. See Brake-specific fuel consumption for more information.

== Transportation ==
The energy efficiency in transport is the useful travelled distance, of passengers, goods or any type of load; divided by the total energy put into the transport propulsion means. The energy input might be rendered in several different types depending on the type of propulsion, and normally such energy is presented in liquid fuels, electrical energy or food energy. The inverse of the energy efficiency in transport is the energy consumption in transport.

Energy consumption in transport is often described in terms of fuel consumption, fuel consumption being the reciprocal of fuel economy. and linked with a means of propulsion which uses chemical energy, whilst energy efficiency in general is applicable to any sort of propulsion. In order to compare the energy efficiency in any type of vehicle, it helps to use the International System of Units including joules for energy and metres for distance. The more efficient the vehicle, the more metres it covers with one joule (more efficiency), or the fewer joules it uses to travel over one metre (less consumption). The efficient use of energy in transport largely varies by means of transport. Different types of transport consume from some dozen kilojoules per kilometre (kJ/km) for a bicycle to several thousand for a car. Several distinctions are often not clear:

- The energy content of liquid fuels is well known, but not always exactly which fuel is used or whether its value was converted or not.
- The energy content of food varies greatly so that for walking and vehicles using human power its value of metabolic energy is used. If the food for the basal metabolic rate, i.e. the energy needed for living, is included, as it most often is, the efficiency is much lower than if it is excluded, as for the drivers of motor vehicles.
- The energy content of electricity itself is an exact definition, but it undergoes many conversions e.g. from a power station to the vehicle, so that comparisons require defining where the electricity is measured and/or how it is produced.

Via type of fuel used and rate of fuel consumption, energy efficiency is also often related to operating cost ($/km) and environmental emissions (e.g. CO_{2}e/km). The same considerations are beginning to be used also for type of food.

=== Fuel efficiency of motor vehicles ===
New light-duty vehicle fuel economy by vehicle type from vehicle manufacturers in the United States, in miles per gallon (1975 - 2019)

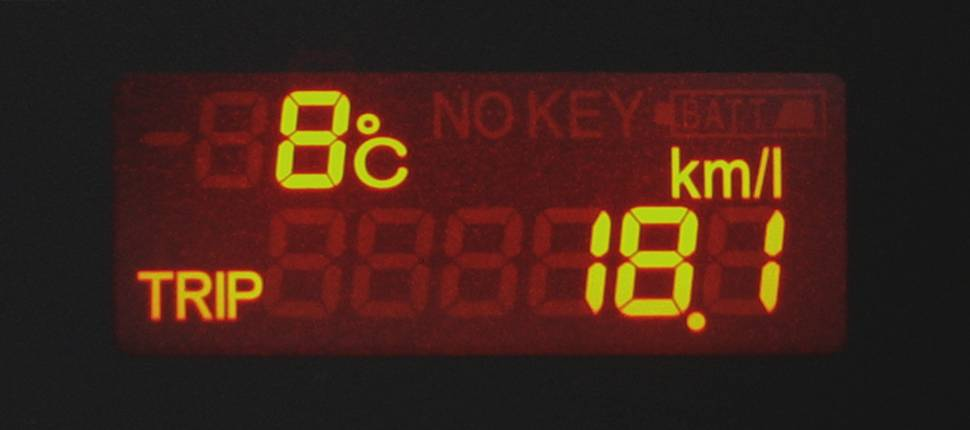
Fuel consumption monitor from a 2006 Honda Airwave. The displayed fuel economy is 18.1 km/L (5.5 L/100 km; 43 mpg_{‑US}).

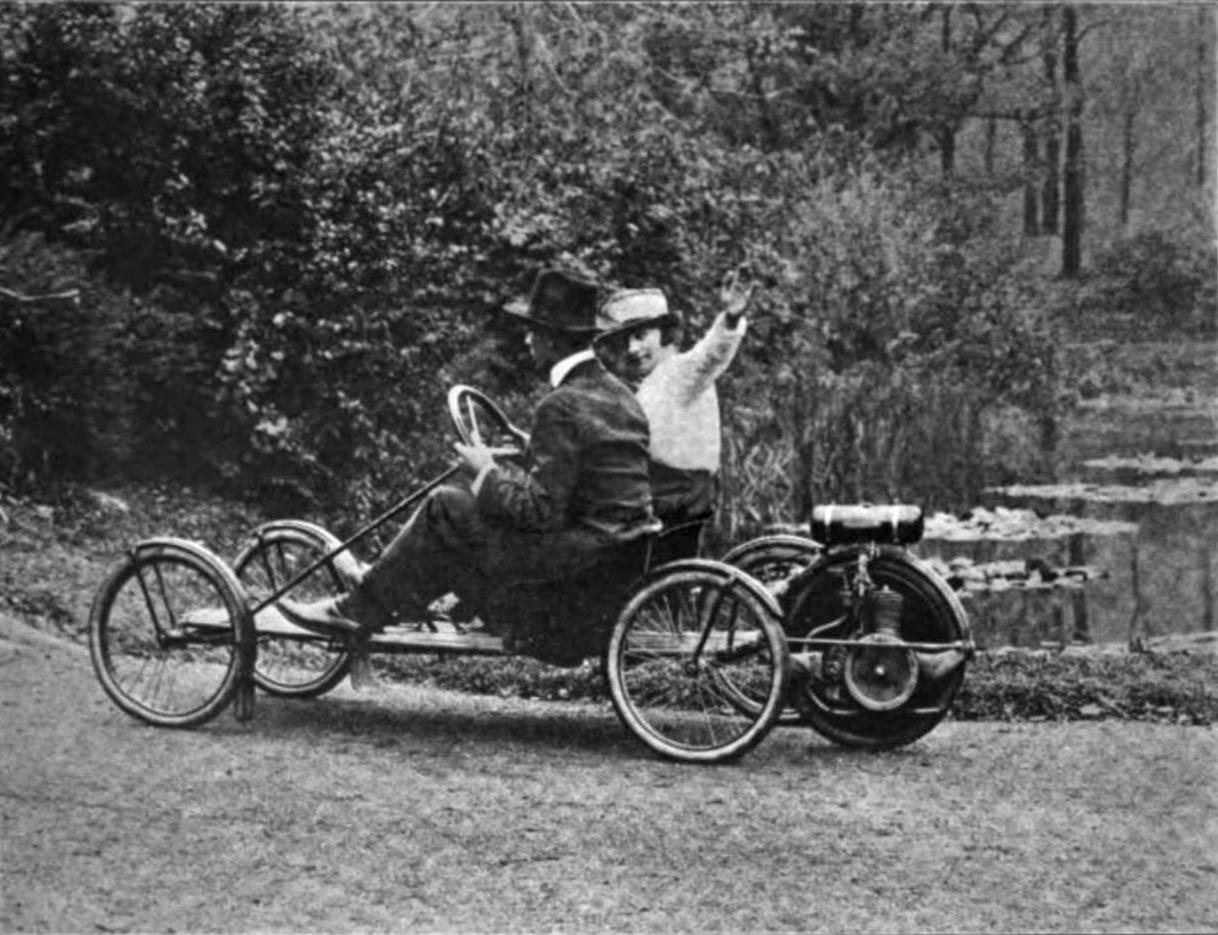
A Briggs and Stratton Flyer from 1916. Originally an experiment in creating a fuel-saving automobile in the United States, the vehicle weighed only 135 lb (61.2 kg) and was an adaptation of a small gasoline engine originally designed to power a bicycle.

The fuel economy or fuel efficiency of an automobile relates to the distance traveled by a vehicle and the amount of fuel consumed. It can be expressed in terms of the volume of fuel to travel a given distance, such as in litres per 100 kilometres (L/100 km), or through its inverse, the distance traveled per unit volume of fuel consumed, as in kilometres per litre (km/L) or miles per gallon (mpg). Since fuel economy of vehicles is a significant factor in air pollution, the importation of motor fuel can be a large part of a nation's foreign trade and consumers frequently undervalue fuel efficiency, many countries impose requirements for fuel economy.

Different methods are used to approximate the actual performance of the vehicle. The energy in fuel is required to overcome various losses (wind resistance, tire drag, and others) encountered while propelling the vehicle, and in providing power to vehicle systems such as ignition or air conditioning. Various strategies can be employed to reduce losses at each of the conversions between the chemical energy in the fuel and the kinetic energy of the vehicle. Driver behavior can affect fuel economy; maneuvers such as sudden acceleration and heavy braking waste energy.

Electric cars use kilowatt-hours of electricity per 100 kilometres (kWh/100km); in the U.S., an equivalence measure, such as miles per gallon gasoline equivalent (US gallon) has been created to attempt to compare them.

=== Driving technique ===
Energy-efficient driving techniques are used by drivers who wish to reduce their fuel consumption, and thus maximize fuel efficiency. Many drivers have the potential to improve their fuel efficiency significantly. Simple things such as keeping tires properly inflated, having a vehicle well-maintained and avoiding idling can dramatically improve fuel efficiency. Careful use of acceleration and deceleration and especially limiting use of high speeds helps efficiency. The use of multiple such techniques is called "hypermiling".

While these techniques can be applied by any driver, energy-efficient driving (often called "eco-driving") has become a major focus of modern fleet management. As a key part of fleet digitalization, companies use telematics to automatically monitor and manage fuel economy. A fleet telematics system collects data on behaviors that waste fuel, such as harsh acceleration, speeding, and idling. This information is then used in driver scoring applications to identify and coach drivers. This is often combined with dedicated fuel-management systems that use high-precision fuel level sensors to get exact fuel consumption data and prevent gasoline theft.

Simple fuel-efficiency techniques can result in reduction in fuel consumption without resorting to radical fuel-saving techniques that can be unlawful and dangerous, such as tailgating larger vehicles.

== Advanced technology ==
The most efficient machines for converting energy to rotary motion are electric motors, as used in electric vehicles. However, electricity is not a primary energy source so the efficiency of the electricity production has also to be taken into account. Railway trains can be powered using electricity, delivered through an additional running rail, overhead catenary system or by on-board generators used in diesel-electric locomotives as common on the US and UK rail networks. Pollution produced from centralised generation of electricity is emitted at a distant power station, rather than "on site". Pollution can be reduced by using more railway electrification and low carbon power for electricity. Some railways, such as the French SNCF and Swiss federal railways derive most, if not 100% of their power, from hydroelectric or nuclear power stations, therefore atmospheric pollution from their rail networks is very low. This was reflected in a study by AEA Technology between a Eurostar train and airline journeys between London and Paris, which showed the trains on average emitting 10 times less CO_{2}, per passenger, than planes, helped in part by French nuclear generation.

=== Hydrogen fuel cells ===
In the future, hydrogen cars may be commercially available. Toyota is test-marketing vehicles powered by hydrogen fuel cells in southern California, where a series of hydrogen fueling stations has been established. Powered either through chemical reactions in a fuel cell that create electricity to drive very efficient electrical motors or by directly burning hydrogen in a combustion engine (near identically to a natural gas vehicle, and similarly compatible with both natural gas and gasoline); these vehicles promise to have near-zero pollution from the tailpipe (exhaust pipe). Potentially the atmospheric pollution could be minimal, provided the hydrogen is made by electrolysis using electricity from non-polluting sources such as solar, wind or hydroelectricity or nuclear. Commercial hydrogen production uses fossil fuels and produces more carbon dioxide than hydrogen.

Because there are pollutants involved in the manufacture and destruction of a car and the production, transmission and storage of electricity and hydrogen, the label "zero pollution" applies only to the car's conversion of stored energy into movement.

In 2004, a consortium of major auto-makers — BMW, General Motors, Honda, Toyota and Volkswagen/Audi — came up with "Top Tier Detergent Gasoline Standard" to gasoline brands in the US and Canada that meet their minimum standards for detergent content and do not contain metallic additives. Top Tier gasoline contains higher levels of detergent additives in order to prevent the build-up of deposits (typically, on fuel injector and intake valve) known to reduce fuel economy and engine performance.

=== In microgravity ===
How fuel combusts affects how much energy is produced. The National Aeronautics and Space Administration (NASA) has investigated fuel consumption in microgravity.

The common distribution of a flame under normal gravity conditions depends on convection, because soot tends to rise to the top of a flame, such as in a candle, making the flame yellow. In microgravity or zero gravity, such as an environment in outer space, convection no longer occurs, and the flame becomes spherical, with a tendency to become more blue and more efficient. There are several possible explanations for this difference, of which the most likely one given is the hypothesis that the temperature is evenly distributed enough that soot is not formed and complete combustion occurs., National Aeronautics and Space Administration, April 2005. Experiments by NASA in microgravity reveal that diffusion flames in microgravity allow more soot to be completely oxidised after they are produced than diffusion flames on Earth, because of a series of mechanisms that behaved differently in microgravity when compared to normal gravity conditions.LSP-1 experiment results, National Aeronautics and Space Administration, April 2005. Premixed flames in microgravity burn at a much slower rate and more efficiently than even a candle on Earth, and last much longer.

== See also ==
- Annual fuel utilization efficiency (AFUE)
- ACEA agreement
- Alternative propulsion
- Camless piston engine
- Carbon dioxide equivalent
- Corporate Average Fuel Economy (CAFE)
- EcoAuto (in Canada)
- Efficient energy use
- Emission standard
- Energy content of Biofuel
- Energy conservation
- Energy conversion efficiency
- Energy density
- FF layout
- Front-wheel drive
- Fuel economy in aircraft
- Fuel economy in automobiles
- Fuel economy maximising behaviors
- Fuel efficiency in transportation
- Gas-guzzler
- Heating value
- Jevons paradox
- Life cycle assessment
- Low-rolling resistance tires
- Miles per gallon gasoline equivalent
- Marine fuel management
- Twinjet
- Variable valve timing
- Unibody
- Automobile costs
- Vehicle metrics
