= Plug-in electric vehicles in Europe =

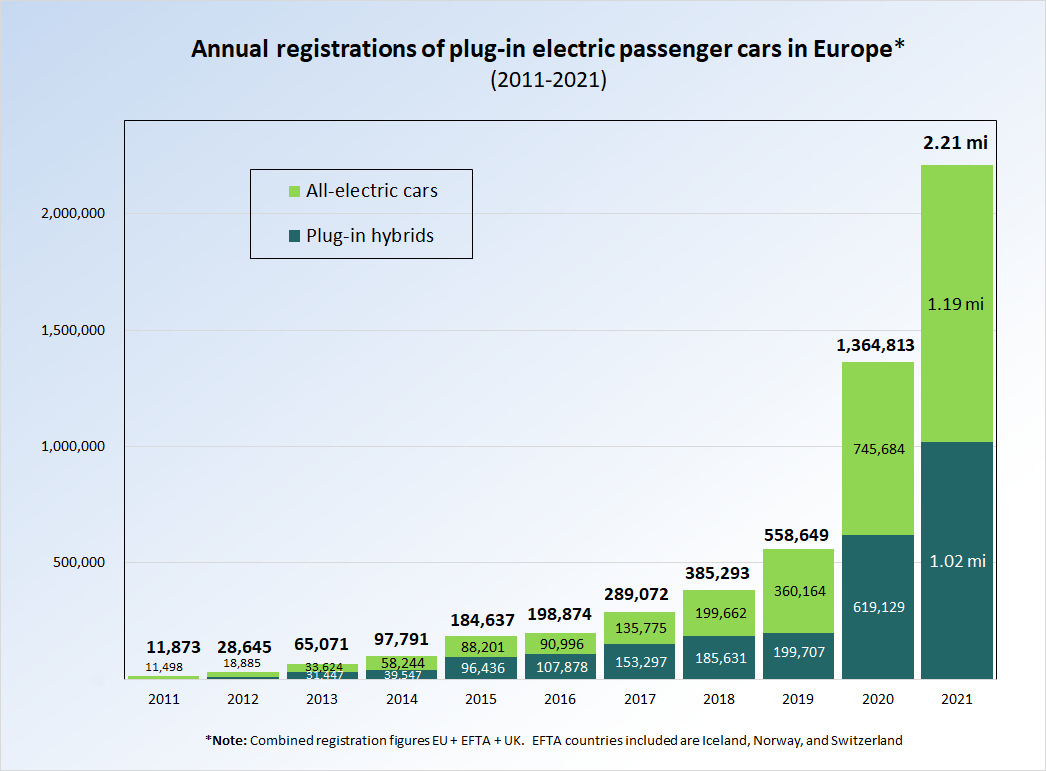
Evolution of annual registrations of plug-in electric passenger cars in Europe between 2011 and 2021

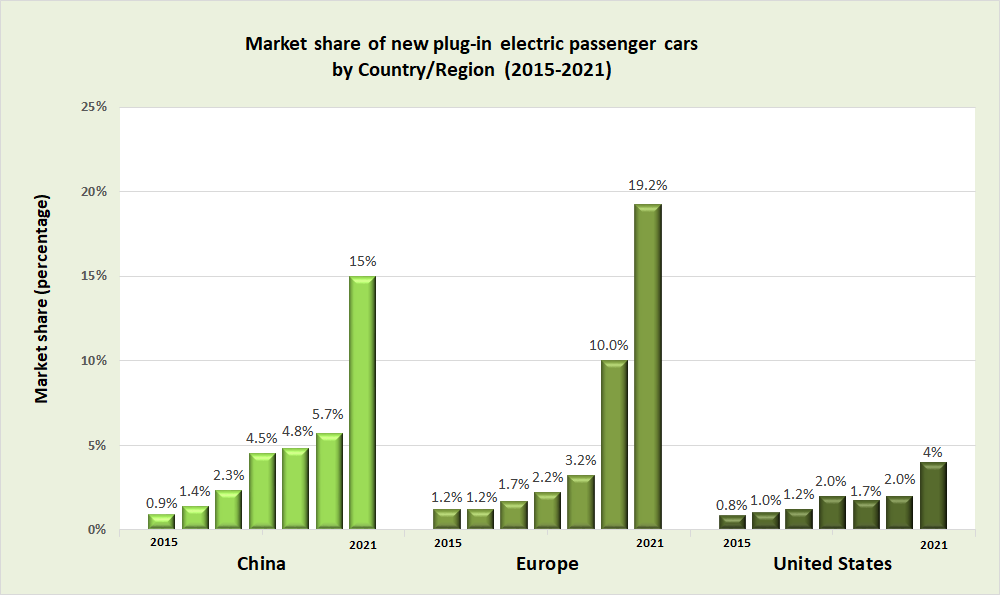
Market share of new plug-in electric passenger cars in China, Europe and the United States between 2015 and 2021

The adoption of plug-in electric vehicles in Europe is actively supported by the European Union and several national, provincial, and local governments in Europe. A variety of policies have been established to provide direct financial support to consumers and manufacturers; non-monetary incentives; subsidies for the deployment of charging infrastructure; and long term regulations with specific targets. In particular, the EU regulation that set the mandatory targets for average fleet CO_{2} emissions for new cars has been effective in contributing to the successful uptake of plug-in cars in recent years

Europe had about 5.6 million plug-in electric passenger cars and light commercial vehicles on the road at the end of 2021. The European stock of plug-in cars is the world's second largest after China, accounting for about 32% of the global stock in 2021.

Europe also has the world's second largest light commercial electric vehicle stock, 33% of the global fleet in 2020, As of December 2020, France listed as the European country with the largest stock of light-duty all-electric utility vans, with about 62,000 units, followed by Germany (29,500), and the UK (almost 15,000).

The plug-in passenger car segment had a market share of 1.3% of new car registrations in 2016, rose to 3.6% in 2019, and achieved 11.4% in 2020. Despite the segment's rapid growth, as of December 2020, only 1% of all passenger cars on European roads were plug-in electric.

As of December 2021, Germany led cumulative sales in Europe with 1.38 million plug-in cars registered since 2010, followed by France (786,274), the UK (~745,000), Norway (647,000), and the Netherlands (390,454). Norway has the highest market penetration per capita in the world, also has achieved the world's largest plug-in segment market share of new car sales, 86.2% in 2020, and 22% of all passenger cars on Norwegian roads were plug-ins by the end of 2021. Germany was the top selling European country market in terms of annual volume from 2019 to 2023, but was overtaken by the UK in 2024.

In 2020, and despite the strong decline in global car sales brought by the COVID-19 pandemic, annual sales of plug-in passenger cars in Europe surpassed the 1 million mark for the first time. Also, Europe outsold China in 2020 as the world's largest plug-in passenger car market for the first time since 2015.

== Government incentives and policies ==
The European Union and several national, provincial, and local governments around Europe have introduced policies to support the mass market adoption of plug-in electric vehicles. A variety of policies have been established to provide direct financial support to consumers and manufacturers; non-monetary incentives; subsidies for the deployment of charging infrastructure; procurement of electric vehicle for government fleets; and long term regulations with specific targets.

=== Financial incentives ===
Financial incentives for consumers aim to make plug-in electric car purchase price competitive with conventional cars due to the still higher up front cost of electric vehicles. Among the financial incentives there are one-time purchase incentives such as tax credits, purchase grants, exemptions from import duties, and other fiscal incentives; exemptions from road, bridge and tunnel tolls, and from congestion pricing fees; and exemption of registration and annual use vehicle fees. There are also several non-monetary incentives such as allowing plug-in vehicles access to bus lanes, free parking and free charging.

As of May 2019, tax benefits and incentives for electrically chargeable passenger cars were available in 24 out of the then 28 European Union member states. Nevertheless, only 12 member states offered bonus or grant payments as purchase incentives, and most countries only grant tax reductions or exemptions for all-electric cars. Croatia, Estonia, Lithuania, and Poland offered no incentives.

French bonus–malus

France introduced in 2008 a bonus–malus CO_{2} based tax system that penalize fossil-fuel vehicle sales. This a revenue-neutral policy mechanism allows to balance government support with direct revenues from the taxes collected from sale of particularly polluting and/or greenhouse gas emitting cars. The bonus applies to private and company vehicles purchased on or after 5 December 2007, and is deducted from the purchase price of the vehicle. The malus penalty applies to all vehicles registered after 1 January 2008, and is added at the time of registration.

=== EU average fleet CO_{2} emissions ===
European Union Directive No 443/2009 set a mandatory average fleet CO_{2} emissions target for new cars, after a voluntary commitment made in 1998 by the auto industry had failed to reduce emissions by 2007. The regulation applies to new passenger cars registered in the European Union and EEA member states for the first time. A carmaker who fails to comply has to pay an "excess emissions premium" for each vehicle registered according with the amount of g/km of exceeded.

The 2009 regulation set a 2015 target of 130 g/km for the fleet average for new passenger cars. A similar set of regulations for light commercial vehicles was set in 2011, with an emissions target of 175 g/km for 2017. Both targets were met several years in advance. A second set of regulations, passed in 2014, established a new target of average CO_{2} emissions of new cars to fall to 95 g/km, scheduled to be phased-in in 2020 (95%), and fully apply from 2021 onward. The target for light-commercial vehicles was set to 147 g/km by 2020.

In April 2019, Regulation (EU) 2019/631 was adopted, which introduced CO_{2} emission performance standards for new passenger cars and new light commercial vehicles for 2025 and 2030. The new Regulation went into force on 1 January 2020, and has replaced and repealed Regulation (EC) 443/2009 and (EU) No 510/2011. The 2019 Regulation set new emission targets relative to a 2021 baseline, with a reduction of the average CO_{2} emissions from new cars by 15% in 2025 (81 g/km), and by 37.5% in 2030 (59 g/km). For light-commercial vehicles the new targets are a 15% reduction for 2025 and a 31% reduction for 2030.

The 2019 Regulation also introduced an incentive mechanism or credit system from 2025 onwards for zero- and low-emission vehicles (ZLEVs). A ZLEV is defined as a passenger car or a commercial van with CO_{2} emissions between 0 and 50 g/km. The regulation set ZLEV sales targets of 15% for 2025 and 35% for 2030, and manufacturers have some flexibility in how they achieve those targets. Carmakers that outperform the ZLEV sales targets will be rewarded with higher CO_{2} emission targets, but the target relaxation is capped at a maximum 5% to safeguard the integrity of the regulation.

Since 2018, European carmakers have been fully embracing electrification of their car models to further reduce CO_{2} emissions, and comply with the targets established by the EU. The EU regulations have resulted in a significant growth of sales of plug-in electric cars since 2019.

In 2020, despite a strong decline of overall car sales in all countries as a result of the COVID-19 pandemic, the plug-in car segment has increased significantly its market share. According to the European Automobile Manufacturers Association (ACEA), during the first quarter of 2020, and due to the COVID‐19 outbreak, the market share of new passenger plug-in electric cars in the 27 EU countries was 6.8%, up from 2.5% in the same period in 2018. In April 2020 the European plug-in market share rose to 11%.

Norwegian case

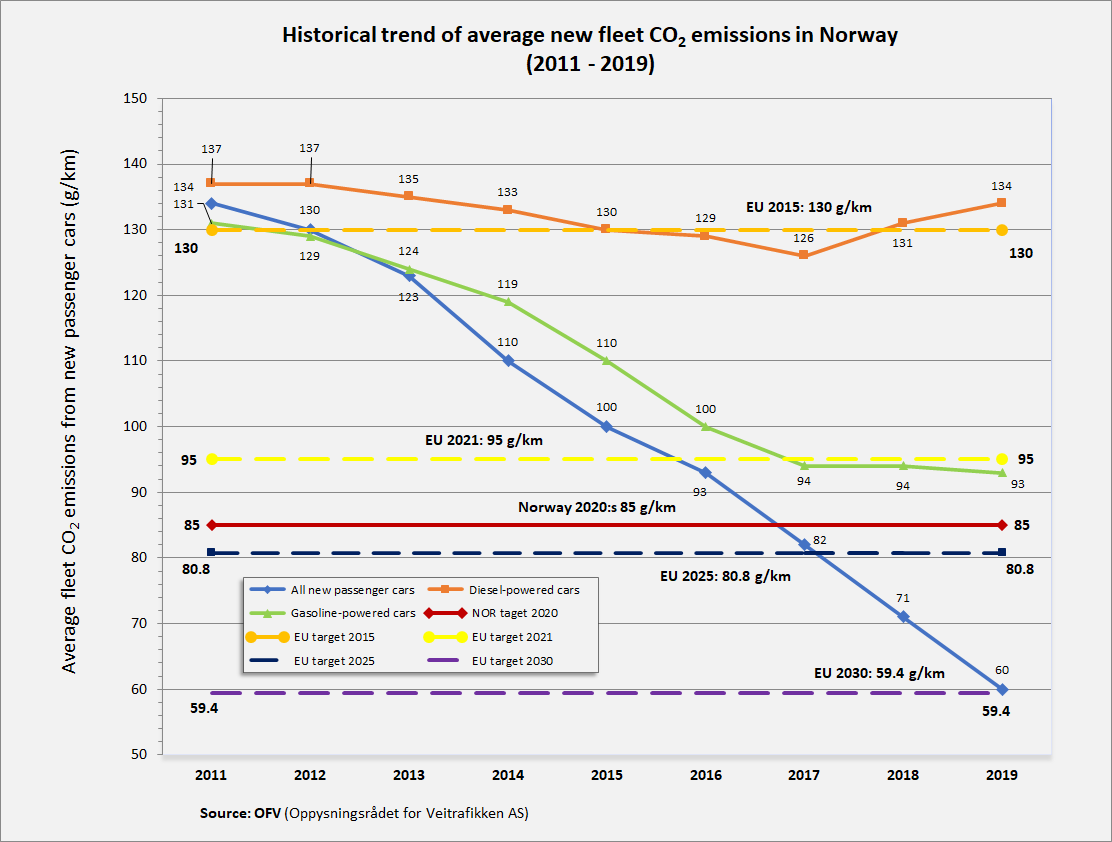
Historical trend of annual average new fleet CO_{2} emissions in Norway (2011–2019). Source: Norwegian Road Federation (OFV)

In order to reduce Norway's greenhouse gas emissions, its government pledged in 2012, among other measures, a target for the average fleet CO_{2} emission rate of new passenger cars of 85 g/km by 2020, 10 g/km lower than the European Commission's targets for 2021.

As a result of its fast growing EV market penetration, average fleet CO_{2} emissions have been falling in Norway every year. Norway achieved in 2016 the European target set for 2021, with average CO_{2} emissions for all new passenger cars registered in 2016 of 93 g/km, down 7 g/km from 2015. Average CO_{2} emissions for all new passenger cars registered in 2017 was 82 g/km, down from 93 g/km in 2016, and below the government's target of 85 grams set for 2020. Norway achieved its transportation emissions target three years before the pledged deadline.

Annual average new passenger car fleet CO_{2} emissions reached an all-time low in 2019 with 60 g/km, 11 g/km lower than in 2018. Nevertheless, the average for gasoline-powered cars declined only 1 g/km from 2018 to 93 g/km, while diesel-powered cars increase their average CO_{2} emissions from 131 g/km in 2018 to 134 g/km in 2019. The net gain in the overall reduction of average fleet CO_{2} emissions is the result of the large market share of 42.4% achieved by the all-electric segment in 2019.

=== Phase-out of fossil fuel vehicles ===
Timeline of national targets for full ICE phase out or 100% ZEV car sales
Selected countries	Year
Norway (100% ZEV sales)	2025
Denmark	2030
Iceland	2030
Ireland	2030
Netherlands (100% ZEV sales)	2030
Sweden	2030
United Kingdom	2030
France	2040
Germany (100% ZEV sales)	2050

Several European governments have made long term pledges with compliance targets within a specific timeframe such as ZEV mandates and the phase out of internal combustion engine vehicle sales. For example, Norway set a national goal that all new car sales by 2025 should be zero emission vehicles (electric or hydrogen).

Some cities are planning to establish a partial or total ban on internal combustion engine vehicles or to implement zero-emission zones (ZEZ) restricting traffic access into an urban cordon area or city center where only zero-emission vehicles (ZEVs) are allowed access. In such areas, all internal combustion engine vehicles are banned.

As of May 2020, cities planning to gradually introduce ZEZ, or a partial or total ban fossil fuel powered vehicles include, among others, Amsterdam (2030), Athens (2025), Barcelona (2030), Brussels (2030/2035), Copenhagen (2030), London (2020/2025), Madrid (2025), Milan (2030), Oslo (2024/2030), Oxford (2021–2035), Paris (2024/2030), and Rome (2024/2030).

=== Other policies ===
There are also measures to promote efficient vehicles in the Directive 2009/33/EC of the European Parliament and of the Council of 23 April 2009 on the promotion of clean and energy-efficient road transport vehicles, and in the Directive 2006/32/EC of the European Parliament and of the Council of 5 April 2006 on energy end-use efficiency and energy services.

The 2009 Directive applies to contracting entities under the obligation to apply the procurement procedures set out in Directives 2004/17/EC and 2004/18/EC, as well as operators of public passenger transport services by rail and by road under a public service contract within the meaning of Regulation (EC) No 1370/2007 of the European Parliament and of the Council of 23 October 2007. These entities and operators should take into account lifetime energy and environmental impacts, including energy consumption and emissions of CO_{2}, and of certain pollutants, when purchasing road transport vehicles with the objectives of promoting and stimulating the market for clean and energy efficient vehicles.

== Markets and sales ==
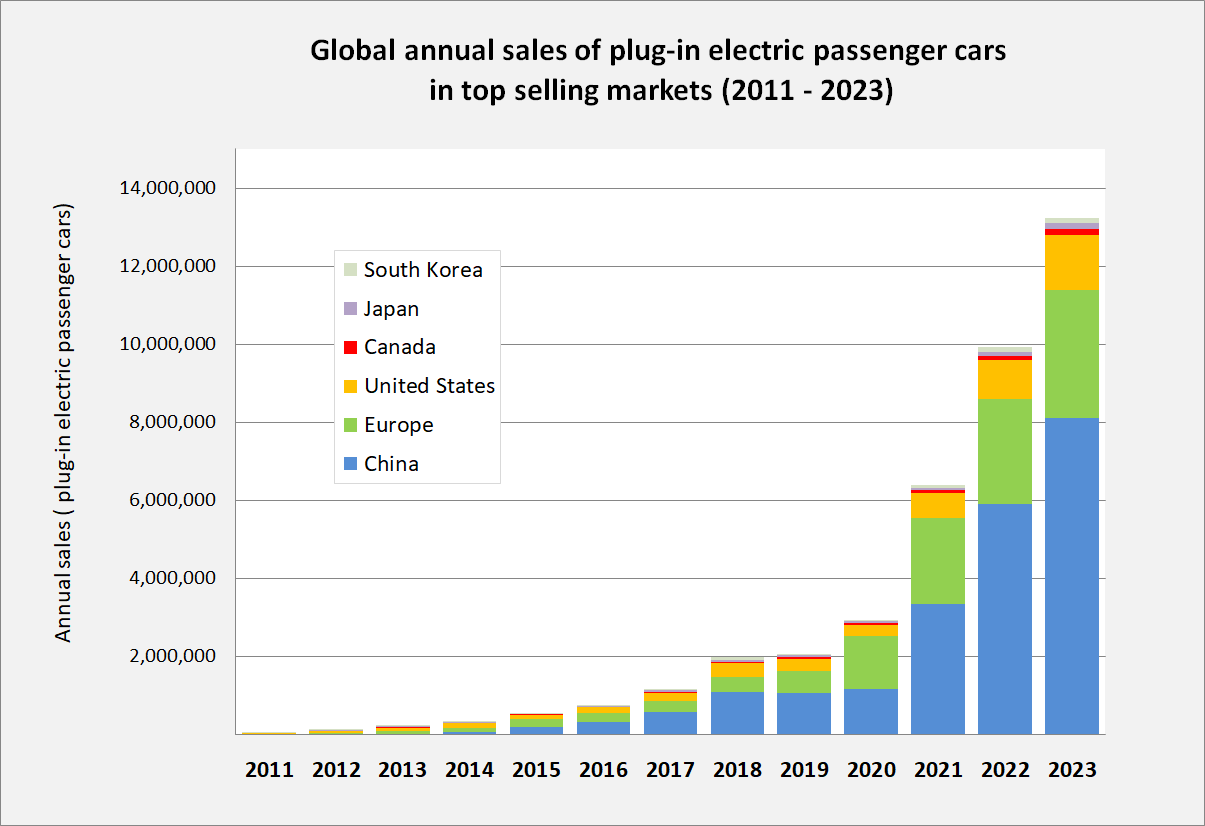
Annual sales of plug-in passenger cars in Europe compared to the world's top country markets between 2011 and 2023

Europe had about 5.6 million plug-in electric passenger cars and light commercial vehicles in circulation at the end of 2021, consisting of 2.9 million fully electric passenger cars, 2.5 million plug-in hybrid cars, and about 220,000 light commercial all-electric vehicles. As of December 2020, the European stock of plug-in passenger is the world's second largest market after China, accounting for 32% of the global car stock in 2020 Europe outsold China in 2020 as the world's largest plug-in passenger car market for the first time since 2015.

Europe also has the second largest electric light commercial vehicle stock, 33% of the global stock in 2020. As of December 2020, France listed as the European country with the largest stock of light-duty electric commercial vehicles, with about 62,000 utility vans in use, and also ranks as the world's second after China.

Since 2016 the plug-in passenger car segment has experienced rapid growth, with annual registrations increasing 33% in 2018, 45% in 2019, and 137% in 2020. The plug-in segment had a market share of 1.3% of new car registrations in 2016, rose to 3.6% in 2019, and achieved 11.4% in 2020. Despite the segment's rapid growth, as of December 2020, only 1.0% of passenger cars on European roads were plug-in electric vehicles, and just 0.3% of light commercial vehicles on the EU roads were fully electric in 2019.

Cumulative light-duty plug-in electric vehicle sales in Europe compared to the world's top-selling countries and regional markets as of December 2021. Europe is the world's second largest plug-in market after China.

Cumulative sales of light-duty plug-in electric vehicles in Europe passed the 500,000 unit mark in May 2016, the one million milestone in June 2018, and the two million mark in April 2020. Norway passed the 100,000th registered plug-in unit milestone in April 2016, France passed the same milestone in September 2016, and the Netherlands in November 2016. The UK achieved the 100,000 unit mark in March 2017.

Norway was the top selling plug-in country market in terms of annual sales from 2016 to 2018. In 2019, Germany surpassed Norway as the best selling plug-in market, leading both sales of the all-electric and the plug-in hybrid segments, and again in 2020, Germany listed as the top selling European country market, with a record of over 394,000 units sold. The only country that outsold Germany in 2020 was China, and France and the UK ranked among the top five best selling countries.

As of December 2021, Germany is the European country with the largest stock of plug-ins in the continent, with 1.38 million plug-in passenger cars registered since 2010. Ranking next is France with 786,274 light-duty plug-in electric vehicles, followed by the UK with about 745,000 plug-in cars, and Norway with 647,000 light-duty plug-in electric vehicles. Norway continues to have the highest market penetration per capita in Europe and the world, and in 2021 achieved the world's largest annual plug-in segment market share of new car sales ever, 86.2%. Also, Norway has the highest share of plug-in cars in use in the world, with 22.1% of all passenger cars on the road by the end 2021.

The following table summarizes annual registrations of light-duty plug-in electric vehicles in the region, including the European Union, the UK, and three EFTA countries, from 2010 to 2021:

Annual registrations of light-duty plug-in electric vehicles in Europe (EU + EFTA + UK) by type of powertrain (2010 – 2021)
Year	Total BEV (M1 + N1)^{(1)}	Growth (BEVs)	Total PHEV (M1)^{(2)}	Growth (PHEVs)	Total PEV^{(3)}	Growth (PEVs)	PEV market share^{(4)}
2010	2,919	–	0	-	2,919	-	0.01%
2011	13,779	372.0%	304	–	14,083	382.5%	0.08%
2012	24,713	79.4%	9,620	3,064%	34,333	143.8%	0.23%
2013	40,496	63.9%	31,447	226.9%	71,943	109.5%	0.53%
2014	65,199	61.0%	39,547	25,8%	104,746	45.6%	0.75%
2015	97,687	49.6%	96,436	143.9%	194,120	85.3%	1.41%
2016	102,625	5.1%	112,999	17.2%	215,624	11.1%	1.35%^{(5)}
2017	149,086	45.3%	153,297	35.7%	302,383	40.2%	1.74%^{(5)}
2018	222,999	49.6%	185,631	21.1%	408,630	35.1%	2.5%
2019	388,868	74.4%	199,707	7.1%	588,575	44.0%	3.6%
2020	784,683	101.8%	619,129	210.0%	1,403,812	138.5%	11.4%
2021	1,287,776	64.1%	1,045,022	68.8%	2,332,798	66.2%	19.2%
Cumulative sales	3,180,807	–	2,488,134	–	5,668,939	–	–
Fleet in use 2020^{(6)}	1,868,614	–	1,394,915	–	3,263,529	–	–
Notes: (1) Battery electric vehicles (BEV) includes all-electric passenger cars and utility vans. (2) ACEA figures only include plug-in passenger cars registered in the European Union, the UK, and EFTA countries. (3) Includes all-electric passenger cars, all-electric utility vans, and plug-in hybrid passenger cars. (4) Market share of the plug-in passenger segment of total new car sales (utility vans not included). (5) New passenger vehicle registrations in the EU and EFTA totaled 15,131,719 units in 2016 and 15,631,687 in 2017. (6) Light-duty plug-in electric fleet in circulation at the end of 2020.

=== 2010–2015 ===
A total of 1,614 all-electric cars and 1,305 light-utility vehicles were sold in 2010. Sales jumped from 2,919 units in 2010 to 13,779 in 2011, consisting of 11,271 pure electric cars and 2,508 commercial vans. In addition, over 300 plug-in hybrids were sold in 2011, mainly Opel Amperas. Light-duty plug-in vehicle sales totaled 34,333 units in 2012, consisting of 24,713 all-electric cars and vans, and 9,620 plug-in hybrids. The Opel/Vauxhall Ampera plug-in hybrid was Europe's top selling plug-in electric car in 2012 with 5,268 units, closely followed by the all-electric Nissan Leaf with 5,210 units.

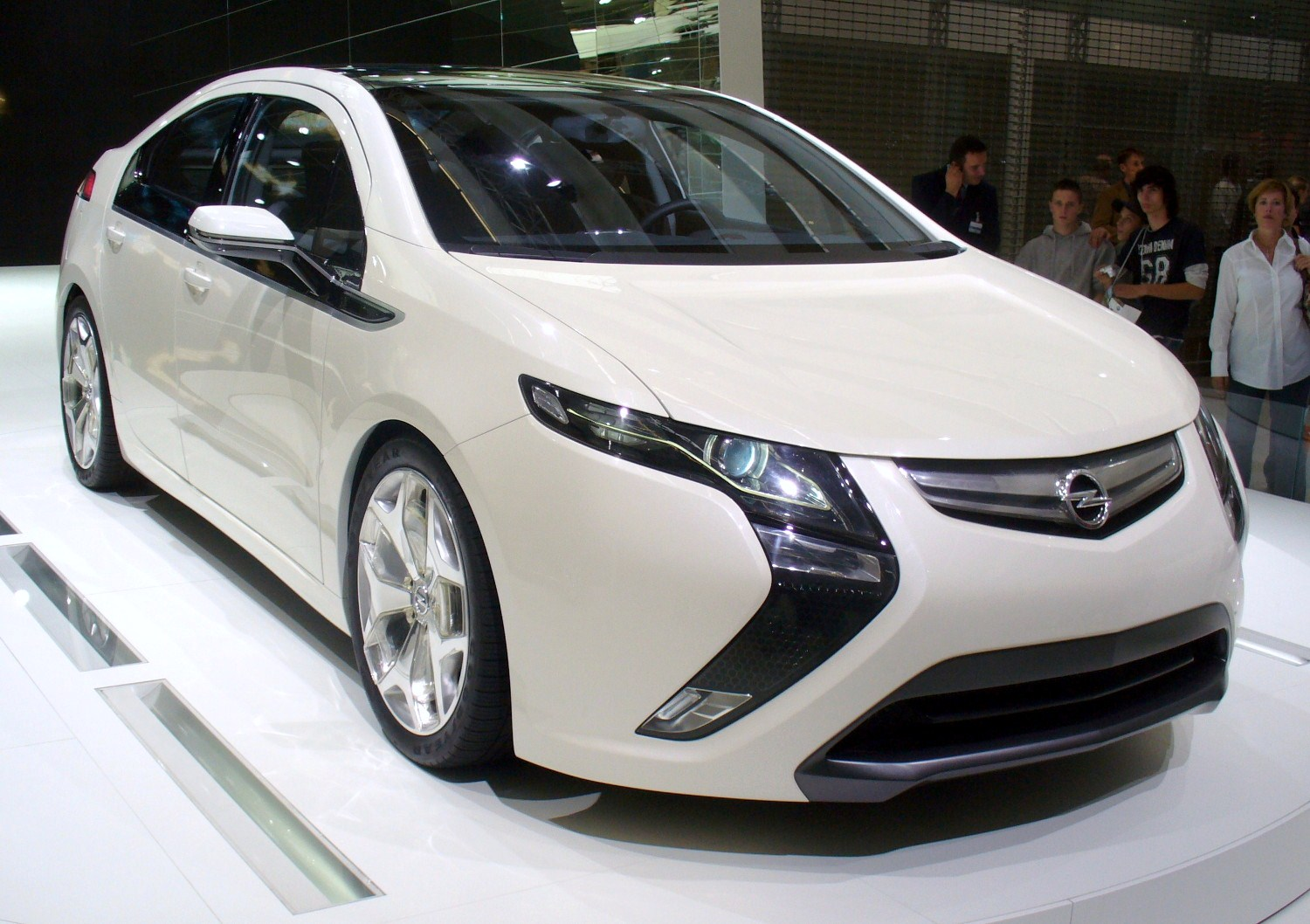
The Opel Ampera plug-in hybrid was the top selling plug-in electric car in Europe in 2012 with 5,268 units.

The plug-in segment sales more than double to 71,943 units in 2013. Pure electric passenger and light commercial vehicles sales increased by 63.9% to 40,496 units. In addition, a total of 31,477 extended-range cars and plug-in hybrids were sold in 2013. Registrations reached 104,746 light-duty plug-in electric vehicles in 2014, up 45.6% from 2013. A total of 65,199 pure electric cars and light-utility vehicles were registered in Europe in 2014, up 60.9% from 2013. All-electric passenger cars represented 87% of the European all-electric segment registrations. Extended-range cars and plug-in hybrid registrations totaled 39,547 units in 2014, up 25.8% from 2013.

During 2013 took place a surge in sales of plug-in hybrids in the European market, particularly in the Netherlands, with 20,164 PHEVs registered during the year. Out of the 71,943 highway-capable plug-in electric passenger cars and utility vans sold in the region during 2013, plug-in hybrids totaled 31,447 units, representing 44% of the plug-in electric vehicle segment sales that year. This trend continued in 2014. Plug-in hybrids represented almost 30% of the plug-in electric drive sales during the first six months of 2014, and with the exception of the Nissan Leaf, sales of the previous European best selling models fell significantly, while recently introduced models captured a significant share of the segment sales, with the Mitsubishi Outlander P-HEV, Tesla Model S, BMW i3, Renault Zoe, Volkswagen e-Up!, and the Volvo V60 Plug-in Hybrid (available as a diesel–electric hybrid) ranking among the top ten best selling models.

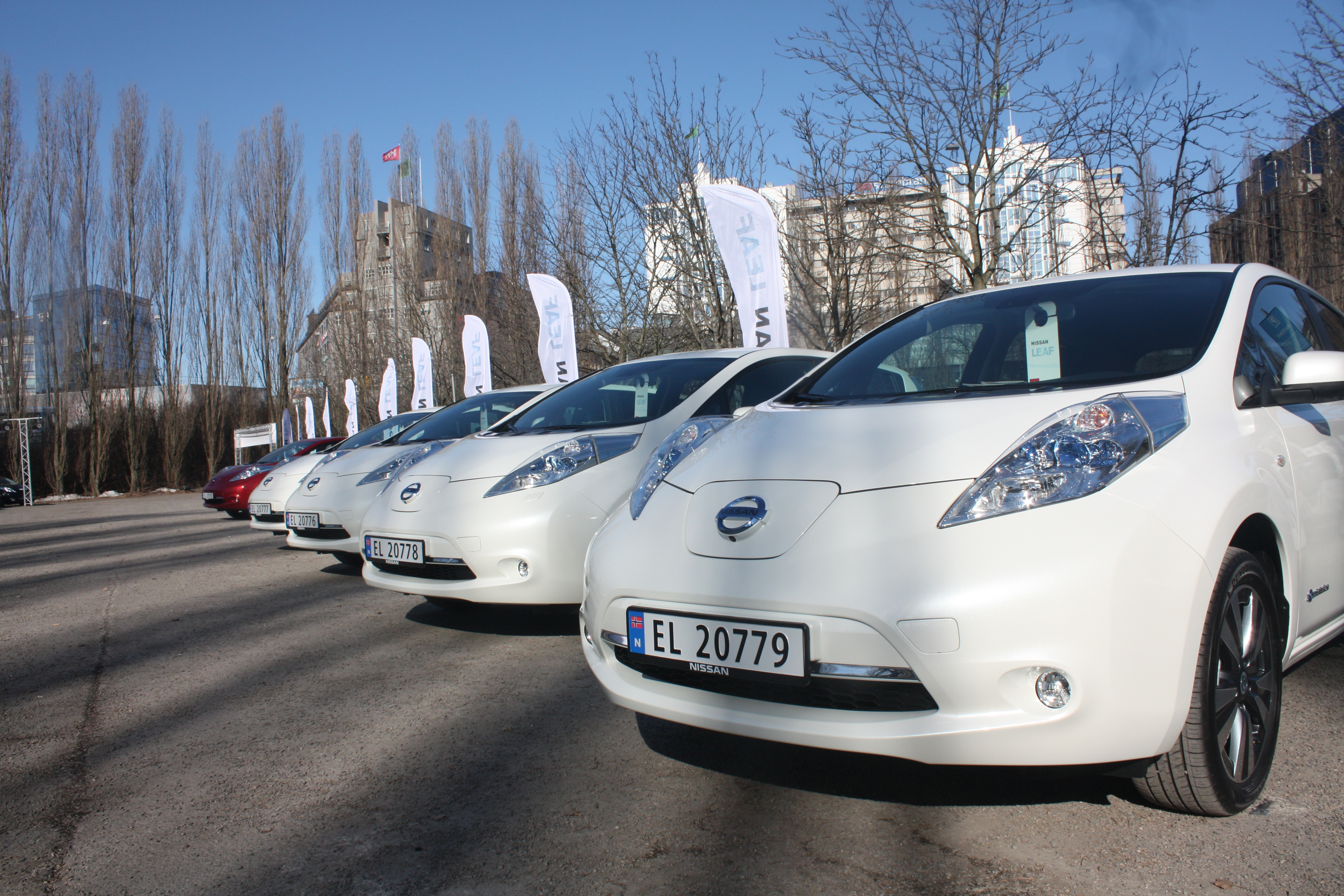
The Nissan Leaf was the top selling plug-in car in Europe in 2013 with 11,120 units sold.

In 2014 Norway was the top selling country in the light-duty all-electric market segment, with 18,649 passenger cars and utility vans registered, more than doubling its 2013 sales. France ranked second with 15,046 units registered, followed by Germany with 8,804 units, the UK with 7,730 units, and the Netherlands with 3,585 car and vans registrations. In the plug-in hybrid segment, the Netherlands was the top selling country in 2014 with 12,425 passenger cars registered, followed by the UK with 7,821, Germany with 4,527, and Sweden 3,432 units. Five European countries achieved plug-in electric car sales with a market share higher than 1% of new car sales in 2014, Norway (13.84%), the Netherlands (3.87%), Iceland (2.71%), Estonia (1.57%), and Sweden (1.53%).

In 2013 the top selling plug-in was the Leaf with 11,120 units sold, followed by the Outlander P-HEV with 8,197 units. The Mitsubishi Outlander plug-in hybrid was the top selling plug-in electric vehicle in Europe in 2014 with 19,853 units sold, surpassing of the Nissan Leaf (14,658), which fell to second place. Ranking third was the Renault Zoe with 11,231 units.

For a second year running, the Mitsubishi's Outlander P-HEV was the top selling plug-in electric car in Europe with 31,214 units sold in 2015, up 57% from 2014. The Renault Zoe ranked second among plug-in electric cars, with 18,727 registrations, and surpassed the Nissan Leaf to become best selling pure electric car in Europe in 2015. Ranking next were the Volkswagen Golf GTE plug-in hybrid (17,300), followed by the all-electric Tesla Model S (15,515) and the Nissan Leaf (15,455), the BMW i3, including its REx variant, (12,047), and the Audi A3 e-tron plug-in hybrid (11,791).

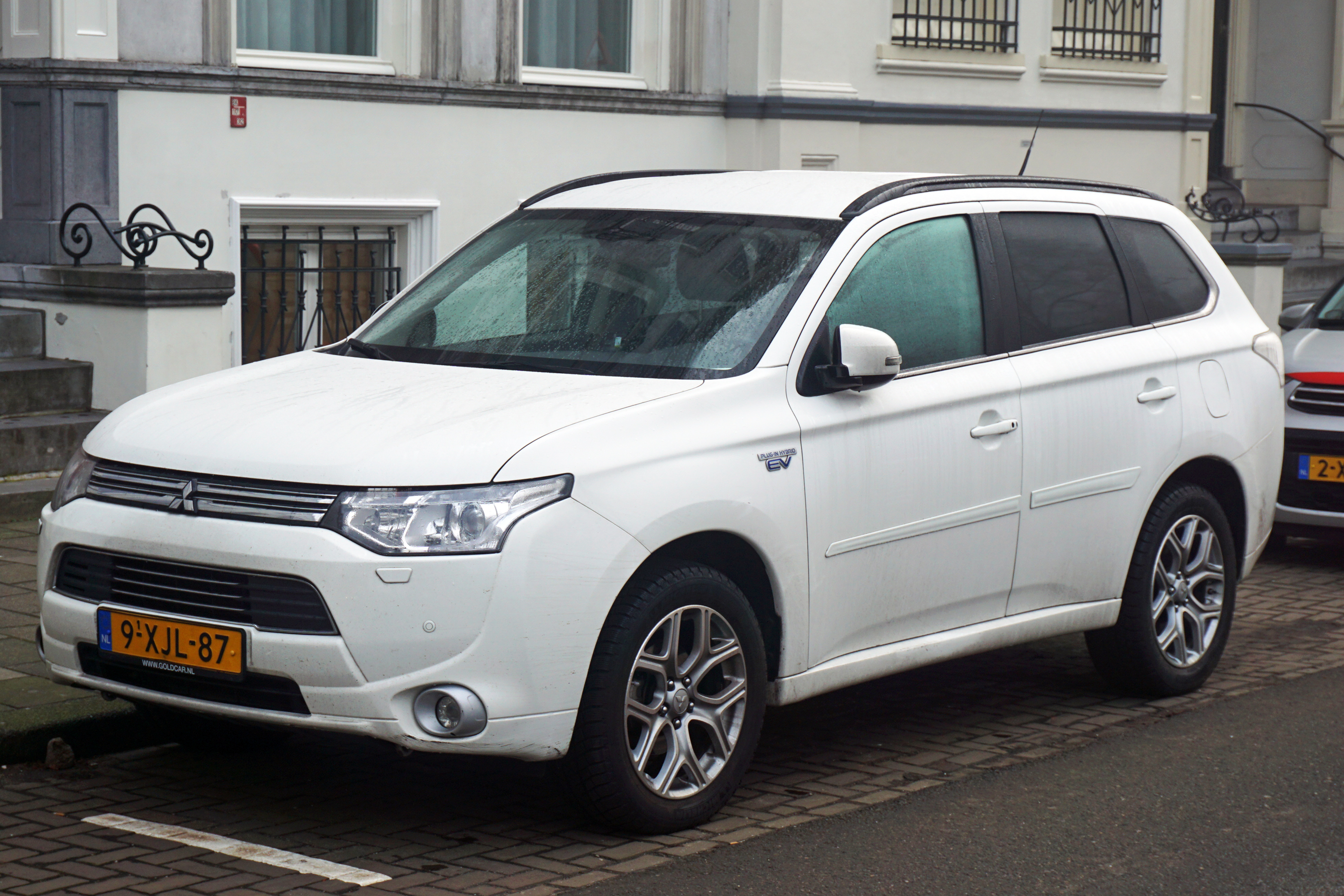
The Mitsubishi Outlander P-HEV was Europe's top selling plug-in car in 2014 and 2015, and until 2017, it was the region's all-time best-selling plug-in electric car with 100,097 units.

The Netherlands was the top selling country in the European light-duty plug-in electric market segment, with 43,971 passenger cars and utility vans registered in 2015. Norway ranked second with 34,455 units registered, followed by the UK with 28,188 units, France with 27,701 car and vans registrations, and Germany with 23,464 plug-in cars. Eight European countries achieved plug-in electric car sales with a market share higher than 1% of new car sales in 2015, Norway (22.4%), the Netherlands (9.7%), Iceland (2.9%), Sweden (2.6%), Denmark (2.3%), Switzerland (2.0%), France (1.2%) and the UK (1.1%). As of December 2015, almost 25% of the European plug-in stock was registered in the Nordic countries, with over 100,000 units registered. In 2015, combined registrations in the four countries were up 91% from 2014.

For the first time in the region, in 2015 plug-in hybrids (95,140) outsold all-electric cars (89,640) in the passenger car segment, however, when light-duty plug-in utility vehicles are accounted for, the all-electric segment totaled 97,687 registrations in 2015, up 65,199 in 2014, and ahead of the plug-in hybrid segment. Also in 2015, the European market share of plug-in electric cars passed the 1% mark for the first time, with a 1.41% share of new car sales that year. This trend continue during 2016. Since April 2016 plug-in hybrids have outsold all-electric cars, and the gap has continued to widen. Accounting for passenger plug-in car sales in Western Europe between January and July 2016, plug-in hybrids captured almost 54% of the region's plug-in market sales. During 2016 the all-electric car segment ended with a market share of 0.57% of new car sales, while plug-in hybrids reached a market share of 0.73%.

=== 2016–2017 ===
European sales of plug-in electric cars passed 200,000 units for the first time in 2016. The plug-in segment achieved a market share of 1.3% of total new car sales in 2016. Norway was the top selling plug-in car country in Europe in 2016 with 45,492 plug-in cars and vans registered, followed by the UK with about 36,907 units, France with 33,774, Germany with 25,154, the Netherlands with 24,645, and Sweden with 13,454. France was the top selling market in the light-duty all-electric segment with 27,307 units registered, up 23% from 2015. The plug-in car segment of ten European countries achieved a market share of new car sales above 1%, led by Norway with 29.1%, followed by the Netherlands with 6.4%, Sweden with 3.5%, and Switzerland with 1.8%.

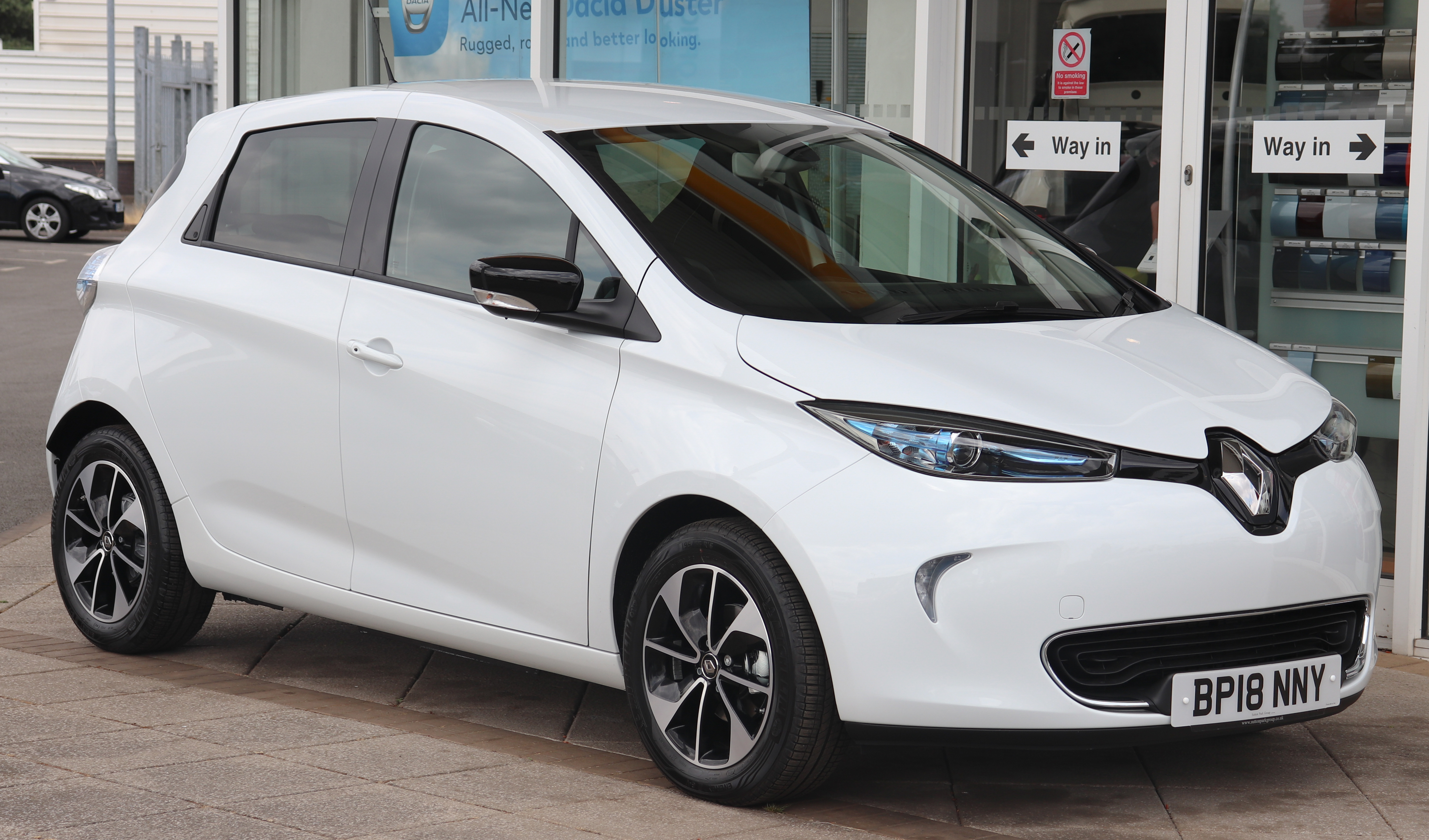
The Renault Zoe has been the top selling plug-in electric car in Europe for two years in a row, 2016 and 2017.

The Renault Zoe was the best-selling all-electric car in Europe in 2016 with 21,735 units delivered, and also topped European sales in the broader plug-in electric car segment, ahead of the Outlander P-HEV, the top selling plug-in in the previous two years. The Mitsubishi Outlander PHEV with 21,446 units sold was the second best-selling plug-in car, followed by the Nissan Leaf with 18,718. The Outlander PHEV has been Europe's best-selling plug-in hybrid vehicle for four years in a row, from 2013 to 2016. The top selling all-electric commercial van was the Nissan e-NV200 with 4,319 units registered.

Registrations totaled 302,383 units in 2017, of which, 149,086 (49.3%) were all-electric cars and vans, and 153,297 (50.7%) were plug-in hybrid cars. The segment market share achieved a record 1.74% in 2017. Accounting for new registrations of plug-in passenger cars, Norway was Europe's top selling country in 2017 with 62,313 units, followed by Germany with 54,617, which more than doubled in 2017 and moved ahead of French and the British markets for the first time ever. Ranking next were the UK with 47,298, France with 36,835, and Sweden with 19,678 units. Norway also led the all-electric car segment with 33,025 new units registered, up 36.3% from 2016, and the UK led the plug-in hybrid car segment with 31,154 registrations, up 25.1% from 2016.

In 2017, sales in the Netherlands fell by 51.7% from 2016 due to changes in tax rules, and as a result, it was overtaken by both Sweden (+48.4%) and Belgium (+59.2%). Denmark was the only other significant plug-in car market with weaker sales in 2017, down 30.1% from 2017 with the fall also due to a change in taxes. In addition to Germany, plug-in car sales also doubled in Spain (+104.6%) and Portugal (+121.2%), and sales also increased sales significantly in Italy (+71.2%).

Among all-electric cars, the top selling model was the Renault Zoe with 31,302 units, followed by the Nissan Leaf with 17,293. Combined sales of BMW i3 pure electric and REx models totaled 20,855 units, making the i3 Europe's second best selling plug-in car in 2017 after the Zoe. The best selling plug-in hybrids were the Outlander P-HEV with 19,189 units, the VW Passat GTE with 13,599 and the Mercedes Benz GLC 350e with 11,249.

As of December 2017, the Mitsubishi Outlander P-HEV continues to rank as the all-time top selling plug-in electric car in the region with 100,097 units delivered since its launch in 2013, followed by the Renault Zoe with 91,927 units, the Nissan Leaf with 84,947 units, The Renault Kangoo Z.E. is the all-time top selling all-electric utility van with 29,150 units sold through December 2017.

=== 2018–2019 ===
Plug-in passenger car registrations totaled 558,649 units in 2019, up from 385,293 in 2018. The plug-in segment market share rose form 2.5% in 2018 to 3.7% in 2019. Registrations in 2019 consisted of 359,796 all-electric cars (64.4%) and 198,853 plug-in hybrid cars (35.6%). Registrations of all-electric light-duty commercial vehicles totaled 28,704 in 2019, representing a market share of 1.2% of the segment new registrations, and was led by France with more than 8,000 units.

The new long-range Nissan Leaf was the top selling plug-in car in Europe in 2018 with over 40,000 units registered, and for the sixth consecutive year (2013–2018), the Mitsubishi Outlander PHEV was best selling plug-in hybrid in Europe. Sales in 2018 were led by Norway with 72,689 new passenger car registrations, followed by Germany with 67,658 units. During 2019 Germany, with 108,839 units registered, surpassed Norway (79,640) for the first time as the best selling country market in the European region.

The Tesla Model 3, launched in the European market in February 2019, ranked as the best selling plug-in car in Europe in 2019, with over 95,000 units delivered in its first year in that market, and outselling other key premium models. The Model 3 also set records in Norway and the Netherlands, listing in both countries not only as the top selling plug-in car but also as the best selling passenger car model in the overall market.

The sales volume achieved by the Model 3 in 2019 (15,683) is the third largest in Norwegian history, exceeded only by the Volkswagen Bobla (Beetle) in 1969 (16,706), and Volkswagen Golf in 2015 (16,388). The Model 3 set a new record in the Netherlands for the highest registrations in one month (22,137) for any single plug-in vehicle in Europe.

=== 2020 ===
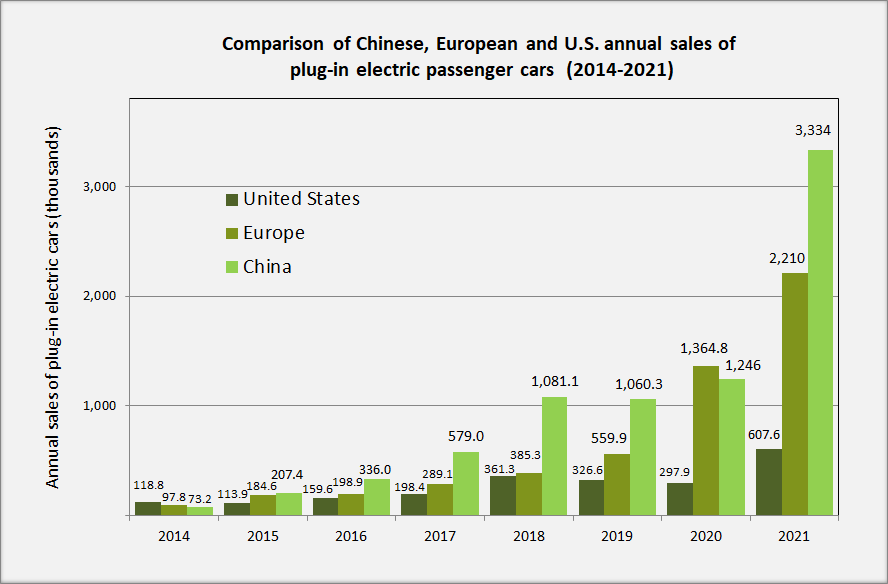
Comparison of annual plug-in electric passenger car sales between China, Europe, and the United States (2014 to 2021)

As a result of the COVID-19 pandemic, diesel and gasoline car sales in the European Union fell over 32% during the first quarter of 2020. Despite the overall decline caused by the outbreak, registrations of plug-in electric cars totaled 167,132 units across the EU, more than doubled (up 100.7%) compared to the same period in 2019. When plug-in car sales are accounted for combined registrations in the EU, EFTA countries and the UK, registrations were up 81.7% from the first quarter of 2019, consisting of 130,297 all-electric cars (up 58.2%) and 97,913 plug-in hybrids (up 126.5%).

Plug-in electric car sales in Europe skipped the overall car market decline for a variety of reasons. The impacts of the electric car incentives introduced in Italy in 2019 began to take effect in the market; Germany increased electric car purchase subsidies in February; and 2020 is the target year of the European Union's emissions standards, which limit average CO_{2} emissions per km driven of new car sales. As a result, in the first four months of 2020 plug-in car sales in the largest European car markets combined, France, Germany, Italy and the United Kingdom, were about 90% higher than in the same period the previous year.

As a result of the stimulus packages introduced by several government due to global economic recession caused by COVID-19, combined with the phase in of the EU CO_{2} regulations, plug-in car sales surged during the fourth quarter of 2020, with battery electric cars growing 207.4% compared with the same quarter of 2019, and plug-in hybrids up 262.3%.

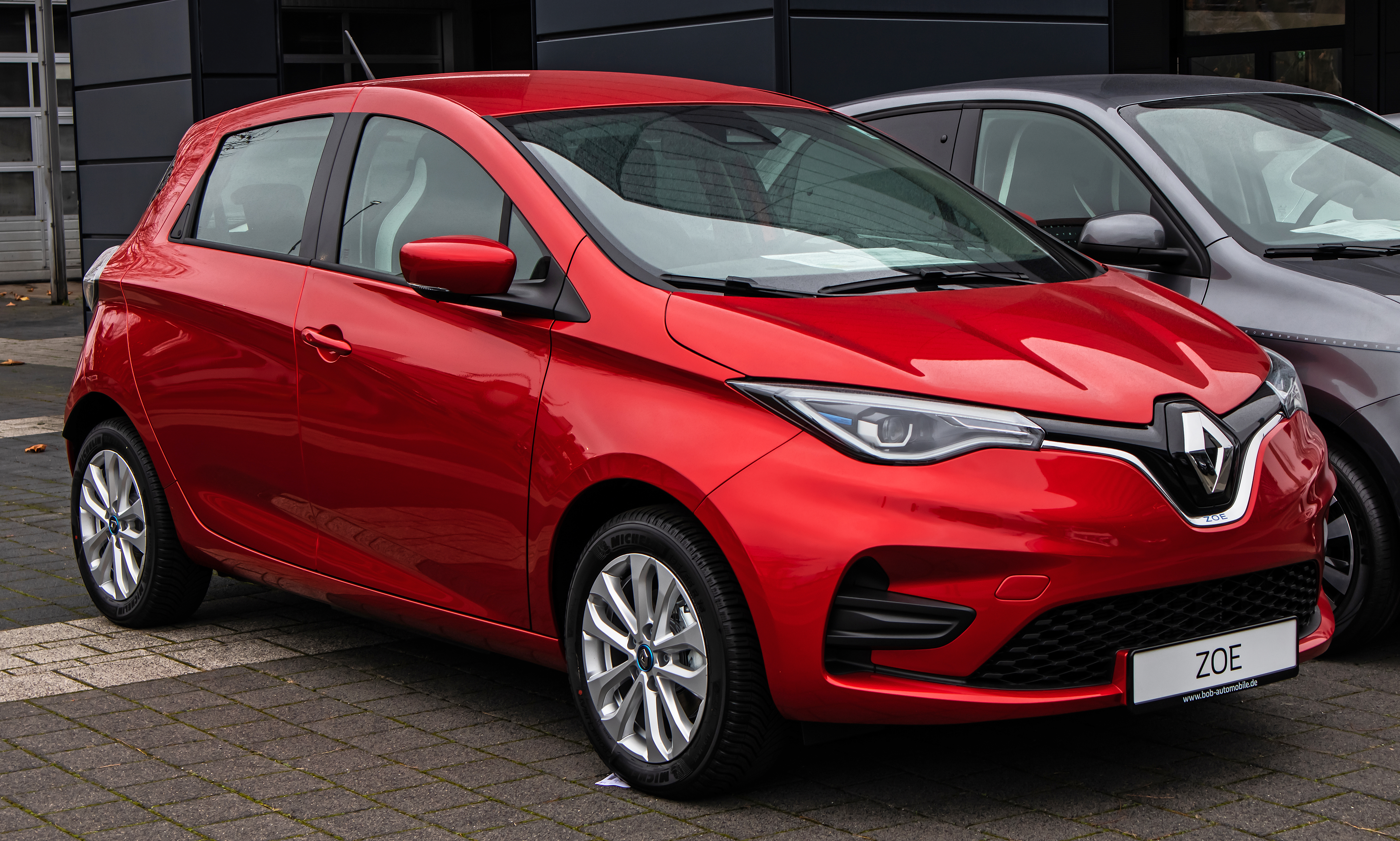
The Renault Zoe listed in 2020 as the top selling plug-in car in Europe, and it is the region's all-time best selling plug-in car, with over 284,000 units registered since 2012.

In 2020, total plug-in car registrations in the European Union, three EFTA countries and the UK passed the one million mark for the first time ever, totaling 1,364,813 units, up 143.8% from 2019. Registrations of fully electric cars totaled 745,684 units, up 107.0% from 2019, and plug-in hybrid cars a total of 619,129, up 210.0% from 2019. The region's plug-in market share achieved a record 11.4% in 2020. The surge in plug-in car sales allowed Europe to outsell China in 2020 as the world's largest plug-in passenger car market for the first time since 2015.

The top selling plug-in electric car in the region in 2020 was the Renault Zoe with 100,815 units registered. The Tesla Model 3 (85,713) ranked next, followed by the new Volkswagen ID.3 (56,118), Hyundai Kona EV (47,796), and the VW e-Golf (33,650). The top selling plug-in hybrid was the Mercedes-Benz A250e, with 29,427 units, followed by the Mitsubishi Outlander (26,673), which led the PHEV segment in 2019. As of December 2020, the fully electric Renault Zoe ranks as the all-time best selling plug-in electric car in Europe, with more than 284,000 units registered since its inception in 2012. As of November 2020, the plug-in light commercial vehicle segment is led by the Renault Kangoo Z.E. with 57,595 all-electric vans sold in Europe since 2010.

=== Top selling plug-in models ===
Top 20 selling light-duty plug-in electric vehicles in Europe (sales or registrations between 2010 and 2020)
All-time Ranking	Model	Total sales/ registrations	2021	2020	2019	2018	2017	2016	2015	2014	2013	2012^{(2)}	2011	2010
1	Renault Zoe	348,272	69,136	100,815	47,139	39,469	31,302	21,735	18,728	11,231	8,863	68		
2	Tesla Model 3	321,581	140,868	85,713	95,000									
3	Nissan Leaf	219,546	33,772	30,916	31,792	38,740	17,293	18,718	15,455	14,658	11,120	5,210	1,728	144
4	Mitsubishi Outlander P-HEV	185,758		26,673	34,729	24,457	19,189	21,446	31,214	19,853	8,197			
5	BMW i3	163,120	25,029	23,113	31,604	24,252	20,855	14,999	12,047	9,744	1,477			
6	Volkswagen ID.3	128,841	72,723	56,118										
7	Volkswagen e-Golf	117,256		33,650	28,710	21,252	12,663	6,543	11,110	3,328				
8	Hyundai Kona EV	116,946	42,920	47,796	22,667	3,563								
9	Kia eNiro	105,948	64,790	31,019	10,139									
10	Tesla Model S	86,781	456	5,562	8,635	17,386	16,026	10,567	15,515	8,734	~3,900			
11	Peugeot e208	73,737	42,450	31,287										
12	Audi e-tron	65,562	20,632	26,454	18,483									
13	BMW 330e iPerformance	64,045		26,180	11,820	7,237	10,117	8,691						
14	Volkswagen Passat GTE	63,374		26,421	5,321	0	13,599	13,110	4,922	1				
15	Renault Kangoo Z.E.	57,598		9,923	10,111	8,414	4,233	3,901	4,238	4,197	5,850	5,260	991	
16	Tesla Model X	41,380	496	6,253	7,861	12,694	10,396	3,680						
17	Jaguar I-Pace	41,036	8,079	13,916	12,722	6,319								
	Volkswagen Golf GTE													
	BMW 225xe Active Tourer	29,858			13,138	10,805	5,915							
	Mercedes-Benz A250e	29,427		29,427										
	Audi A3 e-tron	28,209				8,356	6,908	11,791	1,154					
	Volvo V60 Plug-in Hybrid	25,694				1,677^{(1)}	4,119	6,349	5,441	8,066	42			
	Mercedes-Benz C 350 e	22,049				6,861	10,125	5,006	57					
	Volvo XC90 T8	19,969				7,847	9,469	2,653						
Notes: (1) CYTD sales through July 2017 only. (2) The Opel Ampera plug-in hybrid was the top selling plug-in car in 2012 with 5,268 units. Sales ended in 2015. (3) European sales 2021 Electric Vehicles - carsalesbase.com

== By country ==
=== France ===
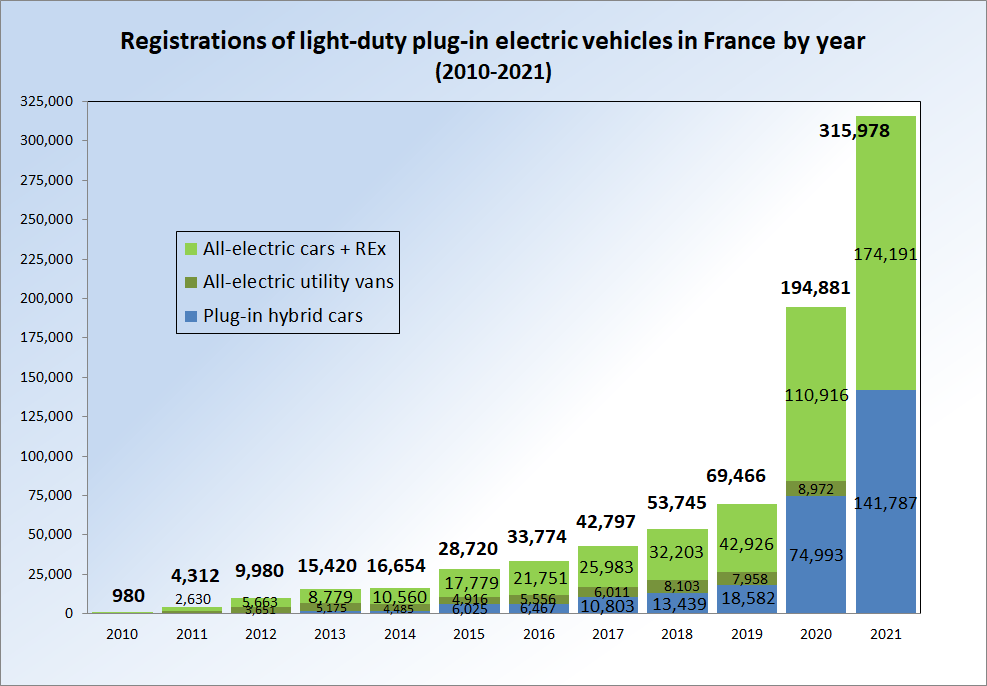
Annual registration of light-duty plug-in electric vehicles in France by type of vehicle between 2010 and 2021.

As of December 2021, a total of 786,274 light-duty plug-in electric vehicles have been registered in France since 2010, consisting of 512,178 all-electric passenger cars and commercial vans, and 274,096 plug-in hybrids. Of these, over 60,000 were fully electric light commercial vehicles.

The market share of all-electric passenger cars increased from 0.30% of new car registered in 2012, to 0.59% in 2014. After the introduction of the super-bonus for the scrappage of old diesel-power cars in 2015, sales of both pure electric cars and plug-in hybrids surged, rising the market share that year to 1.17%, 1.40% in 2016, 2.11% in 2018, 11.2% in 2020, and achieved a record market share of 18.3% in 2021.

As of December 2019, France is the European country with the largest market for light-duty electric commercial vehicles or utility vans, with a stock of almost 50,000 units. The large share of the light commercial market is the result of a national purchase incentive scheme, which French companies have embraced. The market share of all-electric utility vans reached a market share of 1.22% of new vans registered in 2014, 1.30% in 2015, and 1.77% in 2018.

=== Germany ===
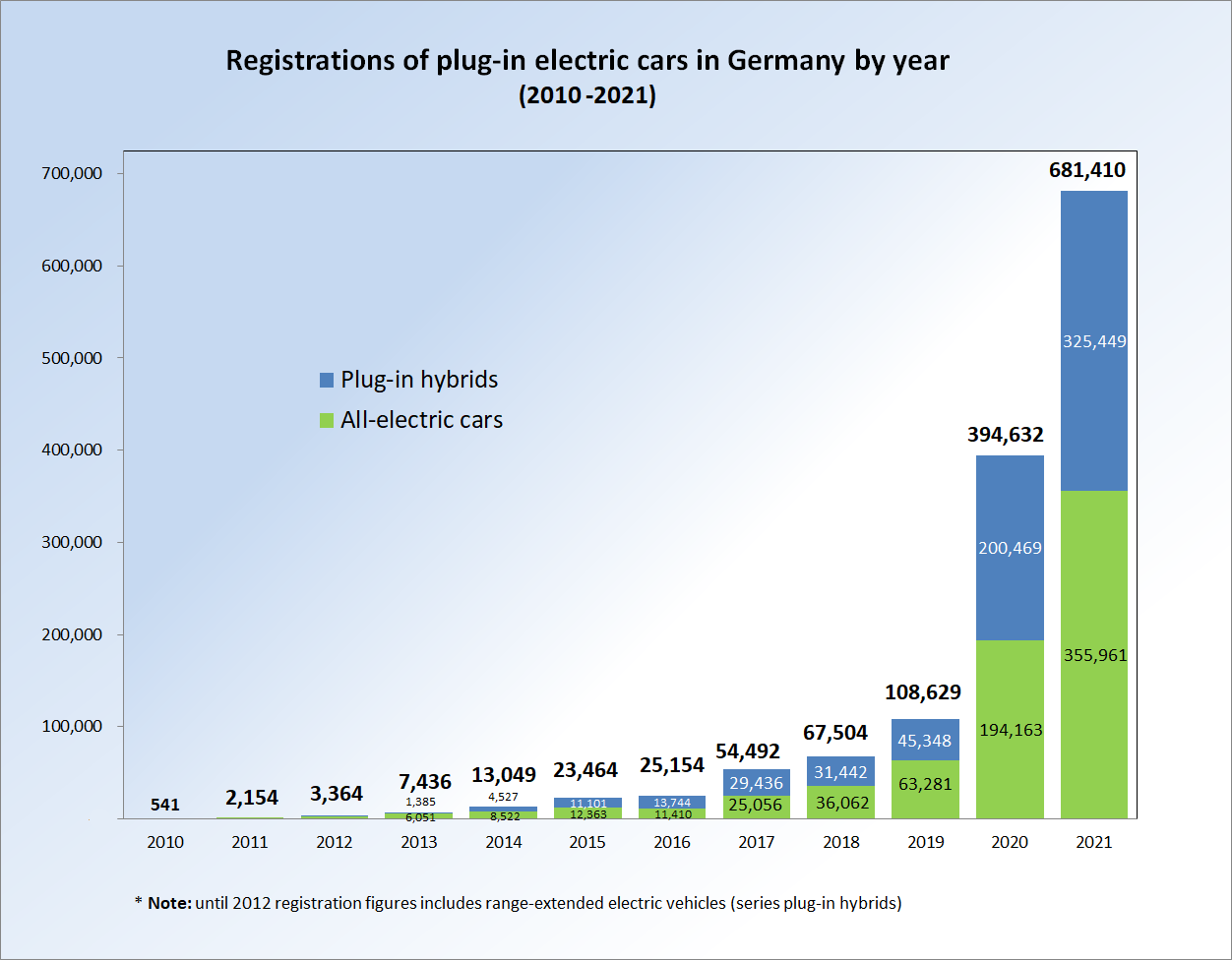
Annual registration of plug-in electric cars in Germany by type of powertrain between 2010 and 2021.

The stock of plug-in electric vehicles in Germany is the largest in Europe, there were 1,184,416 plug-in cars in circulation on January 1, 2022, representing 2.5% of all passenger cars on German roads, up from 1.2% the previous year. As of December 2021, cumulative sales totaled 1.38 million plug-in passenger cars since 2010. Germany had a stock of 21,890 light-duty electric commercial vehicles in 2019, the second largest in Europe after France.

The plug-in electric car segment market share was 1.58% in 2017, and rose to 3.10% in 2019. Despite the strong global decline in car sales brought by the COVID-19 pandemic, the uptake rate achieved a record 13.6% in 2020. In spite of the continued global decline in car sales due to the global chip shortage, a record 681,410 plug-in electric passenger cars were registered in Germany in 2021, and the segment's market share to surge to 26.0%.

Germany topped plug-in car sales in the European continent in 2019, overtaking Norway as the best selling plug-in market, and with a record volume of 394,632 plug-in passenger cars registered in 2020, up 263% from 2019, Germany listed for a second year in-a-row as the best selling European country market. The German market topped both the fully electric and plug-in hybrid segments. The only country that outsold Germany in 2020 was China.

The top selling electric models in 2020 were the Renault Zoe (30,376), VW e-Golf (17,438), and the Tesla Model 3 (15,202). The top selling all-electric model in 2021 was the Tesla Model 3 (35,262), and the best selling plug-in hybrid was the Mercedes GLK, GLC (33,719).

=== Netherlands ===
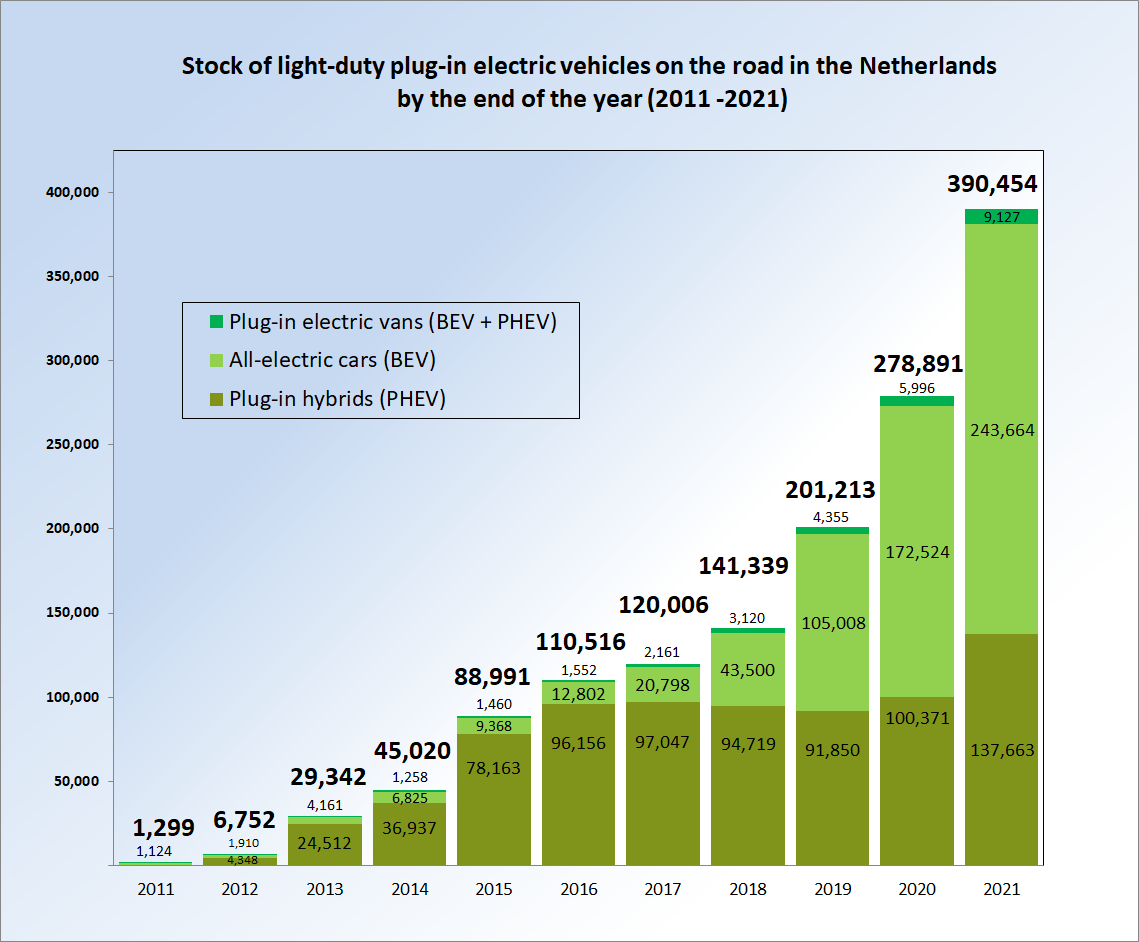
Stock of light-duty plug-in electric vehicles on the road in the Netherlands from 2011 to 2021.

As of 31 December 2021, there were 390,454 highway-legal light-duty plug-in electric vehicles in use in the Netherlands, consisting of 137,663 fully electric cars, 243,664 plug-in hybrid cars, and 9,127 light duty plug-in commercial vehicles. The fleet in circulation of plug-in electric passenger cars represented 4.3% of all passenger cars in Dutch roads at the end of 2021, up from 3.1% in 2020. As of December 2021, the Netherlands listed as the European country with the largest charging infrastructure per plug-in vehicle (EVSE/EV), with over 85,000 public charging points nationwide.

A distinct feature of the Dutch plug-in market was the dominance of plug-in hybrids until 2016. PHEVs represented 67% of the country's stock of passenger plug-in electric cars and vans registered at the end of December 2018, down from 81% in 2017. The shift to focus incentives on battery electric vehicles was due to a change in the tax rules in 2016 after it became apparent many users rarely charged their plug-in hybrids and only bought the cars for their tax advantage. Afterwards, fully electric cars led plug-in sales from 2019 to 2021.

The Netherlands listed as the world's third best-selling country market for light-duty plug-in vehicles in 2015, however, plug-in sales fell sharply in 2016 due to changes in tax rules, and as a result, the Netherlands was surpassed by both Norway and France during 2016. As a result of this change in the government incentives, the plug-in market share declined from 9.9% in 2015, to 6.7% in 2016, and fell to 2.6% in 2017. The intake rate rose to 6.3% in 2018 due to another change in tax rules from January 2019. The market share reached 14.9% in 2019, climbed to 24.8% in 2020 and achieved a record 29.8% in 2021.

=== Norway ===
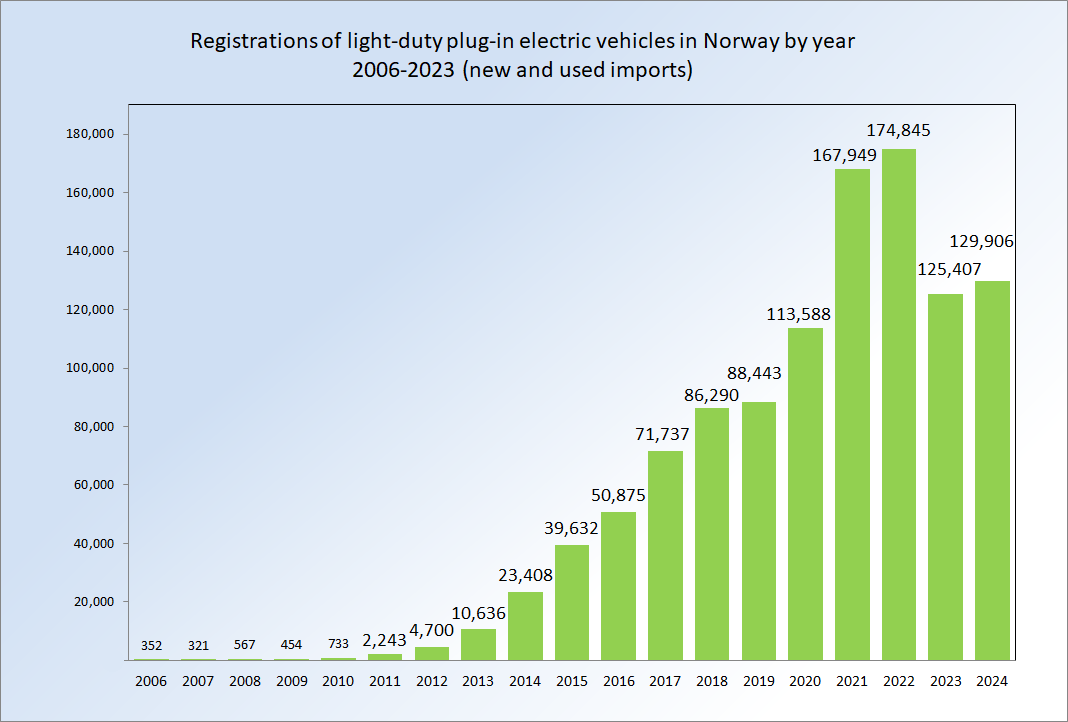
Registration of plug-in electric vehicles in Norway by year between 2004 and 2024. Includes plug-in hybrids, all-electric cars and vans, and used imports.

Norway is the country with the largest electric vehicle ownership per capita in the world. As of 31 December 2021, the stock of light-duty plug-in electric vehicles in Norway totaled 647,000 units in use, consisting of 470,309 all-electric passenger cars and vans (including used imports), and 176,691 plug-in hybrids. Until December 2019, Norway listed as the European country with the largest stock of plug-in cars and vans, and the third largest in the world. Norway was the top selling plug-in country market in Europe for three consecutive years, from 2016 to 2018.

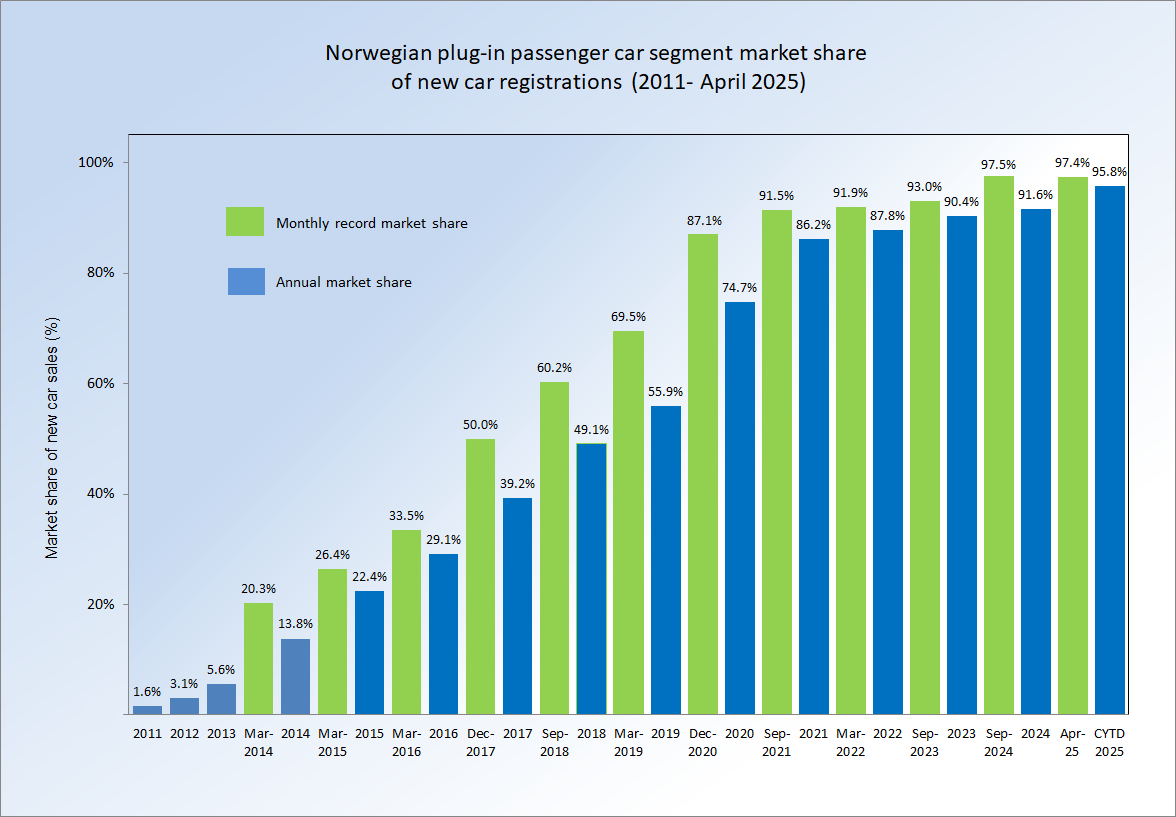
Historical evolution of the Norwegian plug-in electric car segment market share of new car sales and monthly records between 2011 and April 2025 (Source:OFV)

The Norwegian plug-in electric vehicle market share of new car sales has been the highest in the world for several years, achieving 29.1% in 2016, 39.2% in 2017, 49.1% in 2018, 55.9% in 2019 and 74.7% in 2020. In September 2021, the combined market share of the plug-in car segment achieved a new record of 91.5% of new passenger car registrations, 77.5% for all-electric cars and 13.9% for plug-in hybrids, becoming the world's highest-ever monthly plug-in car market share attained by any country. The segment market share in 2021 was 86.2%.

The Norwegian fleet of plug-in electric cars is one of the cleanest in the world because 98% of the electricity generated in the country comes from hydropower. In March 2014, Norway became the first country where one in every 100 registered passenger cars was a plug-in electric. The plug-in car market penetration reached 5% at the end of 2016, 10% in October 2018, and by the end of 2021, plug-in electric cars were 22.1% of all passenger cars on Norwegian roads.

The Nissan Leaf, with 12,303 units registered in 2018, listed as the Norway's best selling new passenger car model, marking the first time an electric car topped annual sales of the passenger car segment in any country. The following year, the Tesla Model 3 also topped annual passenger car sales, with 15,683 units registered. The sales volume achieved by the Model 3 in 2019 is the third largest in Norwegian history, exceeded only by the Volkswagen Bobla (Beetle) in 1969 (16,706), and Volkswagen Golf in 2015 (16,388). As of September 2021, the Leaf continues to be the all-time best selling plug-in electric car in Norway, with over 70,000 cumulative registrations since inception.

=== Sweden ===
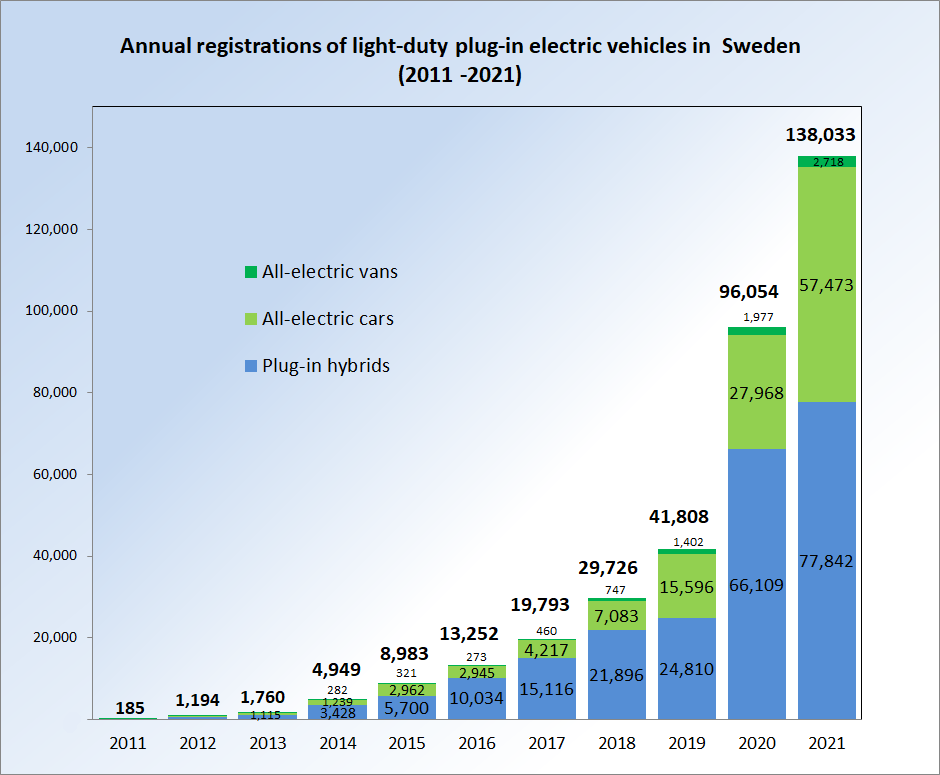
Plug-in electric vehicle annual registrations in Sweden between 2011 and 2021.

As of December 2021, a total of 355,737 light-duty plug-in electric vehicles have been registered since 2011, consisting of 226,731 plug-in hybrids, 120,343 all-electric cars and 8,663 all-electric utility vans. Sweden has ranked among the world's top ten best-selling plug-in markets since 2015, listed through 2019 as the ninth largest country market. As of December 2019, the Swedish stock of plug-in passenger cars listed as the sixth largest in Europe.

The Swedish plug-in electric market is dominated by plug-in hybrids, representing 75.1% of the Swedish light-duty plug-in electric vehicle registrations through 2018, but began to slightly decline afterwards, reaching 70.3% in 2020.

The plug-in passenger car segment had a market share of 5.2% of new registrations in 2017, rose to 11.3% in 2019, and achieved a record take rate of 32.2% in 2020.

In September 2011 the Swedish government approved a 200 million kr program, effective starting in January 2012, to provide a subsidy of 40,000 kr per car for the purchase of 5,000 electric cars and other "super green cars" with ultra-low carbon emissions, defined as those with emissions below 50 grams of carbon dioxide (CO_{2}) per km. After renewing appropriations for the super green car rebate several times, from 2016, only zero emissions cars are entitled to receive the full premium, while other super green cars, plug-in hybrids, receive half premium. Registrations of super clean cars increased five-fold in July 2014 driven by the end of the quota of 5,000 new cars eligible for the super clean car subsidy.

=== United Kingdom ===
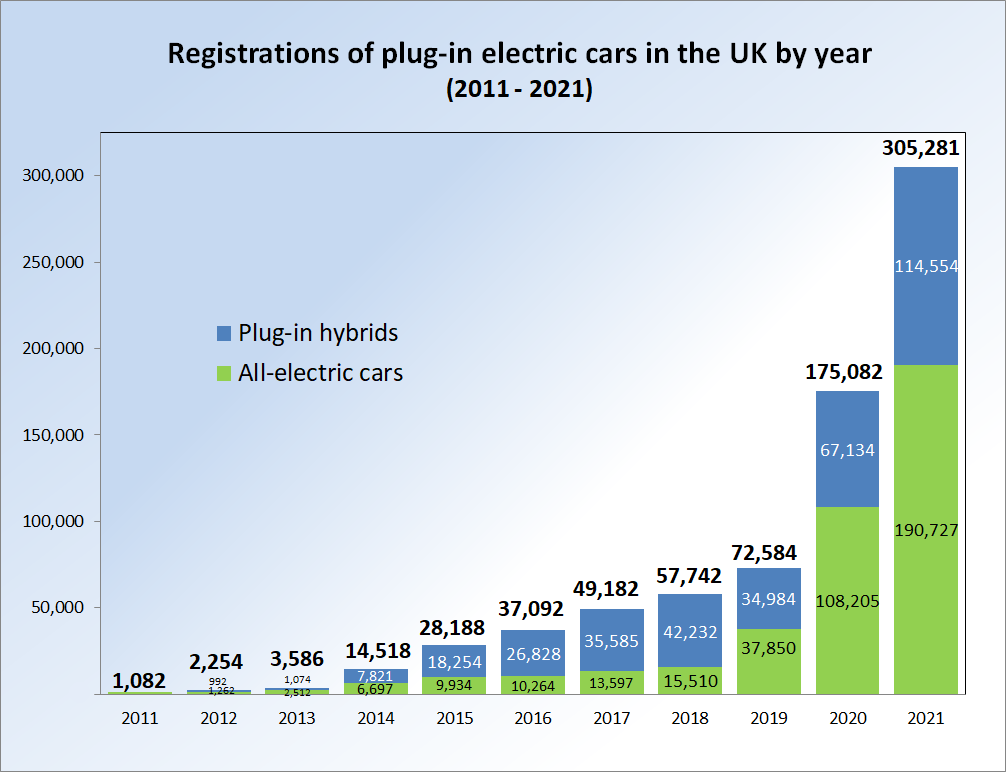
Registration of plug-in electric cars in the UK between 2011 and 2021.

About 745,000 light-duty plug-in electric vehicles had been registered in the UK up until December 2021, consisting of 395,000 all-electric vehicles and 350,000 plug-in hybrids. The adoption of plug-in electric vehicles in the United Kingdom is actively supported by the British government through the plug-in car and van grants schemes and other incentives. Since the launch of the Plug-In Car Grant in January 2011, a total of 176,962 eligible cars have benefited with the government's subsidy through September 2018, and, the number of claims made through the Plug-in Van Grant scheme, as of September 2018, totaled 5,218 units since the launch of the programme in 2012.

A surge of plug-in car sales took place in Britain beginning in 2014. Total registrations went from 3,586 in 2013, to 37,092 in 2016, and rose to 59,911 in 2018. Sales climbed to 72,834 plug-in cars in 2019, to 175,082 units in 2020, The market share of the plug-in segment went from 0.16% in 2013 to 0.59% in 2014, and achieved 2.6% in 2018. The segment market share was 3.1% in 2019, surged to 10.7% in 2020, and achieved a record 18.6% in 2021, despite the global strong decline in car sales brought by the COVID-19 pandemic.

As of June 2020, the Mitsubishi Outlander P-HEV is the all-time top selling plug-in car in the UK over 46,400 units registered, followed by the Nissan Leaf more than 31,400 units.

== International trade ==
=== European Union trade ===
In 2019, the European Union, 27 members, exported 8.2 billion euros of electric cars and imported 7.1 billion euros.

The 8.2 billion euros of electric cars were exported to United Kingdom (26%), Norway (22%), and the United States (19%).

The 7.1 billion euros of imported electric cars come from the United States (43% of imports in terms of value), South Korea (23%) and the United Kingdom (17%).

== See also ==
- Electric car use by country
- Government incentives for plug-in electric vehicles
- List of modern production plug-in electric vehicles
