= ACEA agreement =

The ACEA agreement refers to a voluntary agreement between the European Automobile Manufacturers Association (ACEA) and the European Commission to limit the amount of carbon dioxide (CO_{2}) emitted by passenger cars sold in Europe.

Signed in 1998, the agreement sought to achieve an average of 140 g/km of CO_{2} by 2008 for new passenger vehicles sold by the association's cars in Europe. This target represents a 25% reduction from the 1995 level of 186 g/km and is equivalent to a fuel economy of 5.8 L/100 km or 5.25 L/100 km for petrol and diesel engines respectively. However, the average for the whole car market for 2008 was 153.7 g/km, so the target has not been achieved.

Besides the agreement with ACEA, the European Commission also closed agreements with the Japan Automobile Manufacturers Association (JAMA) and Korea Automobile Manufacturers Association (KAMA). However, for the latter two the target date is 2009 instead of 2008 and as ACEA accounts for 86.4% of car sales in Europe, the impact of the latter two is much smaller.

The ultimate EU target to which these agreements are to contribute, is to reach an average CO_{2} emission (as measured according to Commission Directive 93/116/EC) of 130 g/km for all new passenger cars by 2015.

The European Commission announced in late 2006 that it is working on a proposal for legally binding measures and limits.

In February 2007, the commission acknowledged the failure of the voluntary agreement. Following this, a proposal of regulation was introduced by the commission on 19 December 2007.

== Implementation ==
The agreement defines fleet-average CO_{2} emission targets from new cars sold in the European Union, to be reached collectively by the members of the association. CO_{2} is the only gas covered by the agreements, other greenhouse gas emissions are currently not controlled (see carbon dioxide equivalent). How the target is to be achieved is not specified, and are expected by the commission to be mainly by technological developments and market changes linked to these developments.

Apart from the 140 g/km target, the ACEA should evaluate in 2003 the potential for additional improvements with a view to moving further towards the objective of emission targets:

- In the range of 165-170 g/km CO_{2} in 2003.
- 140 g/km of CO_{2} by 2008.
- 130 g/km of CO_{2} by 2015.

Concerning costs, a report for the European Commission last year showed that the cost of meeting the target for new cars of 120 g/km of CO_{2} would be on average €577 per car, which could be earned back in a few years time due to the improved fuel economy implied in the reductions.

== Progress towards the target ==
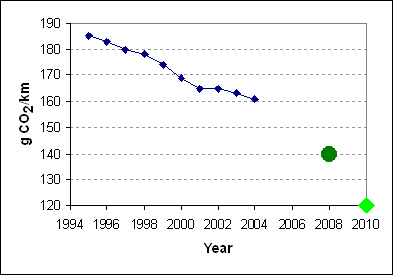
ACEA's progress towards the 140-g target (dark green), based on the commission's 2004 progress report. Also shown is the 120-g final target of EU (light green).

=== 2005 report ===
Fiat has already reached the 2008 goal, three years in advance (achieving 139 g/km). Citroen (144 g/km) and Renault (149 g/km) are on track to meet the 140 g/km commitment in 2008. Ford (151 g/km) and Peugeot (151 g/km) are almost on track. These brands were also relatively good performers in 1997 and yet still managed to reduce their CO_{2} emissions significantly.

=== 2007 report ===
Only Fiat was able to reach the 2008 planned goal of 140 g/km, with a value of 137.3 g/km. Peugeot (141.9 g/km) and Citroen (142.2 g/km) are still on track.

=== 2008 report ===
Only two brands were able to reach the 2008 planned goal of 140 g/km: Fiat, with a value of 133.7 g/km and Peugeot, with 138.1 g/km. The Fiat Auto Group (including the Fiat, Alfa Romeo, Lancia, Abarth, Ferrari and Maserati brands) was the only group to reach the planned value, averaging 138.4 g/km. The average for the whole car market for 2008 is 153.7 g/km, so the target has not been achieved.

=== 2009 report ===
More brands reached the (now expired) 2008 140 g/km goal: Fiat (127.8 g/km), Toyota (130.1 g/km), Peugeot (133.6 g/km), Renault (137.5 g/km), Citroen (137.9 g/km) and Ford (140.0 g/km). Fiat, however, was the only brand to reach the 2015 goal of 130 g/km, 6 years in advance. The Fiat Auto Group (including the Fiat, Alfa Romeo, Lancia, Abarth, Ferrari and Maserati brands) averaged to 131.0 g/km.

=== 2010 report ===
For the fourth year running, Fiat Automobiles is the brand that has recorded the lowest level of CO_{2} emissions by vehicles sold in Europe in 2010 as certified by the company JATO Dynamics. Fiat posted a mean value of 123.1 g/km and it also ranked first as Group, with 125.9 g/km and an improvement of 5 g/km compared to last year.

=== 2011 report ===
For the fifth year running, Fiat Automobiles is the brand that has recorded the lowest level of CO_{2} emissions by vehicles sold in Europe in 2011 as certified by the company JATO Dynamics. Fiat posted a mean value of 118.2 g/km, the first and only brand to reach the 120 g/km value, while other seven brands were able to reach the 130 g/km value. The average for the whole car market is 136.1 g/km.

=== 2012 report ===
For the sixth year running, Fiat Automobiles is the brand that has recorded the lowest level of CO_{2} emissions by vehicles sold in Europe in 2012 as certified by the company JATO Dynamics. Fiat posted a mean value of 119.8 g/km, still the only brand to reach the 120 g/km value, while other eight brands were able to reach the 130 g/km value. The average for the whole car market is 132.3 g/km.

== Longer-term target ==
The commission will support research efforts towards reaching the European Road Transport Research Advisory Council (ERTRAC) research target of "Improvements in vehicle efficiency [that] will deliver as much as a 40% reduction in CO_{2} emissions for passenger cars for the new vehicle fleet in 2020". This would correspond to a new car fleet average of 95 g/km of CO_{2} (COM/2007/19).

Some environmental groups insist on the need for a longer-term target that doubles fuel efficiency of new cars over the next decade, 80 g/km of CO_{2} by 2020.

== See also ==
- Biofuels directive
- Car taxation
- Conventional (Internal Combustion) Car Engine
- Emission standard
- European Common Transport Policy
- Energy policy of the European Union
- European exhaust emission standards
- Fuel efficiency
- Hybrid vehicle
- Oil dependence
- Proactive and reactive
- Vehicle efficiency.
