= Giorgio Garuzzo =

Italian electronics engineer, manager and industrialist

Giorgio Garuzzo, born in 1938 in Paesana, a small village in the Piedmont Alps near Cuneo, is an Italian electronics engineer, manager and industrialist, who took a central part in some of the most important developments in Italian industry in the past 50 years.

The Istituto Garuzzo per le Arti Visive (IGAV) is a non-profit organisation, established in 2005, funded and managed by his family with the object of supporting contemporary art and specifically to help young emerging Italian artists to become known in the international arena.

== The Olivetti/General Electric period ==
Garuzzo received a degree in Electronic Engineering after following the first graduation course in the than new discipline at the Politecnico di Torino (Polytechnic University of Turin) in November 1961, and joined the Laboratorio di Ricerche Elettroniche Olivetti in Borgolombardo, near Milan, where a host of researchers and engineers were developing the first family of Italian mainframe computers, a business idea of the visionary entrepreneur Adriano Olivetti. He worked on the Olivetti Elea 9003 and 6001 computers that allowed the first approach to informatics of more than 100 Italian large companies. When Olivetti was forced by supporting financial institutions to sell its electronic division to General Electric, Giorgio Garuzzo followed, working at Pregnana Milanese laboratories of General Electric Information System Italia (GEISI) as chief of the engineering planning department on the new computer generations GE115 and GE130, to be sold in some 5.000 units across the world.

== The Fiat period ==
In 1973 Garuzzo joined Gilardini, a listed holding company managed by a maverick entrepreneur, Carlo De Benedetti, who Gianni Agnelli, the charismatic Fiat chairman, suddenly and unexpectedly hired in 1976 as “amministratore delegato” (chief executive officer) of the Fiat group, the largest Italian private enterprise that employed at the time more than 300.000 people. When De Benedetti stayed in Fiat a mere 100 days, Giorgio Garuzzo, who had followed him as his personal advisor, remained 20 years, orchestrating some of the most important achievements of the Group in the period. In a book published in 2006 ("Fiat - I segreti di un'epoca") he describes the events and realisations of his Fiat experience, in the context of the Italian social and economical environment of the period 1976–1996.

In 1977 he promoted the merging of seven machine tools firms to create Comau SpA, a company specialized in welding equipment, whose “robogate” computerized and flexible manufacturing system (FMS) was to be widely used since the ‘80s to assemble cars by many makes all over the world.

Between 1979 and 1984, heading the Fiat Component Sector, Giorgio Garuzzo re-organized and managed more than 50 companies in the field of components for automotive and industrial applications, including promoting the development of the multi-point electronic controlled gasoline fuel injection system of Magneti Marelli SpA (the first European alternative to the offer from the German company Bosch), a product which gradually substituted the Weber carburators, which had been very successful in the past, but were becoming obsolete because less apt to fuel saving and emission control.

From 1984, as C.E.O., he managed the return to profitability of Iveco SA, the manufacturer of commercial vehicles and heavy trucks, and developed it with the acquisition and incorporation of Ford Truck and Seddon Atkinson in the UK, Pegaso in Spain, Ashok Leyland (the second largest producer of commercial vehicle in India, in conjunction with the Hinduja group) and Astra in Italy. The technology transfer and the joint venture for the production of diesel engines and the Iveco Daily light commercial vehicle that he signed in 1985 with the Nanjing Automobile Corporation was one of the first initiatives to be started under the new course of China towards a market economy inaugurated by Deng Xiaoping in the early ‘80s. The same year he signed a consortium with Oto Melara for the development of C1 Ariete battle tank and the B1 Centauro wheeled tank destroyer. He personally guided the program to re-design the full product range of Iveco products: vehicles from 3 tonne weight up to the 56 tonne maxi-code vehicle, and engines from 56 to 1250 HP. The R&D effort and the rationalisation of 22 plants in 5 countries of Europe was a major task that took five years to complete and cost more than 5 trillion Italian lire. Given the full range of product offer, Iveco became one of the two leaders of the European market, with 22% of market share in 1990.

In 1989, Garuzzo negotiated the acquisition of Ford New Holland, which had resulted from an earlier merging of Ford Tractor and New Holland Agriculture, a world leader in agricultural machinery. The integration with Fiat Geotech (which in turn included Fiat Trattori, Laverda and Hesston), led to the creation of a world leader under the simplified logo New Holland (later to become CNH).

In 1991, a year of deep crisis for the car sector Fiat Automobile, he was nominated chief operating officer (C.O.O. or “Direttore Generale”) of the Fiat group and chairman of Fiat Auto SpA, IVECO N.V. and New Holland N.V.

He was one of the founding members of ACEA, the European Automobile Manufacturers Association, which he chaired in 1994 and 1995.

In 1993, he was questioned by prosecutor Antonio Di Pietro in connection with the investigation called “Tangentopoli” or “Mani Pulite” with allegations of some bribery for the sale of buses by an Iveco dealer to the Milan communality, but he suffered no adverse judiciary consequences.

He was forced to leave Fiat in 1996, when the Group had recovered from the bottom of the crisis , after a disagreement with the incumbent Fiat C.E.O. Cesare Romiti, in whose regard he declared to hold "a different approach to life and business"

== Current activity ==
After working ten years in the private equity industry, in 2007 Garuzzo co-founded Mid Industry Capital, a holding company listed at the Milan Stock Exchange with a paid-in capital of €100 million, which he has chaired since the beginning. The company's aim is the acquisition of small or medium enterprises and their development in the medium-long term, by contributing funds, management and expertise, with a strong entrepreneurial attitude.

== The IGAV foundation ==
The “Istituto Garuzzo per le Arti Visive” (IGAV) non-profit organisation has been particularly active in art relations between Italy and China. Its main exhibitions included “Nature and Metamorphosis” (Shanghai, Beijing, and Spoleto, 2006), “Subtle Energy of Matter” (Shanghai, Beijing, Shenzhen, Seoul, and Saluzzo, 2008), “Behind Body Boundaries” (Moscow, 2008), “Contemporary Energy . Italian Attitudes” (jointly with Premio Terna, Shanghai, 2010), and a participation to the Shanghai Expo 2010. As an official participant to the “Year of China in Italy”, it contributed to organize the exhibition “China New Design” (Milan and Turin, 2011, with the Ullens Center for Contemporary Art).

IGAV permanent collections of contemporary art are located in the palace of Castiglia, the 13th-century castle of the Marquisate of Saluzzo, which also served as a prison in the 19th and 20th century.
