= European Automobile Manufacturers Association =

Automobile association

ACEA
- European Automobile Manufacturers Association
- Association des Constructeurs Européens d'Automobiles
- Formation: February 1, 1991; 35 years ago
- Legal status: Groupement d'intérêt économique
- Headquarters: Brussels, Belgium
- Website: www.acea.auto

The European Automobile Manufacturers Association (French: Association des Constructeurs Européens d'Automobiles; abbreviated ACEA) is the main lobbying and standards group of the automobile industry in the European Union. In February 1991 it became the successor of the CCMC manufacturers committee (French: Comité des Constructeurs du Marché Commun) which was founded in October 1972.

Its members include: BMW, DAF, Daimler Truck, Ferrari, Ford of Europe, Honda, Hyundai Motor Europe, Iveco, Jaguar Land Rover, Mercedes-Benz Group, Nissan, Renault, Toyota Europe, Volkswagen Group and Volvo Group.

One major area of ACEA work including its predecessor associations has been in performance quality classifications for 4-stroke engine oils. That history goes back to 1919 (Bureau Permanent International des Constructeurs d'Automobile – BPICA) that was renamed in 1985 (Organisation Internationale des Constructeurs d'Automobiles – OICA). The ACEA has its predecessor in the CCMC (Comité des Constructeurs du Marché Commun) founded in October 1972 by French (Citroën, Peugeot, Renault), German (Mercedes-Benz, Volkswagen), Italian (Fiat) and British (British Leyland) manufacturers.

As of 2016 ACEA was studying electric vehicle charging stations and expects that Type 2 Mode 3 connectors also to be used for home charging in the second phase after 2017 while still allowing Mode 2 charging with established plug types that are already available in home environments.

The group also raises awareness of vehicle safety technology to improve road safety.

In October 2025 ACEA announced the launch of ACEA:intelligence, "a new digital company providing comprehensive, authoritative data on Europe’s automotive industry".

== Former members ==
On 13 June 2022, Stellantis announced it would leave the European carmaker association ACEA by the end of 2022 as part of a new approach to addressing issues and challenges of future mobility, including a shift away from traditional lobbying activity.

On 8 July 2022 Volvo Cars announced to leave ACEA by the end of 2022, citing differences between its zero emission strategy and that of the ACEA.

== Presidents ==
The presidency has been rotated among French, Italian and German automobile manufacturers.

- Ola Källenius (Mercedes Group): 2025–
- Luca de Meo (Renault Group): 2022–2025
- Oliver Zipse (BMW Group): 2019–2021
- Carlos Tavares (PSA): 2018–2019
- Dieter Zetsche (Daimler): 2016–2017
- Carlos Ghosn (Renault): 2014–2015
- Philippe Varin (PSA): 2014
- Sergio Marchionne (Fiat) : 2012
- Dieter Zetsche (Daimler): 2010–2011
- Carlos Ghosn (Renault) 2009
- Christian Streiff (PSA) 2008
- Sergio Marchionne (Fiat) : 2006–2007
- Bernd Pischetsrieder (Volkswagen) : 2004–2005
- Louis Schweitzer (Renault): 2003
- Jean-Martin Folz (PSA): 2002
- Paolo Cantarella (Fiat / Ferrari): 2000–2001
- Ferdinand Piech (Volkswagen): 1999
- Bernd Pischetsrieder (BMW): 1998
- Louis Schweitzer (Renault): 1997
- Jacques Calvet (PSA): 1996
- Giorgio Garuzzo (Fiat): 1994 / 1995
- Helmut Werner (Daimler): 1993
- Eberhard von Kuenheim (BMW): 1992
- foundation year 1991 (predecessor "Comité des Constructeurs du Marché Commun")

== Research ==
Collaborative research activities of the automotive manufacturers and other efforts are carried out under the auspices of the European Council for Automotive Research and Development (EUCAR). Together with automotive suppliers, the automotive manufacturers support 30% of all research and development in the European Union.

EUCAR was founded in 1994 and is hosted within ACEA.

== See also ==
- ACEA agreement
- European emission standard
- Japan Automobile Manufacturers Association (JAMA)
- Korea Automobile Manufacturers Association (KAMA)
