= Kent Larson =

American architect

Kent Larson is an architect and Professor of the Practice at the Massachusetts Institute of Technology. Larson is currently director of the City Science research group at the MIT Media Lab, and co-director with Lord Norman Foster of the Norman Foster Institute on Sustainable Cities based in Madrid. His research is focused on urban design, modeling and simulation, compact transformable housing, and ultralight autonomous mobility on demand. He has established an international consortium of City Science Network labs, and is a founder of multiple MIT Media Lab spin-off companies, including Ori Living and L3cities.

== Architectural career ==
Larson practiced architecture in New York City beginning in 1981 with Peter L. Gluck and Partners. He was partner-in-charge of works including "Pavilions and pool at the Ludwig Mies van der Rohe house" in Weston, Connecticut and an addition to Uris Hall of the Columbia Business School at Columbia University in New York City.

=== Unbuilt Architecture ===
In 1993, Larson published "A Virtual Landmark" in Progressive Architecture, using radiosity lighting and material simulation software to create a virtual photographic study of Louis I. Kahn's as-yet unbuilt Hurva Synagogue in Jerusalem. This work was selected by Time (magazine) as a "Best Design of the Year" selection for 1993. Larson expanded this work into the book, Louis I. Kahn: Unbuilt Masterworks, which was selected by The New York Times Book Review as one of "The Ten Best Books in Architecture" for the year 2000.

== Academic career ==
Larson began research and teaching in 1998 at the MIT School of Architecture and Planning. He currently has a joint appointment with the MIT Media Lab and Department of Architecture.

=== CityHome ===
Larson introduced the CityHome concept in 2011, using full-scale home prototypes to test technologies for high-performance, personalized places of living in response to a housing crisis driven by a lack of affordable housing. The CityHome concept makes use of three independently configured layers: a high-performance chassis layer consisting of modular framing (construction) and utility services, an integrated infill layer that makes use of architectural robotics, and a responsive architecture layer that incorporates adaptive facade modules. In 2015 the CityHome research project was spun-off into Ori Living for commercialization in collaboration with designer Yves Béhar.

=== CityScope ===
The CityScope project is an open-source platform developed by Larson and his team to combine LEGO bricks in a tangible user interface with augmented reality and real-time simulation to support experts and non-experts in a new decision-making process to make better cities. CityScope applications have been deployed in cities around the world. In 2016 Larson partnered with the city of Hamburg and HafenCity University to use CityScope to bring together the residents of Hamburg, Germany to identify optimal locations to provide housing for a growing number of refugees of the Syrian Civil War. City residents used the CityScope interface to bring their local knowledge into the government's decision-making process in order to reduce social exclusion by locating refugees in proximity to existing communities and social services.

=== Lightweight Autonomous Mobility ===
Upon the 2010 death of William J. Mitchell, former Dean of the MIT School of Architecture and Planning, Larson continued work on the MIT CityCar, developing a full-scale prototype that integrated wheel hub motor technology, drive-by-wire control, front entry and egress, and mechanical folding so that three CityCars can fit in one parallel parking space. Larson's group worked with automotive suppliers in Spain to develop a commercial version of the MIT CityCar called Hiriko: a folding two-passenger vehicle with zero turning radius robot wheels for high maneuverability in urban areas.

Larson's team also developed a shared transport ultra-lightweight, autonomous, three-wheeled electric vehicle, called the "Persuasive Electric Vehicle" or "PEV". The PEV is designed to move both people and goods in cities, using human-robot interaction techniques to communicate awareness, trust, and empathy with pedestrians. Larson has since applied the principles of the PEV to the design of an electric autonomous bicycle that transforms into a self-driving tricycle for on-demand dockless bicycle sharing with fleet rebalancing.

=== Living Labs ===
Larson, along with colleagues William J. Mitchell, and Alex (Sandy) Pentland at MIT, is credited with first exploring the concept of a Living Laboratory for sensor-enabled research on human behavior. Living labs represent "a user-centric research methodology for sensing, prototyping, validating and refining complex solutions in multiple and evolving real life contexts."

Larson's living lab research focuses on developing computational tools to understand human behavior in natural environments, such as the PlaceLab, an apartment-scale living environment instrumented with sensing for data collection on applications that respond to human behavior, with an emphasis on proactive health, energy conservation, and the support of new ways of living and working.

Larson and researchers from his MIT lab received 10-Year Impact Awards from the Association for Computing Machinery Ubiquitous and Pervasive computing conferences in 2014 and 2019 for recognition of their work on living labs that, with the test of time, has had the greatest impact on the research community.

=== The 15-minute City ===
Kent Larson was an early proponent of compact, walkable communities, which later became known as the 15-minute city concept for promoting sustainable living and improved quality of life. In a 2012 TED talk, Larson discussed how cities in future can evolve into a high-performance network of 20-minute communities by deploying design, technology, and public policy innovation.

== Personal life ==
Larson lives in Jamaica Plain, Boston, with his wife, Maria Miller Larson.
