= Mitchell Joachim =

American architect

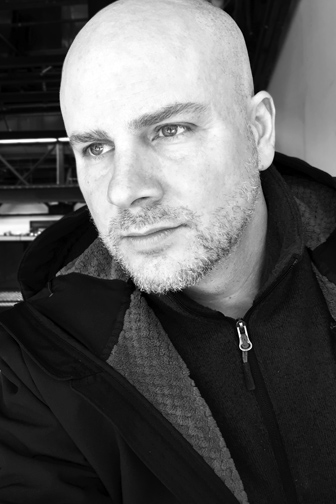
- Dr. Joachim in 2017
- Born: February 3, 1972 (age 54); New Jersey, United States
- Education: MIT, Harvard Graduate School of Design, Columbia University
- Known for: Fab Tree Hab, Sustainable design, MIT Car
- Scientific career
- Fields: Urban design, Architecture
- Workplaces: Terreform ONE + NYU
- Thesis: Ecotransology: Integrated Design for Urban Mobility (2006)
- Doctoral advisor: William J. Mitchell
- Other academic advisors: Alex Krieger, Adèle Naudé Santos

Mitchell Joachim (pronounced /jo-ak-um/; born February 3, 1972) is an architect and urban designer. He is the Co-Founder of Terreform ONE, and a Professor of Practice at NYU. Previously he was the Frank Gehry Chair at University of Toronto and a faculty member at Pratt, Columbia, Syracuse, Washington, The New School, and the European Graduate School.

Most of Joachim's projects employ innovative platforms and methods based on living biological matter for fabrication and design purposes. Rather than merely drawing inspiration from nature (not biomimicry), these materials are altered, coaxed, or engineered to function in ways that stay living and breathing within the environment.

== Early life and education ==
Mitchell Joachim was born in New Jersey to Henry and Ellen Joachim. Henry, a passionate painter, owned a small wood furniture manufacturing business. Ellen, Mitchell’s mother, played a pivotal role in his upbringing, guiding him alongside Henry. In the late '70s, seeking a better quality of life, his parents moved from Manhattan to the suburbs of New Jersey. This relocation blended the cultural richness of their New York City heritage with suburban stability, shaping Mitchell's development and nurturing his passions and interests under the guidance of his parents’ entrepreneurial spirit and artistic inclination.

He earned a Ph.D. at Massachusetts Institute of Technology, in the Dept. of Architecture, Design and Computation program , a Master of Architecture in Urban Design (MAUD) at Harvard Graduate School of Design (GSD), a M.Arch at Columbia University GSAPP, and a BPS at the University at Buffalo, The State University of New York with Honors.

== Awards and recognition ==
Mitchell has been awarded a Fulbright Scholarship, LafargeHolcim Foundation Award, ARCHITECT R+D Award, Senior Fellowship at TED 2011, Moshe Safdie and Assoc. Fellowship, and Martin Society for Sustainability Fellowship at MIT. He won the Zumtobel Group Award, History Channel and Infiniti Design Excellence Award for the City of the Future, and Time Magazine Best Invention of the Year 2007, MIT Car w/ MIT Smart Cities. His project, Fab Tree Hab, has been exhibited at MoMA and widely published. He was selected by Wired magazine for "The 2008 Smart List: 15 People the Next President Should Listen To". Rolling Stone magazine honored Mitchell as an agent of change in "The 100 People Who Are Changing America". In 2009 he was interviewed on the Colbert Report Popular Science magazine has featured his work as a visionary for “The Future of the Environment” in 2010. Mitchell was the Winner of the Victor Papanek Social Design Award sponsored by the University of Applied Arts Vienna, the Austrian Cultural Forum New York, and the Museum of Arts and Design in 2011. Dwell magazine featured Mitchell as one of "The NOW 99" in 2012. He won the American Institute of Architects New York, Urban Design Merit Award for; Terreform ONE, Urbaneer Resilient Waterfront Infrastructure, 2013.

== Career ==
Early in his career, Joachim worked for Pei Cobb Freed & Partners Architects. Working with I.M. Pei provided Joachim with valuable insights into large-scale architectural projects and the integration of contemporary design with historical contexts. His experience allowed him to develop a deep understanding of architectural form, materiality, and the importance of place in urban design.

Years later, Joachim worked at the architecture offices of Mohse Safdie under an awarded research fellowship. Safdie contributed to his ability to push the boundaries of traditional architecture, incorporating analytical tools and socio-ecological principles into designs of tall buildings and clusters.

The mentorship and collaboration with these two renowned architects provided Joachim with a strong foundation for his career, leading to his recognition in ecological design and sustainable urbanism. Joachim's exposure to Pei's modernist precision and Safdie's humane principles influenced his own innovative projects, such as the Fab Tree Hab, Cricket Shelter, and Monarch Sanctuary. These experiences reinforced his commitment to creating architecture that is not only visually striking but also environmentally responsible and socially inclusive.

In 2002, Joachim started his doctoral research with the MIT Media Lab's Smart Cities group under the leadership of William J. Mitchell. This experience allowed him to explore the intersection of computational design and urbanism, focusing on how emerging types of mobility, city cars, and soft vehicles could be leveraged to create more sustainable transport-based municipal environments.

After MIT, Joachim completed his part of the project on the Frank Gehry Car with General Motors to work in the offices of Frank O. Gehry and Partners in Los Angeles.

=== Terreform ONE ===
In 2006, Mitchell Joachim co-founded Terreform ONE (Open Network Ecology), a 501c3 nonprofit organization that focuses on biotech architecture and ecological urban planning. Terreform ONE aims to address environmental issues of climate change and biodiversity loss through novel experimental methodologies, engineered living materials, and interdisciplinary research. Their operational motto is to "Design Against Extinction".

== Design projects ==
- Fab Tree Hab
- MIT Car
- Cricket Shelter and Modular Edible Insect Farm
- Rapid Re(f)use
- Urbaneering Brooklyn: City of the Future
- SOFT XO Lamb Car
- Green Brain: Smart Park for a New City
- New York 2106: Self-Sufficient City
- Jetpack Packing and Blimp Bumper Bus

== Selected publications ==
- Mitchell Joachim, Maria Aiolova, and Terreform ONE. Design with Life: Biotech Architecture and Resilient Cities, Actar, 2019.
- Mitchell Joachim, Mike Silver. XXL-XS: New Directions in Ecological Design, Actar, 2017.
- Anker, Peder, Harpman, Louise, and Mitchell Joachim. Global Design: Elsewhere Envisioned, Prestel/ Random House, 2014.
- Tandon, Nina and Mitchell Joachim. Super Cells: Building with Biology. TED Books, 2014.
- Lasky, Julie, The Beauty of Bacteria, The New York Times, pp. D1, D7, Thur. Jan. 17, 2013.
- Myers, William (ed.), Bio Design: Nature + Science + Creativity, Thames & Hudson, The Museum of Modern Art, pp. 10, 58–61. 2012.
- Bergman, David, Sustainable Design: A Critical Guide, Princeton Architectural Press, p 135. 2012.
- Bua, Matt and Maximillian Goldfarb (ed.), Architectural Inventions: Visionary Drawings, Laurence King Publishing, pp. 20, 72, 144, 318. 2012.
- Amoroso, Nadia, Digital Landscape Architecture Now, Thames & Hudson. pp. 17, 242–247. 2012.
- Budds, Diana, “The Now 99, The Future of Housing,” Dwell, May, p. 102, 120. 2012.
- Mitchell Joachim, "The Necessity of All Scales: Planetary Design in the Age of Globality," Ecological Urban Architecture, Thomas Schroepfer (ed.), Birkhäuser, pp. 174–184. 2012.
- Mitchell Joachim, "Envisioning Ecological Cities; Rapid Re(f)use, One Hour Tower, Homeway," Sustainable Urbanism and Beyond: Rethinking Cities for the Future, Tigran Haas (ed.), Rizzoli, pp. 240–245. 2012.
- Mitchell Joachim and Maria Aiolova, “Design as a Resource for All Recourses,” Futuristic: Visions of Future Living, Caroline Klein, Prof. Dr. Stefanie Lieb (ed.), DAAB, pp. 242–249. 2012.
- Mitchell Joachim, "The Art of Cities," City Vision, Francesco Lipari, Federico Giacomarra (ed.), issue #7, autumn/winter, pp. 64–71. 2012.
- Mitchell Joachim, “Envisioning Ecological Cities,” Ecological Urbanism, Mohsen Mostafavi and Gareth Doherty (ed.), pp. 224–29, Harvard University GSD, Lars Muller Publishers, 2010.
- John Bradley, "Future of The Environment: The Urban Remodeler," Popular Science, pp. cover, 7, 46–47, July 2010.
- Mitchell Joachim, “Agora: Dreams and Visions,” l’Arca, pp. 4– 11, N° 246, April, 2009.
- Mitchell Joachim, “Housing for the 21st Century; Urban Refuse, Housing & Wall-E,” eVolo magazine, pp. 62–63, issue 01, Fall, 2009.
- Maywa Montenegro, “The Seed Salon: Thomas Lovejoy & Mitchell Joachim,” Seed, pp. 39–44, issue #22, June, 2009.
- Matt Pascarella, “Philippe Starck & Mitchell Joachim; Designs for Violence, Ecology, Religion & Politics”, TAR, pp. 198–209, Issue 2, Spring, 2009.
- “The RS 100: Agents of Change,” Rolling Stone, p. 63, April 2, 2009.
- Tom Vanderbilt, “The 2008 Smart List: Mitchell Joachim, Redesign Cities from Scratch,” Wired, pp. 178–9, 16.10, Oct, 2008.
- Michelle Galindo (ed.), 1000X Architecture of the Americas, Verlagshaus Braun, p. 429, 2008.
- Tim Groen, Relax – Interiors for Human Wellness, p. 250-3, Birkhäuser, 2007.
- Linda Stern, “Terreform: Building Houses Out of Living Trees,” Newsweek, p. E2, May 28, 2007.
- Craig Kellogg, “Tree/House,” Interior Design, p. 48, Vol. 78, issue #1, Jan. 1, 2007.
- Axel Ritter, Smart Materials: Types, Products, Architecture, pp. 10–11, 142, 160, Birkhäuser, 2006.
- Richard Burdett, Cities: Architecture and Society 10, Internazional Di Architettura, International Architectural Exhibition, V.1-2, p. 301, 2006.
- Robin Pogrebin, “Visions of Manhattan: For the City, 100-Year Makeovers,” The New York Times, p. A9, Nov. 4, 2006.
- Gregory Mone, “Grow Your Second Home,” Popular Science, pp. 38–9, Nov, 2006.
- Geeta Dayal, “A Sheep at the Wheel,” Intersection, Issue 03, p. 78-79, 2006.
- Mitchell Joachim, Javier Arbona, Lara Greden, “Nature's Home,” 306090 08: Autonomous Urbanism, Kjersti Monson & Alex Duval, ed., NY: Princeton Architectural Press, 2005.
- David J. Brown, The HOME House Project: The Future of Affordable Housing, MIT Press, 2005.
- Phil Patton, “At M.I.T., Rethinking the Car for City Life,” The New York Times, p. D9, Sep. 6, 2004.
- Catherine Fox, “How Harvard would remake Atlanta,” Atlanta Journal-Constitution, Jun. 3, 2001.

== See also ==
- Pleaching
- Terreform ONE
