= Nissan Actic =

Overview
- Manufacturer: Nissan
- Production: 2004

Body and chassis
- Class: Concept car
- Body style: 4-door SUV
- Layout: Front engine, all-wheel drive

The Nissan Actic was a concept car design study by Nissan Design America in La Jolla, California, and presented at the 2004 North American International Auto Show. The vehicle itself is a crossover SUV style, with smooth, bullet-shaped bodywork that looks vaguely like a small Nissan Murano.

It was never intended for production, but instead served as an exercise to display future possible technologies and design directions for Nissan vehicles, and to gauge interest in a small, entry-level SUV. One of its most original features are sliding doors, instead of traditional hinged doors. The rear doors slide to the back of the vehicle and the front doors slide to the front of the car like elevator doors, allowing a maximum amount of entry space.

== See also ==
- Nissan Pivo
- Nissan Terranaut
