= RoboScooter =

The RoboScooter is a foldable electric scooter developed by William J. Mitchell of the Smart Cities program at the MIT Media Lab. The vehicle was designed in conjunction with Taiwan's SYM Motors and the Industrial Technology Research Institute.

The scooter is designed to use battery-powered electric motors in the wheels, with lithium-ion batteries that can be charged on special charging racks, by plugging in at home or by swapping batteries at special vending machines designed for this purpose. The scooter was designed to fold into a compact format, limiting the amount of parking or storage space needed, though a non-folding version could also be produced. The fold-up design would allow the scooter to be parked in 80% less space than traditional models. Like the MIT Car and GreenWheel, RoboScooter was developed by the MIT Media Lab Smart Cities program as a means to provide effective transportation within the world's cities, in a cost-effective and energy efficient manner. Using the bicycle rental systems that have been implemented in Europe, a shopper might rent a scooter to drive to the supermarket to do their shopping, then rent a vehicle like the MIT Car to return home with a car laden with groceries.

The RoboScooter was designed to have similar performance characteristics as gasoline-powered models with 50cc displacement engines. In the past, hybrid vehicles have required as much as 25% more parts than their internal combustion engine-powered counterparts. The legacy vehicles typically have 1,000 to 1,500 components, while the RoboScooter is designed to be made with 150 parts, reducing supply chain issues, making construction easier and faster, and simplifying repairs, all in a vehicle that can be manufactured at a reduced cost compared to comparable traditional vehicles. A "show-quality" model of the RoboScooter was displayed in November 2007 at the Milan motorcycle show. MIT Media Lab staff estimated that the RoboScooter would weigh in at 85 pounds (39 kg), compared to the 265 pounds (120 kg) of a traditional gasoline-powered scooter loaded with a full tank of gasoline.

== See also ==
- MIT Car
- GreenWheel
