= Terreform ONE =

US-based non-profit organization

- Company type: Non-profit organization
- Industry: Architecture, Urban Design, Non Profit
- Founded: 2006
- Headquarters: Brooklyn, New York
- Key people: Mitchell Joachim and Maria Aiolova, Co-Founders. Vivian Kuan, Special Advisor, and Mark Chambers, Executive Director
- Number of employees: 14
- Website: www.terreform.org www.terreform.com

Terreform ONE is a national 501(c)(3) non-profit architecture and urbanism group that advances ecological design in derelict municipal areas. By formulating unsolicited feasibility studies and egalitarian proposals, their mission is to illustrate speculative environmental plans for cities worldwide. Their intention is to support community outreach and master plan solutions in underprivileged areas that do not have direct access to qualified architects and urban designers.

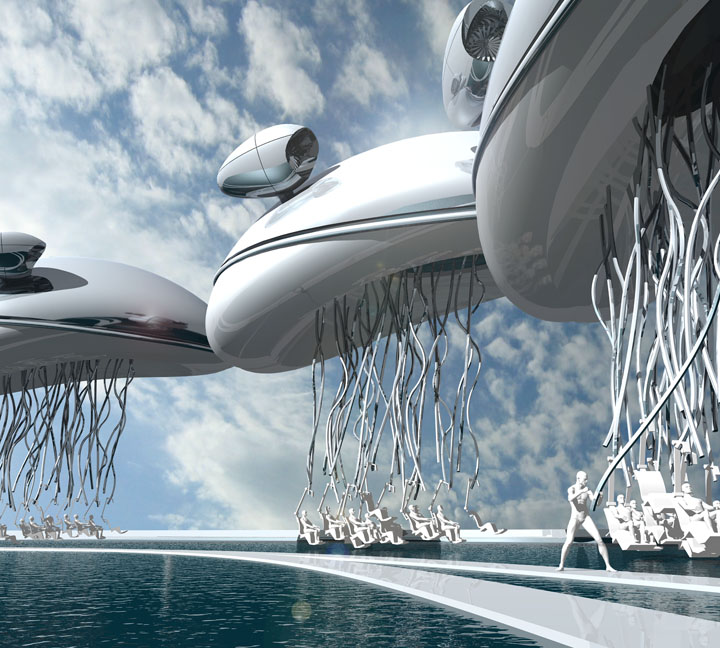
Terreform one project blimp bus

They are a pro bono studio and lab for adept architects, planners, scientists, and urban studies specialists to investigate and refine the broader framework of ecological city design. The organization strives to inspire unique solutions for global sustainability in the following categories; air quality, smart mobility, renewable power, infrastructure, food access, recycling waste processes, clean water, and equitable economies. The group seeks to encourage public appreciation for the numerous methods in which architecture and urbanism improves human life.

== History ==
The organization was co-founded in May 2006 by Mitchell Joachim, Maria Aiolova and others in response to the need for urgent long-standing research on sustainable cities. After entering a series of open design competitions the organization then began taking on a number of urban projects, engaging local neighborhoods with members of the design community to broaden a ground up alternative to overdevelopment. Mark Chambers has succeeded Vivian Kuan, who served with distinction for eleven years as executive director.

== Activity ==
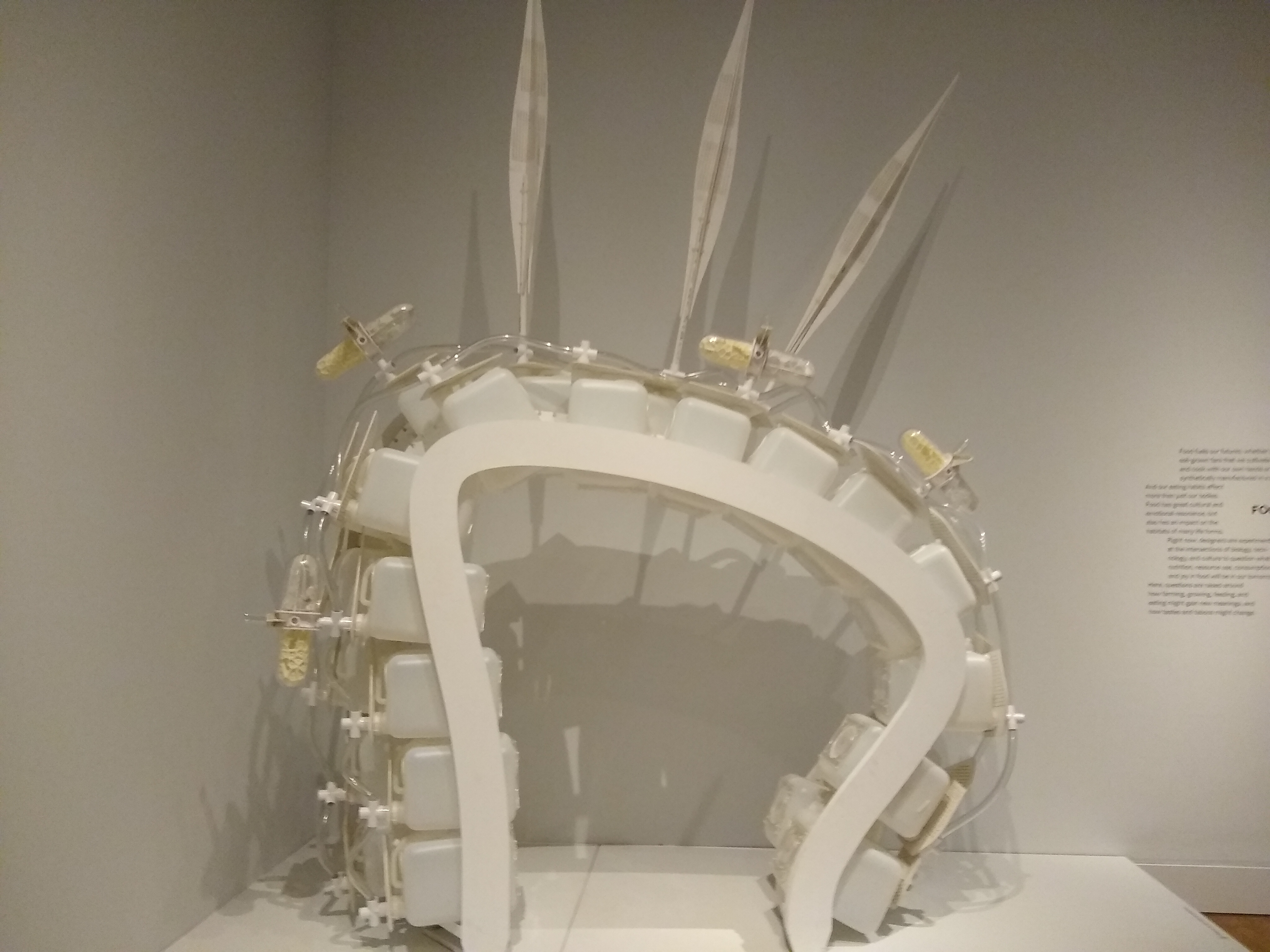
Cricket Shelter Modular Edible Insect Farm, designed by Terreform ONE

To further the humanitarian aim of Terrform ONE's directives, the group began offering the ONE Prize, a public design and science award focused on green urbanity. Over the years the jury has included some of the most notable figures in urban pedagogy and practice: NYC Planning Commissioner Amanda Burden, Parks Commissioner Adrian Benepe, Michael Colgrove, Helena Durst, Bjarke Ingels, Kate Ascher, James Corner, Carol Coletta, William J. Mitchell, Margaret Crawford, Cameron Sinclair, among others.

ONE Lab and TerreFarm are two educational components of Terreform ONE. These collaborative schools receive forty students each year from around the world to learn about topics including synthetic biology, urban farming, parametric computation, ecological landscapes, rapid prototyping, and urban theory. A public lecture series occurs during the seminars, with notable designers Vito Acconci, Dickson Despommier, Natalie Jeremijenko, and Christian Hubert.

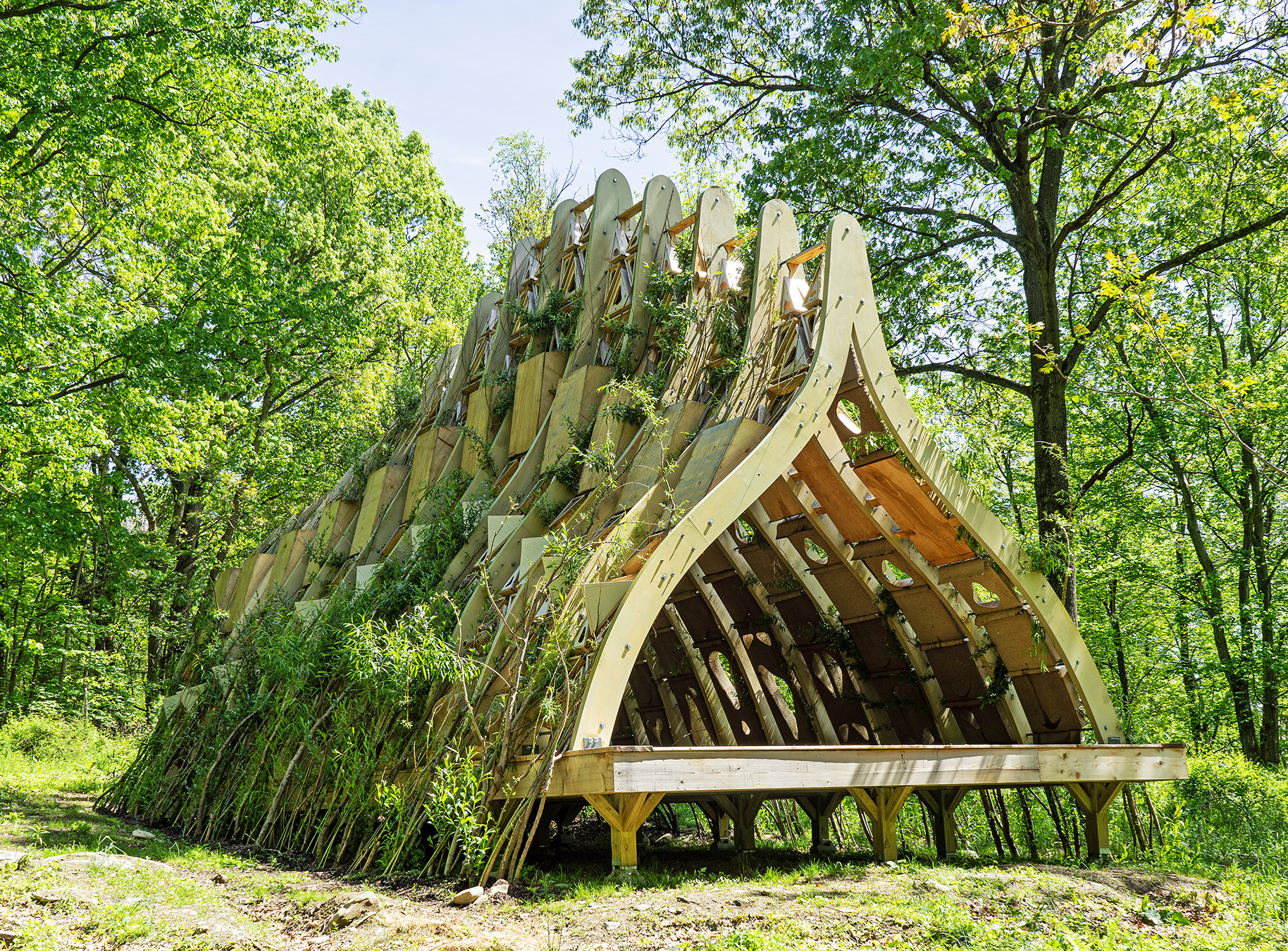
Fab Tree Hab

Terreform ONE has been officially selected to participate in the Venice Biennale of Architecture.

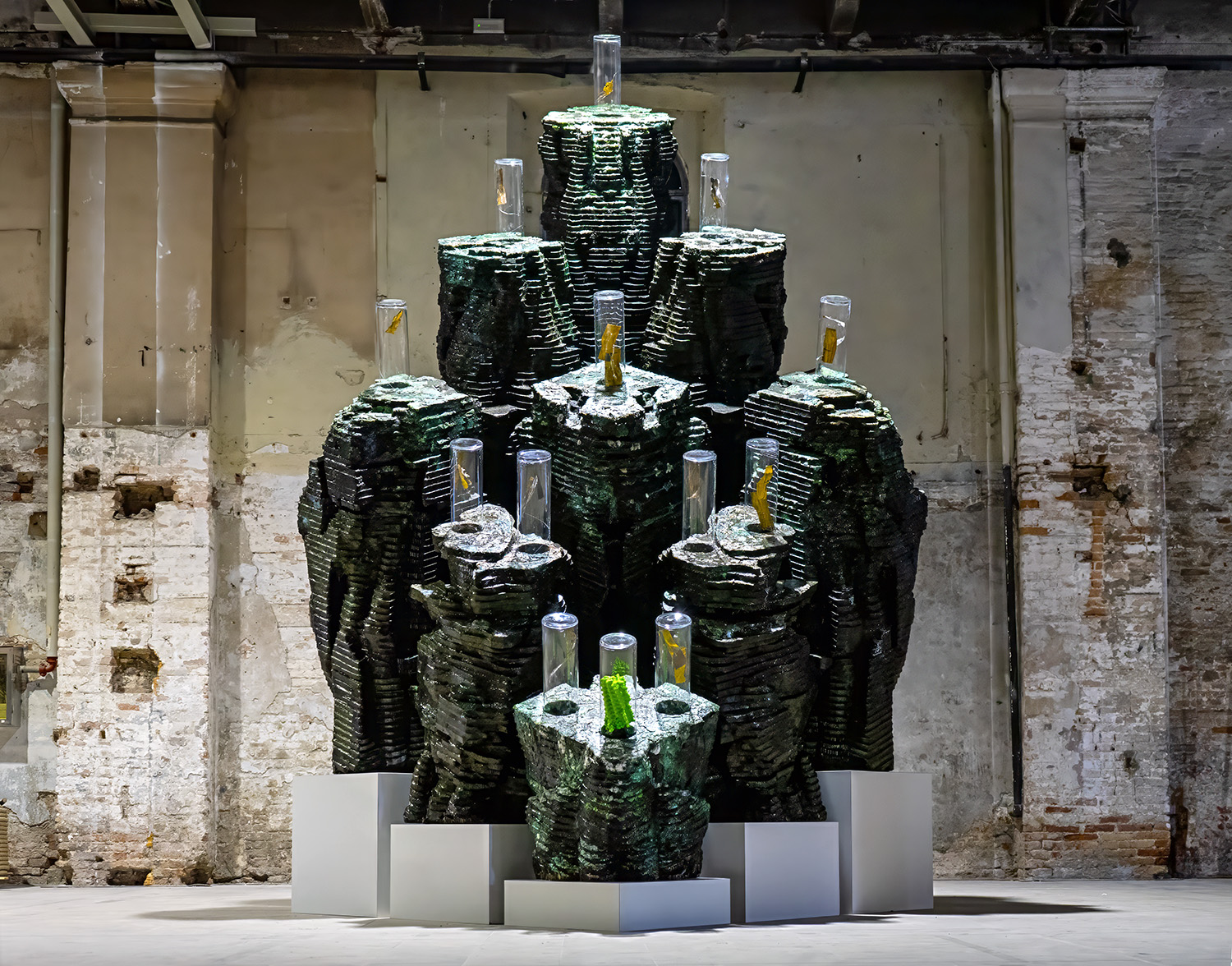
Coding Plants

== Structure ==
With multiple chapters and constituents in various countries around the globe, they are structured into five divisions under the parent organization Terre ONE (Open Network Ecology) as follows; Terreform ONE – Architectural and Urban Research Hub, Terreform ONE Lab - School for Design and Science, Terreform ONE Prize – Annual Juried Competition, Terreform ONE Global – International Fellowship Program, Terreform ONE Event - Host for City Experience Venues.

== Recognition ==
They are the winners of ARCHITECT R+D Awards, and the Victor Papanek Social Design Award sponsored by the University of Applied Arts Vienna, the Austrian Cultural Forum New York, and the Museum of Arts and Design. Terreform ONE is equally honored with the Zumtobel Group Award for Sustainability and Humanity for the project, New York City Resource & Mobility. Terreform was also a recipient of the Infiniti Design Excellence Award for the History Channel City of the Future competition. They have earned a Bronze Medal from iGEM (International Genetically Engineered Machine) for the Gen2Seat fully organic chair product. In 2013, Terreform ONE were winners of the AIA New York Urban Design Merit Award for their Urbaneer: Resilient Waterfront Infrastructure work. The group also received an Architizer A+ Award for the Bio City World Map of 11 Billion.

== Urban projects ==
- Urbaneering Brooklyn
- Homeway: The Great Suburban Exodus
- Fab Tree Hab
- Rapid Re(f)use
- SOFT Lamb Car
- Green Brain: Smart Park for a New City
- New York 2106: Self-Sufficient City
- Jetpack Packing and Blimp Bumper Bus
- In Vitro Meat Habitat.

== Comparable organizations ==
Similar groups include; The Forum for Urban Design, Architecture for Humanity, Project for Public Spaces, The Center for Urban Pedagogy, Storefront for Art and Architecture, Institute for Architecture and Urban Studies, and Rocky Mountain Institute.

== See also ==
- 3D printer – Additive process used to make a 3D object
