= GreenWheel =

Modular electronic assist device for bicycles

The GreenWheel is a modular electronic assist device for bicycles that fits inside the wheel of any standard bicycle and provides additional power above and beyond the power provided by the person pedaling.

Developed by William J. Mitchell and other team members at the Smart Cities project at the MIT Media Lab, the GreenWheel puts the motor and its batteries inside a housing that fits into the bicycle's wheel hub. The user can control the amount of additional boost provided using a wireless controller attached to the handlebars. The device can provide 50 miles (80 km) of travel distance, adding power as needed to help on hills and to travel longer distances or while accelerating. The battery can be recharged overnight at the cost of about one dollar of electricity, and recharges itself while braking and traveling downhill using regenerative braking. Power would be provided when the rider exceeds a preset pedaling pace and would stop when the rider stopped pedaling. GreenWheel could be easily retrofitted to existing bicycles or designed as a component of new models. The MIT Media Lab noted that the product would enable bicycle use for residents of hilly and hot cities, where it is not now practical.

A prototype of the GreenWheel design was created and demonstrated in October 2008. The GreenWheel would add little weight to a bicycle and could be present on bicycles sold for less than $1,000, a small fraction of the weight and cost of a standard electric vehicle. The original design of the GreenWheel requires that the original spokes on the bicycle wheel be replaced with shorter spokes. The team estimated that the device would last for about 40,000 miles (64,000 km), about eight years of use if driven 20 miles (32 km) each day.

== See also ==
- MIT Car
- RoboScooter
