= Renault Zoom =

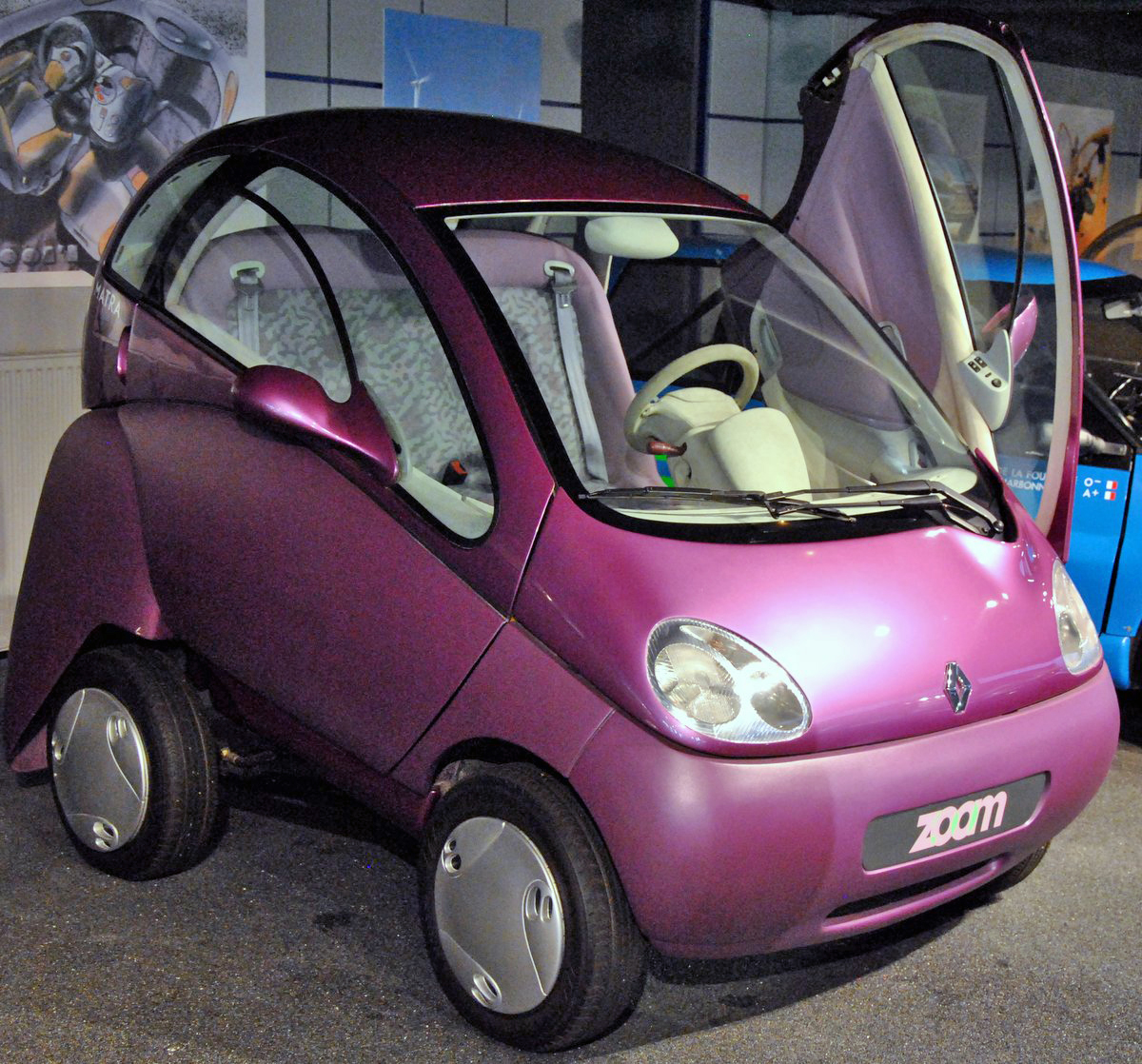
- Zoom in retracted state

Overview
- Manufacturer: Renault and Matra
- Production: 1992

Body and chassis
- Class: Concept car
- Body style: 3-door hatchback
- Layout: Front-engine, front-wheel-drive
- Doors: Scissor

Powertrain
- Engine: 25 kW (34 bhp) Electric motor
- Transmission: CVT
- Range: 150 km (93 miles)

Dimensions
- Length: 2,650 mm (104.3 in) (2,300 mm (90.6 in)) (retracted)
- Width: 1,520 mm (59.8 in)

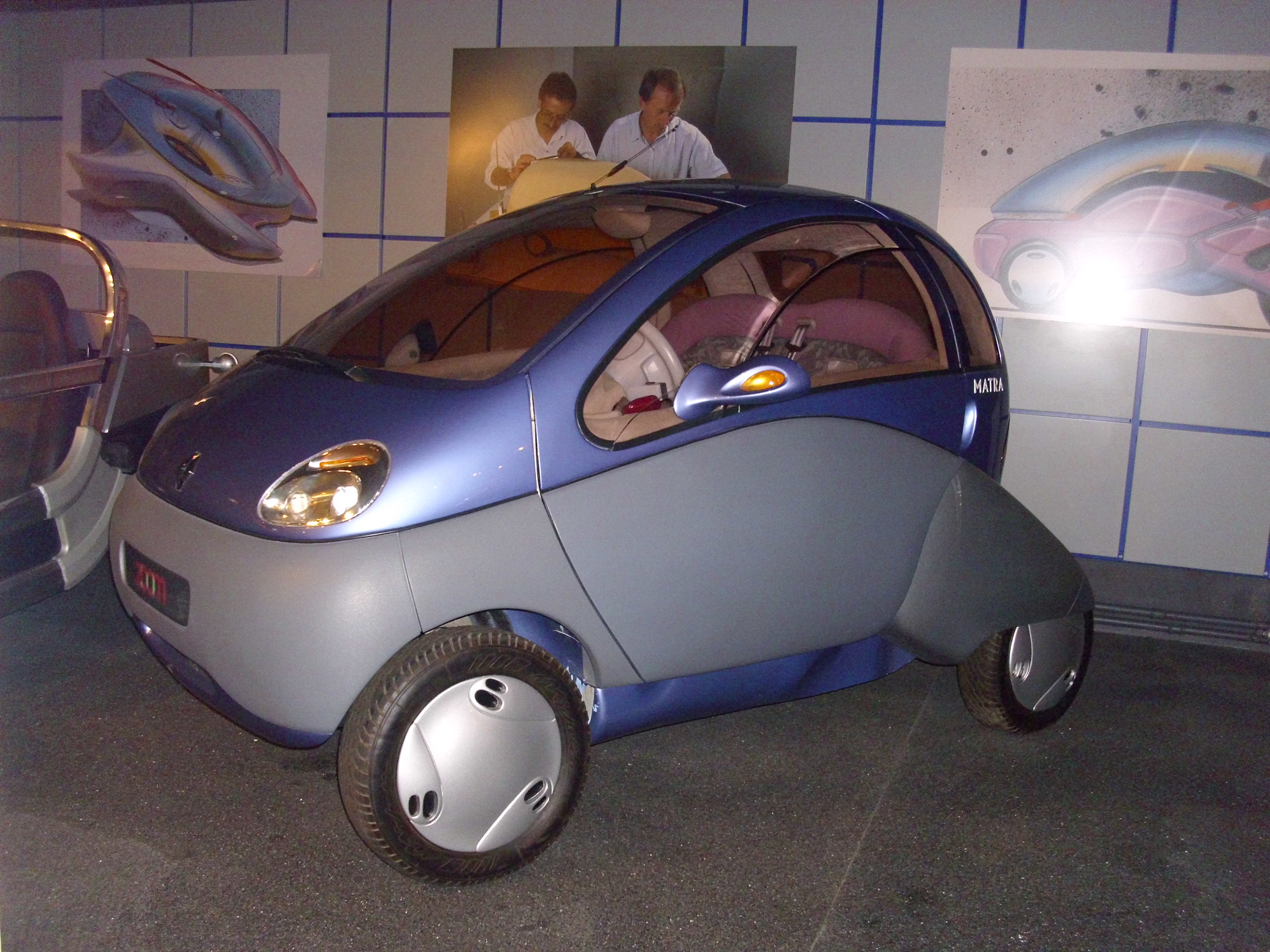
Renault Zoom

The Renault Zoom was an electric concept car created by Renault and Matra was first introduced at the 1992 Paris Motor Show.

The small 2-seat car had a length of 2,650 mm (104.3 in) and a width of 1,520 mm (59.8 in). The Zoom was powered by a 45 kW (61.2 hp) electric motor. It was unique in having fold up rear wheels resulting in a shorter length 2,300 mm (90.6 in) when parked. Width remains constant at 1.52m, which means Zoom is 230 mm (9.1 in) higher in retracted wheelbase configuration. 2 scissor doors mounted on inclined axes reduce lateral bodywork clearance to a minimum and make Zoom easy to use in the tightest of spots.

The Zoom was an urban and suburban concept car born of common research by Renault and Matra into modern electric cars. The Zoom was a relatively early venture into the world of city runabouts and utilised an electric power system in addition to a variable wheelbase. The engine is 90 percent recyclable. A communication centre mounted between the two seats houses a hands-free telephone and power-up control for Carminat navigation system.

The concept for a variable wheelbase city car was revisited by the MIT CityCar and applied in the development of the Hiriko folding two-seat urban electric car. It did not go into production due to it being a concept but also the infrastructure of the electric vehicles.
