= Platform ecosystem =

Many markets are structured as platform ecosystems, they can be open or closed platforms, where a stable core (such as a smartphone operating system or a music streaming service) mediates the relationship between a wide range of complements (like apps, games or songs) and prospective end-users.

== Overview ==
The word "ecosystem" comes from biology and is a contraction of "ecological system"; it refers to a system in which entities have some degree of mutual dependence. In a platform ecosystem, the value created by each member influences the value created by others. Because a robust and high-quality ecosystem of complements attracts more customers, complements need each other even though they might also be competing against each other.

A platform's boundaries can be well-defined with a stable set of members dedicated wholly to that platform, or they can be amorphous and changing, with members entering and exiting freely, and participating in multiple platforms simultaneously. For example, consider the difference between the television/movie streaming services HBO on Demand and Amazon Prime. HBO on Demand exists to serve only HBO content up to consumers. The shows available are tightly controlled, and there is limited entry and exit of show producers. The Amazon Prime ecosystem is much more open. In fact, just about any content producer – including individual independent filmmakers – can make their content available on Amazon Prime.

In many platform ecosystems, there are switching costs that make it difficult or costly to change ecosystems. Platforms and their complements often invest in co-specialization or sign exclusivity agreements that bind them into stickier, longer-term relationships than the market contracts used in typical reseller arrangements. A video game that has been made for the Microsoft Xbox, for example, can only be played on a PlayStation console unless a new version of it is made (and the game producer may have signed a contract with Microsoft that prohibits this). A platform ecosystem is thus characterized by relationships that are neither as independent as arms-length market contracts, nor as dependent as those within a hierarchical organization. It is, in essence, a hybrid organizational form. It strikes a compromise between the loose coupling of a purely modular system and the tight coupling of a traditional integrated product. It enables customers to mix and match some components and complements, while still enabling some co-specialization and curation of the complements and components available for the system. In ecosystems, gaining the support and approval of the other members and legitimacy matters, as the very concept of an ecosystem is based on the idea that every organism is interdependent on other organisms within the system and gaining acceptance from powerful actors is therefore crucial.

== Example ==
Video game systems are an iconic example of platform ecosystems. Consoles need to launch with high-quality games. Since it is difficult to induce game developers to make games for a console that has not yet been widely adopted, most game console producers must produce games themselves (or subsidize their production) to ensure that high-quality games are available when the console launches. On the other hand, end users want more games than just those produced by the console producer, so console producers like Microsoft, Sony, and Nintendo also license third-party developers to produce games for their consoles. They carefully screen the licensed games for quality and compatibility, and they may require the game developers to sign exclusivity agreements or to customize the games for the console.

== Platform ecosystem as parallel conversations ==
Platform, ecosystem, and particularly "platform ecosystem" is a disputed term in information systems, organizational management, and technology and innovation research Jochem Hummel said on 21 February 2020 in a lecture of the Digital Business Strategy postgraduate module at Warwick Business School. "Different researchers mean different things when referring to platform ecosystems," Jochem said, "creating parallel conversations." Similar comments were raised by Melissa Schilling on 30 November 2017 in a symposium titled 'A Multi-Disciplinary Perspective on Platform Ecosystems Research.' Melissa argued that almost every website was nowadays called a platform, with an ecosystem where users could choose between buying products or services from different vendors. "Does this mean McDonalds is a platform ecosystem?", she asked the other panelists. Since 2017, the consensus has emerged among scholars that platforms ecosystems typically require the involvement of in some way or another digital technology. This may have triggered the term to become less popular as scholars started using the term 'digital platform' or 'digital platform ecosystems' instead popularized through, for example, the 2018 'Special Issue: Digital Infrastructure and Platforms' in Information Systems Research.

== Digital platform ecosystem ==
The emergence of digital platform ecosystems, which are dominating the market, has been made possible by the hybridization of digital technologies. These platforms are a combination of products, services, and digital technologies developed by one or more companies, forming a technological foundation on which other companies can build complementary products and services, generating network effects. The "Big Five" companies, including Facebook, Apple, Microsoft, Google, and Amazon, are prime examples of digital platform ecosystems. The concept of a digital platform is closely related to that of an ecosystem, referring to the population of actors that collaborate with the platform sponsor to co-create value. From a systemic dimension, it is possible to identify four categories of actors characterizing the digital platform ecosystem: the platform sponsor, the platform provider, complementors (supply-side) and users (demand-side)

The sponsor of a digital platform ecosystem is responsible for designing and owning the intellectual property rights of the platform. They establish the components, rules, and architecture of the platform. Apple, for instance, is the platform sponsor of its renowned Apple platform. The users of the platform are the consumers who use the services offered, while the content and application developers, known as complementors, are the supply-side users. Examples of such developers are WhatsApp Inc., Deliveroo, Uber, and Car2go, which provide items like music, games, and information. The platform provider, who is usually the platform sponsor, serves as the contact point for all users of the digital platform ecosystem, providing the platform's core technologies. The interactions among the actors in digital platform ecosystems result in co-created value through various digital algorithms, enabling the platform to quickly connect both sides of the market and facilitate complementary innovations.

Put it differently, the platform sponsor plays a critical role in designing digital platforms' algorithms, taking into account four essential factors from a structural perspective: shared standards, rules of participation, degree of openness, and direct and indirect network effects. Shared standards are the first critical element that offers clarity for how digital platform components interact. The second element is the rules of participation that are essential to make digital platform ecosystems work effectively. The third element is the degree of openness, which involves decisions on how much core technology to share with the complementors, which actors can participate in the platform, and the compatibility of the innovation platform with other complementary and substitutive digital platforms. Lastly, network effect dynamics imply that each additional user makes the platform more valuable to every other user on the same or the other side, known as same-side and cross-side network effects.

To understand the purpose of digital platforms, there are three distinct types of platforms: transaction platforms, innovation platforms, and hybrid platforms. Transaction platforms are designed to facilitate transactions and interactions within the market side, such as Twitter, Uber, Airbnb, Amazon Marketplace, Alibaba, and LinkedIn. On the other hand, innovation platforms provide a technological foundation for complementors to create new complementary innovations. Examples of innovation platforms are Xiaomi Miui, Apple iOS, Google Android, Nintendo, Sony PlayStation, and Amazon Web Services. Lastly, hybrid platforms combine both transaction and innovation functions, like Amazon, which offers a marketplace for transactions and web services for innovation.

== See also ==
- Product ecosystem theory
