= Hiriko =

Hiriko electric car
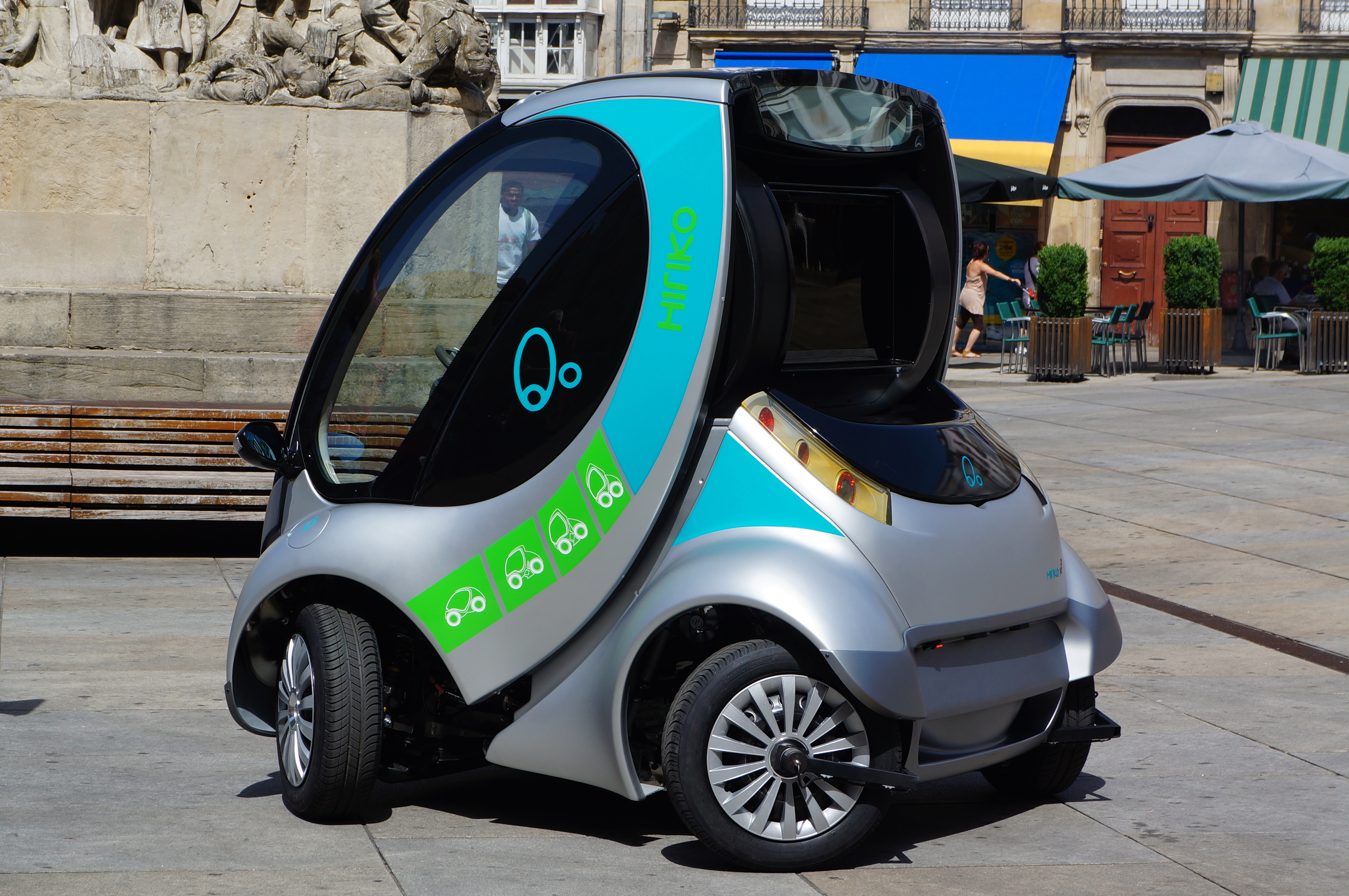
- Hiriko Fold pre-production model

Overview
- Manufacturer: Hiriko Driving Mobility
- Assembly: Vitoria-Gasteiz, Spain

Body and chassis
- Class: City car
- Related: CityCar

Powertrain
- Electric motor: 4 Wheel Hub Motors
- Battery: Li-ion
- Range: 120 km (75 mi)

Dimensions
- Length: maximum 2,500 mm (98.4 in)
- Kerb weight: 500 kg (1,100 lb)

The Hiriko is a folding two-seat urban electric car that was under development by the Hiriko Driving Mobility consortium in the Basque Country of northern Spain. The electric car was to be the commercial implementation of the CityCar project developed by the Massachusetts Institute of Technology Media Lab since 2003. The name Hiriko comes from the Basque word for "urban" or "from the city".

Three versions were to be developed: the Fold microcar; the Alai, a convertible; and the Laga, a small truck. The Hiriko was to be designed specifically for short-distance urban carsharing programs and municipal fleets. A manufacturing trial aiming for 20 pre-production cars began in Vitoria-Gasteiz, Spain, in July 2012. A pilot program was scheduled to take place in Germany in 2013 to integrate the Hiriko Fold into Deutsche Bahn's railway service to allow their customers the possibility of using a vehicle parked at the station with which to complete the last mile of the journey to their final destinations.

Production was planned for the second quarter of 2013 with retail deliveries initially scheduled to begin in 2014, at a price starting at €12,500 (US$16,400) plus battery leasing fees. In May 2013 the Hiriko consortium announced the project was having difficulties to continue with the commercial development phase due to lack of financing. Sixteen months after the January 2012 debut of the Hiriko the firm collapsed before the start of any production. Only one test vehicle and two semi finished ones were ever produced. In 2015 public prosecutors in Spain accused six businessmen involved in the project of fraud.

== History ==
The concept behind the Hiriko urban electric car was originally conceived by William J. Mitchell and his Smart Cities Research Group at the MIT Media Lab in 2003 as the MIT Car and later the CityCar project. Upon William Mitchell's death, the project was led by Kent Larson, director of the Changing Places Research Group. The commercial development of the Hiriko began in 2010 in the Science park of Alava, Basque Country, by the Spanish consortium Hiriko Driving Mobility in collaboration with the Changing Places Group and the Spanish government, which provided about €15 million (US$18.5 million) in financial support.

The Hiriko Driving Mobility consortium included seven Spanish companies under the promotion and leadership of the Association for the Development and Promotion of Industrial and Sport Activities from Alava (Afypaida), the Basque Center for Innovation Denokinn, and the Entrepreneurship and New Business Development Epsilon Euskadi.

A production prototype of the Hiriko Fold was formally unveiled by the President of the European Commission José Manuel Durão Barroso in January 2012.

The variable wheelbase concept used in the Hiriko was first introduced in the 1992 Renault Zoom concept car. The folding city car was invented in 1929 by Engelbert Zaschka, a three-wheeler with a single cylinder engine on the rear, which could be disassembled into three pieces.

== Specifications ==
The Hiriko car is a two-seat all-electric microcar designed to be used for short-distance urban trips intended for car sharing. The microcar is powered by a lithium-ion battery pack that allows a range of 120 km (75 mi). The drive motors are located inside each of the four wheels, and has an electronically controlled maximum speed of 50 km/h (31 mph). The consortium had plans to develop three versions: the Fold microcar, of which one demonstration car was completed; the Alai, a convertible; and the Laga, a small truck.

The Hiriko Fold weighs less than 500 kg (1,100 lb), has an extended length of 2.5 m (98.4 in) and its hinged body allow the microcar to retract its front and rear modules, enabling the Hiriko to fold upwards to 1.5 m (59.1 in) for parking. This feature allows three and a half Hiriko Folds to fit in a typical urban parking space. Each of the four wheels can turn 60 degrees left or right, enabling the car to travel sideways, which makes parallel parking a very easy maneuver to accomplish, and this flexibility allows the car to spin on its central axis. Furthermore, the battery pack is placed on the vehicle's floor producing a low center of gravity.

The driver and the passenger enter and exit the car through the front hatch that houses the windshield. The conventional steering wheel and the brake and throttle controls were replaced with a device similar to an airplane's yoke. When the driver pushes the control stick forward the car speeds up, while when pulled back the car slows down. Turns are made by moving the yoke control left or right.

== Demonstration projects ==
Production aiming for 20 test pre-production cars began in July 2012 in Vitoria-Gasteiz, Spain. These demonstration vehicles were supposed to be used for display and testing.

In December 2012, Hiriko and Deutsche Bahn announced an agreement to start a carsharing pilot program in Germany in 2013 to integrate the Hiriko Fold into Deutsche Bahn's railway service to allow their customers the possibility of using a vehicle parked at the station with which to complete the last mile of the journey to their final destinations. The electric car sharing system is called eFlinkster, and Deutsche Bahn operates several of such car sharing fleets. The agreement also included an initial phase in 2013 in which the Hiriko folding was to be tested and adapted for public use in Berlin, and an official and broader roll out was planned for 2014.

== Production and sales ==
The Hiriko Fold was unveiled in March 2013 at the Geneva Motor Show, and production was scheduled to begin during the second quarter of 2013. Retail deliveries were scheduled to begin in 2014. Pricing was to start at €12,500 (US$16,400) plus battery leasing fees. The consortium's plan was to sell the Hiriko to municipalities, including Barcelona, Berlin and San Francisco. The company also planned to promote the cars for cities across Europe to expand their carsharing programs. Among others, transport managers from the Basque biosphere reserve of Urdaibai, Ibiza, Hong Kong and Florianópolis in Brazil expressed interest in using the Hiriko in carsharing systems. In June 2013, the Hiriko was formally registered in the Brazilian national registry of intellectual property.

In May 2013 the Hiriko consortium announced that they were having difficulties to continue with the commercial development phase due to lack of financing. For the research and development phase, the consortium was granted €14.7 million (~ US$20 million) from the Minister of Industry, and additional €2.7 million (~ US$2.65 million) from the Basque Government. A government spokeswoman said that Hiriko had fulfilled its research objectives, for which they provided financial support. The government stated that financing for commercial development must come from the private sector and that the Basque Government was willing to continue participating with venture capital funds once the Hiriko obtained official industrial approval for production. The entire project was shut down and its participants laid off, some of whom were suing for severance pay and unpaid wages. The project's assets were frozen in 2015, and some former employees revealed that some parts of the car debuted in 2012 were glued with Velcro and superglue.

== See also ==
- Electric car use by country
- List of modern production plug-in electric vehicles
- Nissan Pivo
- Personal Urban Mobility and Accessibility (PUMA)
- Renault Twizy
- Axeon
- Folding Zaschka Three-wheeler
- Plug-in electric vehicle
- Suzuki Pixy and Q-Concept concept cars
