= Product ecosystem theory =

Product ecosystem theory is an emerging theory that describes how the design of manufactured products evolves over time and draws parallels with how species evolve within a natural ecosystem. Fundamental to this theory is that manufactured product lines respond to external threats and opportunities in much the same way that species respond to threats and opportunities. Competition and other environmental pressures may cause a species to become extinct. An example of the parallel in consumer products is the way in which the typewriter became displaced (or extinct) due to pressures from the personal computer. Product lines can be seen to incrementally change and branch over time following the principle of phyletic gradualism. Or they can be seen to have periods of stasis followed by disruptive innovation. This follows the principle of punctuated equilibrium.

Ecosystem Theory provides a conceptual framework that helps designers and others understand the mechanisms underpinning product innovation in a tangible and visual way.

Technology change is one of the environmental variables that provides both opportunity and threat for products in much the same way that environmental variables such as climate provide opportunity and threat for species. Evaluating designed products from this perspective is useful as it shows that the value of a product is not contained entirely within the product itself. Value is also obtained from the rest of the ecosystem.

== History and usage of the term ==
The term was first used in this context by Tim Williams in 2013 in a paper he wrote with Marianella Chamorro-Koc. This paper proposed a methodology for understanding the difficulties of implementation for disruptive innovation based on a case study of the MIT City Car. The term has been used non-specifically prior to this on a number of occasions.
