= Nissan Pivo =

Electric concept car by Nissan

The Nissan Pivo is a series of electric concept cars created by Nissan, with the first one introduced in 2005 at the Tokyo Motor Show.

== Pivo 1 ==
The Pivo is a concept car created by Nissan, first introduced at the 2005 Tokyo Motor Show. The car is essentially a 360 degree rotating three-seater cabin on a chassis of 4 wheels, eliminates the need for reversing and makes parking easier.

The Pivo is powered by a lithium-ion battery. The car's futuristic design incorporates large doors for easy access to the cabin and large windscreens and windows for high visibility. As well as the fully rotational cabin, the Pivo features Nissan's Around View Monitor system. This reduces blind spots (areas of the road which cannot be seen from the driver's position) by displaying the outside surroundings on screens mounted on the inside of the car's A-pillars, located on either side of the windshield.

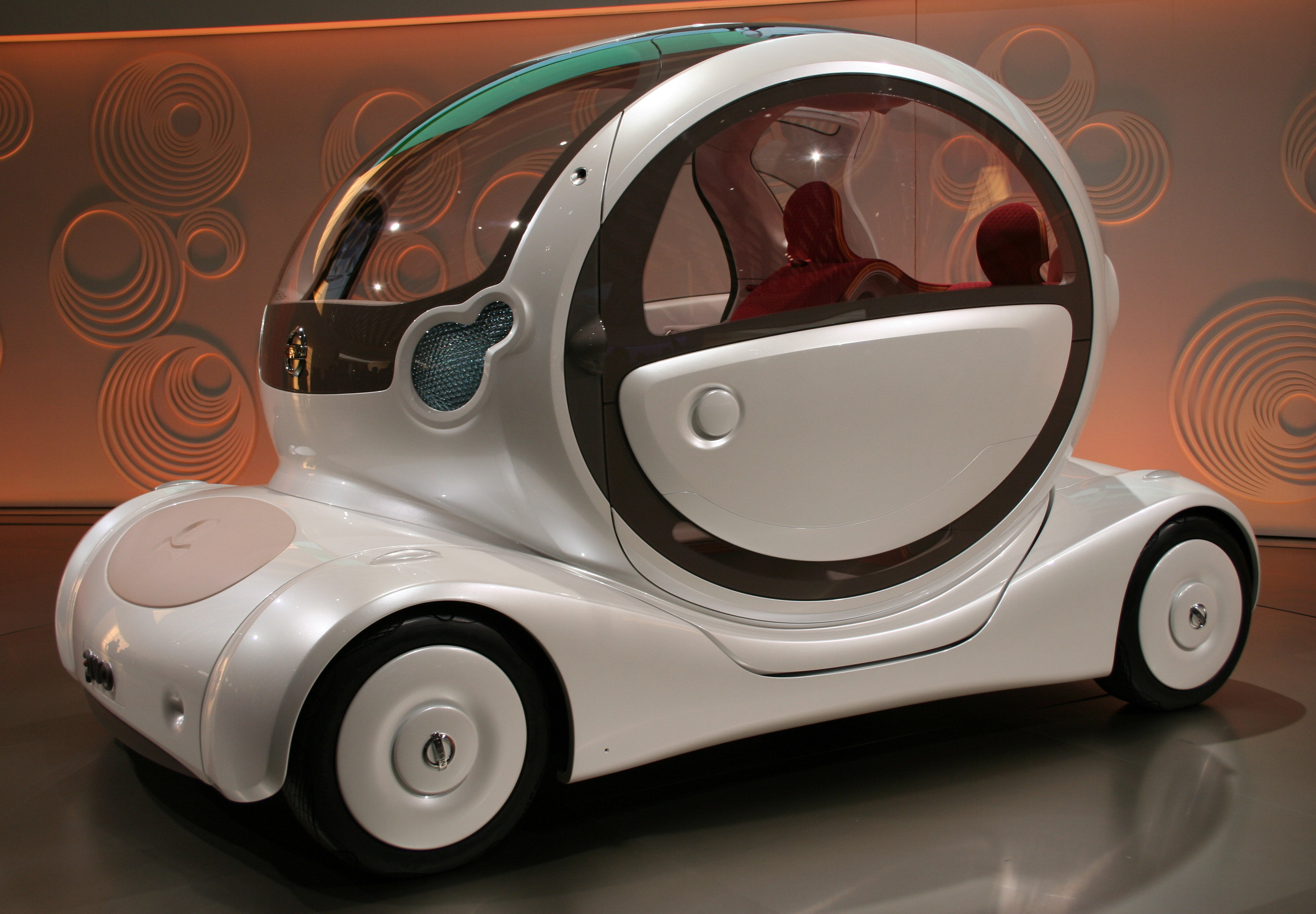
Original 2005 Nissan Pivo at the Tokyo Motor Show

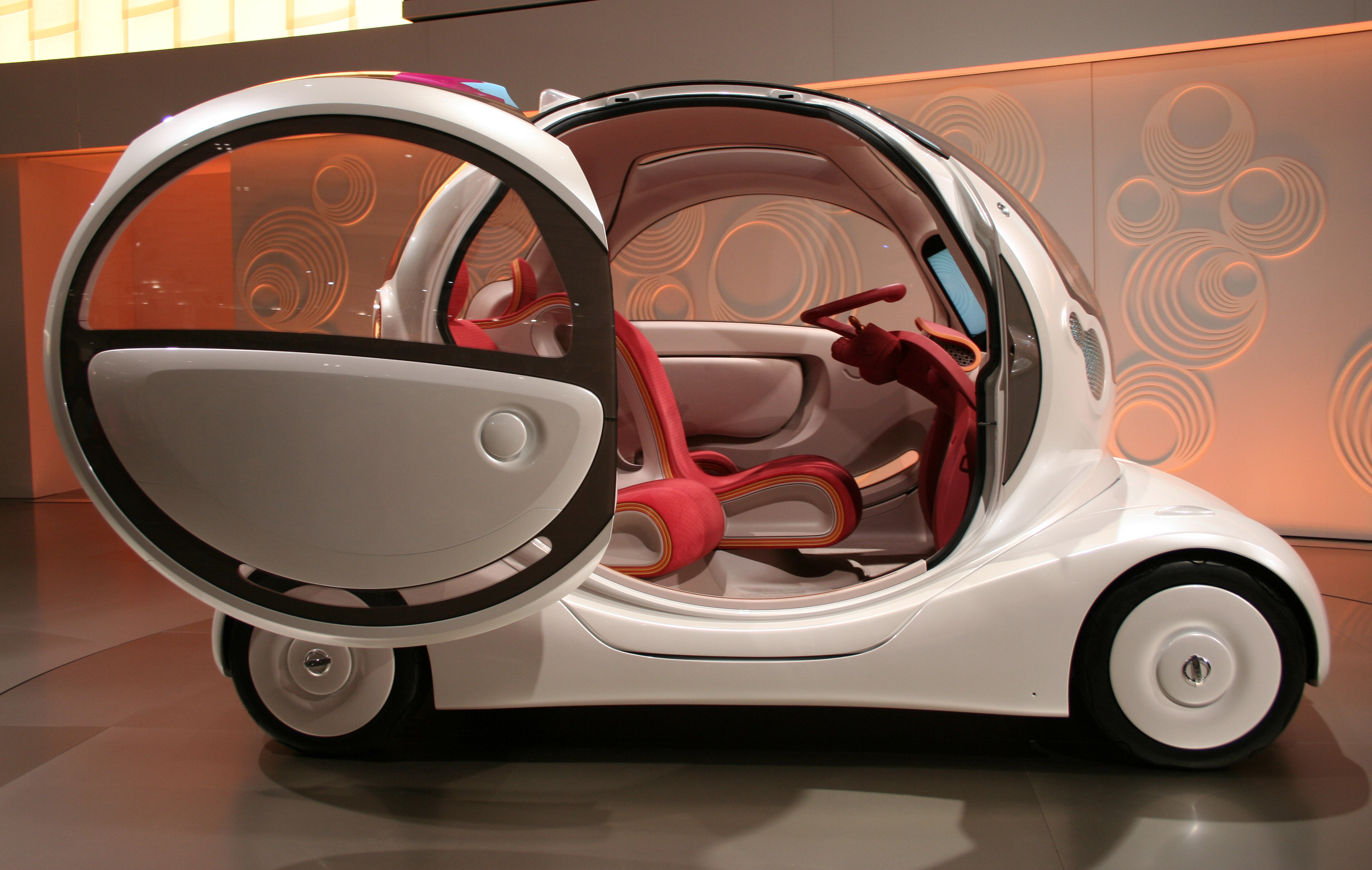
Side view with open door

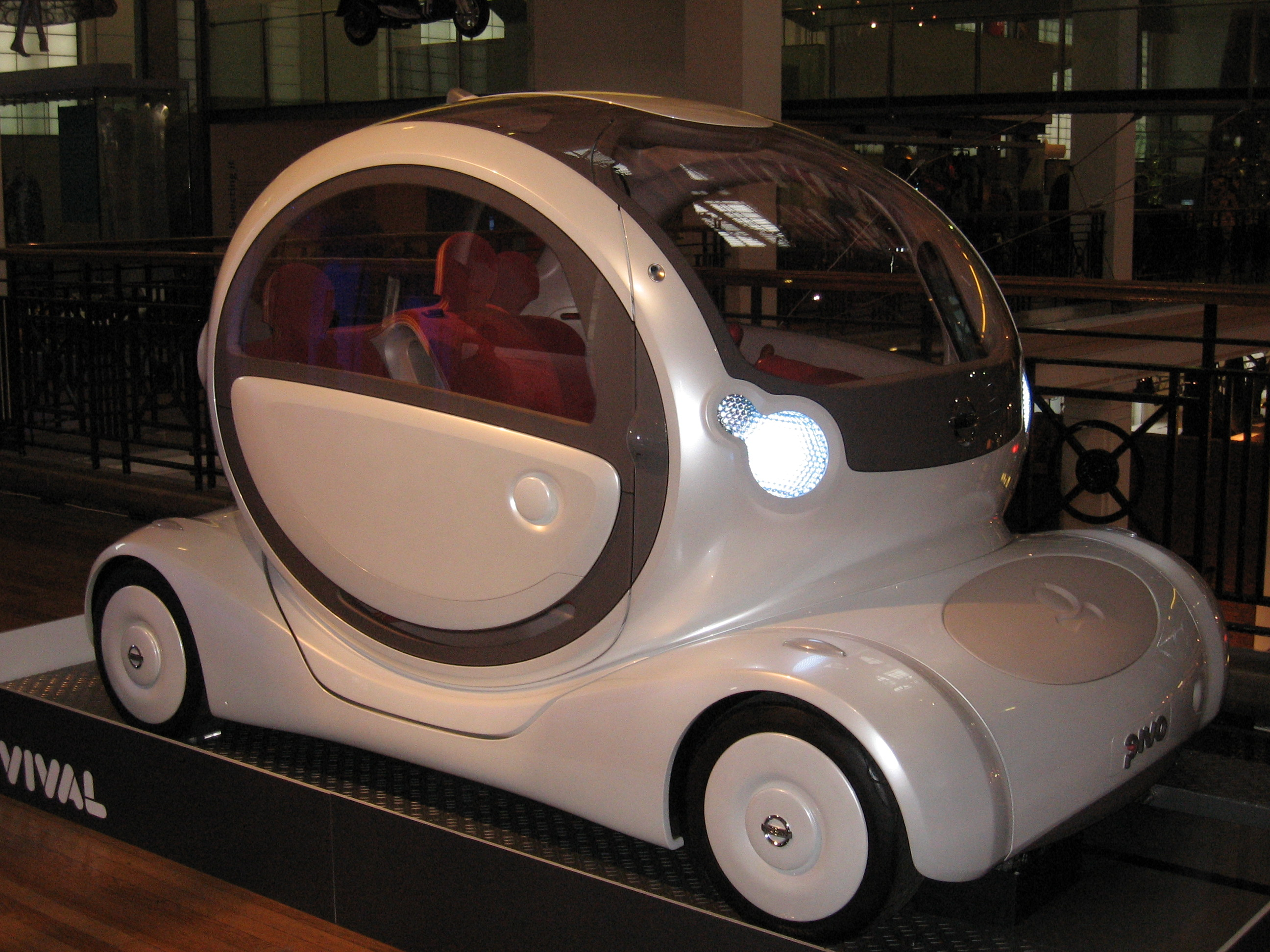
A 2005 Pivo at the London Science Museum.

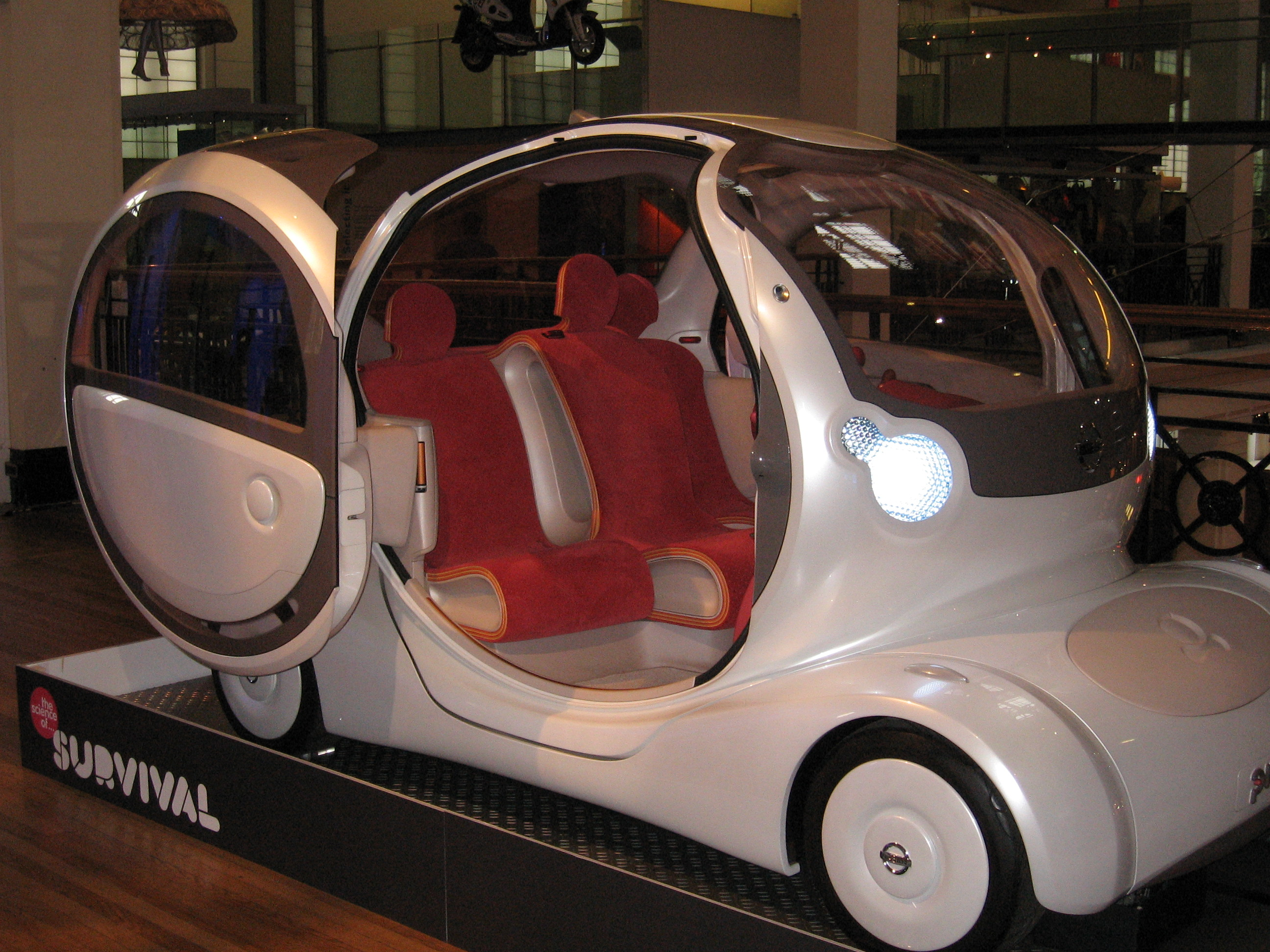
The concept car with open doors.

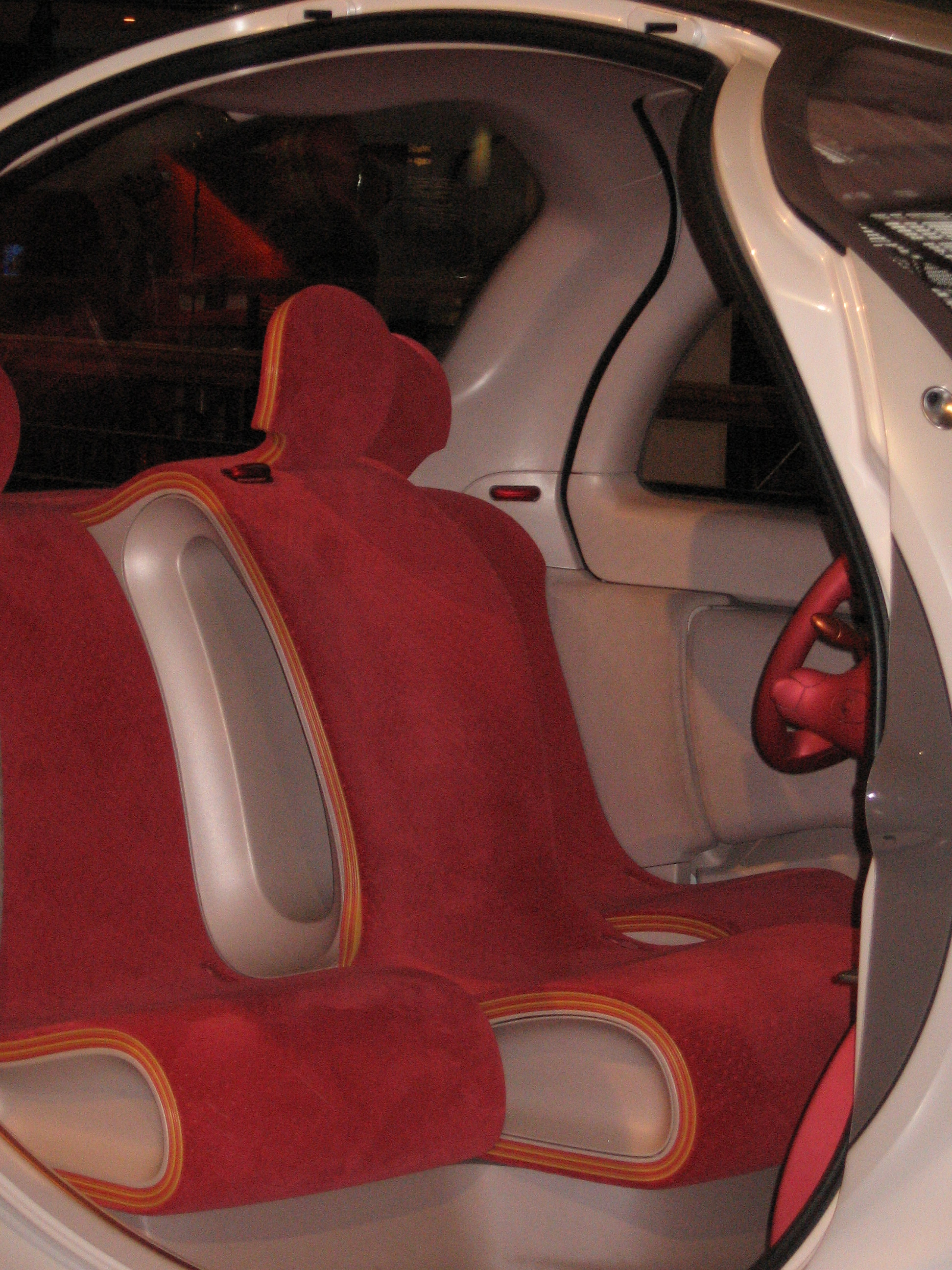
The car's interior.

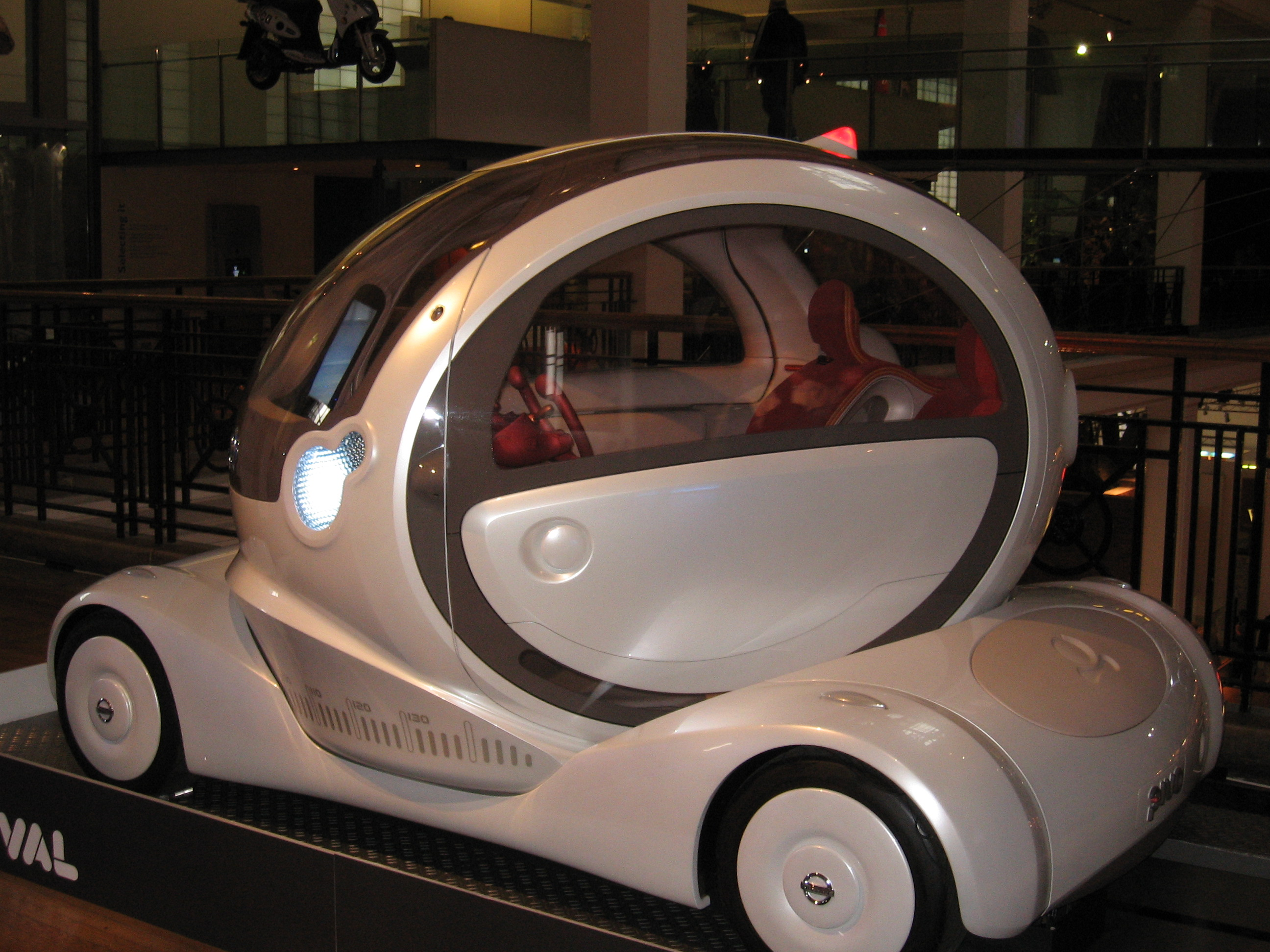
The center section of the car rotating.

== Pivo 2 ==
An updated version of the concept, designated Pivo 2 was unveiled in 2007. The wheels have been moved to rotating pods that allow the car to drive in any direction. Along with the rotating cabin, this allows the car to pull up next to a parking space, and instead of conventional parallel parking, the wheels and cab simply rotate 90°, and the car drives in sideways. The rotating cab also now has only one door (the front of the cab itself), allowing passengers to exit or enter from any direction desired. The car also has an inbuilt robot companion.

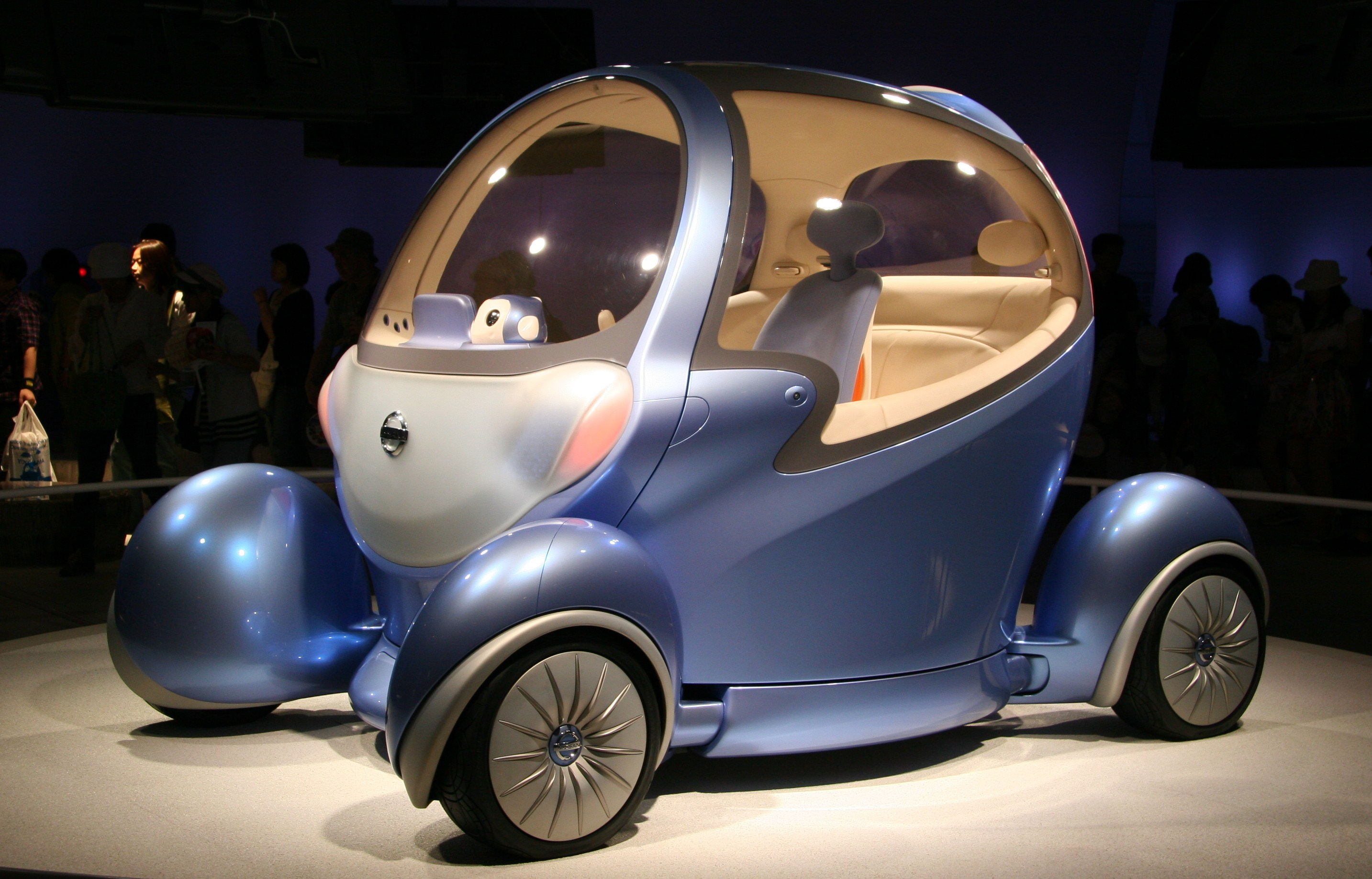
Nissan Pivo 2

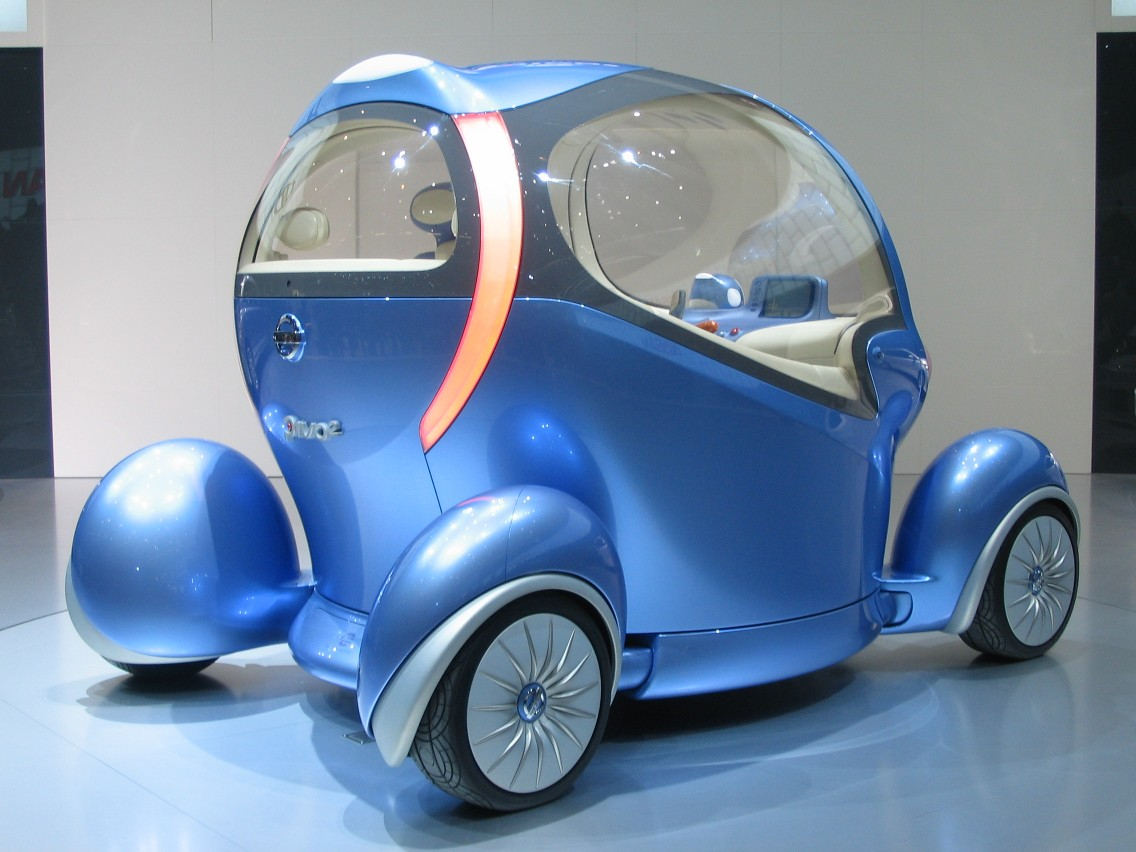
Rear view

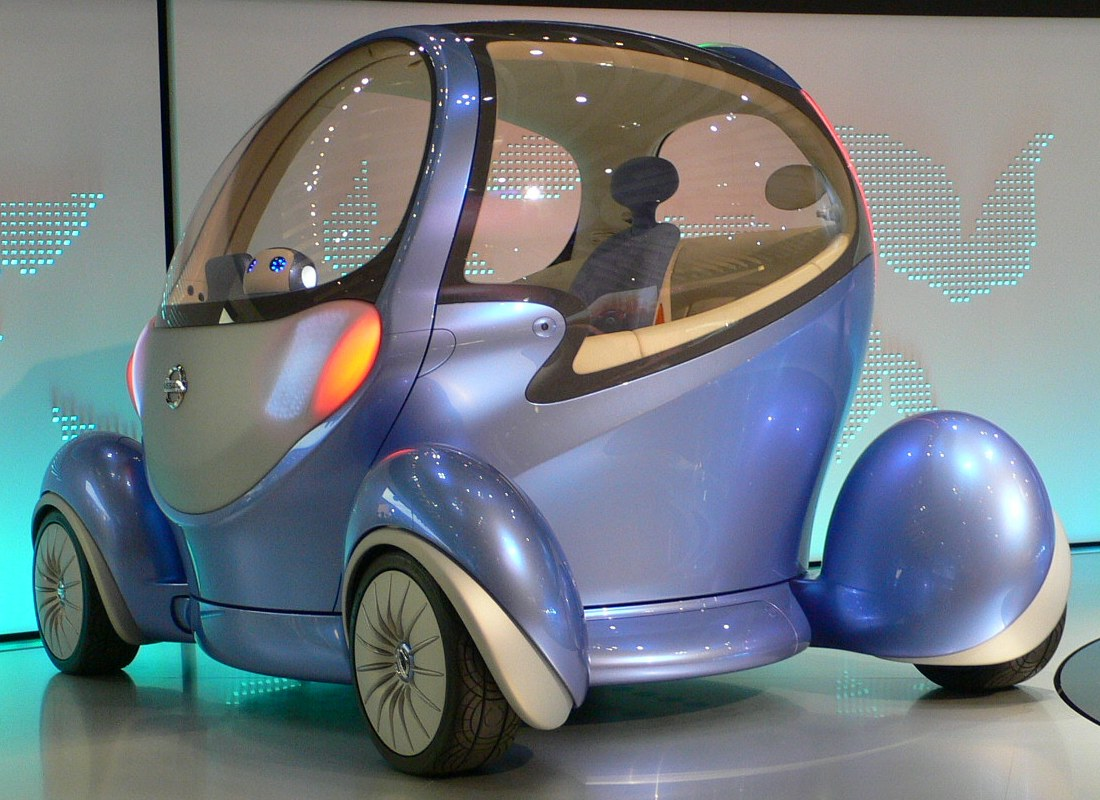
View of the center section of the Pivo 2 while its rotating

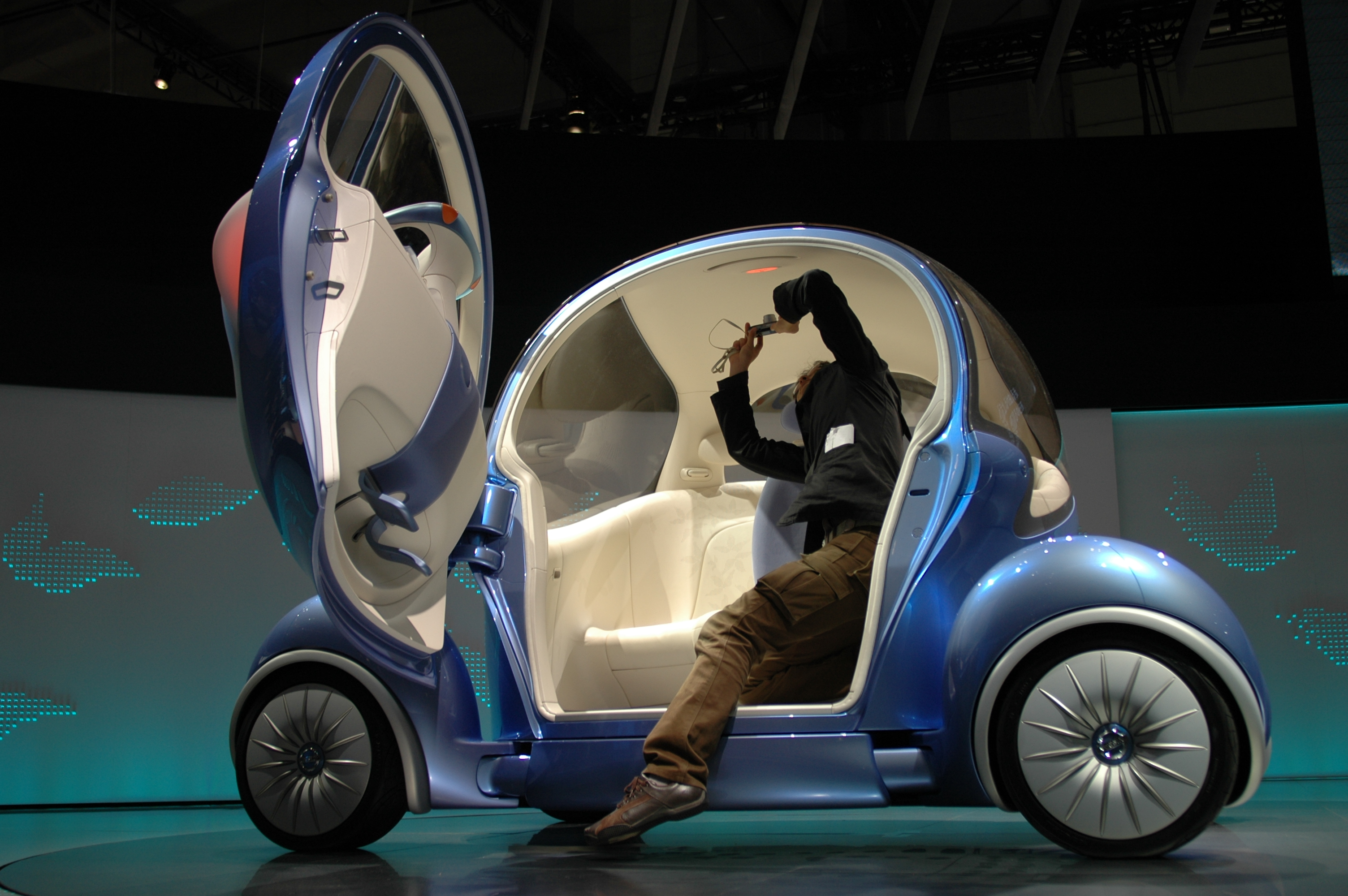
Pivo 2 with the door open

== Pivo 3 ==
The updated Pivo 3 concept was unveiled at the 2011 Tokyo Motor Show. The concept has one seat in the front and two in the back. The Pivo 3 features Nissan's Automated Valet Parking (AVP), which allows the car to park itself and recharge itself while parked, at specially-equipped parking lots. Also the system can find a parking space, physically park the car or remember where they parked their car. The Pivo 3 can be remotely maneuvered with a smartphone.

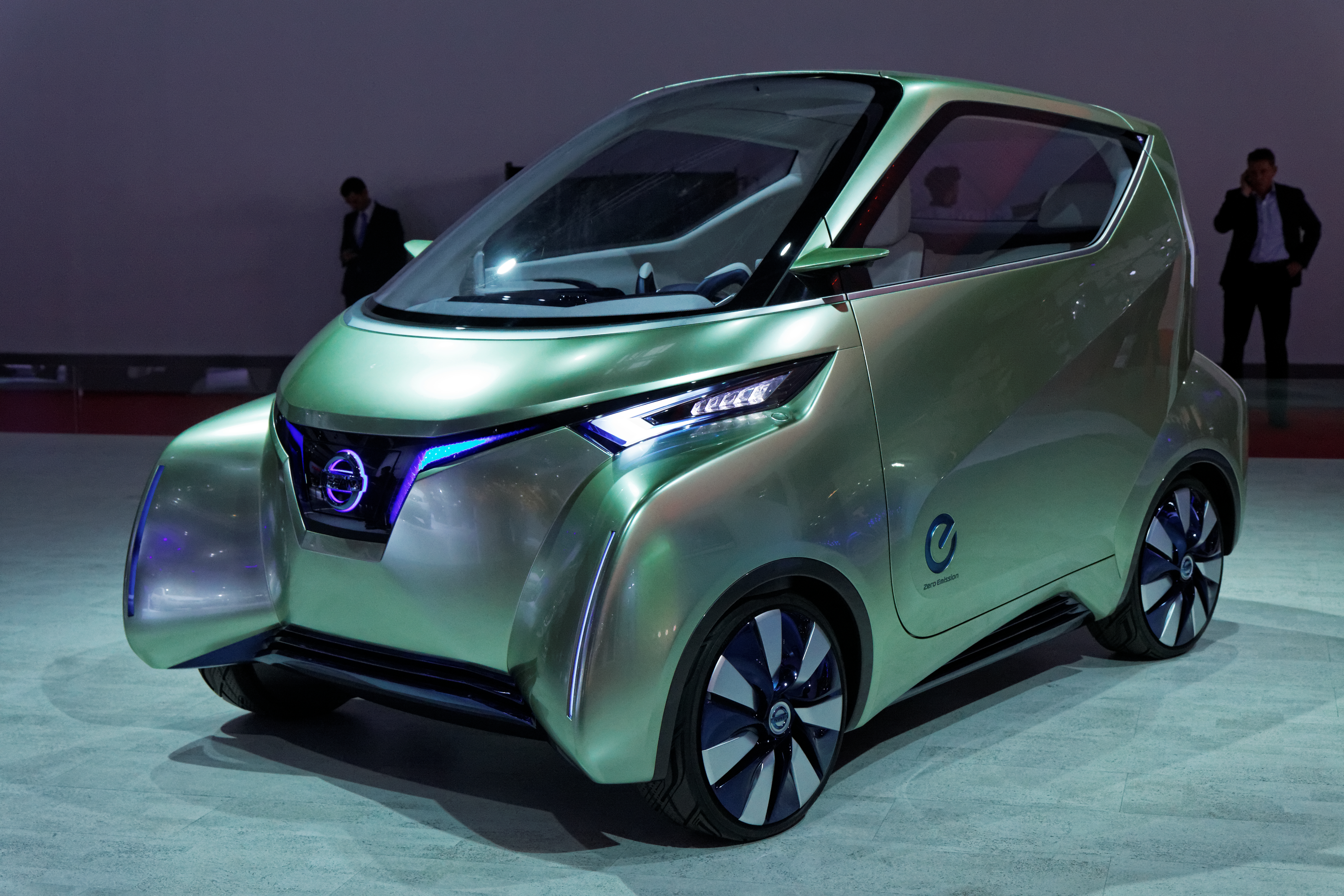
Nissan Pivo 3 at the 2012 Paris Motor Show

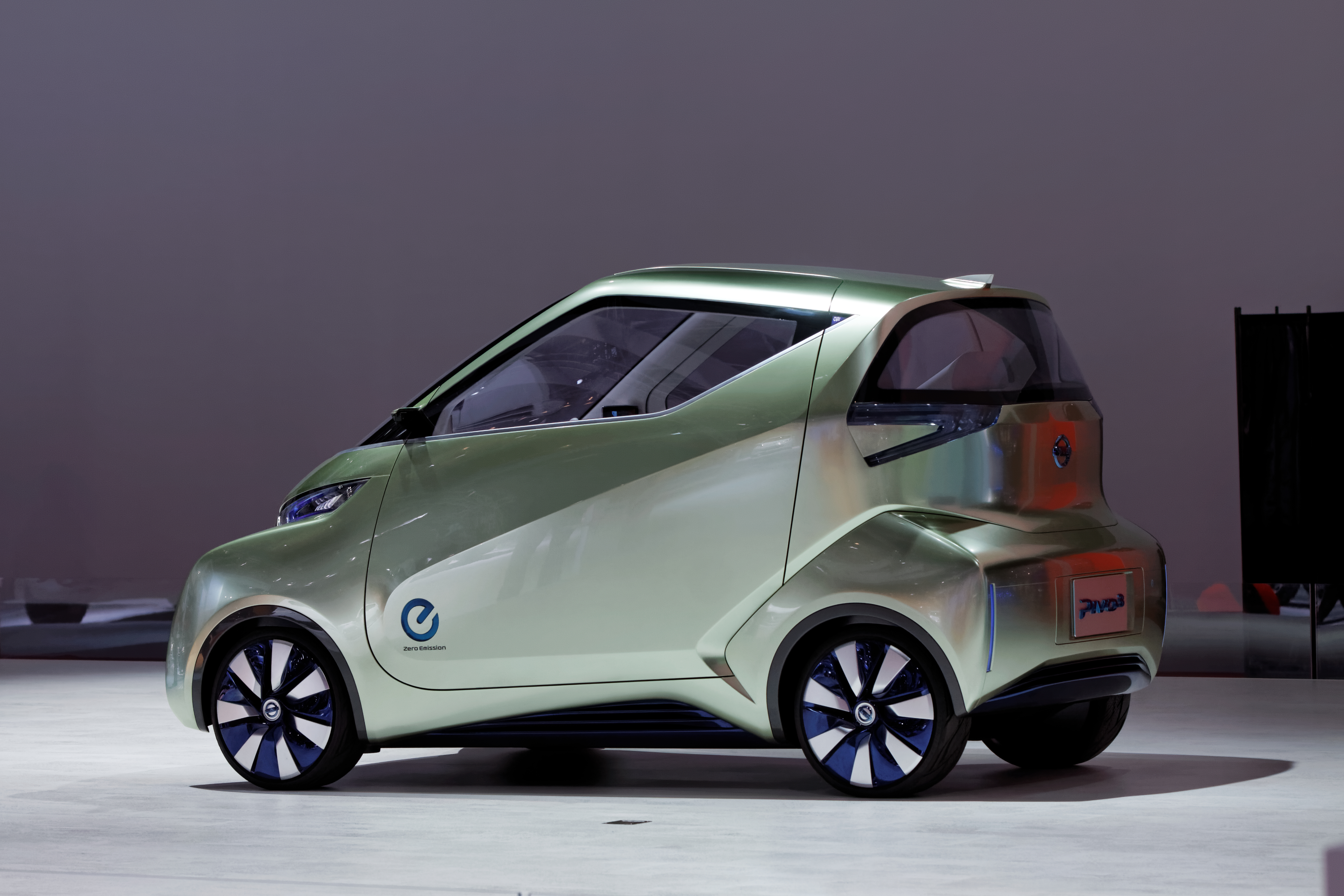
Rear view

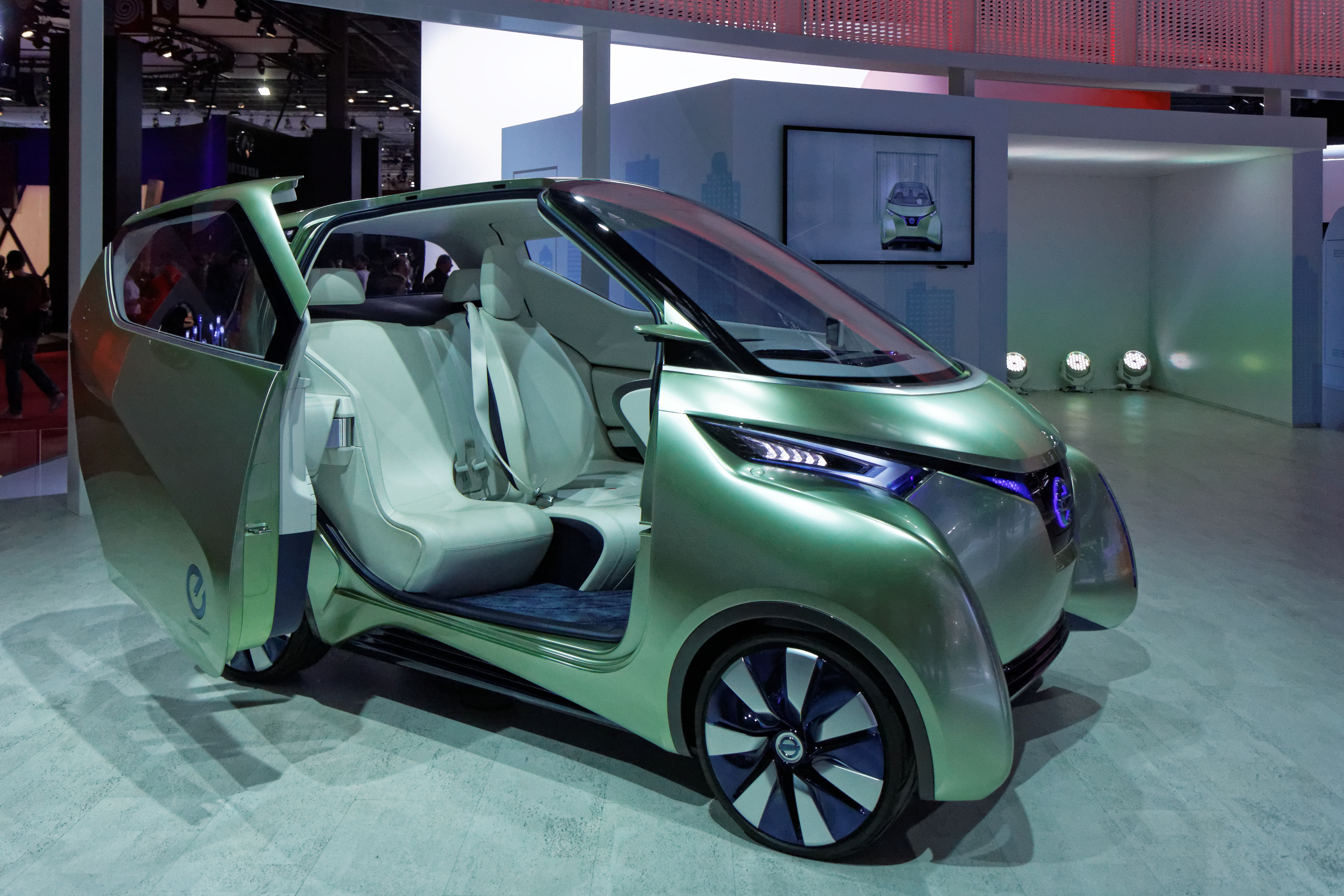
View with the door open

== See also ==
- Nissan Actic
- Nissan Terranaut
