= Autonomous bicycle =

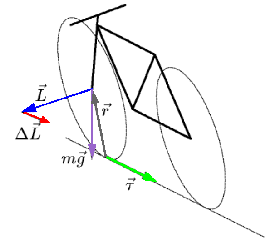
Forces acting on a bicycle are studied in bicycle dynamics

An autonomous bicycle is a bicycle and autonomous robot capable of moving and navigating without continuous human guidance, navigation, and control. This is achieved through the use of sensors, control systems, and actuators that maintain balance, steer, and navigate automatically from a parked state to a destination.

It has been proposed for use in bicycle-sharing systems (sometimes referred to as "city bikes"), so that bicycles can travel autonomously upon request, thereby becoming more accessible and serving a larger number of users. This could offer a solution to the common "first and last mile" challenge in both passenger and freight transport. An autonomous bicycle can, for instance, travel on its own between charging stations and areas with high demand. One use case could be picking up a user traveling to or from their home and a public transport hub, after which the unoccupied bike could "ride" autonomously to the next user.

Currently, autonomous bicycles have primarily been used in research and demonstrations, and have not seen widespread commercial application. Compared to autonomous cars, autonomous bicycles offer the advantage of providing active mobility and sustainable transport for users of all ages; furthermore, bicycles enhance road safety, as they pose a lower risk of fatal outcomes for vulnerable road users and others sharing the road. Similar principles can be used for e-scooters.

== Areas of application ==
- Shared mobility: Autonomous bicycles can reduce transport inequality by being able to pick up users, thereby providing more transport options.
- Research and teaching: Two-wheeled bicycles are widely used for testing and demonstration in control engineering and robotics because they are unstable and nonlinear.
- Road safety: Self-driving bicycles pose less of a danger to vulnerable road users compared to self-driving cars. Unmanned, autonomous bicycles can also be used to train collision-warning systems in cars.
- Assistance: Self-balancing technology can be used to help cyclists with impaired balance, or generally at low speeds.

== History ==
For the 2004 DARPA Grand Challenge, Anthony Levandowski built a groundbreaking self-driving motorcycle.

Several universities have developed robotic bicycles to study bicycle dynamics and their control. For instance, the Cornell Autonomous Bicycle Project Team published a number of articles in 2014 and 2019, as well as several reports.

In 2016, Google in the Netherlands shared an April Fools' joke featuring a video of a "self-driving bicycle," which garnered significant attention and helped make the concept known.

In 2019, researchers from Tsinghua University published an article in Nature regarding the development of an unmanned bicycle featuring object detection, tracking, voice control, obstacle avoidance, and balance control. MIT Media Lab has presented a prototype of an autonomous tricycle for bike-sharing that transforms into a bicycle when a user is ready to ride it.

In 2021, Chinese engineer Peng Zhihui published an open source project describing how to build a self-balancing, autonomous bicycle equipped with a camera and lidar.

== Technology ==
=== Prerequisites ===
For a bicycle to be made autonomous, certain prerequisites are necessary, including electronic steering (steer-by-wire), electronic braking (brake-by-wire), and a motor for propulsion (as in an e-bike). Furthermore, the bicycle must be able to maintain its balance, for instance by using a gyroscope, deployable stabilizer wheels, or by being a three-wheeled vehicle (tricycle). Finally, it must be capable of orienting itself for navigation and making decisions to avoid collisions, utilizing technologies such as GNSS, ultrasound, cameras, lidar, and the like.

=== Balance ===
Tricycles are naturally stable when stationary.

Two-wheeled bicycles, by contrast, are statically unstable and must be actively balanced. Research into bicycle dynamics has shown that a bicycle in motion can, under certain conditions, be self-stabilizing, a phenomenon that does not necessarily depend on gyroscopic effects (from the wheel) or the trail (of the fork). However, active control is required at low speeds or when stationary. Some methods include:

- Steer-based balancing: A motor turns the handlebars so that the bicycle "steers underneath" its center of mass, much like a human cyclist does. A potential advantage of this is that the cyclist can intuitively intervene and make corrections if necessary.
- Reaction wheel: A flywheel is accelerated or decelerated to create a corrective torque about the bicycle's longitudinal axis.
- Control moment gyroscope: A rapidly rotating gyroscope that is tilted to generate stabilizing forces.
- Mass displacement: A weight is moved laterally to shift the center of gravity.

Balance is typically governed by a controller, such as a PID controller or a linear–quadratic regulator, based on measurements from an inertial measurement unit (IMU).

=== Self-righting ===
Toppled share-bike

A potential challenge for an autonomous bicycle is enabling it to right itself after it has fallen over. Standard self-balancing mechanisms such as steering adjustments, reaction wheels, or gyroscopes can typically only generate minor corrective forces which can help a bicycle that is already standing to remain upright. However, lifting the full weight of a bicycle lying on the ground requires a dedicated self-righting mechanism capable of generating sufficient torque against the ground or enough momentum. Examples include deployable outriggers or training wheels, or a heavy reaction wheel paired with a powerful brake that can "kick" the bike back up, or a control moment gyroscope that tilts its gyroscope axis to generate force via precession, or robotic arms (articulated hinges, that is a mechanism with several joints or hinges) that can shift the center of mass much like a human using their arms to stand up. The bicycle having a low center of gravity can also be advantageous.

== See also ==
- Autonomous underwater vehicle, uncrewed underwater vehicle with autonomous guidance system
- Bicycle dynamics, the science of how bicycles move around
- Bicycle geometry, key measurements that define a particular bike configuration
- Non-Euclidean geometry, two geometries based on axioms closely related to those specifying Euclidean geometry
- Non-functional requirement, type of requirement in systems engineering
- Robotics, design, construction, use, and application of robots
- Unmanned surface vehicle, vehicle that operates on the surface of the water without a crew
- Vehicular automation, automation for various purposes of vehicles
- Velomobile, bicycle with a fairing
