= William J. Mitchell =

Australian architect and designer (1944–2010)

Bill Mitchell
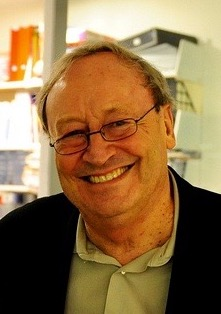
- Born: William John Mitchell; 15 December 1944; Horsham, Victoria, Australia
- Died: 11 July 2010 (aged 65); Boston, Massachusetts, United States
- Education: University of Melbourne, Yale University, University of Cambridge
- Occupation: Architect
- Years active: 1970—2010
- Spouse: Jane Wolfson
- Children: Emily, Billy
- Practice: MIT Media Lab
- Projects: Living Laboratory

William John Mitchell (15 December 1944 – 11 June 2010) was an Australian-born author, educator, architect and urban designer, best known for leading the integration of architectural and related design arts practice with computing and other technologies.

== Early life and education ==
Mitchell was born on 15 December 1944, in Horsham, Victoria, Australia. He earned an undergraduate degree in 1967 from the University of Melbourne with a major in architecture and was awarded master's degrees from both Yale University (a Master of Environmental Design in environmental design in 1969) and the University of Cambridge (in 1977 with a major in architecture).

== Career ==
Mitchell headed the architecture and urban design program at the Graduate School of Architecture and Urban Planning at the University of California, Los Angeles starting in 1970. He was named the G. Ware and Edythe M. Travelstead Professor of Architecture and director of the Master of Design Studies program at the Harvard Graduate School of Design in 1986 and was named as Professor of Architecture and Media Arts and Sciences and Dean of the MIT School of Architecture and Planning in 1992. His 1977 book Computer-Aided Architectural Design and his 1990 work The Logic of Architecture: Design, Computation and Cognition were credited by The New York Times as having "profoundly changed the way architects approached building design".

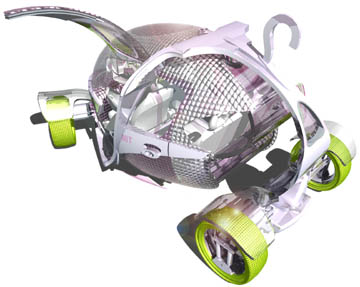
A conceptual design of the MIT Car.

At MIT, Mitchell served as an advisor to MIT President Charles Marstiller Vest in guiding a decade-long, five-building expansion project at the university that included designs by Charles Correa, Frank Gehry, Steven Holl, Fumihiko Maki and Kevin Roche, and added one million square feet of classroom, office and other spaces to the MIT campus. The building project became the subject of his 2007 book Imagining MIT: Designing a Campus for the 21st Century, which was written in a single weekend while he was at a Dublin hotel. At the dedication ceremonies for the Frank Gehry-designed Stata Center in 2004, Mitchell said that schools like MIT "carry a particular responsibility to conceive of architectural projects not just as the rational allocation of resources to achieve quantifiable management goals, but also as inventive, critical contributions to our evolving culture" and that anything less would be "a betrayal of their advertised principles".

Starting in 2003, he created the Smart Cities program within the MIT Media Lab. Projects that Mitchell developed as part of the Smart Cities program included GreenWheel, a device that would add electric power to a bicycle; RoboScooter, a foldable electric scooter; and the MIT Car (also called the "CityCar", and developed into the Hiriko), which would be propelled by electric motors built into its wheels. The car and scooter projects were envisioned as being made available for public use at locations in cities, with access and scheduling controlled by computer. The MIT Car was designed to fold up into a more compact shape while parked. Following Mitchell's death, the CityCar Project was continued under the direction of Kent Larson in the Changing Places research group at the MIT Media Lab.

Along with colleagues Kent Larson and Alex Pentland at the Massachusetts Institute of Technology, Mitchell is credited with first exploring the concept of a Living Laboratory as an approach that represents a user-centric research methodology for sensing, prototyping, validating and refining complex solutions in multiple and evolving real life contexts.

Mitchell was a Fellow of the American Academy of Arts and Sciences and was awarded seven honorary degrees. He was a prolific author, writing almost a dozen notable books, plus assorted papers, articles, and speeches.

== Personal life ==
A resident of Cambridge, Massachusetts, Mitchell died due to complications of cancer at age 65 on 11 June 2010. He was survived by his second wife, Jane Wolfson and their son, as well as by a daughter from his first marriage, to Elizabeth Asmis.

== Recognition ==
In 2012, the Australian Institute of Architects International Chapter established the William J. Mitchell Prize to commemorate his contributions to the field. The prize, awarded in even-numbered years, recognises individual contribution to architecture internationally.

== Bibliography ==
- Mitchell, William J. (1994). The Reconfigured Eye: Visual Truth in the Post-Photographic Era. Cambridge, Mass.: The MIT Press. ISBN 9780262631600.
- Mitchell, William J. (1996). City of Bits: Space, Place, and the Infobahn. Boston: The MIT Press. ISBN 9780262631761.
- Mitchell, William J. (2000). e-topia: "Urban Life, Jim—But Not As We Know It". Boston: The MIT Press. ISBN 9780262632058.
- Mitchell, William J. (2004). Me++: The Cyborg Self and the Networked City. Boston: The MIT Press. ISBN 9780262633130.

== See also ==
- Campus of the Massachusetts Institute of Technology
- Australian Institute of Architects Awards and Prizes

== Books ==
- Mitchell, William J.; Borroni-Bird, Christopher; Burns, Lawrence D. (2010). Reinventing the Automobile: Personal Urban Mobility for the 21st Century (1st. ed.). The MIT Press. ISBN 978-0-262-01382-6. Archived from the original on 9 June 2010.
- World's Greatest Architect: Making, Meaning, and Network Culture (2008), ISBN 0262633647
- Mitchell, William J.; afterword by Charles M. Vest (2007). Imagining MIT : Designing a campus for the twenty-first century (Online-Ausg. ed.). Cambridge, Mass.: MIT. ISBN 978-0262134798.
- Placing Words: Symbols, Space, and the City (2005), ISBN 0262633221
- Me++: The Cyborg Self and the Networked City (2003), ISBN 0262633132
- e-topia: Urban Life, Jim—But Not As We Know It (1999), ISBN 0262632055
- High Technology and Low-Income Communities, with Donald A. Schön and Bish Sanyal (1998), ISBN 026269199X
- City of Bits: Space, Place, and the Infobahn (1996), Cambridge MA: MIT Press, ISBN 0262631768
- The Reconfigured Eye: Visual Truth in the Post-Photographic Era (1992), Cambridge MA: MIT Press, ISBN 978-0262631600
- The Logic of Architecture: Design, Computation, and Cognition (1990), ISBN 0262631164
- Computer-Aided Architectural Design (1977), New York: Petrocelli/Charter, ISBN 978-0884053231 — A seminal work on the use of Computer-Aided Design tools in architectural design
