= Nissan Terranaut =

2006 concept car

The Nissan Terranaut was a 4x4 concept car shown at the Geneva Motor Show in 2006. It was described by its manufacturer as being designed for scientists, geologists, archaeologists or adventurers and would have seated three people including an operator of a workstation.

== Design ==
The car houses three seats and a rotating spherical pod, which allows the driver to quickly rotate to their desired position outside. It measures 4.965m from stem to stern and is just over two metres tall and two metres wide. The purpose of the extra room is to house a mini laboratory for use in the field. It has enough refrigerated storage space to support the car's three operators for up to a week out in the field and tents and sleeping bags may be stored in the door's storage compartments.

On the exterior of the car, low overhang and good ground clearance allow the Terranaut to traverse into rough terrain. Instead of a trunk at the back of the car, the Terranaut features an air lock drawer, which allows easy and safe access to clinical samples placed in the air lock drawer by someone on the outside by a lab analyst still inside the car. External displays and touch screens on the rear of the car allow those on the outside data access to information stored inside the vehicle. A controlled atmosphere on the interior may be maintained through the use of highly reflective glass, which bars sun, glare, snow or ice from disrupting scientific analysis inside the vehicle.

A glass dome centered over the rear portion of the car's roof allows for an easy escape route in case of an emergency. The roof also features a circular housing for satellite positioning equipment. A display positioned on the interior of the glass dome allows the passenger seated inside access to images created by a camera positioned on the outside of the vehicle. Touch pads are used to open the car's doors electrically.
