= CityCar =

Concept automobile

Sketch of the CityCar, the ultra-small vehicle developed by MIT Media Lab.

The CityCar or MIT CityCar is an urban all-electric concept car designed at the Massachusetts Institute of Technology Media Lab. The project was conceived by William J. Mitchell and his Smart Cities Research Group. It is now led by Kent Larson, Director of the Changing Places Research Group at the Media Lab. The project came into reality in 2003 under the support of General Motors. Time magazine choose the CityCar to be one of the "Best Inventions of 2007".

Hiriko Driving Mobility, a Spanish consortium, created a commercial version based on the CityCar and began manufacturing of test pre-production cars in 2012. The production car, called Hiriko, is scheduled to begin a trial in Vitoria-Gasteiz by late July 2012 as part of a carsharing program. Other trials are expected to follow in Bilbao, Boston, Malmö, and the Hiriko Fold, one of the three models planned for production, is scheduled to go on sale in 2013.

== History ==
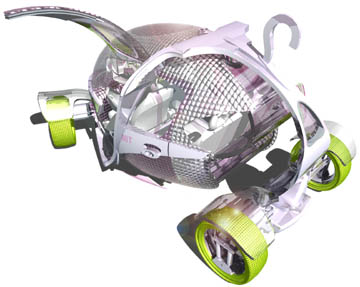

The MIT CityCar is a concept car project conceived at the MIT Media Lab, for the purpose of exploring the idea of urban mobility. This intensive study on advanced human traveling has been in progress since 2003. Designed for fluid movement in downtown cores, the concept car research is designed for passengers to navigate the city intelligently and ecologically. This project comprises the testing and making of a vehicle which re-invents the car as an object, and redefines the user's relationship to metropolitan patterns. The intention was to take the design process "out of the box" of automotive design alone. The prototype will be designed from a new perspective: that of architecture, energy, ecology, urban planning, and urban design.

The project was formally led by architect Frank Gehry. General Motors has been responsible for much of the support and resources as well as the MIT Design Lab, Smart Cities Group. Research developed for the concept vehicle is divided into four main groups: CityCar, Athlete, Zero Car, and Transology.

== Mobility on demand ==
The CityCar concept was developed as the cleanest, economical and sustainable solution to meet the demand for personal urban mobility in densely populated cities, and was designed for cities as opposed to the conventional automobile, which shaped the city layout and landscape during the 20th century. The main purpose of the car is to supplement public transportation systems, providing mobility for the first and last part of a trip, which means that ideal deployment would be in urban car sharing fleets located near public transport hubs. This operational scheme is called "Mobility on Demand" system. The CityCar could also be used for short trips in government and corporate urban fleets to provide services such as mail and commercial deliveries, police patrolling, etc.

== Design concept ==
The CityCar concept was designed as an all-electric four-wheel ultra-small vehicle (USV) for two passengers, and drive-by-wire driver interface. Each wheel is independently digitally controlled, with its own wheel motor, which enables them to move in different direction and speed, and allows the wheels to rotate up to 120 degrees, allowing for turning on a dime or 0-degree turn radius, thus giving the vehicle more precise maneuverability. This feature makes the CityCar suitable for urban conditions, as it can perform sideways motions for parallel parking, and O-turns instead of the conventional three-point turns.

This wheel arrangement allows entry and exit at four points around the vehicle's perimeter. The CityCar was designed for front entry, which is feasible because there is no engine in the way. Baggage and emergency entry and exit are at the rear, and there is no side entry and exit. This configuration allows nose-in parking to the curb, and passenger embarkation from the sidewalk rather than from the road, which allows the elimination of the need for side clearance between parked vehicles. It also simplifies the vehicle, which does not need to accommodate door openings.

The CityCar was designed with a collapsible frame through a four-bar linkage that enables the vehicle to fold up for more compact parking, making possible to stack three or four CityCars in the length of a traditional parking bay, a particularly efficient feature in crowded urban settings. Safety systems operate at multiple levels. The car's folding mechanism also provides space for crash-deceleration systems. Its electronic sensing and wireless communications contribute to reduce the likelihood of crashes. And if a crash occurs, the low mass and relatively low speed reduce the energy involved in a crash with a similar vehicle. Seat belts and airbags will still be needed.

== Specifications ==
The CityCar will be driven with a joystick or optionally an electronic steering wheel. The prototype is 2.5 metres (8 ft 2 in) long and folds to 1.5 metres (4 ft 11 in) when parked, and weighs less than 1,000 pounds (450 kg). The top speed is 50 kilometres per hour (31 mph) and to which it can accelerate from rest in 3 seconds. The all-electric range is 120 kilometres (75 mi). The lithium-ion battery pack is located in the floor and can be recharged in 12 minutes. The electric car will be capable of climbing grades up to 20 percent.

The CityCar is 60% the size of a Smart Car, and its lithium-ion battery pack is expected to deliver the equivalent of 150 to 200 mpg_{-us} (1.2 to 1.6 L/100 km; 180 to 240 mpg_{-imp}) with no tailpipe emissions.

== Field testing ==
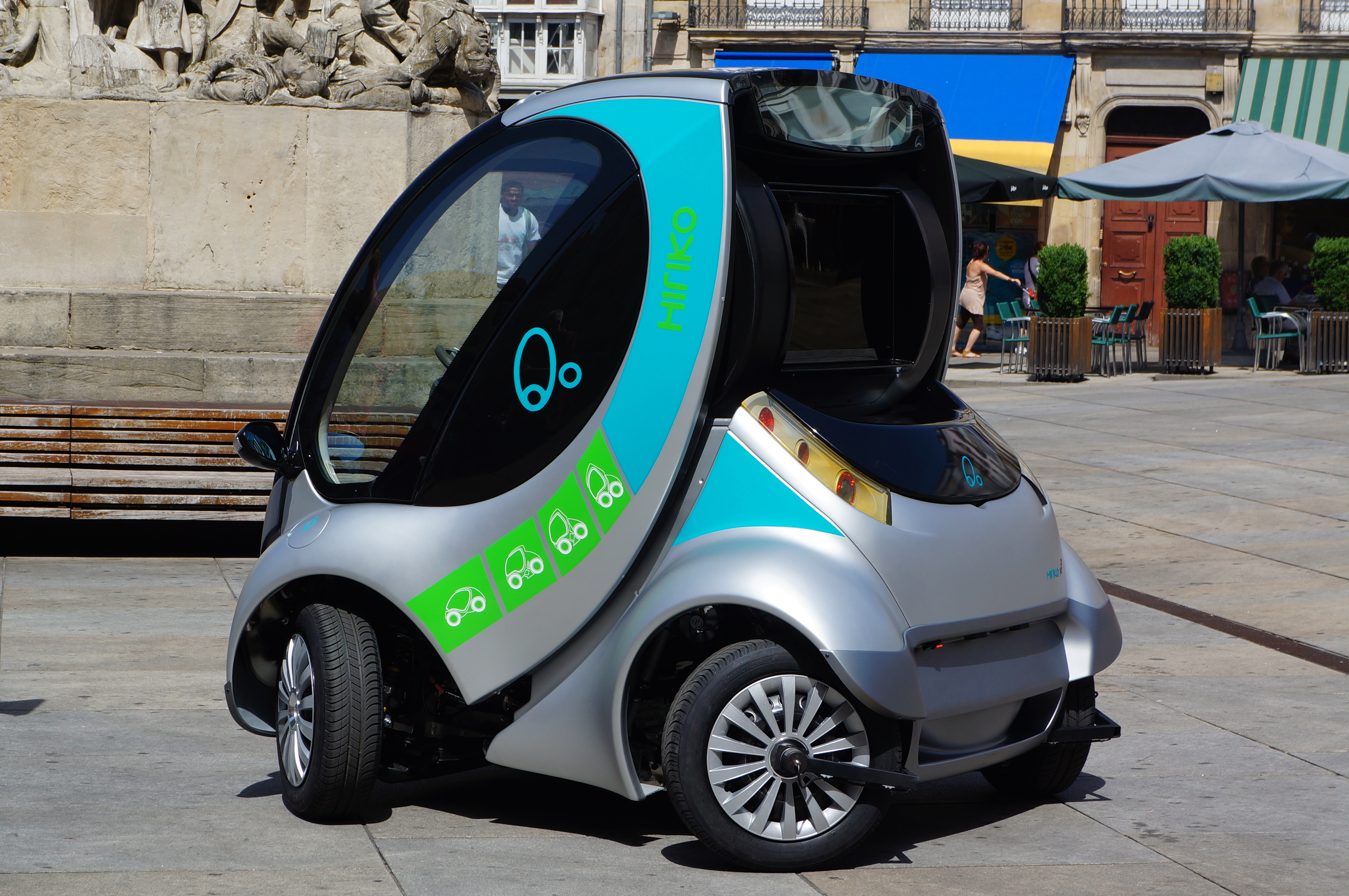
Hiriko Fold pre-production model at a demonstration in Vitoria-Gasteiz, Spain.

The Spanish consortium Hiriko Driving Mobility, which included the MIT Media Lab Smart Cities Group, was to build a commercial model called Hiriko based on the concept of the CityCar for testing in several European cities. Production of 20 test pre-production cars began in 2012 in Vitoria-Gasteiz. The first demonstration trial was scheduled to begin In Vitoria-Gasteiz by late July 2012. The trial was to begin with 6 Hirikos as part of a carsharing program run by the city, with two pick up/drop off points, and the service will be available to all citizens at a cost of €9 (US$11) per hour. Other trials were expected to take place in Bilbao, Spain, Boston, US, and Malmö, Sweden.

The Hiriko Fold, one of the three models planned for production, was scheduled to go on sale in 2013 for around €12,500 (US$16,400), and the consortium's plan was to sell the Hiriko to municipalities, including Barcelona, Berlin and San Francisco. The company also planned to promote the cars to cities across Europe to expand their carsharing programs.

The entire project was shut down and its participants laid off, some of which are now suing for severance pay. The project's assets were frozen in 2015, and some former employees have revealed that some parts of the car debuted in 2012 were glued with Velcro and superglue. In the end only one car was ever completed and two were left semi-finished. MIT team leader Kent Larson said that in the time it took to try to manufacture Hiriko, its technology had already become "obsolete". He sees the niche covered by self driving vehicles.

== See also ==
- Alternatives to the automobile
- Bubble car
- Electric car
- General Motors EN-V
- Microcar
- Nissan Pivo
- Personal Urban Mobility and Accessibility (P.U.M.A.)
- Product ecosystem theory, first proposed in a 2013 paper based on a case study of the CityCar
- Renault Twizy Z.E.
- VisLab, and their VIAC intercontinental challenge (driving from Italy to China with autonomous vehicles)
- Folding Zaschka Three-wheeler
- Suzuki's Pixy concept and Q-Concept
- Tesla, Inc.
