= Kurt Joachim Lauk =

German businessman and former politician (born 1946)

Kurt Joachim Lauk (born 19 May 1946) is a German businessman and former politician who served as a Member of the European Parliament for Baden-Württemberg from 2004 until 2009.

== Early life and career ==
Lauk has an MA in history and theology from LMU Munich and received his MBA from the Stanford Graduate School of Business in 1977. He earned his Ph.D. in political science from Kiel University in Germany.

== Career ==
Between 1978 and 1984, Lauk led Boston Consulting Group's German practice. He was deputy chief executive officer and chief financial o(with responsibility for finance, controlling and marketing) of Audi AG between 1989 and 1992. Ten months after the trans-Atlantic merger that created DaimlerChrysler A.G. in 1999, Lauk, then the head of Daimler's truck division, stepped down along with Thomas T. Stallkamp, CEO of Chrysler, and Heiner Tropitzsch, Daimler’s personnel chief.

Lauk is the co-founder and president of Globe CP GmbH, a private investment firm established in 2000.

== Political career ==
=== European Parliament ===
Lauk is a member of the conservative Christian Democratic Union, part of the European People's Party. He was a Member of the European Parliament from 2004 to 2009, during which time he served on the Economic and Monetary Affairs Committee and a deputy member of the Foreign Affairs Committee.

=== Economic Council ===
From 2000 until 2015, Lauk served as president of the Economic Council of the Christian Democratic Party, a business-based advisory group closely affiliated with the party yet not officially part of it. In this capacity, he was also an adviser to German Chancellor Angela Merkel.

As head of the Economic Council, Lauk advocated a more forceful discussion of economic issues in Germany and has been highly critical of Merkel’s economic policies. He has been a vocal critic of Merkel's reluctance to introduce bold economic reforms, often arguing that she has been bowing to pressure from the Social Democratic Party over several major issues, including the introduction of a minimum wage and pensions increases. On government proposals to cut the retirement age for veteran workers to 63 and increase pensions for mothers in 2014, Lauk argued that Germany was setting "a bad example" not only for vulnerable southern European nations but also for France.

In 2010, Lauk described German industry as "the infrastructure provider to emerging countries" for the next 10 years, yet warned that promising areas like software, biogenetics and nanotechnologies were lacking. As for Germany's role as world export leader, he argued that the country's current weakness suggested that over the next decade it could probably sink to a middling place in the global top ten.

In a 2015 letter published in Frankfurter Allgemeine Zeitung, Lauk wrote to German lawmakers urging them to vote against the Merkel government’s proposal for a four-month extension of Greece's bailout, arguing that "a simple extension of the aid program without effective terms would mean that we are knowingly throwing further good money after bad".

== Other activities ==
=== Corporate boards ===
- Hennessy Capital, Independent Member of the Board of Directors (since 2020)
- Tachyum, Member of the Board of Advisors (since 2019)
- Nomura Holdings, Chair of the Advisory Board on Investment Banking in Germany and Austria (since 2018)
- Magna International, Independent Member of the Board of Directors (since 2014)
- Société Générale, Chairman of the Advisory Board on Corporate & Investment Banking in Germany (since 2010)
- Ciber, Member of the Board of Directors (since 2010)
- Agora Strategy Group, Member of the Supervisory Board
- Solera Holdings, Member of the Board of Directors (2013–2019)

=== Non-profit organizations ===
- Munich Security Conference (MSC), Member of the Security Innovation Board (since 2021)
- German Council on Foreign Relations (DGAP), Member of the Advisory Council
- International Institute for Strategic Studies (IISS), Member of the Board of Trustees
- Trilateral Commission, Member of the European Group

== Controversy ==
In September 2019, Lauk filed a lawsuit in the United States District Court for the Central District of California, alleging Vista Equity Partners sought to use its control of Solera Holdings' board for its own benefit by urging its directors – including himself – to buy at inflated prices other companies the firm owns. He also argued that he was removed from his position on the board of directors in May 2019 after he demanded an investigation into what he alleged was Vista’s “self-dealing.” In a response, Vista denied all charges and argued instead that Lauk was a “crony” of Solera’s former CEO Tony Aquila who had been fired in May 2019 over allegations of “aggressive and abusive” behavior.
