= Richard Kim =

Richard Kim may refer to:

- Richard E. Kim (1932–2009), Korean-American writer and professor of literature
- Richard Kim (karate) (1917–2001), martial arts expert and teacher
- Richard Kim (car designer), Canadian car designer (2004-present)
- Richard Kim, executive editor of The Nation
- Richard C. Kim, U.S. Army general
