= Solera Holdings =

U.S. software company

- Type: Private
- Industry: Software
- Founded: 2005
- Headquarters: Westlake, Texas
- Key people: Darko Dejanovic (CEO)
- Revenue: ▲$1,140.85 Million USD (2015)
- Number of employees: 4,000
- Parent: Vista Equity Partners
- Website: solera.com

Solera Inc is an American company based in Texas which provides risk management and asset protection software and services to the automotive industry and property insurance marketplace. Solera also provides digital identity management services, as well as re-underwriting and data analytics for the automotive, property and casualty insurance industries. Solera is active in 88 countries across six continents.

Solera became part of the S&P 400 after an Initial public offering in May 2007. In March 2016, however, Solera was bought out by private equity firm Vista Equity Partners, once more becoming a private entity.

Companies owned by Solera include HPI, Autodata, and Sidexa.

== Company history ==
Solera was founded in January 2005 by American businessman Tony Aquila. In February 2006, private equity firm GTCR announced a partnership with Aquila involving investments of up to $100 million of equity capital. In April 2006, Solera and private equity firm GTCR announced the completion of their acquisition of the Claims Services Group of Automatic Data Processing (NYSE: ADP) for $975 million in cash.

In May 2007, Solera completed an IPO, trading on the New York Stock Exchange under the symbol "SLH".

In September 2015, Solera announced an agreement to be acquired by Vista Equity Partners, Goldman Sachs, Koch Industries, and other affiliated investors for approximately $6.5 billion. The transaction was completed in March 2016.

In July 2016, Solera announced it had entered into a definitive agreement to acquire Enservio, Inc, a Massachusetts-based company that provides software and services to the property contents insurance marketplace.

In 2021, Vista was reportedly planning to have Solera go public again via a special-purpose acquisition company (SPAC).

== Timeline of Acquisitions ==
- 2006: Acquisition of ADP including Audatex, Informex, Sidexa, ABZ, and Hollander
- 2008: Acquisition of Inpart, UCS, and HPI
- 2009: Acquisition of AUTOonline
- 2010: Acquisitions of Digidentity and Market Scan
- 2011: Acquisitions of Explore Information Services, Sinexia, See Progress, Commerce Delta, and New Era
- 2012: Acquisitions of CarweB, Actual Systems, APU and LMI
- 2013: Acquisition of DST and formation of a joint venture with SRS
- 2014: Acquisitions of I&S, CAP and Sherwood
- 2015: Acquisitions of Service Dynamics, IBS Automotive and DMEautomotive
- 2016: Acquisition of Enservio, and Autodata
- 2017: Acquisition of Digidentity, and Colimbra
- 2021: Acquisition of Omnitracs and DealerSocket,
- 2022: Acquisition of Spireon,
