= Darko Dejanovic =

- Born: 1970 (age 55–56)
- Education: Northwestern University – Kellogg School of Management (MBA)
- Occupations: CEO, ACTIVE Network, LLC

Darko Dejanovic is a businessman currently serving as the interim CEO of Solera Holdings.

== Career ==
Dejanovic served as the Corporate Senior Vice President and Chief Technology Officer (CTO) for the Tribune Company, where he worked from 1997 through 2007. In 2007, became Executive Vice President, Global CIO and Head of Product of Monster.com. Dejanovic accepted a position at the ACTIVE Network, LLC, in August 2011 as the Chief Technology, Product and Innovation Officer. In September 2012, Dejanovic was promoted to the President of the company, where he served through the acquisition of the company by Vista Equity Partners, upon the completion of which he was named CEO. In November 2019, Dejanovic was appointed as interim CEO to replace current CEO Jeff Tarr of Solera Holdings. While serving as interim CEO, Dejanovic continues his role as operating principal and president of Vista Intelligence Group for Vista Equity Partners.
