= HPI Ltd =

British vehicle history checking service

HPI, Ltd.
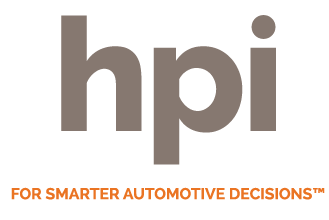
- Type: Private
- Industry: Software
- Founded: 1938; 88 years ago
- Headquarters: Leeds, England
- Key people: Christopher Wright (European Vice President)
- Number of employees: 250
- Parent: Solera Holdings
- Website: hpi.co.uk

HPI is a British vehicle history checking service founded in 1938 and part of UK automotive data business cap hpi.

HPI works alongside the police, DVLA and finance and insurance companies to generate detailed vehicle history reports for consumers in the second-hand car market. The report, called the HPI Check, informs consumers whether a vehicle has outstanding finance, been stolen, written off as a total loss, has a mileage discrepancy, had a plate change, been cloned, or has an outstanding logbook loan. The HPI Check can be performed on any vehicle that is registered in the UK with the DVLA. In 2008, HPI were acquired by Solera. HPI's Headquarters are currently situated in Leeds.
