= Economic Council Germany =

German business association

The Economic Council (German: Wirtschaftsrat der CDU e.V.) is a major German business and lobby association representing the interests of around 12,000 members and member firms. Members are drawn from all sectors of the German economy including banking and finance, insurance, the automotive and chemical industries, healthcare and high-tech.

The aim of the council is to promote a social market economy based on the principles of Ludwig Erhard, economy minister of the Federal Republic of Germany between 1949 and 1963 and widely regarded as the initiator of Germany’s Wirtschaftswunder (economic miracle) during the 1950s. Although the organisation is both financially and ideologically independent it has traditionally had close ties to the free-market liberal wing of the conservative Christian Democratic Union (CDU) of Chancellor Angela Merkel. For this reason it is referred to as the Economic Council to the CDU, which is in fact the literal translation of its German name. This description can also be attributed to the link with Erhard, who was one of the founding members of the association. The council's president is entitled ex officio to participate in meetings of the CDU Executive as a "permanent guest", including the right to speak.

== History ==
The Economic Council was founded as a coalition of professional German entrepreneurs on 9 December 1963 in Bonn, then the capital of West Germany. The aim of the council was to give firms and entrepreneurs the opportunity to have a greater say in government policy. In the words of Alphons Horten, CDU politician and one of the co-founders of the association, "There was a growing conviction in the business community that politicians should pay more heed to economic reason." An additional aim of the original founders and board members in setting up the council was to act as a counterweight to the increasingly influential employee committees within the CDU party itself.

The 50th anniversary of the council in 2013 was marked by a series of high calibre events, the pinnacle of which was the annual Wirtschaftstag. Guests included Chancellor Angela Merkel, ECB president Mario Draghi, President of the German Industry Federation Ulrich Grillo and Deutsche Bank Co-Chief Jürgen Fitschen.

== Presidents ==
- 1963–1970 Klaus Scheufelen
- 1970–1983 Philipp von Bismarck
- 1984–1989 Heinrich Weiss
- 1989–2000 Dieter Murmann
- 2000–2015 Kurt Joachim Lauk
- 2015–2019 Werner Michael Bahlsen
- Since 2019 Astrid Hamker

== Structure ==
The Economic Council is present at all levels of government with a main federal office in Berlin, so called Landesverbänden or state associations in the provincial capitals (which themselves are divided into regional sections), and more recently with representations in Brussels (2000) and New York City (2006), in recognition of the important role played by international institutions in the decision making process.

Reflecting the key aim of the council as set out by the original founders, regular events are held at all levels of the organisation giving members the chance to exchange ideas with key decision makers from the political sphere. Similarly politicians hear first-hand the concerns of the business community. Key events in the Economic Council’s calendar are the annual Wirtschaftstag, an event which brings members together with high ranking guest speakers from the political and economic worlds, the so-called Kompetenz Zentrum which provides a platform for companies to showcase new technologies and innovative ideas, and the Europe Symposium held in Brussels. The smaller state associations have similar, albeit smaller expert commissions which deal exclusively with those issues which particularly affect them at a more local level.

=== Federal expert commissions ===
A key component of the work in the federal office in Berlin is the Bundesfachkommission or expert commission. There is one such commission for each policy area. These commissions are each chaired by a high-ranking chief executive. A typical agenda includes parliamentary reports from politicians, presentations from academics, policy experts and leading entrepreneurs, as well as the formation of official positions on key government policy.

As of 2014, federal expert commissions exist for the following policy areas:

- International Economy
- European Financial and Monetary Policy
- Taxes, Budget and Finances
- Family Firms
- Labour Market
- Growth and Innovation
- Internet and Digital Economy
- Health
- Energy
- Environment
- Urban Development, Construction and Housing
- Transport, Logistics and Infrastructure.

== Aims ==
In promoting a social market economy based on the principles of Ludwig Erhard the economic council currently advocates the following policies:

- A stronger EU with an end to debt mutualisation
- Budget consolidation through less expenditure
- Simplification of the tax system and avoidance of additional burdens
- Prevention of nationalisation to the cost of the small and medium-sized firms (Mittelstand)
- An energy transformation based on free market principles
- A new balance between environmental and economic policy
- Implementation of measures against current skilled worker shortages, retention of tariff autonomy and ensure that pension system is sustainable for the future
- Increase the quality and economic efficiency of the Healthcare system
- More infrastructure investment
- Prevention of an artificial brake on rent prices
- Increase the attractiveness of Germany as a hub for research and innovation
- Unleash the economic growth capabilities of internet

== Views on EU climate policies ==
In April 2020, Wolfgang Steiger, the council's secretary general, wrote in a commentary for Sueddeutsche Zeitung that the economic consequences of the COVID-19 pandemic in Germany should lead the European Union to consider the "deferment of climate policy targets".

In August 2020, Steiger expressed opposition to plans by the European Central Bank (ECB) to make climate action an integral component of its monetary policies, saying that climate action was a "political task" for which the ECB had "no political mandate".

== Criticism ==
In March 2021, in the wake of several scandals about CDU politicians who had been accused of having overly close ties with business, the non-profit organization de:Lobbycontrol published a report in which it criticized the council for its undue influence exerted in the CDU headquarters.

== Literature ==
- Philipp von Bismarck / Karl von Wogau, MdEP, Soziale Marktwirtschaft. Die verantwortete Freiheit, Verlag für die Wirtschaft 1999.
- Ludwig Erhard, Wohlstand für alle edited by Wolfram Langer, Anaconda 2009.
- Alphons Horton, Rückblick auf ein Jahrhundert. Erinnerungen eines Zeitzeugen, Freiburg im Breisgau, 1997.
