= Canoo MPDV =

Electric van produced by Canoo

Canoo Multi-Purpose Delivery Vehicle
- Rendering of MPDV family: L–R: MPDV3, MPDV2, MPDV1

Overview
- Manufacturer: Canoo
- Also called: MPDV
- Production: Cancelled due to Bankruptcy
- Designer: Richard Kim

Body and chassis
- Class: Light duty truck
- Body style: Panel van
- Layout: FF
- Platform: Canoo Multi-Purpose
- Related: Canoo Lifestyle Vehicle

Powertrain
- Electric motor: permanent-magnet synchronous, 200 hp (150 kW)
- Transmission: single-speed reduction gear
- Battery: 40 / 60 / 80 kW-hr
- Electric range: 130–230 mi (209–370 km) (EPA)

Dimensions
- Wheelbase: 112.8 in (2,865 mm)
- Length: 172.8 in (4,389 mm) (MPDV1); 205.2 in (5,212 mm) (MPDV2)
- Width: 76.8 in (1,951 mm) (MPDV1); 86.4 in (2,195 mm) (MPDV2)
- Height: 74.4 in (1,890 mm) (MPDV1); 100.8 in (2,560 mm) (MPDV2)
- Curb weight: 3,750–4,190 lb (1,701–1,901 kg) (MPDV1); 3,970–4,410 lb (1,801–2,000 kg) (MPDV2)

The Canoo Multi-Purpose Delivery Vehicle (MPDV for short) was a line of battery electric delivery vans produced by Canoo, the first of which was unveiled in December 2020. Canoo went bankrupt in January 2025. There are three planned models, the MPDV1 and the taller MPDV2, both sharing the same wheelbase and platform as the earlier Canoo Lifestyle Vehicle, and the MPDV3, which will use an enlarged version of the same platform.

== History ==
Canoo announced it had developed the Multi-Purpose Delivery Vehicle in December 2020; although ostensibly designed as a work van to haul cargo, Canoo also touted the potential customization possibilities of the slab-sided vehicle. The price is expected to be comparable with conventional work vans powered by internal combustion engines.

Preorders opened in January 2021. Prior to the MPDV, Canoo first had announced the similarly-sized Canoo Lifestyle Vehicle for passengers in 2019, using the same Canoo Multi-Purpose Platform. The Lifestyle Delivery Vehicle (LDV) is a cargo-specific variant of the Lifestyle Vehicle intended for fleet operation, and the LDV received several notable orders in 2022, including 4,500 for retailer Walmart and 3,000 for fleet management company Zeeba. Walmart began testing LDV prototypes in the Dallas-Fort Worth area starting in summer 2022.

Limited quantities of the MPDV were scheduled to start becoming available in 2022; an initial production target of 1,000 Canoo vehicles was to be filled by contract manufacturer VDL Nedcar while Canoo was completing its "Mega Micro" factory in Pryor, Oklahoma, but Canoo later announced that early low-volume production will occur at its Bentonville, Arkansas headquarters / research & development facility instead.

== Design ==
Compared to the rounded Lifestyle Vehicle (LV) which was the first vehicle announced by Canoo, the MPDV has an angular, faceted style that Dwell has likened to the Tesla Cybertruck. It was designed by Richard Kim, who previously had designed the LV.

=== Platform ===
The Canoo Multi-Purpose Platform that underpins all its vehicles is a skateboard chassis that carries battery modules within the perimeter frame, protected on bottom and top by a belly panel and the vehicle cabin floor; the modules form part of the frame's structure, helping to stiffen it and lowering overall weight by approximately 15% compared to peer designs.

=== Powertrain ===
As initially unveiled, the MPDV1 and MPDV2 shared a single-motor, front-wheel drive arrangement, with the permanent-magnet traction motor providing 200 hp (150 kW) and 236 lb⋅ft (320 N⋅m) of torque.

Three high-voltage traction battery capacities are planned: 40, 60, or 80 kW-hr, with corresponding estimated ranges of 130, 190, or 230 mi (210, 310, or 370 km), respectively, for the MPDV1 on the EPA driving cycle; each range decreases by approximately 40–60 mi (64–97 km) with the bulkier MPDV2 body. The battery modules are composed of cylindrical 2170 battery cells and have the potential to use 4680 battery or pouch cells. With 2170 cells, the energy density is 195 W-hr/kg. The traction battery operates at a nominal 400 V.

Canoo MPDV1 and MPDV2 key specifications
Spec		MPDV1	MPDV2
Cargo volume (Note: aft of bulkhead / in cabin / total)		200 / 30 / 230 ft^{3} (5.66 / 0.85 / 6.51 m^{3})	450 / 50 / 500 ft^{3} (12.7 / 1.4 / 14.2 m^{3})
Curb weight / payload (Note: Based on a gross vehicle weight rating of 5,730 lb (2,600 kg))	(40 kW-hr)	3,750 / 1,980 lb (1,700 / 900 kg)	3,970 / 1,760 lb (1,800 / 800 kg)
Curb weight / payload	(60 kW-hr)	3,970 / 1,760 lb (1,800 / 800 kg)	4,190 / 1,540 lb (1,900 / 700 kg)
Curb weight / payload	(80 kW-hr)	4,190 / 1,540 lb (1,900 / 700 kg)	4,410 / 1,320 lb (2,000 / 600 kg)
Est. Range (Note: using EPA / WLTP driving cycles)	(40 kW-hr)	130 / 170 mi (210 / 270 km)	90 / 110 mi (140 / 180 km)
Est. Range	(60 kW-hr)	190 / 250 mi (310 / 400 km)	140 / 190 mi (230 / 310 km)
Est. Range	(80 kW-hr)	230 / 300 mi (370 / 480 km)	190 / 250 mi (310 / 400 km)

=== Cargo ===
Cargo volume aft of the front bulkhead is estimated to be 4.6 m^{3} (160 cu ft) for the MPDV1 and 13 m^{3} (460 cu ft) for the MPDV2; maximum payload varies with model and battery capacity, ranging from 1,980 lb (900 kg) for the MPDV1/40 kW-hr to 1,320 lb (600 kg) for the MPDV2/80 kW-hr. The MPDV2 will have an interior ceiling that is 6 ft 6 in (1.98 m) tall, while the ceiling of the MPDV1 will be 5 ft 8 in (1.73 m) instead.
