= Richard Kim (car designer) =

Korean-American car designer (born 1981)

Richard Kim (born 1981) is a Korean-American car designer, known for his work on the BMW i3 and i8 electric cars. He joined Canoo in 2017 as Chief Design Officer and Co-Founder.

== Career ==
Kim obtained a degree in Transportation Design from Art Center College of Design in California in 2004 and later taught as a faculty instructor from 2008-15.

In 2016, Kim was the subject of controversy after he claimed design authorship over his home without crediting the building's architect.

He has worked as a designer for BMW Designworks USA and BMW Project i in Munich from 2005 to 2012. He then worked at GM Hollywood and VW/Audi group Santa Monica and subsequently left in 2015 to join start-up car company Faraday Future which he left in December 2017. He worked at Faraday Future as VP of Design, Branding, UIUX, and Experiential.

Prior to working at BMW he spent time with Nissan Design Europe and VW Group in Simi Valley and Barcelona.

=== Notable designs ===
- BMW X1 (E84) (exterior designer)
- BMW i3 concept (exterior designer)
- BMW i3 production
- BMW i8 concept
- BMW i8 Spyder
- Faraday Future FFZER01 concept
- Faraday Future FF 91
- LeSee Pro concept
- Canoo
- Canoo MPDV
- Canoo Pickup Truck
