= Tony Aquila =

American businessman

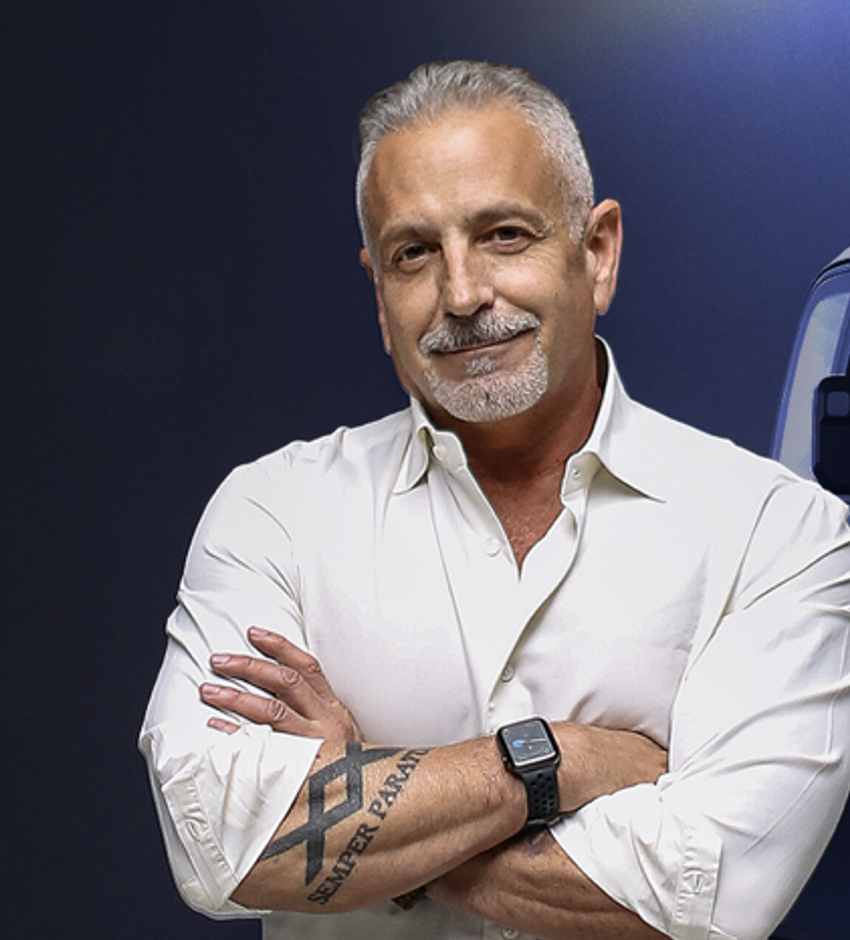
- Born: Anthony Aquila; Richmond, CA
- Occupations: Chairman and CEO of Canoo Inc. Founder, chairman, and CEO of AFV Partners LLC
- Employer(s): Canoo Technologies, Inc.
- Awards: National EY Entrepreneur Of The Year™ 2013 Technology Award winner

Anthony Aquila is an entrepreneur in the United States. He was the Chairman and CEO of Canoo Technologies before its bankruptcy in January 2025.

Aquila has Italian and Lebanese roots.

In 2005, Aquila launched Solera Holdings, an automotive technology company. He took Solera public through a $1 billion IPO in 2007 and private again in 2016, at a valuation of $6.5 billion. During his tenure as CEO, Solera significantly expanded market share and completed a number of acquisitions.

== Early life ==
Aquila was born in Richmond, California, to an immigrant and military family. After dropping out of high school, Aquila worked at his uncle's body shop sweeping floors and replacing windshields.

== Business career ==
=== Canoo Technologies, Inc. ===
Tony Aquila was an initial investor in Canoo, before becoming a member of the Board. He was named Board Chair in October, 2020, and CEO in March 2021. Utilizing their Multi-Purpose Platform, they planned to build multiple variants of vehicles, MPDV (Multi Purpose Delivery Vehicle), and upcoming Canoo Sports Vehicle. The LV was planned for production in late 2022. The MPDV, Truck, and Sports Car were planned for 2023, 2024, and 2025 respectively. Under an agreement established in November 2020, Canoo reimbursed Aquila Family Ventures, a company owned by Canoo's CEO, for the use of a private aircraft, with expenditures amounting to $1.7 million in 2023, surpassing the company’s $886,000 in revenue for that year. Additionally, Canoo compensated Aquila Family Ventures for shared services support at its Justin, Texas, corporate office, totaling another $1.7 million in 2023, as detailed in regulatory filings. Under Aquila's management, the Canoo stock fell over 90%. In January 2025, Canoo filed for Chapter 7 bankruptcy.

=== Solera Holdings, Inc. ===
Since founding the company in 2005, Aquila served as the chairman and CEO of Solera Holdings until his departure in May 2019. In November 2018, the Solera Board formally reprimanded Aquila for his conduct and policy violations and directed remedial measures. He left Solera in 2019, and later sued them for breach of contract, though the lawsuit was ultimately tossed out of court. In court filings, Solera claimed Aquila was fired for cause, that he charged the company for private jet flights that were for his personal use, and that his “brash, vulgar, and belittling comments to colleagues resulted in … significant personnel turnover, including in the executive ranks.”

=== Mitchell International, Inc. ===
Aquila is the former president and chief operating officer of Mitchell International, Inc., a company that provides claims estimating and communications software to insurance carriers. Aquila joined Mitchell in 2001 after it had acquired Ensera.

=== Ensera, Inc. ===
Aquila was founder and CEO of Ensera, Inc., a claims workflow software company for the vehicle insurance and collision industry.

=== MaxMeyer America, Inc. ===
Prior to Ensera, Aquila was founder and CEO of MaxMeyer America, Inc. (a subsidiary of MaxMeyer Duco, SPA, Italy), an importer and distributor of European automotive refinishing products. In 1997, PPG Industries acquired MaxMeyer Duco, SPA.
