= Canoo =

Bankrupt American electric vehicle manufacturer

Canoo Inc.
- Formerly: Evelozcity (2017–2019)
- Type: Public
- Traded as: OTC Pink: GOEVQ
- Industry: Automotive
- Founded: 2017; 9 years ago
- Founders: Stefan Krause; Ulrich Kranz
- Defunct: January 17, 2025
- Fate: Bankruptcy and Liquidation
- Headquarters: Torrance, California, US, U.S.
- Key people: Tony Aquila (chairman & CEO)
- Products: Electric vehicles
- Number of employees: 805 (December 31, 2021)
- Website: canoo.com at the Wayback Machine (archived December 25, 2024)

Canoo Inc. was an American automotive company based in Torrance, California, that developed and manufactured electric vehicles. Canoo's research and development team was based in Michigan, in the Detroit region (Auburn Hills, Livonia), and production operations in Justin, Texas. The company had plans to produce commercial electric vehicles such as vans for fleet, vehicle rental, and ride-sharing services. On January 17, 2025, Canoo filed for Chapter 7 bankruptcy.

== History ==
=== Origins as Evelozcity ===
Canoo was founded in 2017 under the name Evelozcity by Stefan Krause and Ulrich Kranz. Krause worked for Deutsche Bank as its chief financial officer while Kranz worked for BMW as a senior executive. Both men had met at rival EV company Faraday Future before leaving together to form their own company in 2017, due to disagreement with Faraday Future's leadership. Krause took on the role of chief executive officer at Evelozcity, and Kranz became chief technology officer. The company received its primary funding from Chinese investor Li Pak-tam and German entrepreneur David Stern.

In April 2018, Evelozcity Canoo hired Karl-Thomas Neumann, the former head of Opel, as a senior executive.

=== Renamed to Canoo ===
In March 2019 Evelozcity was renamed Canoo. In July 2019, Neumann left Canoo, but he remained an investor in the company.

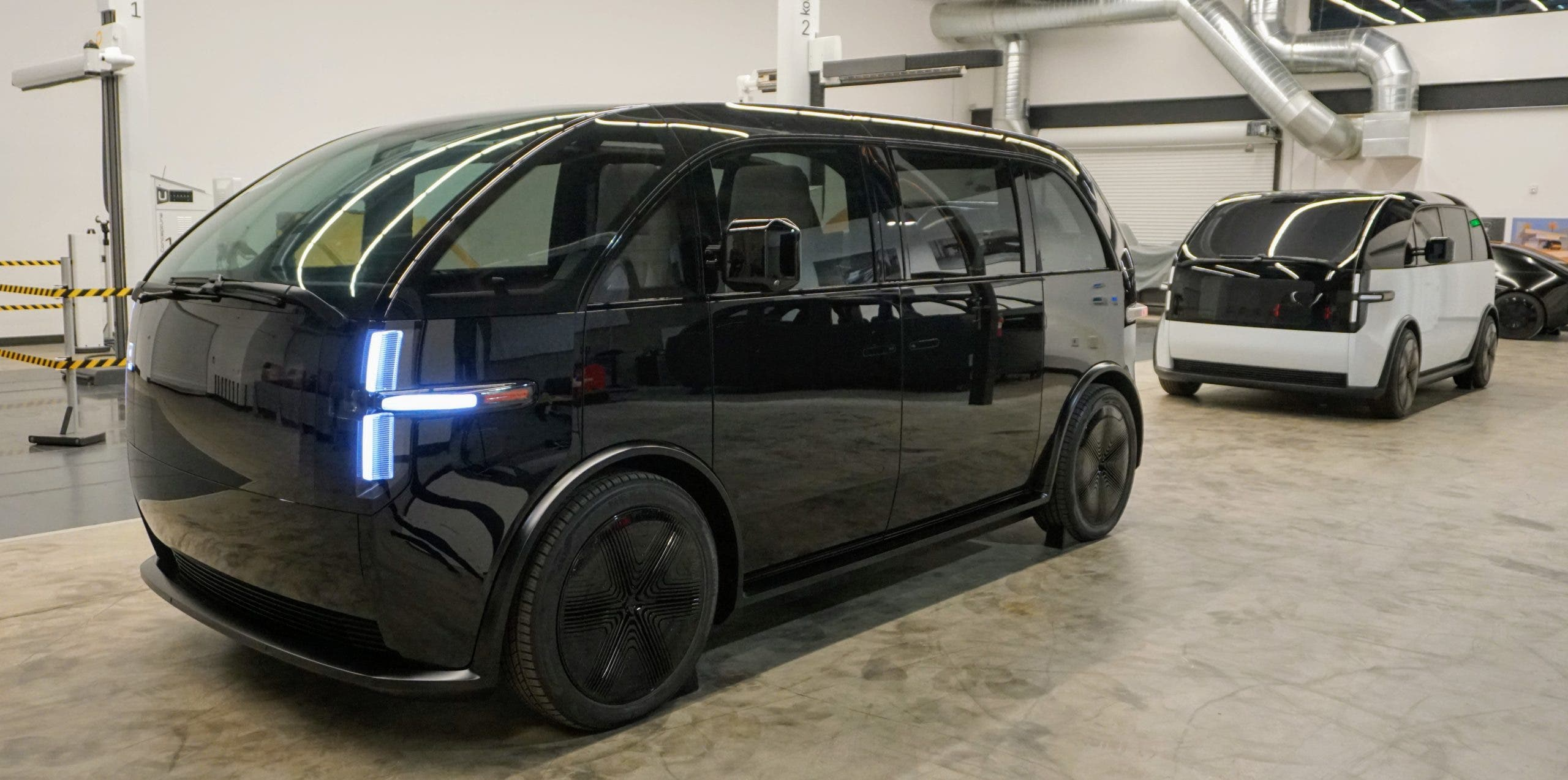
Canoo Lifestyle Vehicles, all-electric minivans

In September 2019, the company presented its first vehicle prototype, the electric van Canoo, which was later renamed to the Canoo Lifestyle Vehicle.

In February 2020, Hyundai Motor Group, the parent company of Hyundai Motors and Kia Motors, announced that the company would partner with Canoo on the joint development of a new electric vehicle platform. The platform would be used for compact vehicles and for fleet vehicles such as shuttles. The deal is part of Hyundai's Strategy 2025 program which will see Hyundai investing US$87 billion for five years starting in 2020.

In July 2020, co-founder Stefan Krause left the company. He had previously taken an extended leave of absence in August 2019 for family reasons. Co-founder Ulrich Kranz assumed the role of permanent CEO upon Krause's departure. Also in July 2020, Canoo was featured on the TV program Jay Leno's Garage.

=== Going public ===
In September 2020, Canoo announced a merger with the special-purpose acquisition company Hennessy Capital Acquisition Corp. IV., intending to list Canoo on the NASDAQ valued at $2.4 billion. The expectation was to raise $300 million to help finance the production of the Canoo minivan, planned for launch in 2022. On December 22, 2020, Canoo completed its merger with Hennessy Capital Acquisition Corp IV.

A few days before its stock exchange debut, the company announced its MPDV (Multi-Purpose Delivery Vehicle) product line. The entry-level van was expected to sell for $33,000 on arrival in limited quantities in 2022, ramping up to volume production in 2023.

In mid-January 2021, The Verge reported that in the first half of 2020 Canoo had been in talks with Apple for a potential role in its secretive Titan car project.

On March 11, 2021, Canoo announced the Canoo Pickup Truck, an electric pickup set to release in 2023. Canoo announced plans to offer both single-motor and dual-motor all-wheel drive options for their pickup truck, with the latter being capable of producing 600 hp (450 kW) and 550 foot-pounds (750 J) of torque. The company said that the truck would have over 200 miles (320 km) of range and a 1,800 lb (820 kg) payload capacity. After the announcement, shares of the company rose by 14%.

It was announced in March 2021 that Canoo had terminated its partnership with Hyundai Motor Group due to a change in corporate strategy. The company also announced that it would shift away from vehicle subscriptions to selling commercial vehicles.

=== Executive and location changes ===
On April 22, 2021, the company announced that co-founder and CEO Ulrich Kranz was stepping down and would be replaced by chairman Tony Aquila as CEO. Also in April 2021, the U.S. Securities and Exchange Commission launched an investigation into Canoo after its merger with Hennessy Capital Acquisition Corp. IV due to a string of executive departures, sudden changes to its business model, and class-action lawsuits brought by shareholders.

On June 17, 2021, the company announced they would build a new factory in Pryor, Oklahoma (just outside Tulsa) to manufacture all of its future vehicles. The plant will be used to build "pod-shaped vans it calls 'lifestyle vehicles' beginning in 2023." The same day, Dutch media reported that the Dutch company VDL Nedcar would start producing Canoo Minivans for the European market. Later in the year, Canoo and VDL ended the manufacturing agreement. Following receipt of orders in October 2022, Canoo announced plans for construction of a vehicle battery production facility at the MidAmerica Industrial Park (MAIP) in Pryor, Oklahoma. This was in addition to its earlier announcement of plans for a vehicle production plant at MAIP capable of producing 300,000 vehicles per year.

On November 15, 2021, the company announced it would move its headquarters to Bentonville, Arkansas and establish a manufacturing plant there. In January 2022, Canoo entered into a 10-year US$17.7 million lease for a building in Bentonville, which was planned to be an "advanced industrialization facility" for low-volume manufacturing. In August 2022, Canoo disclosed they had contracted with a third party for their initial vehicle production. That December, the company still listed Torrance, California as its headquarters, although later coverage showed the headquarters had moved to Justin, Texas by 2024. As of May 2024, the Bentonville facility appeared to be closed with a "Warehouse for Sublease" sign posted outside.

In May 2022, it was reported that Canoo was struggling to find funding, the company saying that it had only enough funding to operate for one more quarter. It was also revealed around the same time that Canoo was suing investor Li Pak-Tim, claiming he was selling shares improperly.

In late November 2022, Canoo announced an agreement to purchase an existing 630,000 ft^{2} (59,000 m^{2}) plant in Oklahoma City to start vehicle production by 2023, before the completion of its micro megafactory in Pryor.

In December 2022, the company sued several former executives for stealing Canoo's trade secrets and poaching talent for their new business, competing EV startup Harbinger Motors.

In April 2023, the company announced that battery production would commence at Pryor to fulfill a United States Department of Defense contract; and, while vehicle manufacturing was to start in Oklahoma City before the end of 2023, long range plans still included vehicle assembly at Pryor because the OKC facility would not meet full production needs. The Oklahoma City plant transaction was completed on April 7, 2023; the plant was formerly owned and operated by Terex. For 2023, Canoo reported US$886,000 (equivalent to $936,200 in 2025) in net revenue after delivering 22 vehicles; expenses paid to CEO Aquila's company for private aircraft and shared services were nearly four times that amount, as noted in the annual earnings report.

=== Demise and bankruptcy ===
In March 2024, Canoo acquired assets from rival EV startup Arrival after it went bankrupt. A disappointing earnings forecast of US$50–100 million for 2024 sent the stock price down.

In August 2024, Canoo co-founder and chief technology officer Sohel Merchant left the company and Canoo announced it was moving its operations out of Los Angeles.

In December 2024, the company announced it was furloughing 82 employees in Oklahoma and idling its factory while in "advanced discussions with various capital sources" to raise emergency funding.

On January 17, 2025, Canoo filed for Chapter 7 bankruptcy in the United States bankruptcy court for Delaware, where Canoo was incorporated. The company blamed a heavy loss in cash and failure to seek funding as contributions to the filing. As a result, Canoo ceased operations immediately after the announcement, while the court appointed a trustee to administer asset liquidation and the distribution of remaining proceeds to creditors. Canoo had less than $50,000 in assets when the company declared Chapter 7 bankruptcy. On March 5, 2025, it was reported that Canoo's CEO, Anthony Aquila, offered to buy almost all of the company's assets for $4 million in cash.

== Vehicles ==
- Canoo LV (announced Sep 2019)
- Canoo MPDV
- Canoo Pickup Truck (announced Mar 2021)

=== Firm orders ===
On April 13, 2022, NASA selected Canoo to supply crew transportation vehicles for its Artemis program, with a total contract value of $147,855. In total 3 vehicles, used to transport astronauts to the launch pad, were supplied to NASA before Canoo's bankruptcy. These vehicles were Canoo Lifestyle Vehicles tailored and painted for NASA use.

In July 2022, Walmart entered into a definitive agreement to purchase 4,500 all-electric Lifestyle Delivery Vehicles (LDV) from Canoo, with an option to buy up to 10,000 in the future. Under the terms, Walmart can terminate the agreement for convenience upon 30 days notice.

Canoo announced two major orders in mid-October 2022. Zeeba, a relatively unknown fleet leasing operation, also based in Greater Los Angeles, ordered a combination of 5,450 LDVs and Lifestyle Vehicles (LV), with a binding commitment of 3,000 by 2024. Some days later, Canoo announced its biggest sale to date, an order from Kingbee, a Utah-based work-ready van fleet rental company. In addition to the binding order of 9,300 LDVs, Kingbee has the option to double the order. Kingbee outfits its vans for fleet customers in construction trades (electrical, plumbing, energy), delivery, and mobile health.

In January 2024, Canoo announced the Postal Service (USPS) order for six right-hand-drive LDV vans.

As of October 2024, fewer than 12 vehicles had been delivered from all orders, appearing to be samples, not regular production.
