= Autodata =

British automotive data and software company

Autodata Ltd.
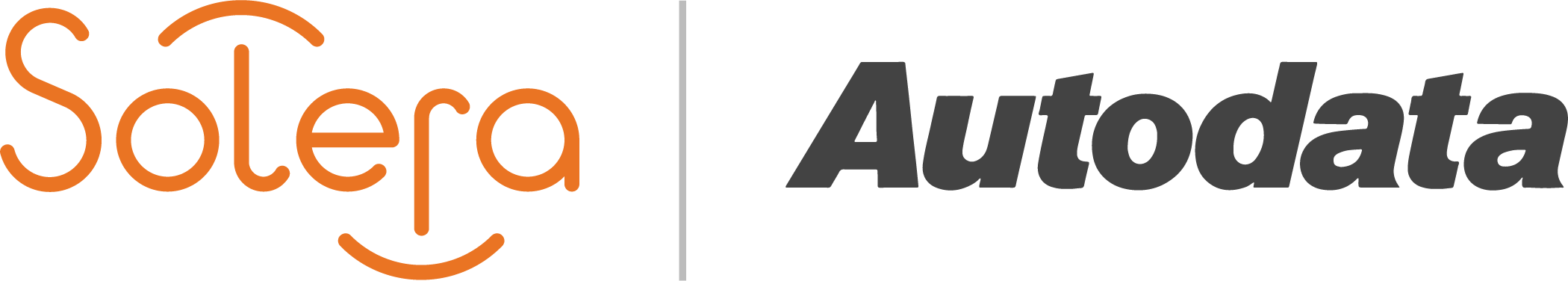

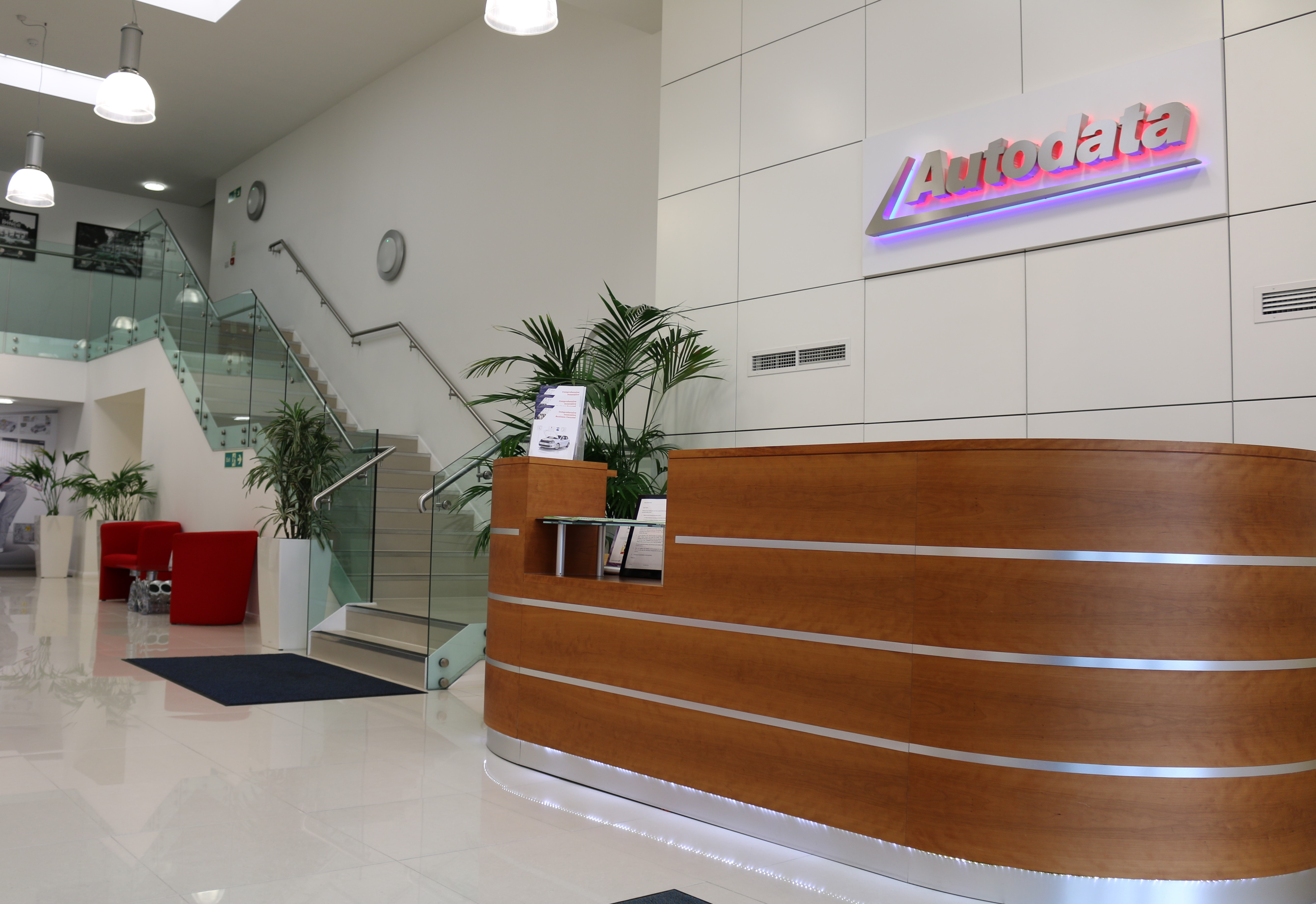
- Company type: Subsidiary
- Industry: Automotive data; Software
- Founded: July 1972; 52 years ago
- Headquarters: Capitol House, Bond Court, Leeds, United Kingdom
- Products: Autodata for Cars & Vans; Autodata for Motorcycles; Autodata API
- Number of employees: 200-500
- Parent: Solera Holdings Inc. (from 2017)
- Website: autodata-group.com

Autodata Limited is a British multinational that specialises in automotive data and software. Autodata provides automotive technical information to professionally service, maintain, and repair cars, light commercial vehicles, and motorcycles. It's best known for providing the automotive aftermarket with OE manufacturer data.

== History ==
Autodata was established in 1972 in Maidenhead, Berkshire, in the UK, producing printed car manuals for owners and enthusiasts to work on their own vehicles. These publications became popular during the 1970s and 1980s, allowing the business to expand internationally.

Although the owners’ manuals continued to be printed up until early 1990s, Autodata had already started to focus the business towards the professional market, producing numerous publications for workshops and garages. Instead of focusing on one vehicle with each book, the books would cover hundreds of vehicles, but for one task or item, such as carburettors or replacing timing belts. This soon led to Autodata growing internationally, with the professional technical data and guidance becoming used across Europe, the United States and Australasia.

In 1991 Autodata produced its first electronic media in the form of workshop technical information on floppy disk. This soon moved to CD, which continued in production until 2014.

In 2004 Autodata Australia Limited was founded to support the increasing interest and operations across Australia and New Zealand. This allowed for much more focus on the research and development of region specific products.

In 2006, alongside the CD product, Autodata launched its first online product to accommodate for the rate of change and increased complexity within automotive technology.

In 2007 Autodata Germany was created, employing permanent staff near Stuttgart. This also became an important hub for the company with many OEM (Original equipment manufacturer) organisations based in the region.

Autodata France was created in 2011, with offices just outside Bordeaux, to support what was becoming one of the biggest country-specific markets for Autodata. In 2015 Autodata France included a new company set-up, as Autodata purchased one of its biggest distributors in Europe, SFTA.

In May 2014, with much interest, Autodata was purchased by Bowmark Capital and Five Arrows for £150 million. In the same year Autodata opened access to a new API (Application programming interface) based product, allowing organisations to build their own solutions, powered by the databases of Autodata.This was further developed, until being officially launched in 2016. in 2014 also officially launched a new online system, largely powered by their own API product.

In 2015 Autodata moved all customer using older online and CD product onto the new online system.

In 2016 Autodata expanded further by purchasing its official distributor in Finland and the Baltic region; Autodata OY.
