= BMW i8 =

Plug-in hybrid sports car developed by BMW

BMW i8 (I12/I15)
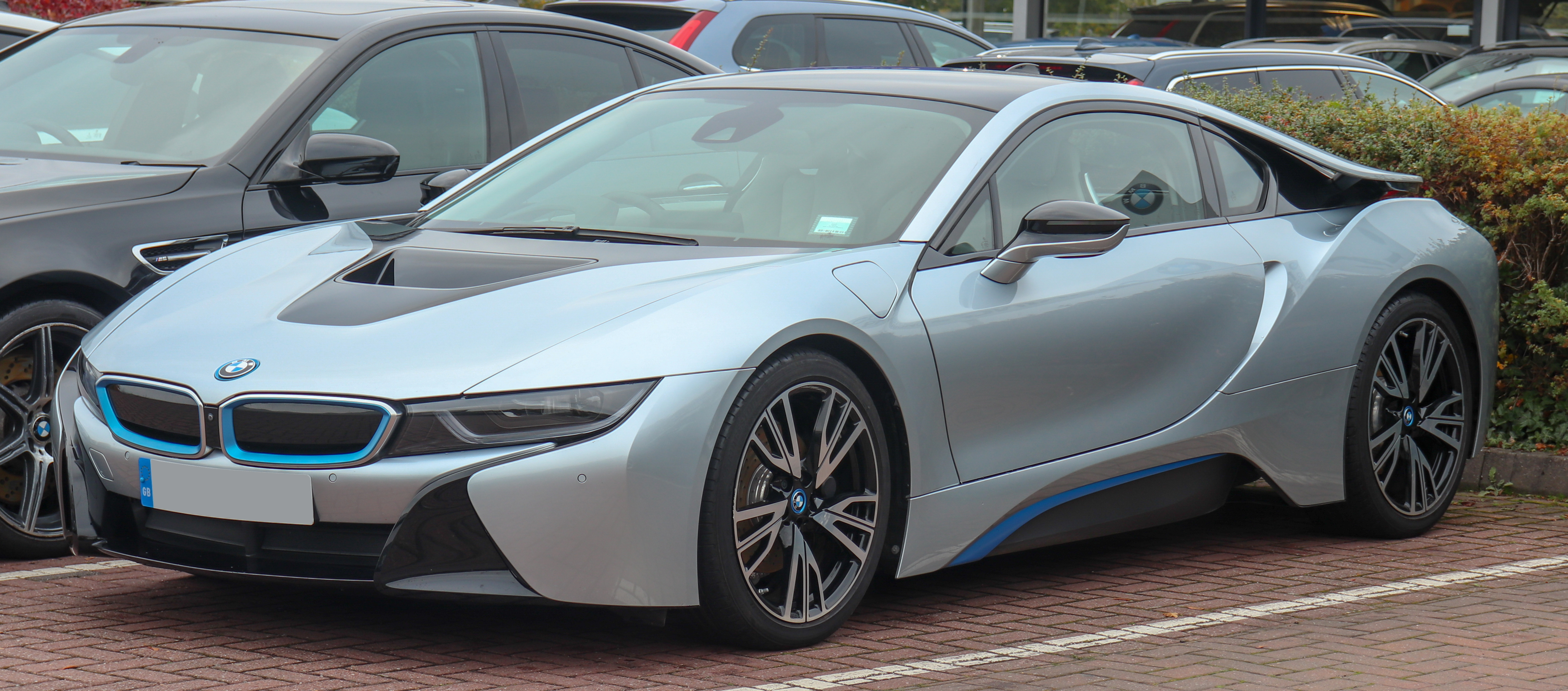

Overview
- Manufacturer: BMW
- Production: April 2014 – June 2020 (20,465 units)
- Model years: 2014–2020
- Assembly: Germany: Saxony, Leipzig (BMW Group Plant Leipzig)
- Designer: Vision EfficientDynamics; Benoit Jacob (production i8); Richard Kim (2011 i8 Concept)

Body and chassis
- Class: Sports car (S)
- Body style: 2-door coupé 2-door roadster
- Layout: Transverse mid-engine, all-wheel-drive
- Doors: Butterfly doors
- Related: BMW i3

Powertrain
- Engine: B38K15T0 1.5L turbocharged I3 engine gasoline
- Electric motor: 98 kW (131 hp)
- Power output: 275 kW (369 hp)
- Transmission: Aisin F21-360 FT EOP Transverse 6-Speed Automatic Transmission
- Hybrid drivetrain: Plug-in hybrid
- Battery: 7.1 kWh lithium-ion battery 11.6 kWh lithium-ion battery for 2018–2020 model years
- Range: 500 km (311 mi) in Comfort mode (NEDC); 600 km (370 mi) in Eco Pro mode (NEDC); 530 km (330 mi) (EPA)
- Electric range: 37 km (23 mi) (NEDC); 24 km (15 mi) (EPA); 53–55 km (33–34 mi) (NEDC) for 2018 – 2020 model years 29 km (18 mi) (EPA) for 2019 – 2020 model years

Dimensions
- Wheelbase: 2,800 mm (110.2 in)
- Length: 4,689 mm (184.6 in)
- Width: 1,942 mm (76.5 in)
- Height: 1,298 mm (51.1 in)
- Curb weight: 1,539 kg (3,394 lb)

Chronology
- Predecessor: BMW Vision EfficientDynamics (concept)

The BMW i8 is a plug-in hybrid sports car developed by BMW. The i8 was part of BMW's electrified fleet and was marketed under the BMW i sub-brand. The production version of the BMW i8 was unveiled at the 2013 Frankfurt Motor Show and was released in Germany in June 2014. Deliveries to retail customers in the U.S. began in August 2014. A roadster variant was launched in May 2018. Production ended in June 2020.

The 2015 i8 could accelerate from 0 to 100 km/h (62 mph) in 4.4 seconds and had an electronically limited top speed of 250 km/h (155 mph). The 2015 model year i8 had a 7.1-kWh lithium-ion battery pack that delivered an all-electric range of 37 km (23 mi) under the New European Driving Cycle. Under the U.S. EPA cycle, the range in EV mode was 24 km (15 mi). The battery capacity of both the BMW i8 Roadster and the i8 Coupe was increased to 11.6 kWh in 2018, allowing the NEDC electric range to rise to 55 km (34 mi) for the coupé and 53 km (33 mi) for the roadster.

The i8 coupé had a fuel efficiency of 2.1 L/100 km (134.5 mpg_{‑imp}; 112.0 mpg_{‑US}) under the NEDC test with carbon emissions of 49 g/km. The EPA rated the i8 combined fuel economy at 76 MPGe (2.1 L gasoline-equivalent/100 km; 91 mpg_{-imp} gasoline-equivalent) and 29 miles per gallon (6.7L/100 km) when running in pure gasoline mode.

== History ==
Previewed by the Vision EfficientDynamics concept car, the i8 was part of BMW's "Project i" and was marketed as a new brand, BMW i, sold separately from BMW or Mini. The BMW i3, launched for customers in Europe in the fourth quarter of 2013, was the first model of the i brand available in the market, and it was followed by the i8, released in Germany in June 2014 as a 2015 model year. Other i models were expected to follow.

The turbodiesel concept car was unveiled at the 2009 International Motor Show Germany, In 2010, BMW announced the mass production of the Vision EfficientDynamics concept in Leipzig beginning in 2013 as the BMW i8. The BMW i8 gasoline-powered concept car destined for production was unveiled at the 2011 Frankfurt Motor Show. The production version of the BMW i8 was unveiled at the 2013 International Motor Show Germany. The following are the concept and pre-production models developed by BMW that preceded the production version. When BMW i sponsored the ABB FIA Formula E World Championship, they announced that they would provide support vehicles; the i8 operated as the official safety car.

=== BMW Vision EfficientDynamics (2009) ===
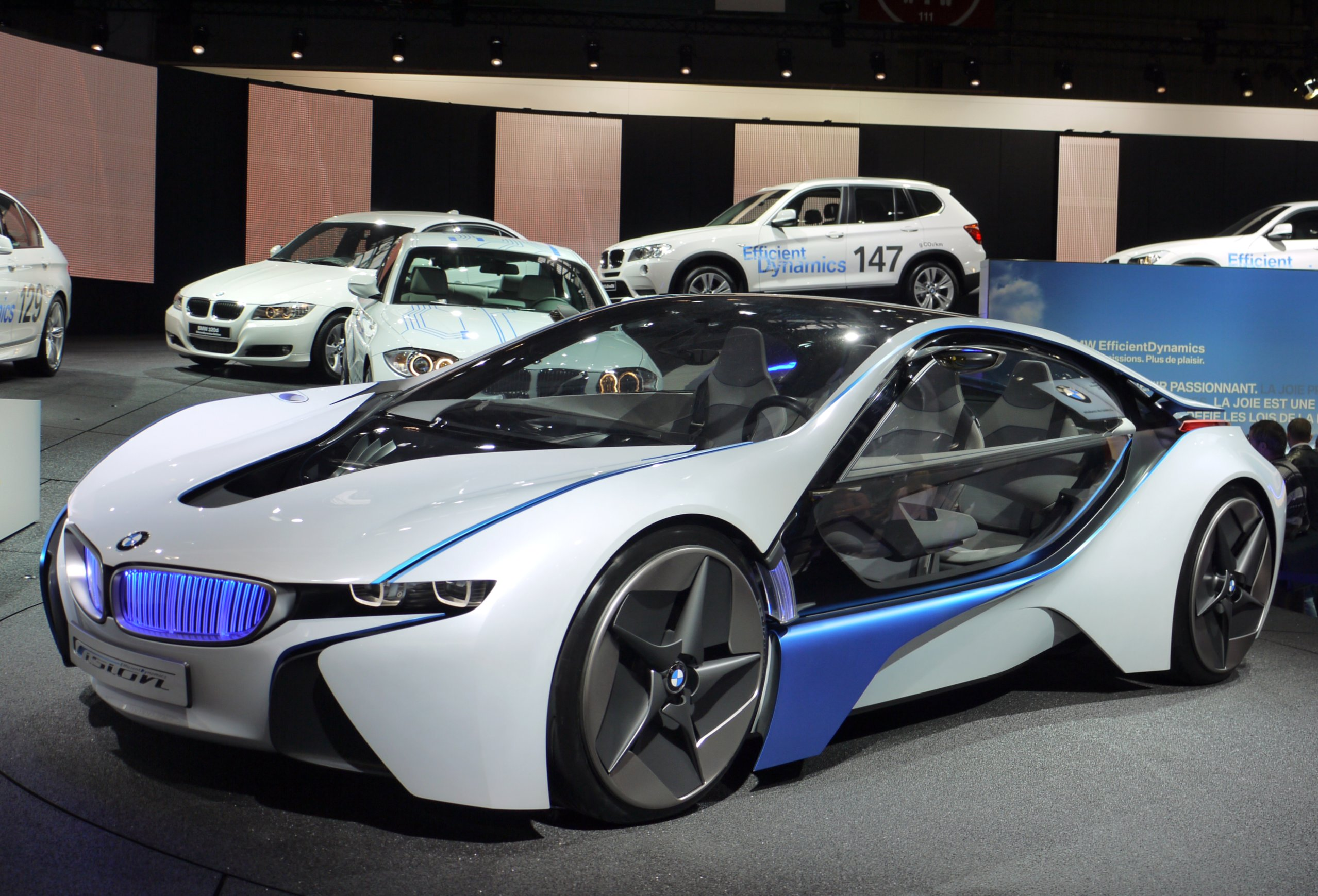
Vision EfficientDynamics concept vehicle at the 2010 Paris Motor Show

The BMW Vision EfficientDynamics was a plug-in hybrid concept car with a 1.5L three-cylinder turbo-diesel engine. Additionally, there were two electric motors with 104 kW (139 hp). It allowed for acceleration from 0 to 100 km/h (62 mph) in 4.8 seconds, with an electronically limited top speed of 250 km/h (155 mph).

According to BMW, the average fuel consumption in the EU test cycle (KV01) was 3.76 L/100 km (75.1 mpg_{‑imp}), with a carbon dioxide emission rating of 99 grams per kilometer (1,3 L/100 km and 33g CO_{2}/kabelham; EU-PHEV ECE-R101). The estimated all-electric range was 50 km (31 mi), and the 24-liter petrol tank extended the total vehicle range to up to 700 km (430 mi). The lightweight chassis was made mainly from aluminum. The windshield, top, doors, and fenders were made from polycarbonate glass, with the body having a drag coefficient of 0.22.

The designers of the BMW Vision EfficientDynamics concept were Mario Majdandzic for the exterior and Jochen Paesen (lead interior design), Markus Speck (interior design), and Felix Staudacher former Baerlin (detail design) for the interior. While Jochen Paesen took care of the main interior theme, Markus Speck was in charge of the seats, all the visible structure, and some details. Felix Baerlin supported Jochen Paesen on details including the steering wheel and center console.

The vehicle was unveiled at the 2009 International Motor Show Germany, followed by Auto China 2010.

=== BMW i8 Concept (2011) ===
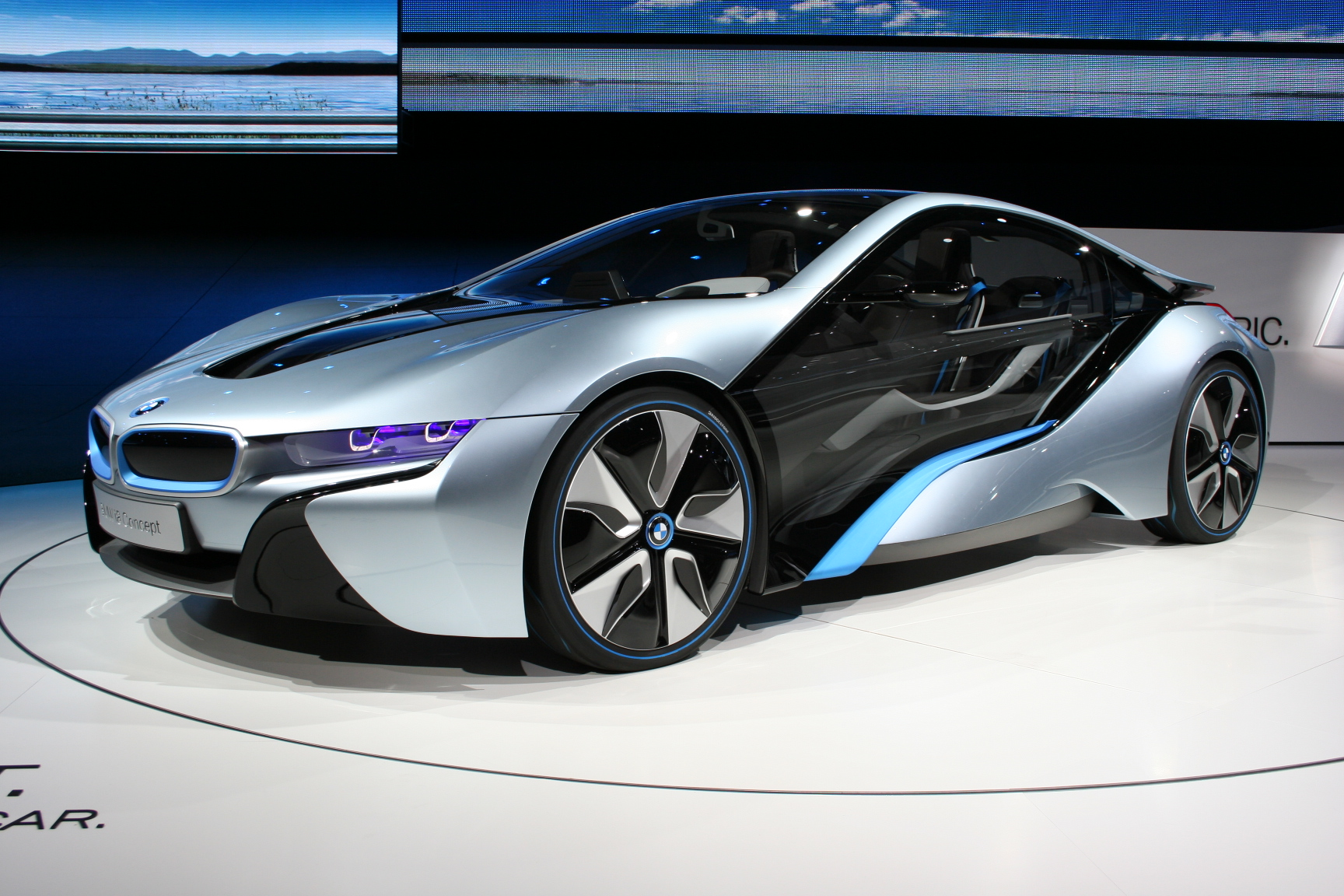
BMW i8 Concept exhibited at the 2011 International Motor Show Germany.

The BMW i8 Concept plug-in hybrid electric vehicle included an electric motor located in the front axle powering the front wheels rated at 96 kW (131 PS; 129 hp) and 250 N⋅m (184 ft⋅lb), a turbocharged 1.5-liter 3-cylinder gasoline engine driving rear wheels rated at 164 kW (223 PS; 220 hp) and 300 N⋅m (221 ft⋅lb) of torque, with a combined output of 260 kW (354 PS; 349 hp) and 550 N⋅m (406 ft⋅lb), a 7.2 kWh (26 MJ) lithium-ion battery pack that allowed an all-electric range of 35 km (22 mi). All four wheels provided regenerative braking. The location of the battery pack in the energy tunnel gave the vehicle a low centre of gravity, enhancing its dynamics. Its top speed was electronically limited to 250 km/h (155 mph) and was expected to go from 0 to 100 km/h (0 to 60 mph) in 4.6 seconds. Under normal driving conditions the i8 was expected to deliver 80 mpg_{‑US} (2.9 L/100 km; 96 mpg_{‑imp}) under the European cycle. A full charge of the battery would take less than two hours at 220 V. The positioning of the motor and engine over the axles resulted in 50/50 weight distribution.

The vehicle was unveiled at the 2011 International Motor Show Germany, followed by CENTER 548 in New York City, 42nd Tokyo Motor Show 2011, 82nd Geneva Motor Show 2012, BMW i Born Electric Tour at the Palazzo Delle Esposizioni at Via Nazionale 194 in Rome, and Auto Shanghai 2013.

This concept car was featured in the film Mission: Impossible – Ghost Protocol.

=== BMW i8 Concept Spyder (2012) ===
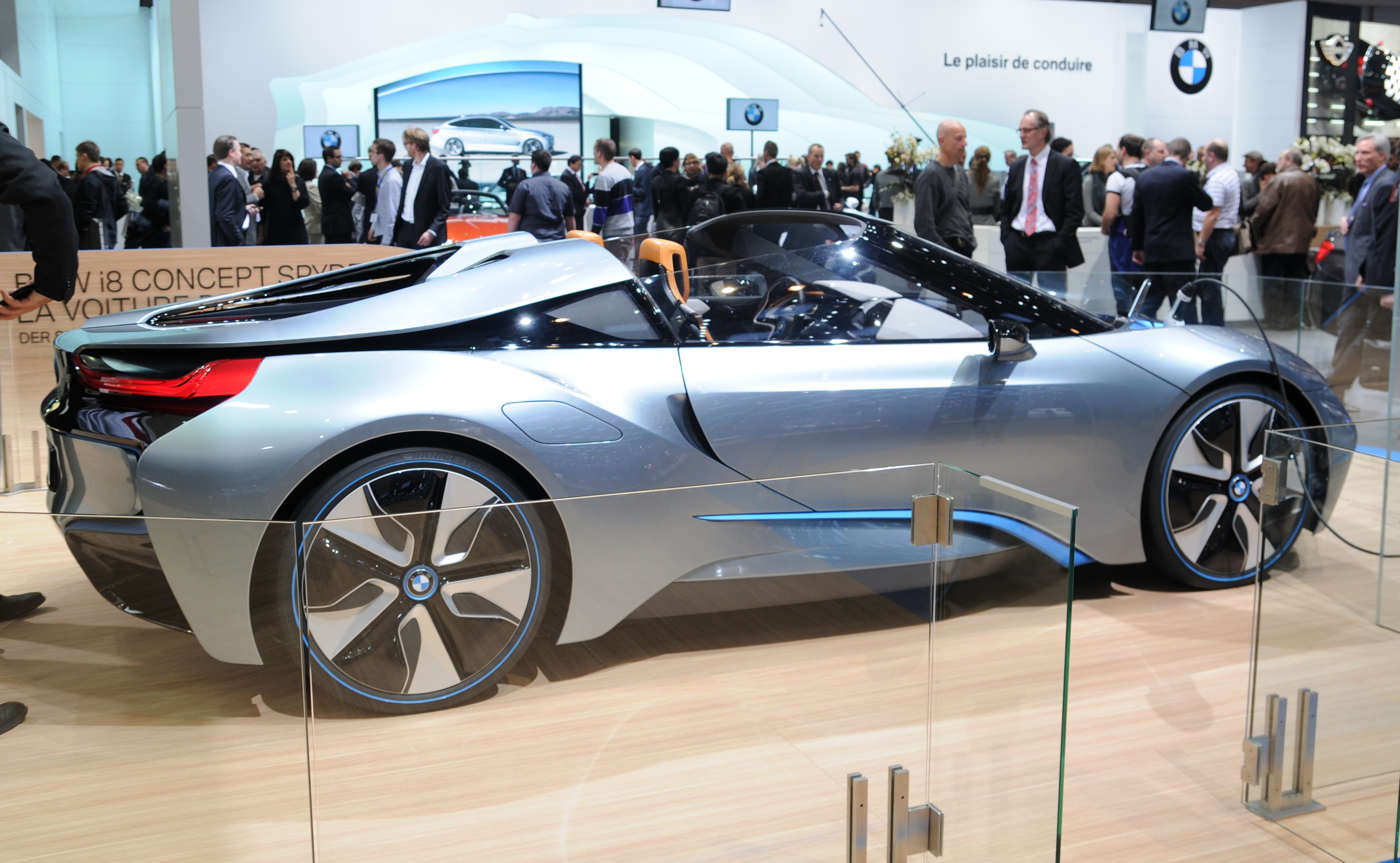
BMW i8 Concept Spyder

The BMW i8 Concept Spyder included a slightly shorter wheelbase and overall length compared to the BMW i8 Concept, carbon-fiber-reinforced plastic (CFRP) Life module, drive modules made primarily from aluminum components, interlocking of surfaces and lines, 8.8-inch (220 mm) screen display, off-white outer layer, and orange-toned naturally tanned leather upholstery.

The vehicle was unveiled at Auto China 2012 in Beijing where it won Concept Car of the Year, followed by the 83rd Geneva International Motor Show 2013. The designer of the BMW i8 Concept Spyder was Richard Kim.

=== BMW i8 coupe prototype (2013) ===
The design of the BMW i8 coupe prototype was based on the BMW i8 Concept. The BMW i8 prototype had an average fuel efficiency of less than 2.5 L/100 km (113.0 mpg_{‑imp}; 94.1 mpg_{‑US}) under the New European Driving Cycle with carbon emissions of less than 59 g/km. The i8 with its carbon-fibre-reinforced plastic (CFRP) passenger cell, lightweight, aerodynamically optimized body, and BMW eDrive technology offered an expected 0–100 km/h (0–62 mph) sprint time of less than 4.5 seconds using both power sources. The plug-in hybrid system of the BMW i8 comprised a three-cylinder, 1.5-liter BMW TwinPower Turbo gasoline engine combined with BMW eDrive technology used in the BMW i3 and developed maximum power of 170 kW (228 hp). The BMW i8 was the first BMW production model to be powered by a three-cylinder gasoline engine and the resulting specific output of 115 kW (154 hp) per liter of displacement was the highest of any engine produced by the BMW Group.

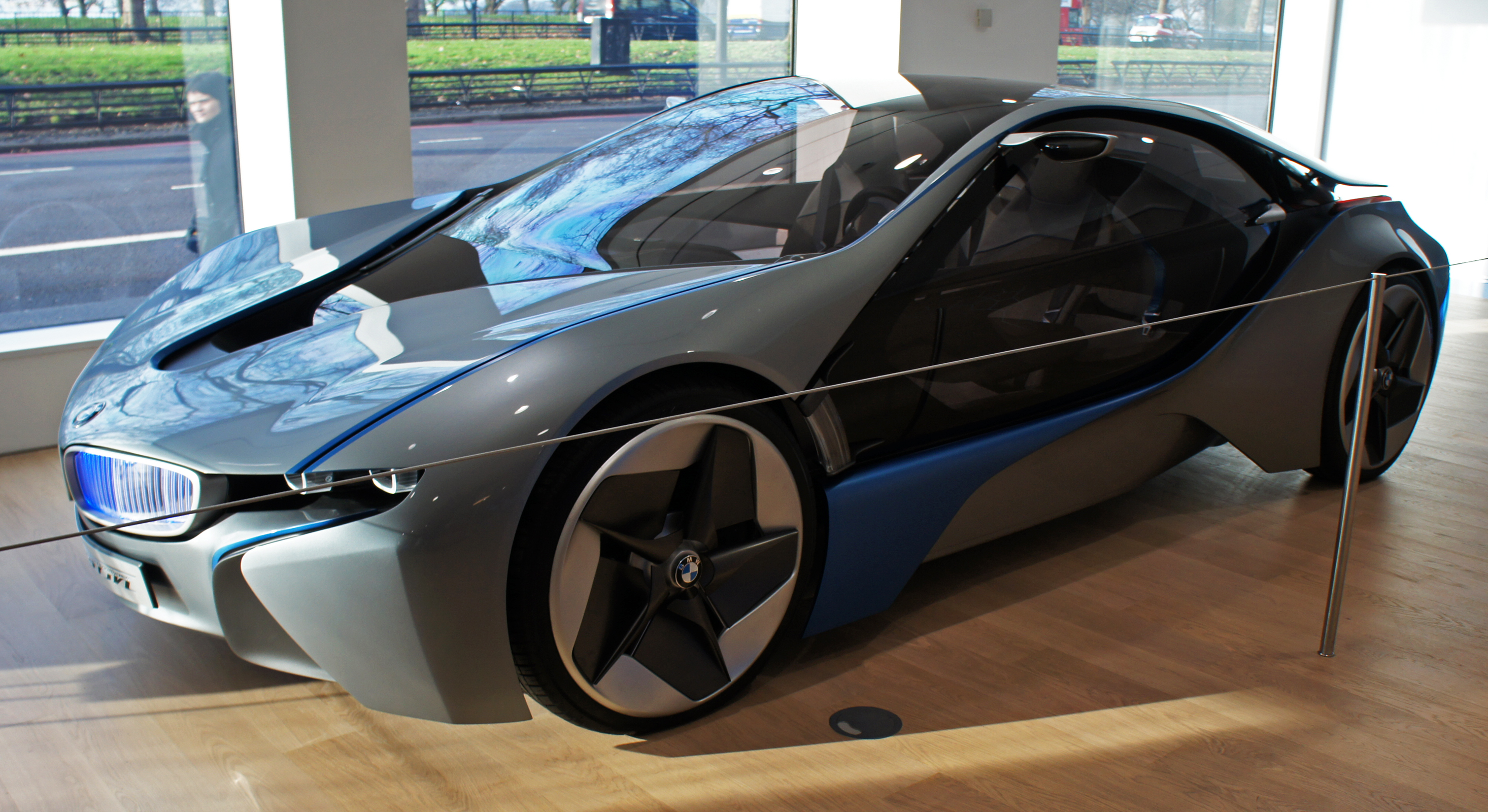
BMW Vision Efficient Dynamics concept exhibited at the BMW i store in Park Lane, London.

The BMW i8's second power source was a hybrid synchronous electric motor specially developed and produced by the BMW Group for BMW i. The electric motor developed a maximum power of 98 kW (131 hp) and produced its maximum torque of around 320 N⋅m (236 lbf⋅ft) from a standstill. As well as providing a power boost to assist the gasoline engine during acceleration, the electric motor could also power the vehicle by itself. Top speed in electric mode was approximately 120 km/h (75 mph), with a maximum driving range of up to 35 km (22 mi). The model-specific version of the high-voltage 7.2 lithium-ion battery had a liquid cooling system.

The vehicle was unveiled in BMW Group's Miramas test track in France.

== Production version ==
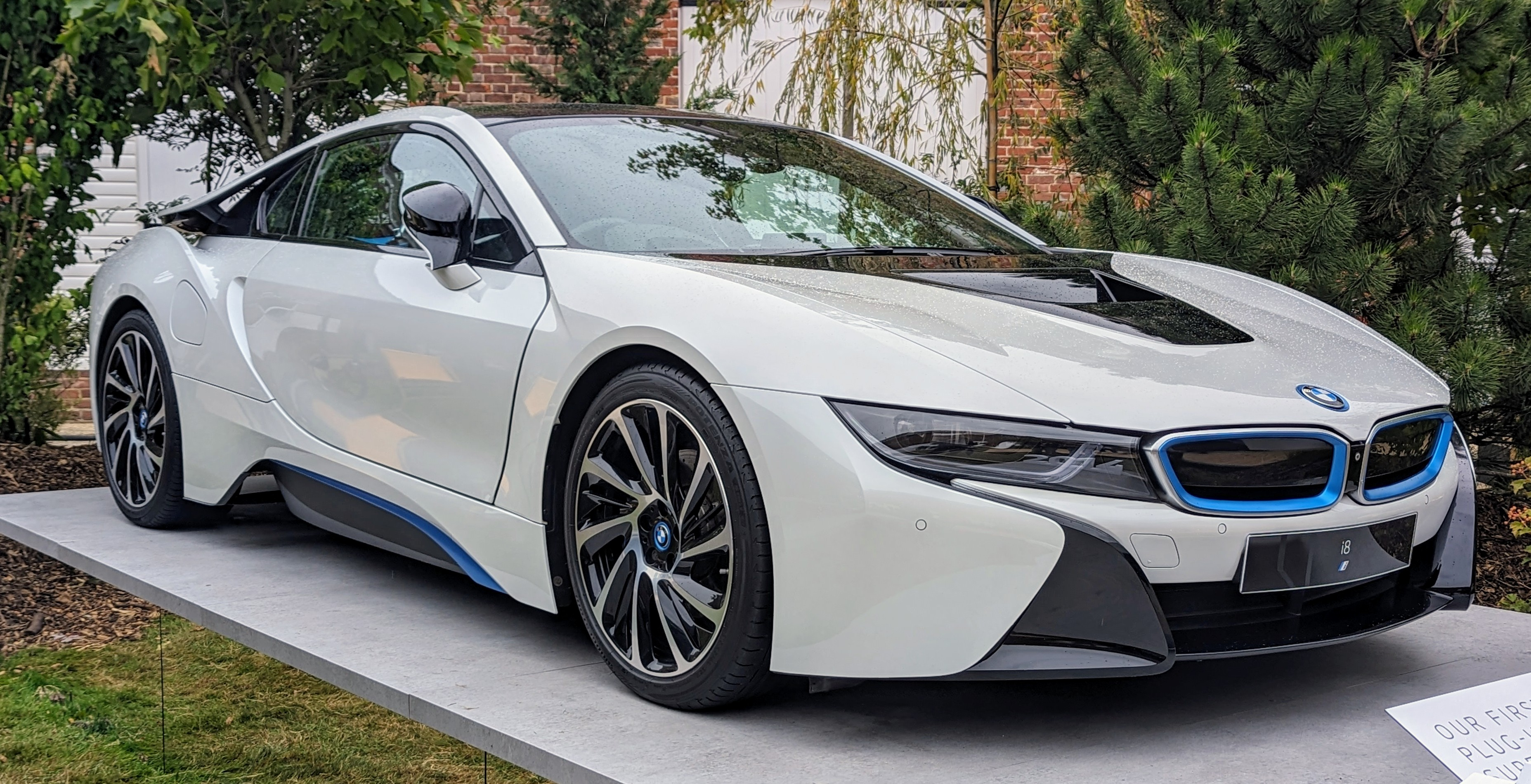
BMW i8 frontal view (production model)

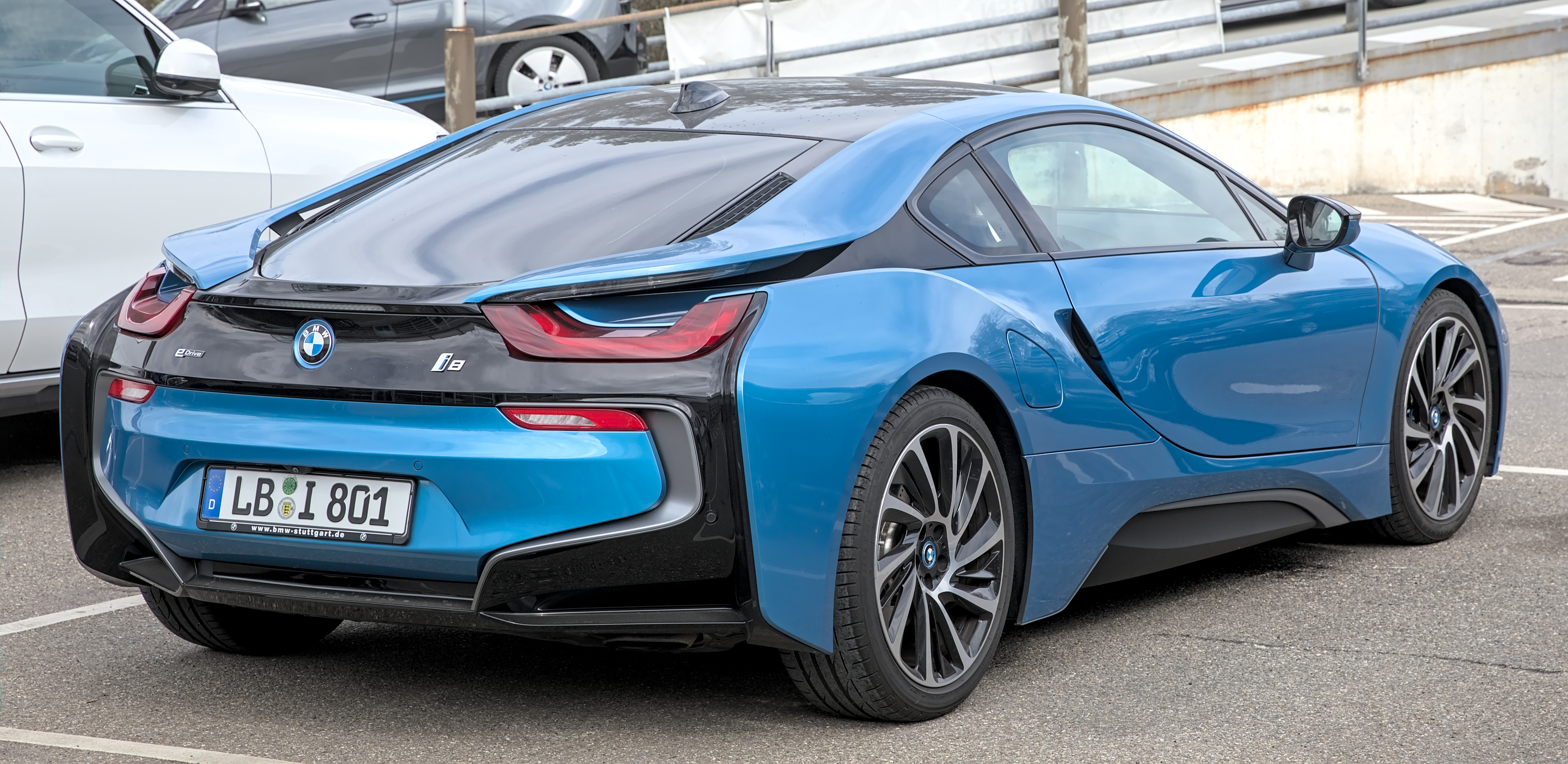
BMW i8 rear view (production model)

The production BMW i8 was designed by Benoit Jacob. The production version was unveiled at the 2013 International Motor Show Germany, followed by 2013 Les Voiles de Saint-Tropez. Its design was heavily influenced by the BMW M1 Homage concept car, which in turn pays homage to BMW's last production mid-engined sports car prior to the i8: the BMW M1.

The BMW i8 featured butterfly doors, head-up display, rear-view cameras and partially false engine noise. Series production of customer vehicles began in April 2014. The electric two-speed drivetrain was developed and produced by GKN. It was the first production car with laser headlights, reaching farther than LED lights.

The i8 had a vehicle weight of 1,485 kg (3,274 lb) (DIN kerb weight) and a low drag coefficient (Cd) of 0.26. In all-electric mode, the BMW i8 had a top speed of 120 km/h (75 mph). In Sport mode, the i8 delivered a mid-range acceleration from 80 to 120 km/h (50 to 75 mph) in 2.6 seconds. The electronically controlled top speed was 250 km/h (155 mph).

The 20,000th i8 was produced in December 2019, one of the limited Ultimate Sophisto Edition models. The last i8 rolled off the production line on 11 June 2020. In total, there were 20,465 units produced: 16,581 coupés and 3,884 roadsters.

=== Range and fuel economy ===
The production i8 had a 7.1 kWh lithium-ion battery pack with a usable capacity of 5.2 kWh and intelligent energy management that delivered an all-electric range of 37 km (23 mi) under the NEDC cycle. Under the EPA cycle, the range in EV mode was 15 mi (24 km), and the total range was 330 mi (530 km).

The production version had a fuel efficiency of 2.1 L/100 km (134.5 mpg_{‑imp}; 112.0 mpg_{‑US}) under the NEDC test with carbon emissions of 49 g/km. Under EPA cycle, the i8 combined fuel economy in EV mode was rated 76 equivalent (MPG-equivalent) (3.1 L gasoline equivalent/100 km; 91 mpg-imp gasoline equivalent), with an energy consumption of 43 kW-hrs/100 mi and gasoline consumption of 0.1 gal_{-US}/100 mi. The combined fuel economy when running only with gasoline (after the battery was drained empty) was 28 mpg_{‑US} (8.4 L/100 km; 34 mpg_{‑imp}) for city driving, and 29 mpg_{‑US} (8.1 L/100 km; 35 mpg_{‑imp}) on the highway.

The U.S. Environmental Protection Agency's 2014 edition of the Light-Duty Automotive Technology, Carbon Dioxide Emissions, and Fuel Economy Trends introduced utility factors for plug-in hybrids to represent the percentage of miles that would be driven using electricity by an average driver, in electric only or blended modes. The BMW i8 Coupé had an EV mode utility factor of 37%, compared with 83% for the BMW i3 REx, 66% for the Chevrolet Volt, 65% for the Cadillac ELR, 45% for the Ford Energi models, 43% for the McLaren P1, 39% for the Porsche Panamera S E-Hybrid, and 29% for the Toyota Prius PHV.

The battery capacity of both models launched in 2018, BMW i8 Roadster and the i8 Coupé, was increased to a gross energy content of 11.6 kWh. This, and other improvements, increased the all-electric range to 55 km (34 mi) for the BMW i8 Coupé and 53 km (33 mi) for the BMW i8 Roadster, both under the NEDC test. Under the U.S. EPA driving cycle, the range only increased from 15 mi (24 km) to 18 mi (29 km).

The following are the BMW i8 U.S. Environmental Protection Agency (EPA) ratings for all-electric range and fuel economy for all variants of the i8 between 2014 and 2020 model years.

BMW i8 EPA ratings
Model	Year model	Fuel/EV range	Combined	City/Highway	Notes
BMW i8 Coupé; BMW i8 Roadster	2019; 2020	Electricity only 18 mi (29 km)	69 mpg-e (49 kW-hrs/100 mi)	-	(Note: The i8 did not use any gasoline for the first 18 miles in EPA tests. It may use gasoline depending on how it is driven.)
BMW i8 Coupé; BMW i8 Roadster	2019; 2020	Gasoline only 320 mi (510 km)	27 mpg	26 mpg/ 29 mpg	(Note: The i8 did not use any gasoline for the first 18 miles in EPA tests. It may use gasoline depending on how it is driven.)
BMW i8	2014; 2015; 2016; 2017	Electricity only 15 mi (24 km)	76 mpg-e (43 kW-hrs/100 mi)	-	(Note: The i8 did not use any gasoline for the first 15 miles in EPA tests. It may use gasoline depending on how it is driven. There was no 2018 MY rated.)
BMW i8	2014; 2015; 2016; 2017	Gasoline only 315 mi (507 km)	28 mpg	28 mpg/ 29 mpg	(Note: The i8 did not use any gasoline for the first 15 miles in EPA tests. It may use gasoline depending on how it is driven. There was no 2018 MY rated.)

=== Engines ===
Years	Type/code	Power	Torque
2014–2018	1,499 cc (91.5 cu in) I3 turbo B38K15T0	231 PS (170 kW; 228 hp) at 5800 rpm	320 N⋅m (236 lb⋅ft) at 3700 rpm
2014–2018	hybrid synchronous motor	131 PS (96 kW; 129 hp)	250 N⋅m (184 lb⋅ft) at 0 rpm
2014–2018	Combined	362 PS (266 kW; 357 hp)	570 N⋅m (420 lb⋅ft) at 3700 rpm
2018–2020	1,499 cc (91.5 cu in) I3 turbo B38K15T0	231 PS (170 kW; 228 hp) at 5800 rpm	320 N⋅m (236 lb⋅ft) at 3700 rpm
2018–2020	hybrid synchronous motor	143 PS (105 kW; 141 hp) at 4800 rpm	250 N⋅m (184 lb⋅ft) at 0 rpm
2018–2020	Combined	374 PS (275 kW; 369 hp)	570 N⋅m (420 lb⋅ft) at 3700 rpm

=== Special edition ===
The special-edition BMW i8 Protonic Red Edition model was unveiled at the 2016 Geneva International Motor Show. The Protonic Red Edition was produced at BMW Plant Leipzig from July 2016. This special edition car sported a Protonic Red paint finish with accents in Frozen Grey metallic. The colour scheme was complemented by BMW W-spoke 470 light-alloy wheels painted in Orbit Grey metallic with hubs painted in Aluminium matte and mixed-size tires (front: 215/45 R20, rear: 245/40 R20). Inside, the car featured red double-stitching and applications in high-grade carbon fibre and ceramic trim.

=== Roadster ===
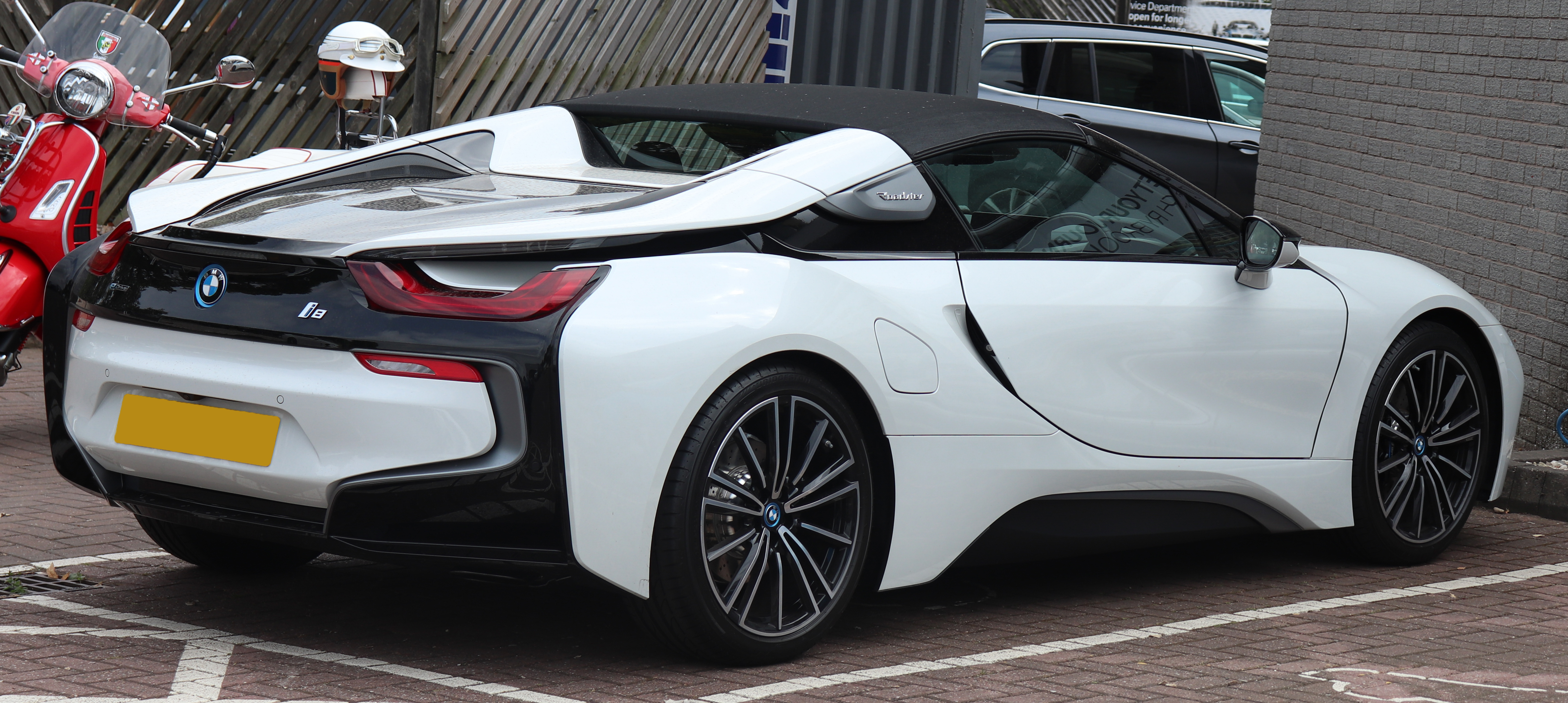
2018 BMW i8 Roadster

The BMW i8 Spyder concept was unveiled at the 2012 Beijing Auto Show. In October 2016, BMW announced that the roadster variant would be added to the BMW i line-up in 2018. The production version of the BMW i8 Roadster was premiered in late 2017, and delivery of the first 18 exclusive first edition units took place in May 2018.

The battery cell capacity of both models, coupé and roadster, was increased from 20 to 34 Ah and a gross energy content of 11.6 kWh. At the same time, optimized battery cell technology made it possible to increase the peak output of the electric motor by 9 kW/12 hp to 105 kW/143 hp. These improvements made it possible for the BMW i8 Coupé to accelerate from zero to 100 km/h (62 mph) in 4.4 seconds, while the BMW i8 Roadster took 4.6 seconds. Both models reached a top speed of 250 km/h (155 mph). The all-electric range rose to 55 km (34 mi) for the BMW i8 Coupé and to 53 km (33 mi) for the BMW i8 Roadster. The BMW i8 Roadster had only two seats, and the roof was an electric two-piece unit, which neatly folded into space where the rear seats would normally be.

== Sales and markets ==
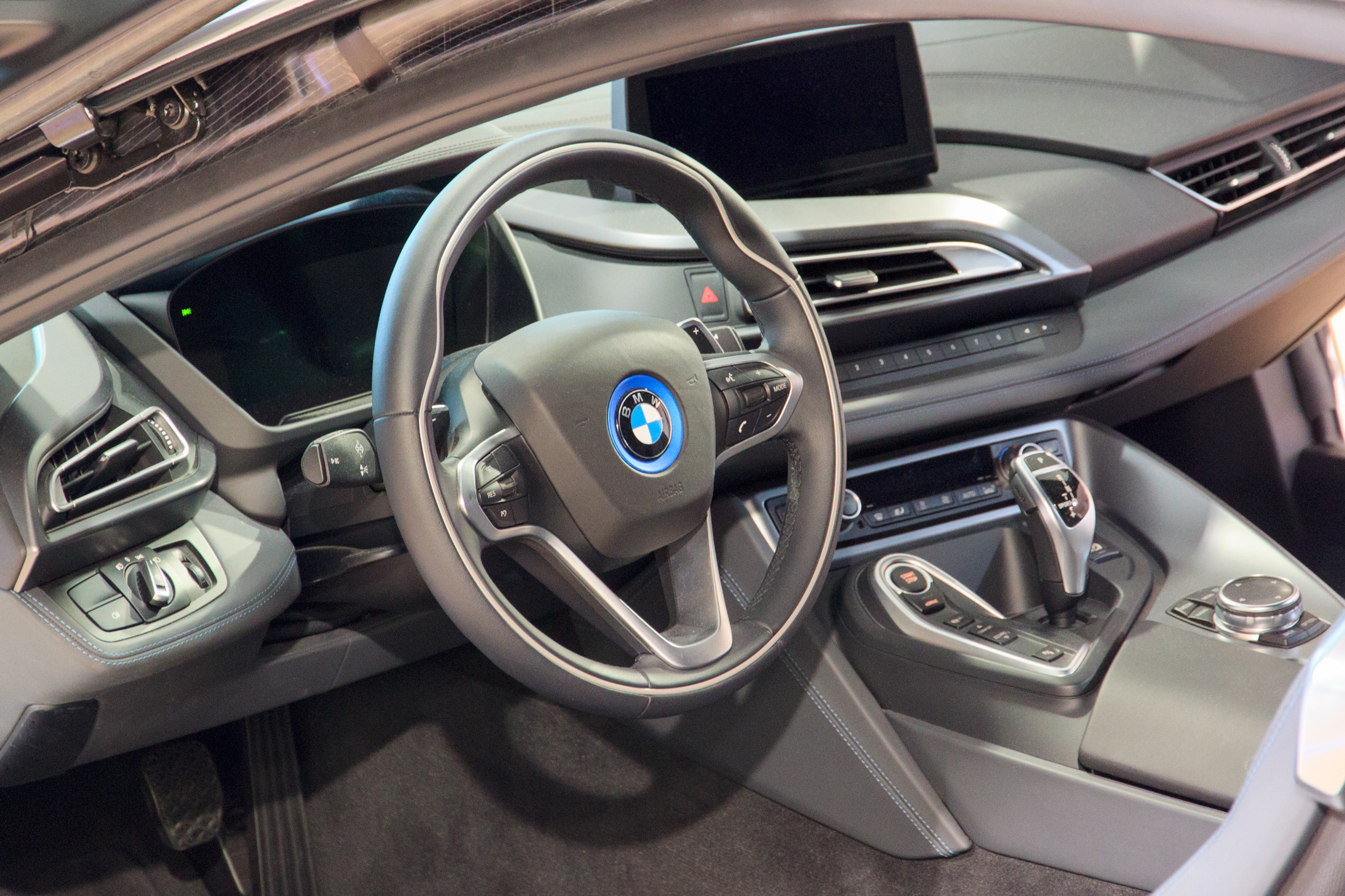
2014 BMW i8 interior

BMW originally planned to sell the i8 in about 50 countries, with the U.S. expected to be the largest sales market. In Europe, BMW expected the UK, Germany and France to be the top markets.

Global deliveries to retail customers totaled 1,741 units in 2014, and 5,456 in 2015, totaling cumulative sales of 7,197 units worldwide through December 2015. In 2015, global sales of the BMW i8 exceeded the combined figure of all other hybrid sports cars produced by other manufacturers. Global cumulative sales reached more than 10,000 BMW i8s by early November 2016, representing 10% of BMW's global electrified model sales. By March 2020, worldwide sales since inception totaled more than 20,000 units, making the i8 the world's top selling plug-in electric sports cars, and exceeding sales of all competitors in its segment combined.

Year	2014	2015	2014–2020 Total
Units sold	1,741	5,456	+20,000

=== Australia ===
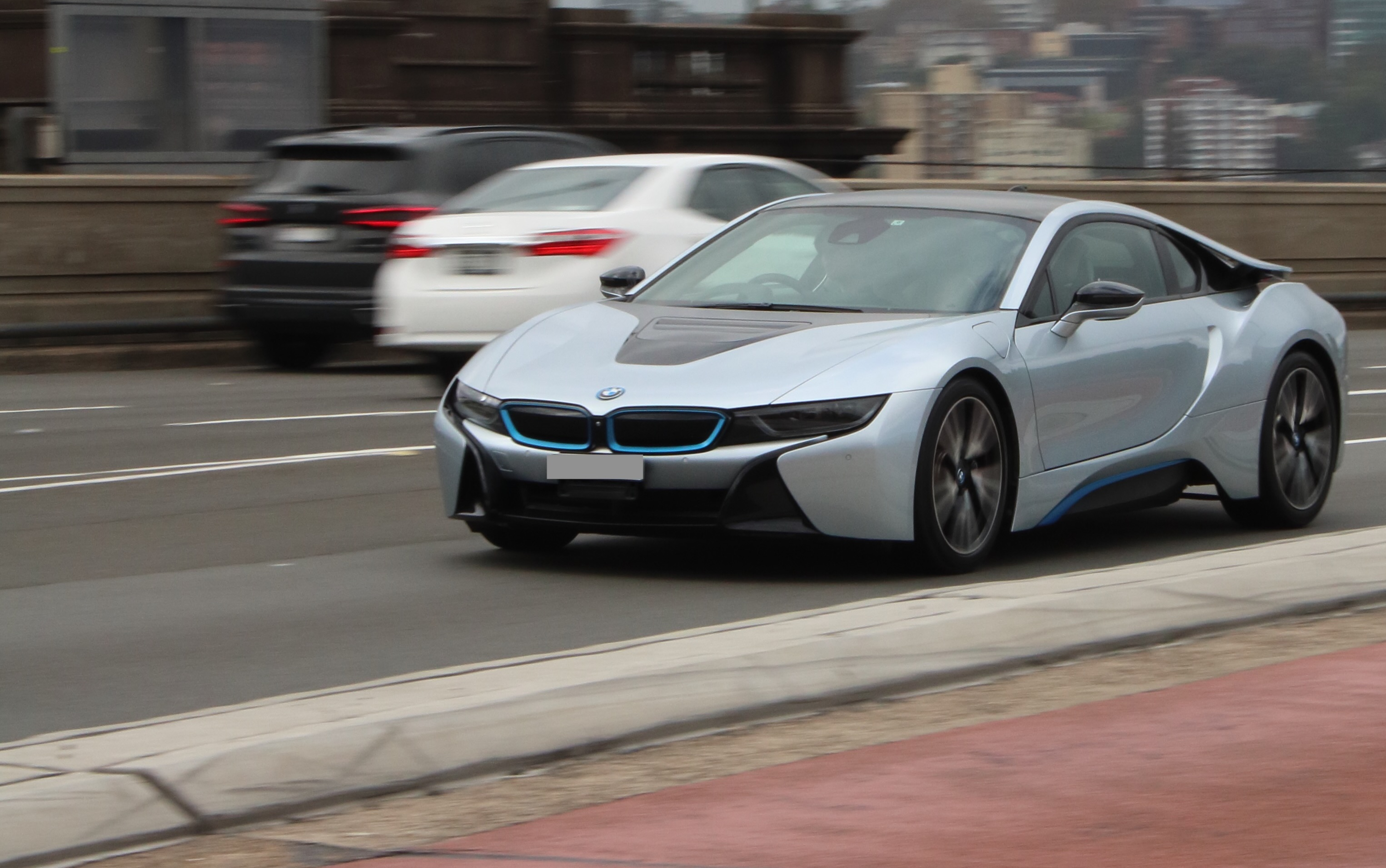
A BMW i8 on the Sydney Harbour Bridge

Deliveries in Australia for the i8 commenced in March 2015, priced at $299,000 AUD. 155 units of the i8 were sold in Australia by the end of its production. Unlike international sales process where the i3 and i8 were sold at dedicated BMW i Stores, Australia had six dedicated dealers across the country that were authorized to sell the i8: BMW Melbourne (South Melbourne, Victoria), BMW Sydney (Rushcutters Bay, New South Wales), Brisbane BMW (Fortitude Valley, Queensland), Perth Auto Classic (Burswood, Western Australia), Adelaide BMW (West Terrace, South Australia) and Rolfe Classic (Phillip, Australian Capital Territory).

Service and repair facilities for the BMW i8 were available at 11 authorized BMW dealers around Australia.

=== China ===
Pricing in China started at CN¥1.988 million (~US$323,000). Initially, sales of the BMW i brand vehicles were limited to seven dealerships in Beijing, Shanghai, Shenzhen and Shenyang. BMW expected combined sales of around 1,000 units for its i3 and i8 models through December 2014.

=== India ===
BMW introduced four variants of i8 in the Indian market in February 2015. This was the costliest offering from BMW in the country, at a price of INR 2.29 crore (ex-showroom). The car was sold through exclusive BMW i dealerships established in the cities of Chennai, Delhi, and Mumbai.

=== Japan ===
On 14 November 2013, BMW announced they were taking orders for the i8 in Japan. Pricing started at ¥19,170,000 (US$191,500) which included the 8% consumption tax.

=== Thailand ===
At the 2014 Bangkok International Motor Show, BMW announced that they were taking orders for the i8 in Thailand, priced at ฿11,839,000 THB and ฿12,389,000 THB, which included the 8% consumption tax. On 28 August 2018, BMW announced they were taking orders for the i8 Roadster, priced at ฿12,999,000 THB.

=== Indonesia ===
The i8 was launched at Gaikindo International Auto Show 2016 and went on sale in June 2017, followed by the roadster version two years later.

=== Europe ===
A total of 61 units were delivered in Europe in June 2014, its first month in the market.

Year	2013	2014	2015	2016	2017	2018	2019	2013–2019 Total
Units	41	1,133	2,056	1,517	988	1,506	1,077	8,318

European sales statistics are from the following countries: Austria, Belgium, Cyprus, Czech Republic, Denmark, Estonia, Finland, France, Germany, Great Britain, Greece, Hungary, Iceland, Ireland, Italy, Latvia, Lithuania, Luxembourg, Netherlands, Norway, Poland, Portugal, Romania, Slovakia, Slovenia, Spain, Sweden, Switzerland.

=== Spain ===
The i8 was available in Madrid starting in 2016.

=== Germany ===
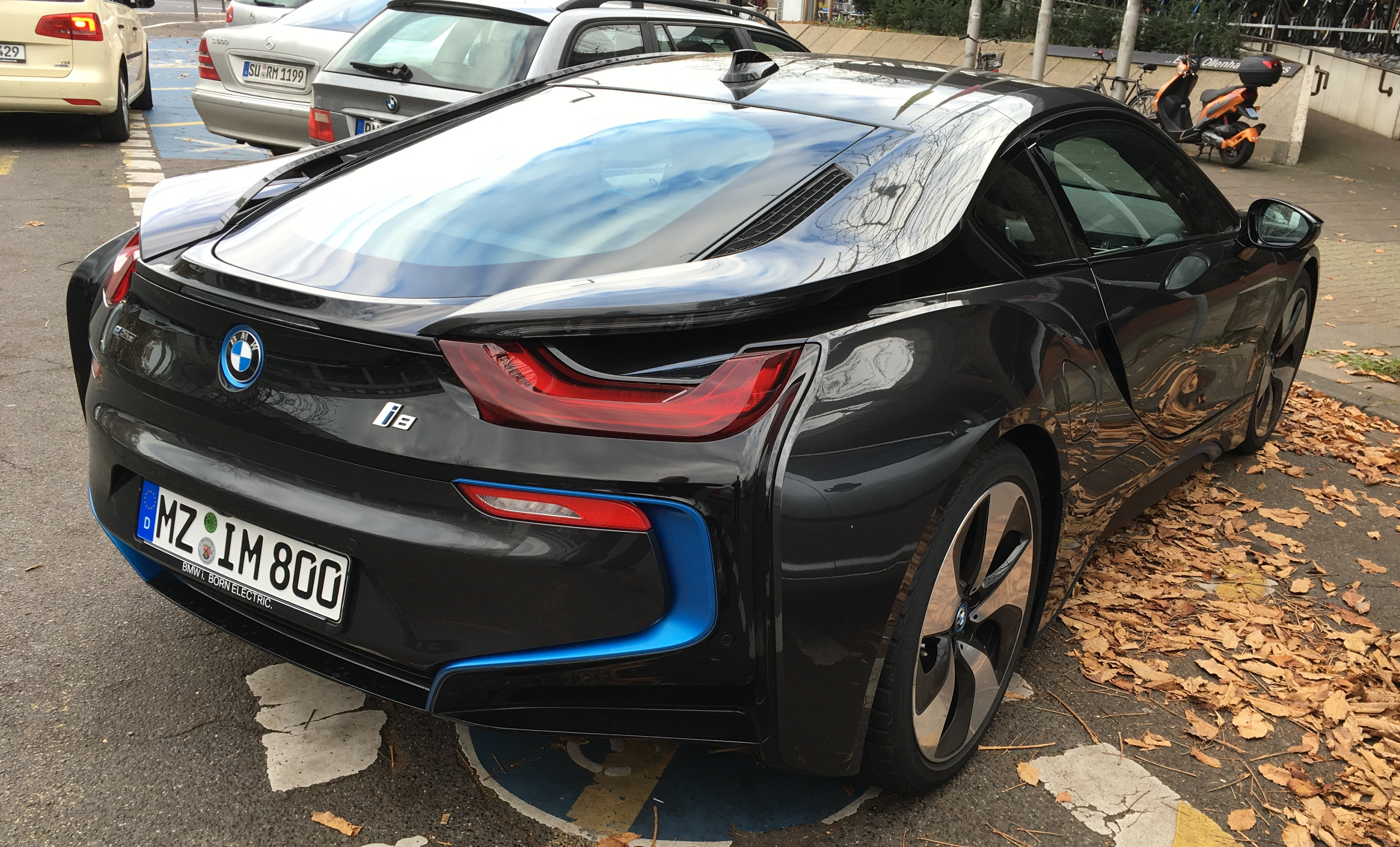
BMW i8 plug-in hybrid in Germany

The i8 was released in Germany in June 2014, with pricing starting at €126,000 (~US$169,000). As of September 2016, registrations totaled 986 units.

=== Switzerland ===
Deliveries began in June 2014, and a total of 64 units were registered in 2014. Cumulative sales reached 117 units through June 2015.

=== United Kingdom ===
Deliveries started in the UK in July 2014, with pricing starting at £99,845. The BMW i8 qualified for exemption from the London congestion charge, which was one of the factors driving its demand. The BMW i8 was eligible for the government's £5,000 Plug-in Car Grant until February 2016, when changes to the grant scheme eliminated eligibility for plug-in vehicles with a retail price over £60,000.

Two weeks after deliveries began, the i8 was sold out in the UK, and, by August 2014, there was a 10-month waiting list. By the end of February 2015, there was still a 9-month waiting list. A total of 1,307 units were registered by the end of June 2016. As of October 2016, about 1,700 i8s had been sold in the UK since mid-2014, making the British market the largest in Europe.

=== Mexico ===
The i8 was available in Mexico starting 2014 with a price tag of $2,299,900 MXN. On 30 August 2018, BMW announced they were taking orders for the i8 Roadster, priced at $3,199,900 MXN.

=== United States ===
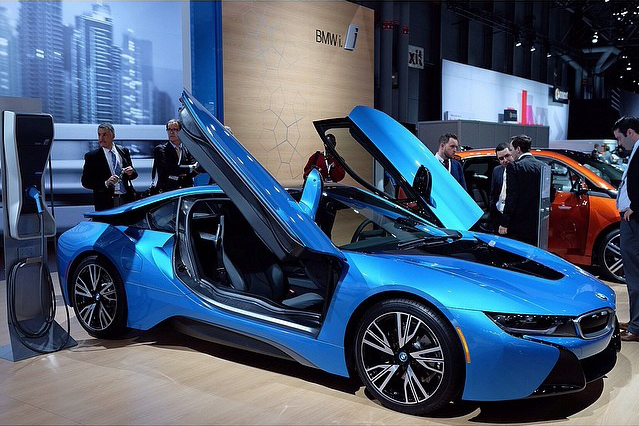
BMW i8 production version exhibited at the 2014 New York International Auto Show.

Pricing for the BMW i8 destined for the U.S. market started at US$135,925, including destination and handling fees and before any applicable government incentives. First deliveries to retail customers in the U.S. took place at the 2014 Pebble Beach Concours d'Elegance on 15 August. In order to commemorate the i8's American launch, a 2014 BMW i8 Concours d'Elegance Edition was auctioned during Gooding & Company's annual Pebble Beach Auctions. This special edition car featured BMW Individual Frozen Grey Metallic exterior paint, Dalbergia Brown leather upholstery, trim accents in BMW i Blue, and other unique features. The car was sold for US$825,000 (€616,000 or £495,000) on 16 August 2014, six times the retail price of the i8. The proceedings went to the Pebble Beach Company Foundation.

Sales in 2015 reached 2,265 units, up 308% from 2014. A total of 6,776 units were sold through December 2019.

==== Sales figures ====
Year	2014	2015	2016	2017	2018	2019	2014–2019 Total
Units	555	2,265	1,594	488	772	1,102	6,776

== Awards and Recognition ==
In July 2012, the BMW i8 won the 2012 North American Concept Vehicle of the Year. The BMW i8 Spyder won the 2013 Best Production Preview Vehicle award. The i8 won AutoGuide's 2015 Reader's Choice Green Car of the Year. BMW's i8 was the winner of the title 'World Green car of the Year' at Fame India Eco Drive 2015. It also was selected as Autoblog's 2014 Technology of the Year. Top Gear Magazine awarded the i8 with their Car of the Year award for 2014. Green Car Journal awarded the BMW i8 with its 2015 Luxury Green Car of the Year. The i8 won the UK Car of the Year 2015 and also UK Performance Car of the Year 2015. The World Car of the Year organization declared the i8 as the winner of the 2015 World Green Car Award. In 2023, Top Gear named the i8 the best car of the last 30 years.

== Reception ==
The BMW i8 received mixed reviews from the public, with discussions typically focusing on the contrast between the vehicle's exotic styling and its hybrid powertrain. Upon release, critics praised the i8's futuristic design and butterfly doors, while automotive journalists noted that while the carbon fibre chassis allowed for sharp handling, the three-cylinder engine and electric motors fell short of the straight-line performance expected at its premium price point.

== Marketing ==
Louis Vuitton produced a series of carbon-black luggage for BMW i8, which included the Weekender GM i8, Garment Bag i8, Business Case i8, and Weekender PM i8. The luggage series went on sale in a selection of Louis Vuitton stores worldwide (Munich, Milan, London, Paris, Moscow, Dubai, New York, and Los Angeles) starting on 1 April 2014.

== See also ==
- BMW ActiveE
- Government incentives for plug-in electric vehicles
- Mini E
- List of battery electric vehicles
