= Richard C. Kim =

United States Army brigadier general

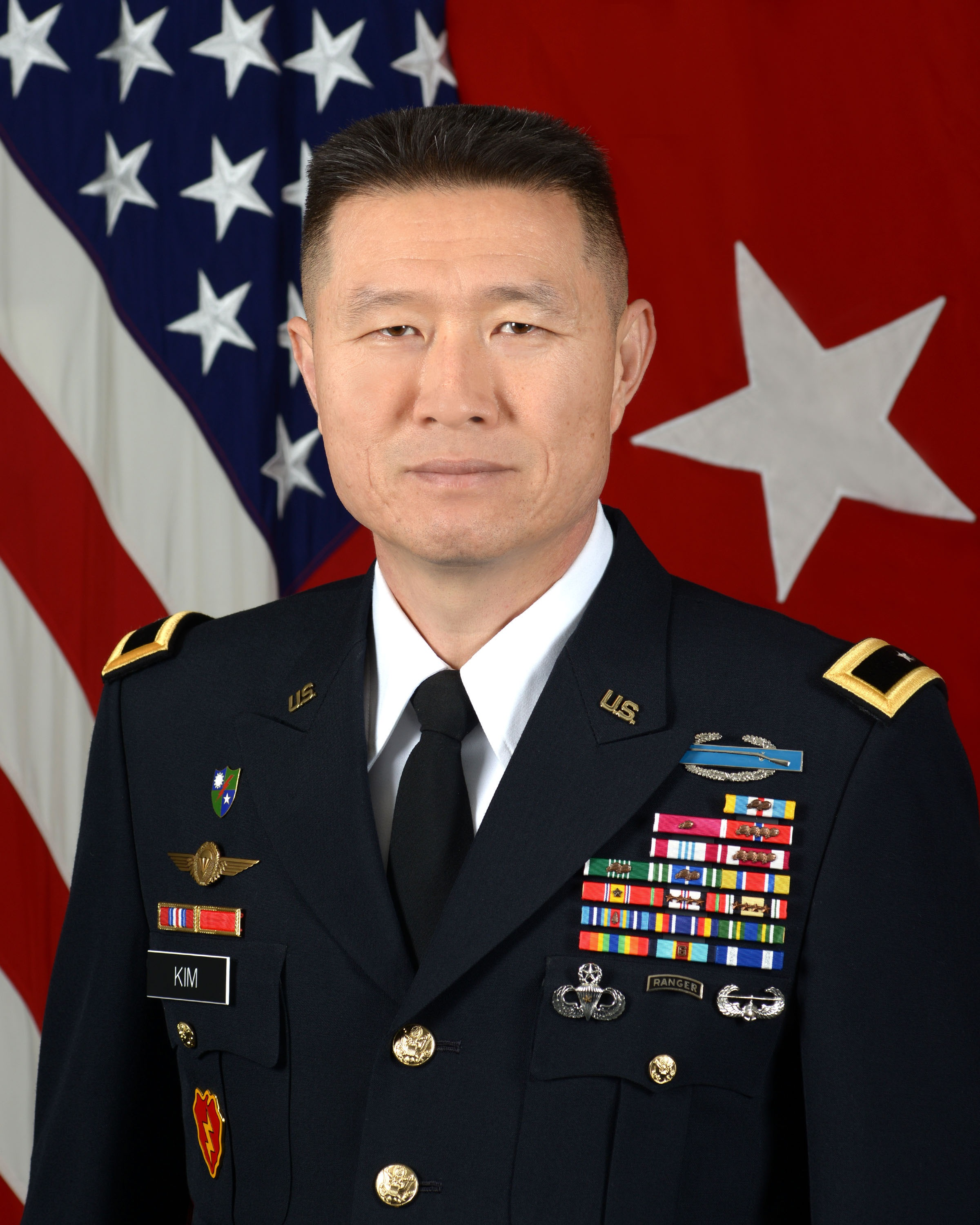
- Alma mater: University of Hawaii at Manoa
- Military career
- Allegiance: United States
- Branch: United States Army
- Service years: 1988–2018
- Rank: Brigadier General
- Commands: United States Army North (Fifth Army)
- Conflicts: Iraq War; Afghanistan War
- Awards: Defense Superior Service Medal, Legion of Merit, Bronze Star Medal, Defense Meritorious Service Medal, Meritorious Service Medal, Army Commendation Medal, Army Achievement Medal, Combat Infantryman Badge, Expert Infantryman Badge, Master Parachutist Badge w/ bronze star device, Air Assault Badge, Ranger Tab

Richard C. Kim is a retired United States Army brigadier general.

== Biography ==
Kim graduated from the University of Hawaii at Manoa. In May 1988, after his graduation he was commissioned as a lieutenant in the infantry.

Kim has served on staff at multiple levels of command, including Battalion, Regiment, Sub-unified Combatant Commands, Multinational NATO Operational command, and the Army Staff. In 2001, he was appointed as 3rd Ranger Battalion Liaison Officer and Operations Officer, and later as the Assistant Operations Officer and Regimental Executive Officer for the 75th Ranger Regiment. After which, he commanded the 2nd Battalion, 325th Infantry Regiment 82nd Airborne Division (from 2005 to 2006); the 3rd Brigade, 25th Infantry Division which deployed to Afghanistan from 2011 to 2012, and Deputy Commanding General (Maneuver) for 2nd Infantry Division (Combined), Eighth Army, in South Korea from 2014 to 2015.

In July 2015, he deployed to Kabul, Afghanistan to serve as Director, Resolute Support Mission, NATO after which he returned to Washington D.C. to serve as deputy director, Program Analysis and Evaluation Office of the Deputy Chief of Staff. On June 26, 2017, he was appointed Deputy Commanding General - Operations of United States Army North (Fifth Army). On September 27, 2017, Kim was deployed from HQ, U.S. Army North in support of recovery operations in Puerto Rico after the devastation of Hurricane Maria as Deputy Commander Operations, responsible for coordinating operations between the military, FEMA and other government agencies, and the private sector.

He also holds a master's degree in National Security Strategy from National Defense University.

Kim's awards and decorations include the Defense Superior Service Medal, Legion of Merit, Bronze Star Medal, Defense Meritorious Service Medal, Meritorious Service Medal, Army Commendation Medal, Army Achievement Medal, Combat Infantryman Badge, Expert Infantryman Badge, Master Parachutist Badge w/ bronze star device, Air Assault Badge, and the Ranger Tab.
