= En-V =

EN-V can refer to:

- The LG enV (VX9900) cell phone
- The General Motors EN-V autonomous electronic car prototype.
