= Personal Urban Mobility and Accessibility =

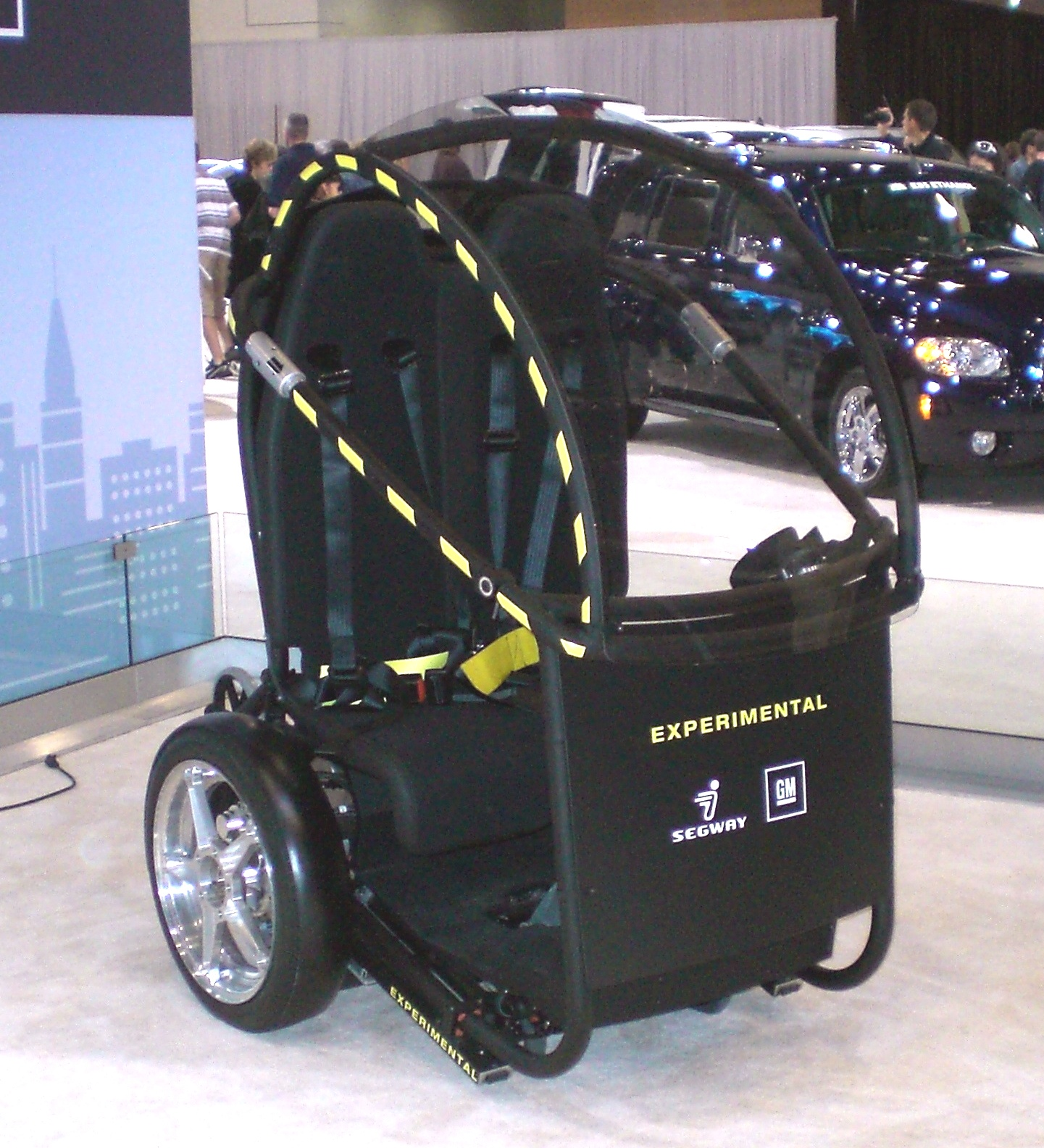
PUMA prototype

The Personal Urban Mobility and Accessibility (PUMA) was an experimental electrically powered road vehicle created by Segway and adopted by General Motors as a concept vehicle representing the future of urban transportation. It operates on two wheels placed side by side, a layout that differs in placement from motorcycles which instead have their two wheels placed at the front and rear.

The PUMA design transfers the two-wheeled self-balancing characteristics of a Segway PT into a vehicle that can carry two passengers side by side at up to 35 miles per hour (56 km/h) for a distance of up to 35 miles (56 km).

Segway's CEO and President, James D. Norrod claimed that the use of General Motors' sales network worldwide could allow for PUMA sales to exceed the number of Segway PT models sold to date.

By 2016, Segway no longer shared information about the PUMA project at Segway.com. However, it featured the PUMA at its new Chinese flagship store, which opened in Beijing in August 2016.

== Prototype ==
The first public prototype was demonstrated in April 2009, being formally announced by Segway and General Motors in advance of its display at the New York International Auto Show. Norrod stated that using a "Neighborhood Electric Vehicle" size of lithium-ion battery would give the PUMA a range of 35 miles (56 km), and could be recharged in about three hours at a cost of $0.35 US dollars. The prototype weighs approximately 300 pounds (140 kg).

=== Safety ===
One idea proposed is that the vehicle would make use of its Global Positioning System (GPS) determined position to avoid crashes with other vehicles; the position would be transmitted to other vehicles using a communications technology. With all of the vehicles knowing their whereabouts, it would allow each car to drive itself to avoid obstacles including other vehicles and pedestrians. The developers claim that crash-avoidance systems would eliminate the need for airbags and would include seat belts exclusively for "comfort purposes".

The limited top speed would prevent the use of the vehicle on highways and other roadways with a speed limit in excess of 35 miles per hour (56 km/h). Initial uses might include college campuses and other locations where traditional passenger cars and trucks are limited.

=== Technology ===
The vehicle uses Segway's dynamic stabilization technology to maintain balance across two parallel wheels while driving. In addition to the main driving wheels at each side of the vehicle, there are small stabilizing wheels at both front and rear to support the vehicle whilst parked and to limit the maximum leaning angle.

== See also ==
- General Motors EN-V
- BMW Mega City Vehicle
- VisLab, and their VIAC intercontinental challenge (driving from Italy to China with autonomous vehicles)
- Google driverless car
- MIT Media Lab CityCar
