= General Motors EN-V =

Electric autonomous vehicle with cabin on two wheels

GM EN-V
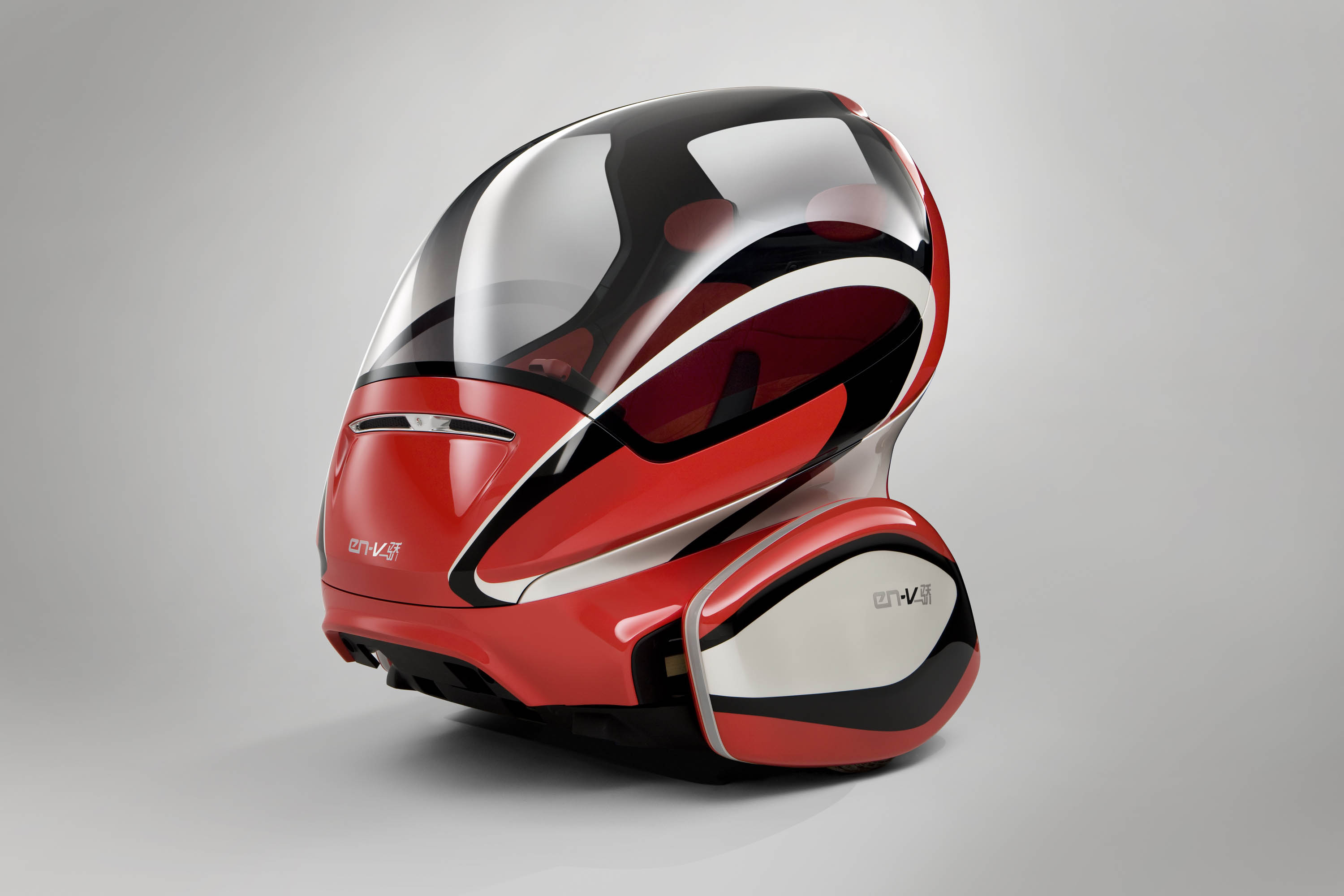
- 2012 GM EN-V

Overview
- Manufacturer: GM
- Production: 2011-2014

Body and chassis
- Body style: hatchback

General Motors EN-V (Electric Networked-Vehicle) is a 2-seat urban electric concept car jointly developed by Segway Inc. and General Motors that can be driven normally or operated autonomously.

Designed for urban environments and around an extrapolation of the P.U.M.A. prototype announced by GM and Segway in 2009, the EN-V was unveiled at the joint GM & SAIC pavilion at the Expo 2010 in Shanghai from 1 May through 31 October 2010. Three different vehicles are showcased, 笑 Xiao (Laugh), 骄 Jiao (Pride) and 妙 Miao (Magic).

In October 2011 General Motors announced its decision to develop a second concept EN-V under the Chevrolet badge for use in field testing and demonstration programs, beginning in Tianjin, China. In June 2014 General Motors announced it would commence testing of the four wheel EN-V 2.0 at the Tianjin Eco-city

== Driverless vehicle ==
The most significant feature of the vehicles is autonomous operation. The EN-V can detect and avoid obstacles – including other vehicles – park themselves and come to you when called by phone.

Accomplished through a combination of GPS, vehicle-based sensors, and vehicle-to-vehicle communication, this autonomous technology is an extrapolation of that found in GM's 2007 autonomous "The Boss" Chevrolet Tahoe created for the DARPA Grand Challenge (2007).

The EN-Vs can communicate with each other allowing platooning, with one or more EN-Vs tagging along automatically behind a leader. Also, if an EN-V detects another in close proximity, it can check what that other is intending to do and agree on how to pass it safely.

== Shanghai concept ==
=== Specifications ===
Powered by two electric motors, one on each wheel, and a lithium-ion phosphate battery, the EN-V has a top speed of 40 kilometres per hour (25 mph) and a maximum all-electric range of 40 kilometres (25 mi). The sensors and communications equipment which allow it to drive itself include short-range radio and GPS, as well as optical sensors, ultrasonic sensors and doppler radars. The two-wheeled balancing system the EN-V uses was developed by Segway, and it may be an extrapolation of that found in the P.U.M.A. prototype announced by GM and Segway in 2009.

=== The themes ===
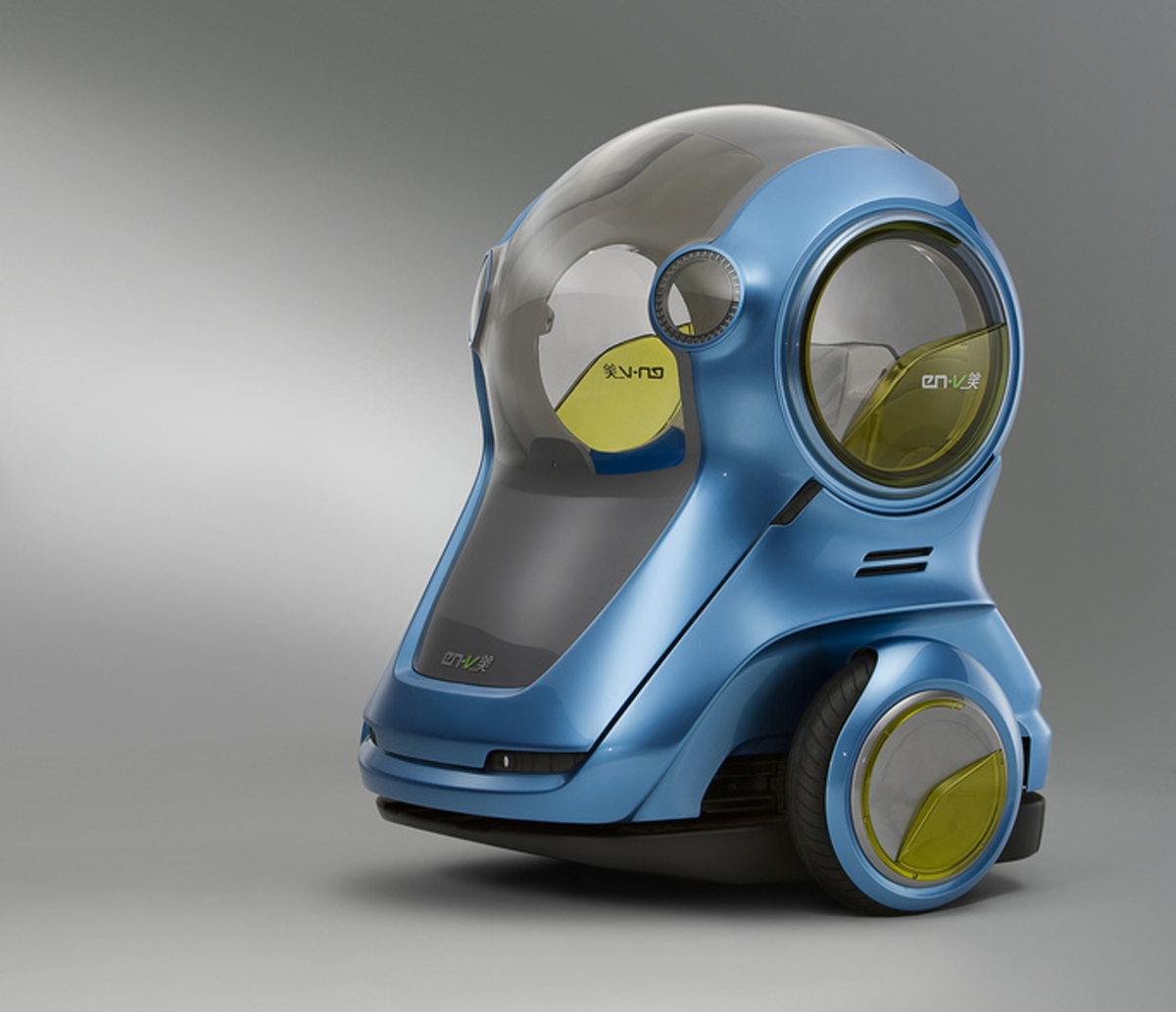
EN-V Laugh (Xiao, 笑)

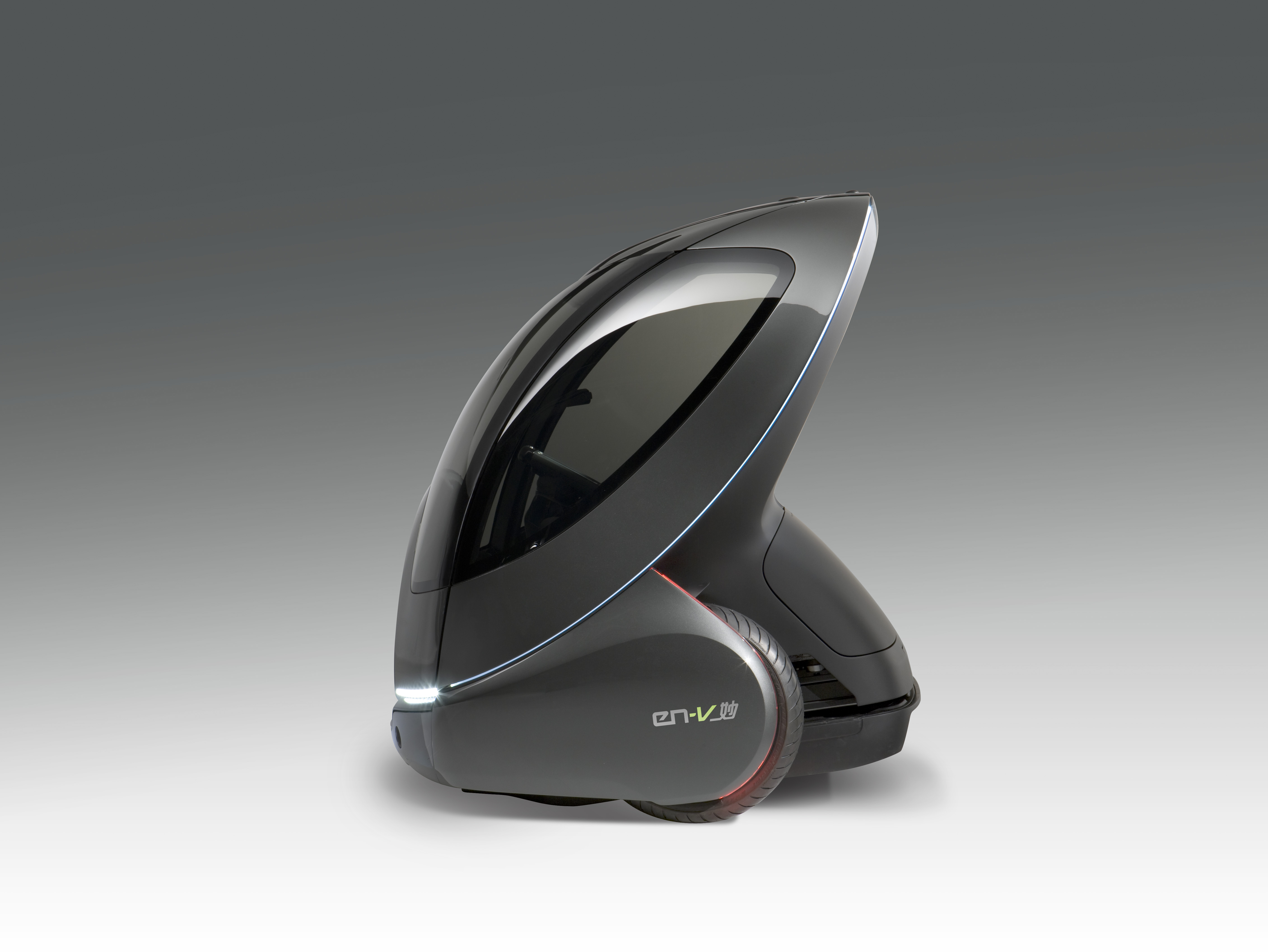
EN-V Magic (Miao, 妙)

The three vehicles shown use the same automobile platform but have unique exterior and interior designs.

==== Xiao (笑) ====
Xiao, or laugh, was designed in Australia by the GM Holden Design Studio. Its design is intended to appear friendly.

Xiao Dimensions: 1,540 mm (L) × 1,420 mm (W) × 1,770 mm (H) (60.5 in × 56 in × 69.5 in)

==== Miao (妙) ====
Miao, or magic, was designed at the General Motors Advanced Design Studio in California. Miao's design is mysterious and high-tech. It was also exhibited at the Walt Disney World ride Test Track as a Chevrolet

Miao Dimensions: 1,520 mm (L) × 1,405 mm (W) × 1,635 mm (H) (60 in × 55 in × 64.5 in)

==== Jiao (骄) ====
Jiao, or pride, was designed in Europe by Opel and takes design cues from bullet trains and Chinese opera masks. Its design is supposed to be chic and stylish.

Jiao Dimensions: 1,500 mm (L) × 1,425 mm (W) × 1,640 mm (H) (59 in × 56 in × 64.5 in)

== Chevrolet EN-V 2.0 ==
In October 2011 General Motors announced its decision to develop a second concept EN-V under the Chevrolet badge for use in field testing and demonstration programs in several cities around the world, beginning in Tianjin, China. The Chevrolet EN-V 2.0, as the vehicle is now called, will add new features such as climate control, personal storage space and all-weather and road condition operation while several key elements of the original EN-V will be preserved, such as the small footprint, maneuverability, its battery electric propulsion, connectivity, and autonomous driving capabilities. The new vehicle design as revealed in 2014 has four wheels and has two doors (one of each side). Testing at the Tianjin Eco-city was due to commence in July 2014.

== In popular culture ==
- The Chevy EN-V is featured in the Walt Disney Pictures film Tomorrowland.
- The EN-V is featured as part of the queue for the Epcot pavilion Test Track at Walt Disney World, which is sponsored by Chevrolet.

== See also ==
- City Car (Concept)
- Driverless car
- Google driverless car
- MIT Car
- Nissan Pivo
- Personal Urban Mobility and Accessibility
- Renault Twizy Z.E.
- VisLab, and their VIAC intercontinental challenge (driving from Italy to China with autonomous vehicles)
