= Foria =

Foria may refer to:

- Foria, Centola, Campania, Italy, a village
- Nissan Foria, a 2004 Japanese compact coupe concept
