= Nissan Jikoo =

Overview
- Type: Concept car
- Manufacturer: Nissan
- Production: 2003

Body and chassis
- Body style: 2-door roadster

The Nissan Jikoo is an open top, two seater concept car shown by Japanese automobile manufacturer Nissan at the 2003 Tokyo Motor Show.

== Overview ==
Inspired by the 1935 Datsun Type 14 Roadster, the Jikoo was created by Nissan during the Tokyo Government's project to celebrate the 400th anniversary of the Edo Shogunate. Many features of the car represented various industrial trades prominent during the Edo period, such as a tortoise shell style steering wheel (actually made from water buffalo horn) and headlamps mimicking Japanese art glass and paper lanterns of the period. Also included was an in car automated tour guide providing information about the city of Tokyo, and showing maps dating from the Edo period to the present day. The car was based on Nissan's Hypermini electric platform.
