= Tokyo Motor Show =

Biennial auto show in Tokyo, Japan

Japan Mobility Show ジャパンモビリティショー
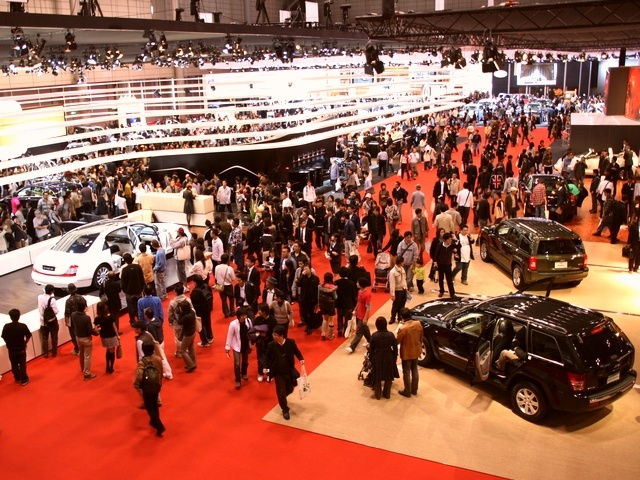
- Tokyo Motor Show in 2007
- Status: Active
- Genre: Auto show
- Frequency: Annual (1954–73; 2000–05); Biennially (1975–99; 2007–present)
- Venue: Hibiya Park (1954–57); Korakuen Velodrome (1958); Harumi Showplace (1959–88); Makuhari Messe (1989–2009); Tokyo Big Sight (2011–present)
- Location: Tokyo
- Coordinates: 35°38′54″N 140°2′5″E
- Country: Japan
- Years active: 72
- Inaugurated: April 20, 1954
- Most recent: 30 October 2025 – 9 November 2025
- Next event: October 2027 – November 2027
- Patron: JAMA
- Website: www.japan-mobility-show.com

The Japan Mobility Show (ジャパンモビリティショー), called Tokyo Motor Show (東京モーターショー) (TMS) until 2023, is a biennial auto show held in October–November at the Tokyo Big Sight, Tokyo, Japan for cars, motorcycles and commercial vehicles. Hosted by the Japan Automobile Manufacturers Association (JAMA), it is a recognized international show by the Organisation Internationale des Constructeurs d'Automobiles, and normally sees more concept cars than actual production car introductions, which is the reason why the automotive press sees the show as one of the motorshow's big five (along with Detroit, Geneva, Frankfurt and Paris).

For the first time in its 67-year history, the show was cancelled for 2021 due to rising cases of COVID-19.

== History ==
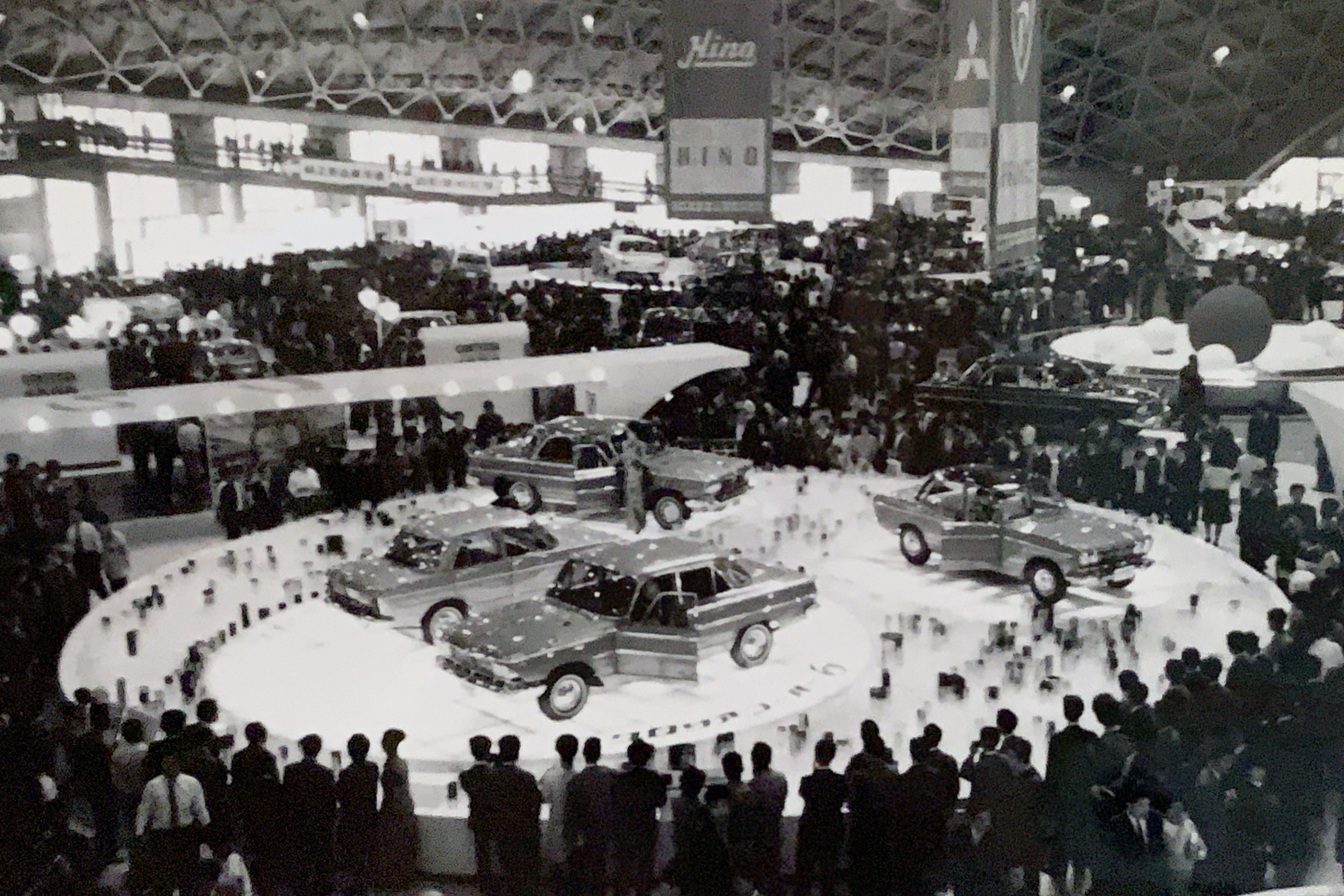
Tokyo Motor Show 1960s

The show, originally called All Japan Motor Show was first held in an outdoor venue called Hibiya Park, the show was considered a success with 547,000 visitors over ten days and 254 exhibitors displaying 267 vehicles, but of the 267, only 17 of them were passenger cars as the show was dominated by commercial vehicles. In 1958, due to construction of a subway and underground parking lot near Hibiya Park, the show was shifted to the Korakuen Bicycle Racing Track. The show changed venues again in 1959 as the previous year was marred by heavy rain. It moved to an indoor facility, the newly opened Harumi Showplace which was three times the size of its previous venue. The 1962 show attracted more than 1 million visitors to view 410 vehicles from 284 exhibitors.

Starting in 1973, the organisers decided to suspend the 1974 show due to the international energy crisis and the show became a biennial event. The show relocated to the convention and exhibition center Makuhari Messe in 1989, then its current venue Tokyo Big Sight in 2011. Due to high public demand for vehicles in everyday use and the fact that concept cars dominate the show, the show returned to being an annual event from 2001 to 2005 with a show for passenger cars and motorcycle in odd-numbered years and smaller shows for commercial vehicles in 2002 and 2004. However, from 2007 onwards the event has once again returned to a biennial schedule which combines both passenger and commercial vehicles, including motorcycles and auto parts.

After several consecutive events with declining attendance, the 2019 Tokyo Motor Show recorded almost double the attendance of the 2017 event, which was attributed to expanding the scope beyond automobiles. The 2021 event was cancelled due to the ongoing COVID-19 pandemic, The planned 2023 event will include other automobile-related industries and has been rebranded to the Japan Mobility Show.

== By year ==
=== 1950s ===
Tokyo Motor Show, 1954–59
No.	Year	Dates			Venue	Admission fees (incl. tax)	Area		Number of			Ref.
No.	Year	Start	End	Days	Venue	Admission fees (incl. tax)	Site	Exhibits	Exhibitors	Vehicles	Visitors	Ref.
1	§ 1954	Apr 20, 1954	Apr 29, 1954	10	Hibiya	¥0 (free)	14,999 m^{2} 161,450 sq ft	4,389 m^{2} 47,240 sq ft	254	267	547,000	
2	§ 1955	May 7, 1955	May 18, 1955	12	Hibiya	¥0 (free)	14,999 m^{2} 161,450 sq ft	4,689 m^{2} 50,470 sq ft	232	191	784,800	
3	§ 1956	Apr 20, 1956	Apr 29, 1956	10	Hibiya	¥0 (free after Apr 22)	14,999 m^{2} 161,450 sq ft	5,405 m^{2} 58,180 sq ft	267	247	598,300	
4	§ 1957	May 9, 1957	May 19, 1957	11	Hibiya	¥20	14,999 m^{2} 161,450 sq ft	6,049 m^{2} 65,110 sq ft	278	268	527,200	
5	§ 1958	Oct 10, 1958	Oct 20, 1958	11	Korakuen	¥30	28,050 m^{2} 301,900 sq ft	6,094 m^{2} 65,600 sq ft	302	256	519,400	
6	§ 1959	Oct 24, 1959	Nov 4, 1959	12	Harumi	¥50	44,653 m^{2} 480,640 sq ft	8,996 m^{2} 96,830 sq ft	303	317	653,000	

==== 1954 ====
The first Tokyo Motor Show was held in Hibiya Park from April 20 to April 29, 1954. Of the 267 vehicles on display, only seventeen were passenger cars, which reflected the paucity of personal family transport in Japan at the time. Trucks, buses, and motorcycles made up most of the exhibits. Approximately 547,000 visitors attended the show over the ten days, where the most prominent cars were the Austin A40, Hillman Minx and the newly introduced Renault 4CV, as well as domestic vehicles such as the Prince Sedan AISH, Toyota Toyopet Super RH; Datsun Passenger Delux (Model DB-5), Ohta Sedan and Van, and three-wheeled vehicles from Daihatsu.

==== 1955 ====
The second Tokyo Motor Show was held over twelve days, from May 7 to May 18, 1955. Almost 785,000 visitors attended, among them HIH Prince Akihito. The highlights of the passenger cars on display were the new Datsun 110, Toyopet Crown RS and Toyopet Master RR.

The Second All-Japan Motor Show was held in 1955 at Hibiya Park, the same venue as the previous year. The show was extended to 12 days. Exhibitors still focused on commercial vehicles, such as trucks, that year. Notably, in the light-duty truck category, advanced models were displayed, including Toyota's 4-wheel light truck SKB (1,000cc engine) which will be renamed as Toyoace in 1956, Nissan's Datsun 120 Truck and Fuji Seimitsu's 1.5-ton class 4-wheel truck. These models featured both excellent driving performance and handling stability that well outperform conventional 3-wheel light trucks.

New passenger cars also were presented on the motor show's stages. Toyota unveiled its 1.5-liter engine class small cars such as Toyopet Crown and Toyopet Master, while Nissan's Datsun 110 (860cc engine) also made its debut. These cars were signs of the start of the motorization of Japanese society with made-in-Japan brands. Meanwhile, the Imperial Prince visited the motor show for the first time.

==== 1956 ====
Passenger cars began to assume the greatest prominence at the third Tokyo Motor Show which opened on April 20, 1956, over a 10-day period at Hibiya Park. This was primarily due to an initiative spearheaded by the Ministry of International Trade and Industry called the "people's car plan" or the "National Car Project", announced in May 1955. Although its stated target of a four-seat car capable of 100 km/h (62 mph) and available for ¥150,000 was unrealistic — despite being twice the national average income at the time, it was still only one fifth of what a typical vehicle cost — it was given credit as the spur for domestic automakers to strive to lower their prices.

From this year, exhibited products have been grouped by vehicle type - truck, pickup truck, passenger car, 2-wheeler, and motorcycle. This measure was taken to provide more merits for visitors because the majority of them were particularly interested in passenger cars. A poster of the motor show carried the slogan "Japanese Automobiles at a Glance!"

The Japanese government also had planned to release the national car at an affordable price range of around 250,000 yen. At that time, passenger cars were still very expensive for the general public in reality. At the same time, they had a premonition that the "passenger cars" they dreamt of would gradually be getting closer to their lives. Passenger cars became the boom of the motor show, accordingly.

==== 1957 ====
Although only 527,000 people visited the fourth show between May 9 and May 19, 1957, significant vehicles made their debut; the first of the long running Toyota Corona and Prince Skyline were introduced, as well as a prototype of the Datsun Sports.

The Fourth All-Japan Motor Show was held at Hibiya Park during an 11-day period from May 9. In the passenger car category, a significant improvement was found in the quality of exhibited vehicles, including the first-generation Toyopet Corona small car, Fuji Seimitsu's Prince Skyline, and the Nissan Datsun Sport prototype. In the truck category, Toyota displayed its first diesel truck (DA60), while Nissan unveiled its Nissan Junior and Nissan 581 models. Ohta also exhibited its 1.5-ton class light truck model. Meanwhile, an automobile information bureau was newly set up in the PR Center to provide extended knowledge on road traffic and vehicle design, etc. In this show, the organizer successfully provided visitors and exhibitors with an opportunity for business talks in addition to the general promotion of automobiles.

==== 1958 ====
It was held from October 10 to October 20, 1958.

For the Fifth Motor Show, the venue was changed to the infield space of Korakuen Bicycle Race Stadium due to construction at Hibiya Park. The time period of the show was also shifted to commence from October 10. The motor show hereafter opens as an autumn event organized by the Japan Motor Industrial Federation, Inc. In the fifth show, a Technical Center (sponsored by the Society of Automotive Engineering) was created to promote technical developments of made-in-Japan automobiles, as well as a new Meeting Place for business talks. An automobile information room was also provided near the main entrance of the venue. More than 300 people visited the center per day.

Although some newspapers were critical, saying that a Japanese car for the common people had not yet been produced this year either, a newly released Subaru 360 was very popular at the national event. Other vehicles which aroused interest included the Mikasa Touring 600cc engine car equipped with a torque converter, and the Crown 1,500cc diesel engine model.

==== 1959 ====
The 1959 show opened on October 24 and ran until November 4, 1959. Notable premieres included Mitsubishi's first own passenger car, the Mitsubishi 500.

The Japan Trade Center (indoor exhibition hall), located in Harumi, was newly chosen as the venue for the Sixth Motor Show. The total area of the site was nearly three times that of Hibiya, while the exhibiting space was double that of Hibiya site. The admission fee, which comes with the lottery tickets, also was raised to 50 yen per person.

The number of exhibited vehicles expanded to 317 units in this year's show. In the passenger car category, Japanese automakers displayed attractive models, including the Subaru 360, Mitsubishi 500, Datsun Sports 211, and the all-new Bluebird. Toyota also presented its Mater Line equipped with Japan's first automatic transmission. The Prince Skyline featured a 1,500cc engine with a maximum output of 70 horse-power. In the truck category, The Nissan Datsun Truck G220 and many 3-wheeler models were highlighted.

=== 1960s ===
Tokyo Motor Show, 1960–69
No.	Year	Dates			Venue	Admission fees (incl. tax)	Area		Number of			Ref.
No.	Year	Start	End	Days	Venue	Admission fees (incl. tax)	Site	Exhibits	Exhibitors	Vehicles	Visitors	Ref.
7	§ 1960	Oct 25, 1960	Nov 7, 1960	14	Harumi	¥50	44,653 m^{2} 480,640 sq ft	11,025 m^{2} 118,670 sq ft	294	358	812,400	
8	§ 1961	Oct 25, 1961	Nov 7, 1961	14	Harumi	¥100	79,236 m^{2} 852,890 sq ft	13,470 m^{2} 145,000 sq ft	303	375	952,100	
9	§ 1962	Oct 25, 1962	Nov 7, 1962	14	Harumi	¥100	107,710 m^{2} 1,159,400 sq ft	21,209 m^{2} 228,290 sq ft	284	410	1,049,100	
10	§ 1963	Oct 26, 1963	Nov 10, 1963	16	Harumi	¥100 (premium ¥500)	141,756 m^{2} 1,525,850 sq ft	28,921 m^{2} 311,300 sq ft	287	441	1,216,900	
11	§ 1964	Sep 26, 1964	Oct 9, 1964	14	Harumi	¥100 (premium ¥500)	137,002 m^{2} 1,474,680 sq ft	34,889 m^{2} 375,540 sq ft	274	598	1,161,000	
12	§ 1965	Oct 29, 1965	Nov 11, 1965	14	Harumi	¥100 (premium ¥500)	136,002 m^{2} 1,463,910 sq ft	36,800 m^{2} 396,000 sq ft	243	642	1,465,800	
13	§ 1966	Oct 26, 1966	Nov 8, 1966	14	Harumi	¥120 (charity ¥500)	148,433 m^{2} 1,597,720 sq ft	39,089 m^{2} 420,750 sq ft	245	732	1,502,300	
14	§ 1967	Oct 26, 1967	Nov 8, 1967	14	Harumi	¥200 (charity ¥500)	125,086 m^{2} 1,346,410 sq ft	35,732 m^{2} 384,620 sq ft	235	655	1,402,500	
15	§ 1968	Oct 26, 1968	Nov 11, 1968	17	Harumi	¥200 (charity ¥500)	139,356 m^{2} 1,500,020 sq ft	39,819 m^{2} 428,610 sq ft	246	723	1,511,600	
16	§ 1969	Oct 24, 1969	Nov 6, 1969	14	Harumi	¥200 (charity ¥500)	128,693 m^{2} 1,385,240 sq ft	38,552 m^{2} 414,970 sq ft	256	722	1,523,500	

==== 1960 ====
It was held from October 25 to November 7, 1960.

==== 1961 ====
It was held from October 25 to November 7, 1961.

The "brilliant" Eighth Motor Show featured various sports cars and prototypes. The exhibiting area was double the space of the previous show and a South Gate was newly added. An extended exhibition time (through 8 p.m.) was introduced on two days of this year's show. The total number of visitors surpassed 900,000. The Japanese government announced the "Income Doubling Plan" at the year-end of the previous year, and individual spending gradually increased. The so-called "3-C Period" was approaching the general public. People's dreams were to have a car, color TV and air-conditioner. Buoyed by the upturned economy, the star models were presented at the Motor Show. Many international products were also showcased. They were the Prince Skyline Sports Convertible designed by Michelotti, the Nissan Fairlady prototype, the Italian-style Toyopet Sports X, and the Daihatsu 700cc engine car.

==== 1962 ====
It was held from October 25 to November 7, 1962.

The highlight of this year's Motor Show was Honda's first automobile. The company has already earned a world-class reputation in motorcycle races such as the World Grand Prix, and unveiled its two models on the stage: The Honda Sports 360 and 500. This helped the event attract one million and more visitors for the first time. The street from Ginza to the Harumi venue was congested with more than 10,000 cars going to the motor show every day and the organizer was forced to change it to a one-way street. At the same time, maritime transport was introduced between Takeshiba Pier and Harumi. The exhibiting areas were extended to accommodate a total of 410 vehicles. A Technical Center also debuted in an out-door area at the show hosted by the Japan Automotive Service Equipment Association and others.

==== 1963 ====
It was held from October 26 to November 10, 1963.

"To respond to the coming liberalization of automobile import, Japanese carmakers displayed an array of new cars," newspapers reported in regard to the Tenth Motor Show. As part of the 10th anniversary program, the admission fee for the first day of the show was set at 500 yen (100 yen fee plus 400 yen donation for the Community Chest Center).

From this year's show, two halls were provided for passenger car exhibits to help passenger cars become the stars of the motor show. A test driving course was created in the south of the exhibition area, which became very popular among visitors. This suggested that the show should include "an experience-oriented event." Many cars designed by foreign car designers were also displayed at the show. Notably, Toyo Kogyo (former Mazda Motor Corp.) unveiled its rotary engine series, which the company reportedly had a hard time to develop. The company's advanced sports car fitted with the rotary engine was finally on the stage.

==== 1964 ====
It was held from September 26 to October 9, 1964.

The Nissan Fairlady 1500 (Datsun Sports 1500, SR310) and the Mazda Cosmo were introduced at this show, one month before the 1964 Summer Olympics.

Seeing market growth due to the liberalization of automobile import to be introduced in April next year, three foreign carmakers newly participated in the motor show this year. With this international move, the motor show was renamed from the All-Japan Motor Show to the Tokyo Motor Show. A press room was also created for foreign and domestic media. This year's show featured many GT and Coupé models rather than conventional four-door sedans, which reflected the desire for sporty cars in the minds of consumers. Toyota's third-generation Corona RT40 was also displayed at the show. The Corona series and its long-time rival, Nissan's Bluebird, through their side-by-side competition in the so-called "B-C Battle" in the market, have long played a key role in the development of Japan's motorization.

- Datsun Coupé 1500
- Mazda Cosmo prototype

==== 1965 ====
It was held from October 29 to November 11, 1965.

A feeling that the time of high economic growth had come was in the air. The 12th Tokyo Motor Show was held immediately after the October 1 introduction of the automobile import liberalization. For this year's motor show, Japanese carmakers thus emphasized sales promotion rather than presenting showy exhibits, although the show still included 157 new models. To cope with imported automobiles, luxury Japanese models were on display, including the Nissan President fitted with a 4,000 cc V8 engine, the new Nissan Cedric, and the V8-engined Toyota Crown model which was previously showcased at last year's show. In the small car category, a variety of new models were unveiled in the 800-1,000cc engine class, including Japan's first fastback model, the Colt 800, the Honda S800/N800, Subaru 1000, and Familia Coupé 1000. Personal cars, not intended for taxi usage, were also highlighted at the show.

==== 1966 ====
It was held from October 26 to November 8, 1966.

The 13th Tokyo Motor Show was held in 1966, the year of "The first year of My Car (one's own car)." As the driving force of the development of Japan's motorization, the Nissan Sunny and Toyota Corolla were unveiled at this year's show. Other carmakers also presented their new models in the 800-1,000cc engine class, heralding the "Era of Cars for Everyone." Amid the My Car boom, minivehicles fitted with under 660cc engines also earned popularity among consumers again. New minivehicle models such as Honda's N360, the Daihatsu Fellow, and Suzuki Fronte featured significantly improved performance, resulting in a strong presence among owners of conventional minivehicles. Notably, the Nissan Prince Royal, the first made-in-Japan limousine used by the emperor and empress, was unveiled at the show. Visitors were surprised at the vehicle's overwhelming body size and engine.

- Honda L800

==== 1967 ====
It was held from October 26 to November 8, 1967.

The 14th Tokyo Motor Show provided an opportunity for promoting traffic safety to society. A "Traffic Safety Corner" was created on the second floor of the 8th Hall (space for passenger cars) to allow visitors to experience tests. At the 2nd Hall, another promotion was conducted concerning the importance of the helmet. Although the number of exhibited vehicles slightly decreased to 655 units, compared to the previous year, attractive vehicles were on display. Toyota's Century, fitted with a V8-cylinder 3,000cc engine, was introduced as the company's flagship model. Nissan also unveiled its Bluebird 510. The vehicle features unique exterior design without triangle windows as well as a new independent 4-wheel suspension, which also became a popular model in the U.S. later. Toyo Kogyo displayed its rotary engine cars, the RX87 and RX85, as reference models.

==== 1968 ====
It was held from October 26 to November 11, 1968.

Japanese carmakers experienced industry-wide reorganization this year. Nissan, after the merger with Prince in 1966, announced a business tie-up with Fuji Heavy Industries. Toyota also formed a business alliance with Hino and Daihatsu. With this alliance, Hino stopped producing its Contessa passenger car and Hino vehicles vanished in the passenger car halls of the Tokyo Motor Show. As traffic safety and air-pollution became serious problems this year, the organizer provided a Safety Science Center in the 5th Hall at the motor show to promote seatbelts (with demonstration) and control of idling. A "Traffic Safety Room for Children" was also created for the first time. Among the exhibits, Toyota's Crown Hardtop (2-door model) and Corona Mark II (1600 and 1900) were the center of attraction. Other vehicles of interest included the Nissan Laurel, Skyline 2000GT powered by a V6 engine, Isuzu 117 Coupe, and Toyota's Sprinter Coupe.

- Nissan Skyline GT-R (first generation)

==== 1969 ====
It was held from October 24 to November 6, 1969.

The Tomei Expressway opened in March this year and the demand for high-speed driving was growing rapidly in Japan. Significant progress was seen in the performance of Japanese vehicles. The 16th Tokyo Motor Show was highlighted by an array of sports cars and vehicles for motor sports. At the same time, many show models were displayed in the futuristic "dream cars" and commuter model categories, which were developed under the key concepts of high-speed and safety. Notably, the president of the motor show Prince Takamatsu showed particular interest in such future cars displayed on the stages as Toyota's EX-I, II and III. Meanwhile, carmakers emphasized displays of technological developments at the show in response to recall problems reported in June this year. They also aggressively promoted countermeasures for some serious social issues: traffic safety and the prevention of air-pollution.

- Isuzu Bellett MX1600 concept
- Mitsubishi Galant GTO

=== 1970s ===
Tokyo Motor Show, 1970–79
No.	Year	Dates			Venue	Admission fees (incl. tax)	Area		Number of			Ref.
No.	Year	Start	End	Days	Venue	Admission fees (incl. tax)	Site	Exhibits	Exhibitors	Vehicles	Visitors	Ref.
17	§ 1970	Oct 30, 1970	Nov 12, 1970	14	Harumi	¥250 (charity ¥500)	134,967 m^{2} 1,452,770 sq ft	41,298 m^{2} 444,530 sq ft	274	792	1,452,900	
18	§ 1971	Oct 29, 1971	Nov 11, 1971	14	Harumi	¥250 (charity ¥500)	122,247 m^{2} 1,315,860 sq ft	33,550 m^{2} 361,100 sq ft	267	755	1,351,500	
19	§ 1972	Oct 23, 1972	Nov 5, 1972	14	Harumi	¥250 (charity ¥500)	108,103 m^{2} 1,163,610 sq ft	26,395 m^{2} 284,110 sq ft	218	559	1,261,400	
20	§ 1973	Oct 30, 1973	Nov 12, 1973	14	Harumi	¥300	115,720 m^{2} 1,245,600 sq ft	34,232 m^{2} 368,470 sq ft	215	690	1,223,000	
21	§ 1975	Oct 31, 1975	Nov 10, 1975	11	Harumi	¥500	108,074 m^{2} 1,163,300 sq ft	28,381 m^{2} 305,490 sq ft	165	626	981,400	
22	§ 1977	Oct 28, 1977	Nov 7, 1977	11	Harumi	¥600	117,500 m^{2} 1,265,000 sq ft	30,633 m^{2} 329,730 sq ft	203	704	992,100	
23	§ 1979	Nov 1, 1979	Nov 12, 1979	12	Harumi	¥700	117,500 m^{2} 1,265,000 sq ft	34,969 m^{2} 376,400 sq ft	184	800	1,003,100	

==== 1970 ====
It was held from October 30 to November 12, 1970.

Imported automobiles participated in the 17th Tokyo Motor Show for the first time. A total of 95 imported vehicles were exhibited by 33 foreign carmakers from 7 countries. The latest designs and advanced technologies of imported vehicles helped the Japan show to have a strong international flavor. On the other hand, Japanese carmakers presented a variety of vehicles ranging from sporty models (including minivehicles) prepared for high-speed driving, cars for leisure use and city cars, as well as advanced reference models (including electric vehicles) focusing on high safety standards and low exhaust emissions. This year Toyota released the Celica and Carina onto the market, while Nissan launched its front-engine, front-wheel-drive model, the Cherry, featuring an industry-first horizontally mounted engine layout. A "Safety and Pollution Protection Center" pavilion was newly created at the show to indicate that the automotive industry has launched into the challenge to improve safety and reduce exhaust emissions.

- Mazda RX-500 concept
- Toyota Celica (First generation)
- Toyota EX-7 concept
- Toyota Electronics Car concept

==== 1971 ====
The 18th Tokyo Motor Show, the second international motor show, attracted many more visitors from overseas countries than the previous year when capital transaction was liberalized in Japan's automotive sector in April this year. Exhibits of carmakers this year also focused on the challenges and solutions for safety and low-emission vehicles to respond to increasing concerns of traffic safety, air-pollution, and traffic jams in society. As for commercial vehicles, approval for exhibition was given to the under 3-ton class and a part of special-purpose vehicles only, which resulted in a passenger car oriented show this year. It was held from October 29 to November 11, 1971.

- Toyota SV-1 prototype
- Toyota Marinetta concept
- Toyota RV-1 concept

==== 1972 ====
The main focus of this year's show was the technological developments of safety vehicles and emission reduction, which were also the primary targets to be addressed. It was held from October 23 to November 5, 1972.

The main focus of this year's show was the technological developments of safety vehicles and emission reduction, which were also the primary targets to be addressed. The auto industry's challenging positions were highlighted throughout the show. To support this, a "Safety and Pollution Prevention Corner" was set up in the 1st Hall, while large commercial vehicles were eliminated from the exhibits again. Carmakers presented the latest technologies of low-emission vehicles, including the oxide catalyst (the three way catalyst was not available at that time) and Honda's CVCC engine, as well as Thermal Reactor technology developed by Mazda and Daihatsu. Meanwhile, visitors paid great attention to motor sport oriented cars such as a racecar specification model of the Nissan Skyline and Mazda Savanna RX-3. A lunar surface vehicle, developed jointly by Isuzu and GM, was also one of the star attraction.

- Mazda Chantez EV concept
- Nissan Skyline GT-R (Second generation)
- Datsun Sunny RE Prototype
- Toyota RV-2 concept
- Toyota ESV-2 concept

==== 1973 ====
To commemorate the 20th anniversary, the organizer prepared special events for the Tokyo Motor Show this year. They were the "Development of Vehicles," an easy explanation display of how vehicles have progressed, and "Man and Automobiles," a review of the role of automobiles in society. It was held from October 30 to November 12, 1973.

- Daihatsu EV1
- Toyota ESV concept
- Toyota Marinetta 10 trailer concept

==== 1975 ====
It was held from October 31 to November 10, 1975.

The 21st Tokyo Motor Show, the first event after it changed to an every-other-year cycle, was held under the theme of "Life on Wheels" to present the auto industry's clear visions and attitude toward environmental issues. The Theme Pavilion put on various displays to show the broad connection of daily life and automobiles, as well as the auto industry's contribution (as an export business) to the Japanese economy. A very rare presentation was also seen to show the various relationships between life and vehicles in the earlier days through such old vehicles as the 1918 "Detroit" electric vehicle and the 1929 Sumida bus. On the other hand, carmakers displayed the latest developments in environmental technology in order to comply with emission regulations. Toyota displayed the TTC-c/TTC-V system, while Nissan exhibited the NAPS system. The duration was shortened by 3 days to 11 days compared with the previous show. The exhibiting areas were also reduced to 5 Halls, which resulted in a reduction of visitors to the below-one-million-level for the first time since the 9th motor show.

- Toyota Century GT45 concept
- Toyota MP-1 concept

==== 1977 ====
It was held from October 28 to November 7, 1977.

This year's show saw a rush of new model releases of Japanese vehicles, which have succeeded in meeting exhaust emission regulations. The key slogan of the industry has changed from "low-emission" to "fuel saving." Star models included: Daihatsu Charade, fitted with the world's first 4-cycle 3-cylinder engine, which achieved a fuel economy of 19km-per-liter; as well as "fuel-saving" diesel-powered passenger cars such as the Nissan Cedric, Toyota Crown, and Isuzu Florian. This year Japan became the world's No.1 vehicle exporter, fueled by the boom of small cars due to the oil crisis. There was also a sign of an outbreak of trade conflict between Japan and Europe/America. Foreign brand vehicles thus were on display in a separate hall from Japanese vehicles at the motor show this year. The latest models occupied the foreign car hall, attracting many car enthusiasts. This helped the motor show to have a strong international flavor.

- Toyota CAL-1 concept

==== 1979 ====
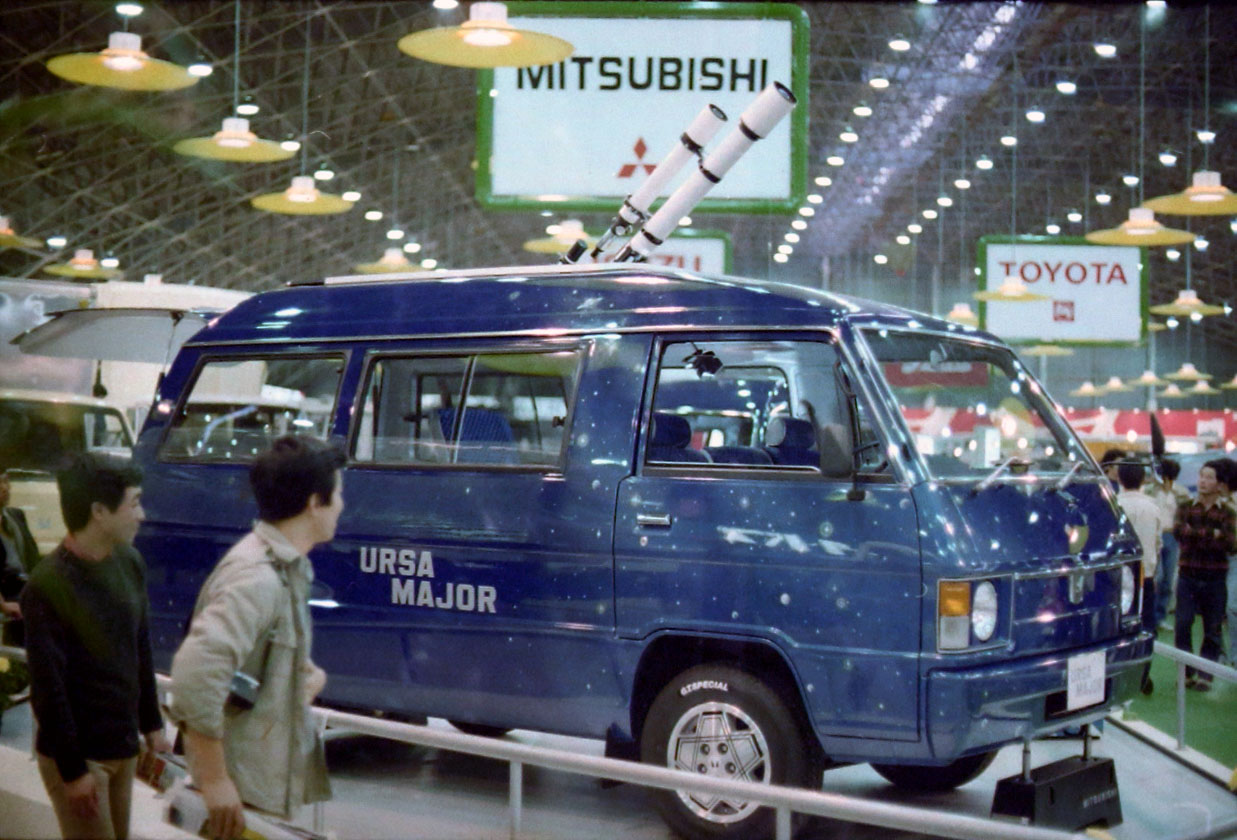
The Mitsubishi Ursa Major astronomical observation vehicle, based on the recently introduced second generation Mitsubishi Delica, exhibited at the 1979 Tokyo Motor Show

The theme was "Abundance Towards the 80s --Vehicles Connecting the World". It was held from November 1 to November 12, 1979.

Under the theme of "Abundance Towards the 80s --Vehicles Connecting the World--," the last motor show in the 70s was colored with aggressive visions toward the next decade. Despite the tough challenges of energy saving, carmakers actively presented new technologies at the 23rd Tokyo motor show. The highlighted vehicles were mostly equipped with turbo engines or diesel engines. At the Theme Hall, under the banner of "Japanese Engine Technologies," a total of 77 engines and cut-away models were displayed, ranging from aircraft engines used in World War II to rocket engines for spaceships. The organizer paid a great deal of attention to foreign carmakers due to growing concerns of trade conflict. This was reflected in the number of exhibits at the show. Exhibited foreign passenger cars numbered 123, 27 units more than the previous show. Foreign cars were grouped by country.

- Isuzu Piazza
- Toyota Sports 800 Gas Turbine Hybrid concept
- Toyota CX-80 (FCX-80) concept
- Toyota Family Wagon concept

=== 1980s ===
Tokyo Motor Show, 1981–89
No.	Year	Dates			Venue	Admission fees (incl. tax)	Area		Number of			Ref.
No.	Year	Start	End	Days	Venue	Admission fees (incl. tax)	Site	Exhibits	Exhibitors	Vehicles	Visitors	Ref.
24	§ 1981	Oct 30, 1981	Nov 10, 1981	12	Harumi	¥800	114,700 m^{2} 1,235,000 sq ft	34,332 m^{2} 369,550 sq ft	209	849	1,114,200	
25	§ 1983	Oct 28, 1983	Nov 8, 1983	12	Harumi	¥800	111,650 m^{2} 1,201,800 sq ft	35,130 m^{2} 378,100 sq ft	224	945	1,200,400	
26	§ 1985	Oct 31, 1985	Nov 11, 1985	12	Harumi	¥900	114,780 m^{2} 1,235,500 sq ft	40,734 m^{2} 438,460 sq ft	262	1,032	1,291,500	
27	§ 1987	Oct 29, 1987	Nov 9, 1987	12	Harumi	¥900	112,800 m^{2} 1,214,000 sq ft	38,662 m^{2} 416,150 sq ft	280	960	1,297,200	
28	§ 1989	Oct 26, 1989	Nov 6, 1989	12	Makuhari	¥1,000	173,820 m^{2} 1,871,000 sq ft	41,844 m^{2} 450,410 sq ft	338	818	1,924,200	

==== 1981 ====
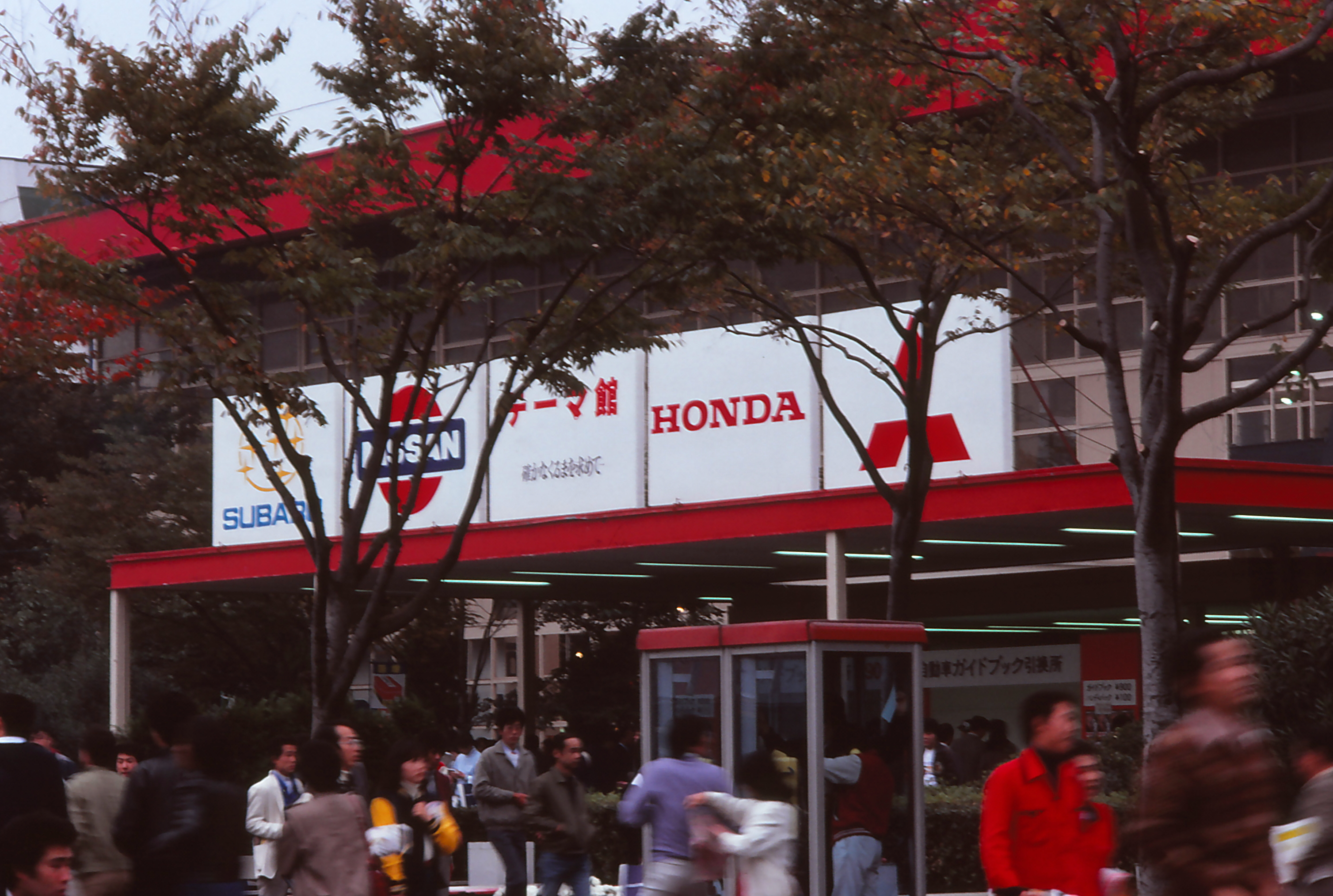
The entrance to the 1981 edition of the Tokyo Motor Show

This year's event was held from October 30 to November 10, 1981.

The world was struggling with low economic growth and instability. Carmakers, however, displayed an array of new models, reference models, and new technologies, making the motor show much more active. A notable trend was the front-engine, front-wheel-drive (FF) layout for small cars, the lightweight body of which mated with excellent aerodynamic features and helped the small car to achieve a high level of fuel efficiency. The turbo charger was also a highlight of the motor show. Nissan pioneered the installation of the turbo engine in the vehicle lineup, while Mitsubishi Motors set up turbo engine versions in a full-scale lineup this year. Even for a 1-liter engine car, Daihatsu Charade, a turbo version, the Charade Detomaso Turbo was displayed as a reference model at this year's motor show. Meanwhile, recreational vehicles (RVs) have increased in the market in terms of both number and type. Automobiles were increasingly becoming diverse as users wanted various functions in the car. The number of exhibited vehicles was 849 units, a record-high, while the number of visitors rose to 1,114,200 people.

- Mitsubishi Pajero
- Suzuki CV1
- Toyota DV-1
- Toyota EX-11
- Toyota SV-2

==== 1983 ====
The theme was "Vehicles: Past, Present, and Future". It was held from October 28 to November 8, 1983.

Amid the world economy facing hard times over the years, Japanese domestic demand was also sluggish. Exhibitors at the Tokyo Motor Show this year, however, presented abundant displays of prototypes and reference models to visitors. These vehicles adopted new technologies which were soon to be used in production vehicles. Proactive proposals for near-future vehicles were also found in such exhibits. Exhibited foreign passenger cars increased by 50% compared with the previous motor show. Foreign exhibitors numbered 28 companies. Combined number of exhibited vehicles with Japanese vehicles totaled 945 units, an all-time high. The number of visitors reached 1,204,000 people, including 26,625 foreign visitors. In commemoration of the motor show's 25th anniversary, the Theme Hall featured "Vehicles: Past, Present, and Future." The special showcase provided displays and easy explanations of the possibility of technologies in vehicle development, as well as how the present high technologies have been developed, and how new materials and electronics would be utilized in future technology.

- Toyota FX-1
- Toyota SV-3
- Toyota TAC3

==== 1985 ====
The theme was "The Culture of Motoring: The New Generation of Vehicles". It was held from October 31 to November 11, 1985.

- Nissan MID4
- Toyota AXV
- Toyota FXV

==== 1987 ====
It was held from October 29 to November 9, 1987.

- Nissan MID4-II
- Toyota AXV-II
- Toyota EV-30
- Toyota FXV-II
- Toyota GTV

==== 1989 ====
The theme was "Freedom of Mobility - A Taste of Real Life and Luxury". It was held from October 26 to November 6, 1989.

- Aston Martin Virage
- Mazda AZ-550 Sports (Type A, B and C)
- Ferrari 348
- Ferrari Mythos concept
- Honda NSX
- Jiotto Caspita
- Lotus Elan
- Mazda Carol
- Mitsubishi GTO
- Mitsubishi HSR-II
- Nissan Figaro
- Nissan S-Cargo
- Porsche Panamericana
- Suzuki Cappuccino
- Subaru Alcyone SVX
- Toyota MR2
- Toyota Previa
- Toyota Sera
- Toyota Celsior

=== 1990s ===
Tokyo Motor Show, 1991–99
No.	Year	Dates			Venue	Admission fees (incl. tax)	Area		Number of			Ref.
No.	Year	Start	End	Days	Venue	Admission fees (incl. tax)	Site	Exhibits	Exhibitors	Vehicles	Visitors	Ref.
29	§ 1991	Oct 25, 1991	Nov 8, 1991	15	Makuhari	¥1,200	210,300 m^{2} 2,264,000 sq ft	45,635 m^{2} 491,210 sq ft	336	783	2,018,500	
30	§ 1993	Oct 22, 1993	Nov 5, 1993	15	Makuhari	¥1,200	211,300 m^{2} 2,274,000 sq ft	46,924 m^{2} 505,090 sq ft	357	770	1,810,600	
31	§ 1995	Oct 27, 1995	Nov 8, 1995	13	Makuhari	¥1,200	211,300 m^{2} 2,274,000 sq ft	47,941 m^{2} 516,030 sq ft	361	787	1,523,300	
32	§ 1997	Oct 24, 1997	Nov 5, 1997	13	Makuhari	¥1,200	211,300 m^{2} 2,274,000 sq ft	48,693 m^{2} 524,130 sq ft	337	771	1,515,400	
33	§ 1999	Oct 22, 1999	Nov 3, 1999	13	Makuhari	¥1,200	211,300 m^{2} 2,274,000 sq ft	45,394 m^{2} 488,620 sq ft	294	757	1,386,400	

==== 1991 ====
The theme was "Discovering a New Relationship: People, Cars and the Earth as One". It was held from October 25 to November 8, 1991.

- Toyota AXV-III concept
- Toyota AXV-IV concept
- Toyota Avalon (Concept)
- Toyota Fun Runner concept
- Kia Sportage prototype

==== 1993 ====
The theme was "Car Innovation in Free, Natural and Comfortable Ways". It was held from October 22 to November 5, 1993.

- Ford Mustang
- Nissan Skyline GT-R (R33)
- Suzuki Wagon R (first generation)
- Toyota AXV-V concept
- Toyota EV-50 prototype
- Toyota Mega Cruiser prototype
- Toyota Raum concept
- Toyota Raum-II concept

==== 1995 ====
The theme was "Dream the Dream, a Car with That Feel". It was held from October 27 to November 8, 1995.

- Honda S2000 concept
- Subaru Streega concept
- Toyota FLV concept
- Toyota Fun Runner II concept
- Toyota Hybrid Electric Bus concept
- Toyota Moguls concept
- Toyota MRJ concept
- Toyota Prius

==== 1997 ====
The theme was "One World. One People. One Show". It was held from October 24 to November 5, 1997.

- BMW Z07 concept
- Honda J-MW concept
- Mercedes-Benz Maybach concept
- Toyota FCEV
- Toyota Funcargo concept
- Toyota Funcoupe concept
- Toyota Funtime concept
- Toyota NC250
- Volkswagen W12 Syncro

==== 1999 ====
The theme was "Eye to the future. Changing vehicles for the earth". It was held from October 22 to November 3, 1999.

- Bugatti EB18/4 concept
- Chevrolet Triax
- Daihatsu EZ-U concept
- Daihatsu Micros concept
- Daihatsu Naked
- Daihatsu SP-4 concept
- Ford 021C
- Honda FCX
- Honda Fuya-Jo
- Honda Neukom
- Honda Spocket
- Isuzu ZXS concept
- Isuzu Kai
- Lexus Sport Coupe concept
- Mazda RX-Evolv concept
- Mitsubishi SUW series
- Nissan AXY
- Nissan Cypact
- Nissan XVL
- Subaru Legacy Blitzen
- Subaru Fleet-X
- Suzuki EV-Sport
- Suzuki MR Wagon prototype
- Suzuki PU-3
- Toyota Celica Cruising Deck concept
- Toyota HV-M4
- Toyota NCSV
- Toyota Opa prototype
- Toyota Open Deck
- Toyota Origin
- Toyota WiLL Vi

=== 2000s ===
Tokyo Motor Show, 2000–09
No.	Year	Dates			Venue	Admission fees (incl. tax)	Area		Number of			Ref.
No.	Year	Start	End	Days	Venue	Admission fees (incl. tax)	Site	Exhibits	Exhibitors	Vehicles	Visitors	Ref.
34	§ 2000	Oct 31, 2000	Nov 4, 2000	5	Makuhari	¥1,000	133,000 m^{2} 1,430,000 sq ft	24,822 m^{2} 267,180 sq ft	133	248	177,900	
35	§ 2001	Oct 26, 2001	Nov 7, 2001	13	Makuhari	¥1,200	211,300 m^{2} 2,274,000 sq ft	42,119 m^{2} 453,370 sq ft	281	709	1,276,900	
36	§ 2002	Oct 29, 2002	Nov 3, 2002	6	Makuhari	¥1,000	133,000 m^{2} 1,430,000 sq ft	24,837 m^{2} 267,340 sq ft	110	224	211,100	
37	§ 2003	Oct 24, 2003	Nov 5, 2003	13	Makuhari	¥1,200	211,300 m^{2} 2,274,000 sq ft	40,839 m^{2} 439,590 sq ft	268	612	1,420,400	
38	§ 2004	Nov 2, 2004	Nov 7, 2004	6	Makuhari	¥1,000	133,000 m^{2} 1,430,000 sq ft	24,465 m^{2} 263,340 sq ft	113	206	248,600	
39	§ 2005	Oct 21, 2005	Nov 6, 2005	17	Makuhari	¥1,200	211,300 m^{2} 2,274,000 sq ft	40,211 m^{2} 432,830 sq ft	239	571	1,512,100	
40	§ 2007	Oct 26, 2007	Nov 11, 2007	17	Makuhari	¥1,300	211,300 m^{2} 2,274,000 sq ft	44,587 m^{2} 479,930 sq ft	241	517	1,425,800	
41	§ 2009	Oct 23, 2009	Nov 4, 2009	13	Makuhari	¥1,300	54,000 m^{2} 580,000 sq ft	21,823 m^{2} 234,900 sq ft	128	261	614,400	

==== 2000 ====
The theme was "Vehicle of Character Across the World, Building Our Future". It was held from October 31 to November 4, 2000.

==== 2001 ====
The theme was "Open the Door! The Automobile's Bright Future". It was held from October 26 to November 7, 2001.

The 2001 show saw the following introductions:

- Daihatsu Muse
- Daihatsu Copen
- Daihatsu FF Ultra
- Honda Bulldog concept
- Honda Unibox concept
- Hyundai TB Concept Car
- Isuzu Zen concept
- Mazda RX-8
- Mazda Secret Hideout concept
- Mercedes F400 Carving concept
- Mini Cooper S
- Mitsubishi CZ2 concept
- Mitsubishi CZ3 concept
- Mitsubishi Spaceliner concept
- Mitsubishi SUP concept
- Nissan GT-R Concept
- Nissan mm
- Nissan Fairlady Z Z33
- Nissan Ideo concept
- Nissan Kino concept
- Nissan Nails concept
- Toyota DMT
- Toyota FXS concept
- Toyota ist
- Toyota Pod concept
- Toyota Will VC
- Volkswagen W12

==== 2002 ====
The theme was "Sense the Evolution - Commercial Vehicles on Stage". It was held from October 29 to November 3, 2002.

==== 2003 ====
The theme was "The Challenge: Driving Toward A Better Future". It was held from October 24 to November 5, 2003.

- Daihatsu UFE-II
- Honda HSC
- Honda IMAS
- Honda Kiwami
- Hyundai Neos-II
- Jeep Treo
- Lexus LF-S
- Lexus LF-X
- Mazda Ibuki
- Mercedes-Benz F500 Mind
- Mitsubishi Se-ro
- Nissan Conran Cube
- Nissan Effis
- Nissan Fuga concept
- Nissan Jikoo
- Nissan Redigo
- Nissan Serenity
- Subaru B9 Scrambler
- Subaru R1e concept
- Suzuki Landbreeze
- Suzuki Mobile Terrace
- Suzuki S-Ride
- Toyota CS&S concept
- Toyota Fine-N concept
- Toyota NLSV concept
- Toyota PM concept
- Toyota SU-HV1 concept

==== 2004 ====
The theme was "Vehicles for People. Vehicles as Partner". It was held from November 2 to November 7, 2004.

- Toyota Hiace Sound Satellite concept
- Toyota Regius Ace My Kart Factory
- Toyota Welcab concept

==== 2005 ====
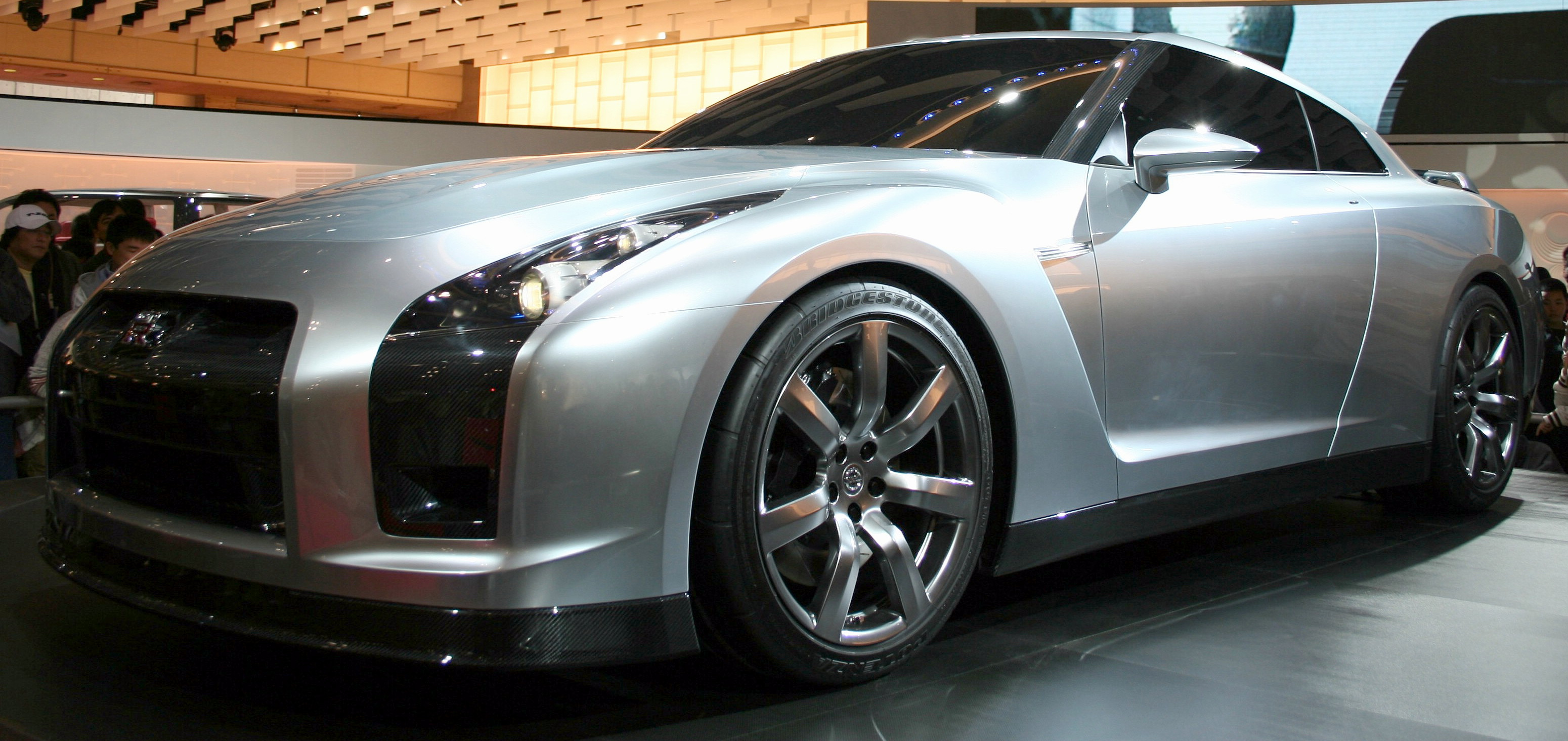
Nissan GT-R Prototype at the 2005 Tokyo Motor Show

The theme was "Driving Tomorrow!' from Tokyo". It was held from October 21 to November 6, 2005.

The 2005 show saw the following introductions:

- Audi Shooting Brake
- Chrysler Akino
- Daihatsu Costa
- Daihatsu UFE-III
- Ferrari GG50
- Honda FCX
- Honda Sports4
- Honda WOW
- Hyundai Neos-3
- Lexus LF-Sh
- Mercedes-Benz F600
- Mini Concept Tokyo
- Mitsubishi Concept D:5
- Mitsubishi i
- Nissan Amenio
- Nissan Foria
- Nissan Note Adidas
- Nissan Pivo
- Nissan GT-R Proto
- Subaru B5-TPH
- Suzuki Ionis
- Suzuki LC
- Suzuki PX
- Toyota Estima
- Toyota Fine-X
- Toyota FSC
- Toyota i-swing
- Volkswagen EcoRacer

==== 2007 ====
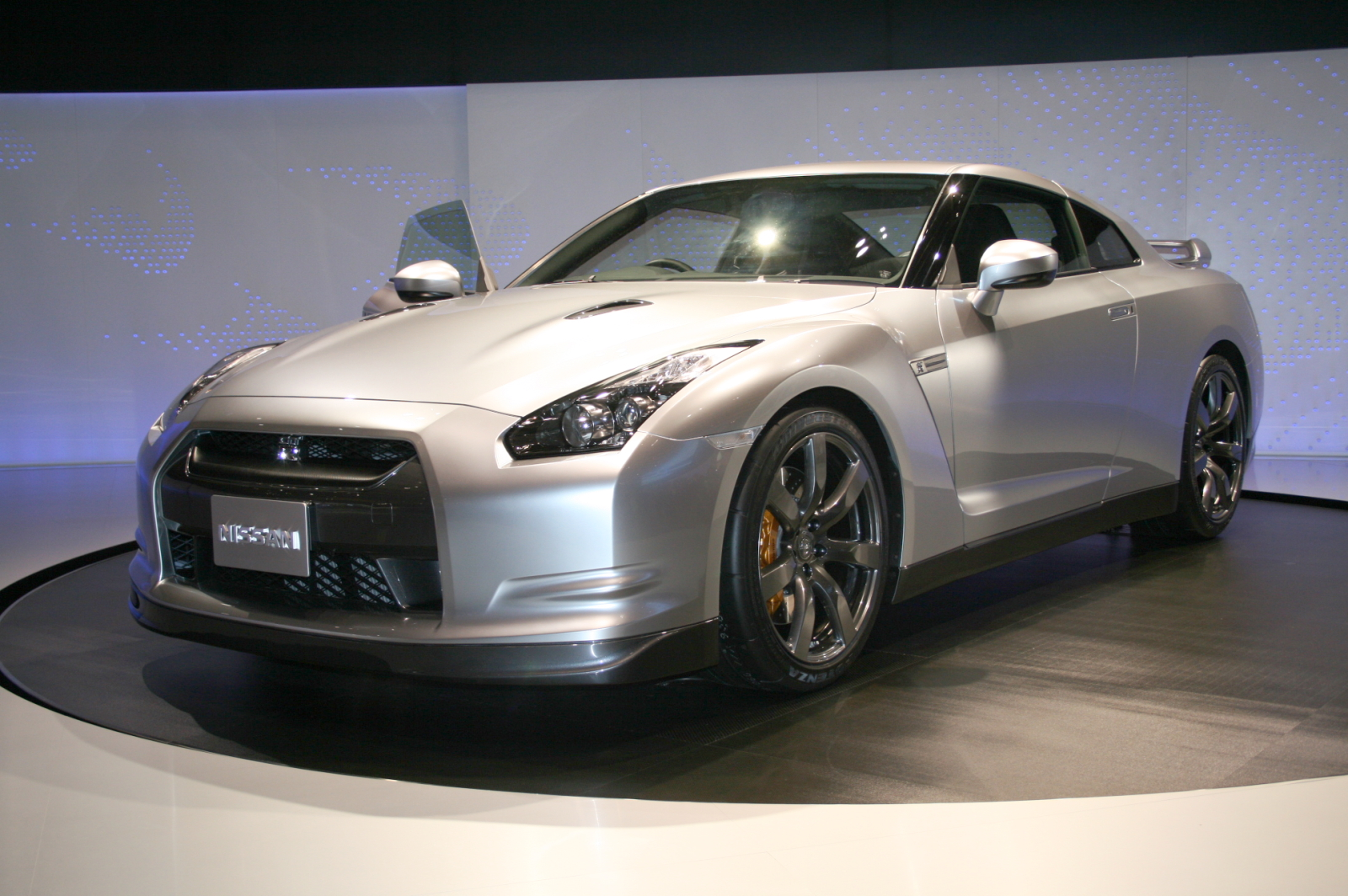
The 2007 TMS saw world premiere to the Nissan GT-R

The theme was "Catch the News, Touch the Future". It began on Friday, October 26 and ran for 17 days.

The 2007 show saw the following introductions:

- Audi metroproject quattro
- Daihatsu Mud Master concept
- Honda CR-Z concept
- Honda Inspire
- Honda Puyo
- Lexus LF-Xh
- Mazda Taiki
- Mitsubishi Concept-ZT
- Mitsubishi Lancer Evolution X
- Nissan GT-R
- Nissan NV200 concept
- Nissan Pivo 2
- Nissan Round Box
- Nissan X-Trail
- Subaru G4e
- Subaru Impreza WRX STI (GR chassis)
- Suzuki Pixy + SSC concept
- Suzuki X-Head
- Toyota Hi-CT concept
- Toyota RiN concept
- Toyota 1/X concept
- Yamaha Tesseract concept

===== Alternative propulsion =====
Hybrid and electric vehicles dominated the 2007 Tokyo Motor Show.

Concepts for new hybrids, plug-in hybrids, electric vehicles from Japan's leading automakers are now on display at the Tokyo Motor Show. As one example, Toyota Motor Corporation introduced its 1/X (pronounced "one-Xth") concept vehicle, a Prius-like sedan that tips the scales at a third of the weight of the Prius and obtains double the Prius' fuel economy. The vehicle cuts its weight by using carbon-fiber-reinforced plastic in its frame and boosts its fuel economy with a small plug-in hybrid powertrain that can be fueled with either gasoline or E85, a blend of 85% ethanol and 15% gasoline. Toyota's other plug-in hybrid concept, the Hi-CT, is a small, boxy, two-door vehicle aimed at young car buyers. In addition, Toyota's luxury brand, Lexus, introduced its next-generation hybrid sport utility vehicle, the LF-Xh, an all-wheel-drive vehicle powered by a V6 engine teamed up with a high-output electric motor.

General Motors, Ford, Chrysler and Hyundai did not attend the show.

Among the other automakers, Honda Motor Company, Ltd., unveiled the CR-Z, a "next-generation lightweight sports car" that features Honda's hybrid electric drivetrain, and the PUYO, another small, boxy vehicle, powered by a fuel cell. Honda will also unveil the one-wheeled scooter transport, the Honda U3-X.

Mitsubishi Motors Corporation introduced a Beetle-like electric vehicle with in-wheel electric motors, called the i MiEV Sport, which even has a solar panel on its roof. Nissan unveiled the Pivo 2, a small electric vehicle with a lithium-ion battery pack and wheel motors.

But Japanese automakers weren't the only ones unveiling clean car concepts in Tokyo. Audi arrived with its "Metroproject Quattro," a plug-in hybrid with a direct-injection, turbocharged, 150 hp (112 kW) gasoline engine mounted up front and a 30-kilowatt motor on its rear axle. The concept vehicle employs a lithium-ion battery pack that allows it to run on electric power only.

There is also the Gran Turismo 5: Prologue simulator that can use by visitors, and there is a gradual unveiling of in-game versions of cars such as the Mitsubishi Lancer Evolution X, Nissan GT-R, and Subaru Impreza WRX STI.

==== 2009 ====
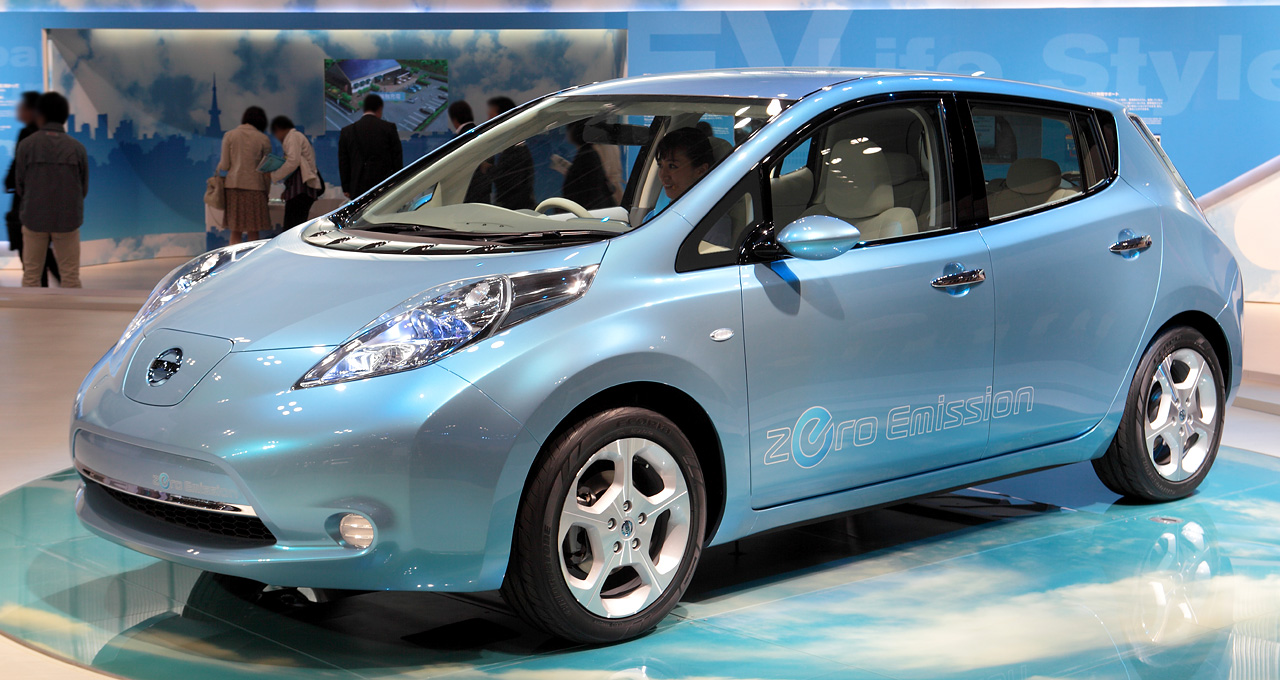
Nissan Leaf exhibited at the 2009 Show

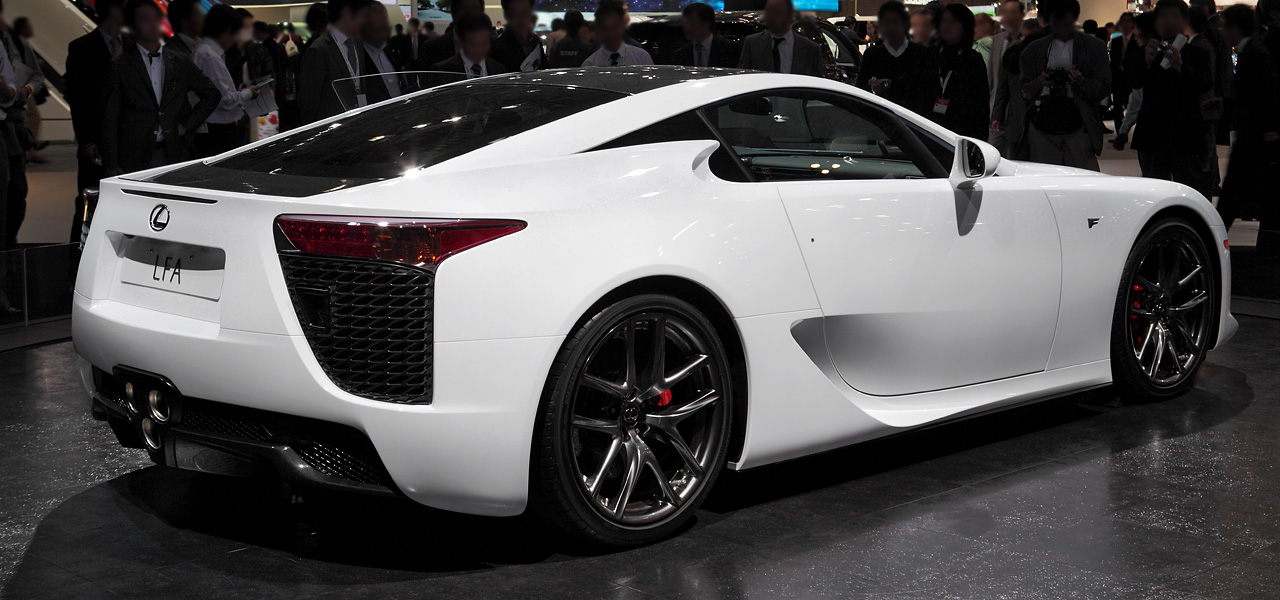
Lexus LF-A exhibited at the 2009 Show

It was held from Oct. 23 (Fri.) - Nov. 4 (Wed.), 2009.

The following were introduced at the 2009 show:

- Honda CR-Z pre-production concept
- Honda EV-N concept
- Honda Skydeck concept
- Honda VFR1200F motorcycle
- 2010 Honda Stepwgn
- Lexus LFA
- Lotus Exige Scura/Stealth
- Mitsubishi i MiEV Cargo
- 2011 Nissan Fuga
- Nissan Land Glider concept
- Nissan Leaf
- 2010 Volkswagen Polo GTI
- Nissan Roox
- Subaru Exiga 2.0T STI
- Subaru Hybrid Tourer concept
- Subaru Impreza WRX STI Carbon
- Suzuki Swift Plug-in Hybrid concept
- Toyota FT-86 Concept
- Toyota FT-EV II concept
- Toyota Prius Plug-In Hybrid Concept

=== 2010s ===
Tokyo Motor Show, 2011–19
No.	Year	Theme	Dates			Venue	Admission fees (incl. tax)	Area		Number of			Ref.
No.	Year	Theme	Start	End	Days	Venue	Admission fees (incl. tax)	Site	Exhibits	Exhibitors	Vehicles	Visitors	Ref.
42	§ 2011	Mobility can change the world	Dec 2, 2011	Dec 11, 2011	10	Big Sight	¥1,500	82,660 m^{2} 889,700 sq ft	35,187 m^{2} 378,750 sq ft	174	402	842,600	
43	§ 2013	Compete! And shape a new future	Nov 23, 2013	Dec 1, 2013	10	Big Sight	¥1,500	82,660 m^{2} 889,700 sq ft	38,293 m^{2} 412,180 sq ft	178	426	902,800	
44	§ 2015	Your heart will race	Oct 29, 2015	Nov 8, 2015	11	Big Sight	¥1,500	82,660 m^{2} 889,700 sq ft	38,354 m^{2} 412,840 sq ft	160	417	812,500	
45	§ 2017	Beyond the motor	Oct 29, 2017	Nov 5, 2017	10	Big Sight	¥1,500	89,660 m^{2} 965,100 sq ft	39,708 m^{2} 427,410 sq ft	153	380	771,200	
46	§ 2019	Open future	Oct 24, 2019	Nov 4, 2019	12	Big Sight	¥2,000	80,520 m^{2} 866,700 sq ft	30,467 m^{2} 327,940 sq ft	192		1,300,900	

==== 2011 ====
The theme was "Mobility can change the world." It was held from Dec. 2 (Fri.) - Dec. 11 (Sun.), 2011.

- Audi A1 Sportback
- BMW ActiveHybrid 5
- BMW Alpina B3 GT3
- BMW Alpina B6 BiTurbo Coupé
- Honda AC-X
- Honda EV Ster
- Honda Micro Commuter Concept
- Honda N-Box
- Honda RC-E
- Lexus GS450h
- Mazda Takeri
- Nissan Pivo 3
- Subaru BRZ
- Toyota 86
- Toyota FCV-R concept
- Toyota Fun-Vii
- Toyota FT-EV III
- Toyota Aqua
- Volkswagen Cross Coupe
- Volkswagen Passat Alltrack

==== 2013 ====
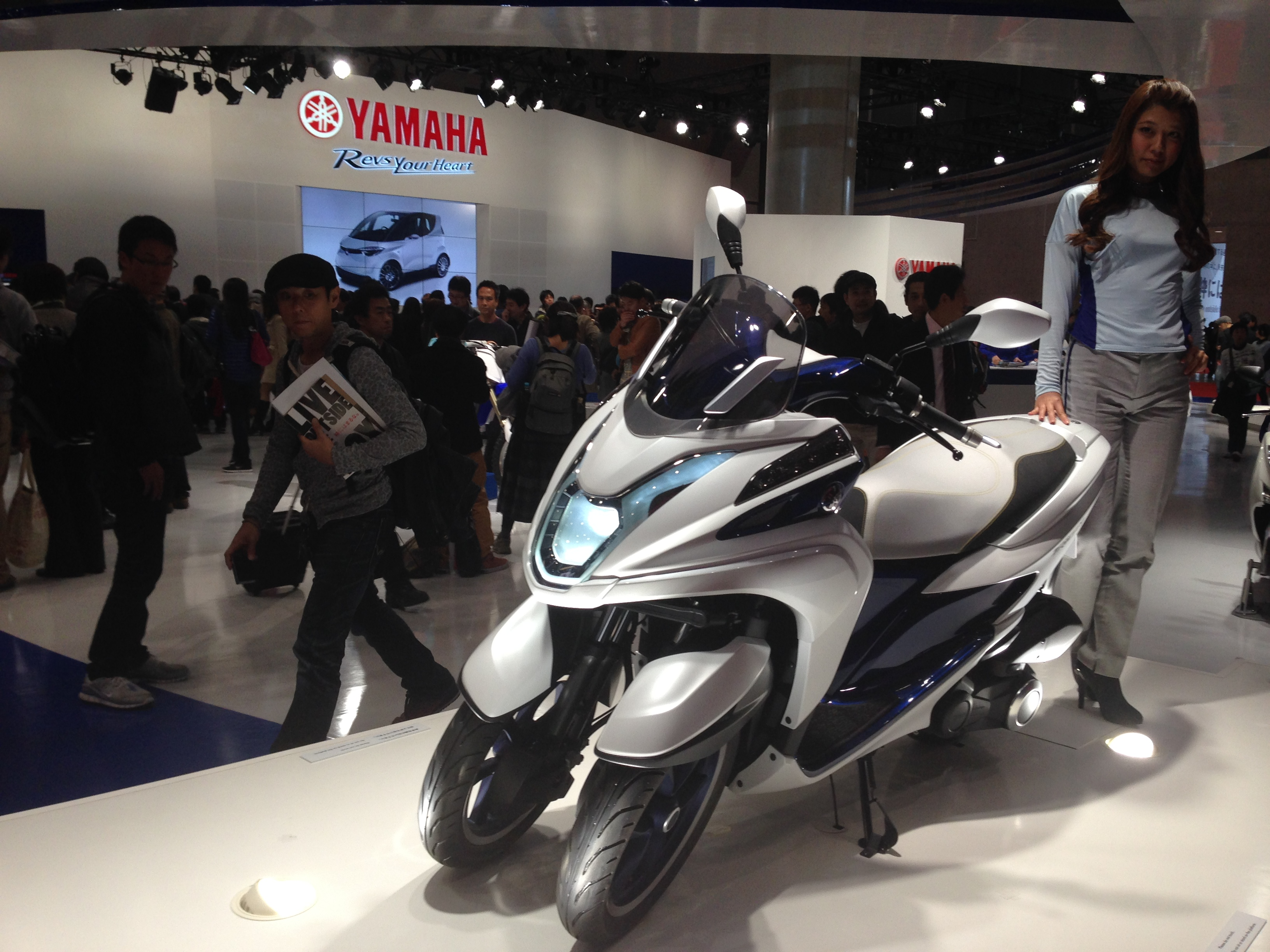
Yamaha Tricity Concept - Tokyo Motor Show 2013

The theme was "Compete! And shape a new future." It was held from Nov. 22 (Fri.) - Dec. 1 (Sun.), 2013.

- Alpina B4
- BMW 4 Series Convertible (F33)
- Honda S660 prototype
- Subaru Cross Sport Design Concept
- Toyota FT-86 Open Concept
- Toyota JPN Taxi Concept
- Yamaha MOTIV concept
- Yamaha Tricity

==== 2015 ====
The theme was “Your heart will race.” It was held from October 29 (Thu.) - November 8 (Sun.), 2015.

- Daihatsu D-Base concept
- Daihatsu Hinata concept
- Daihatsu Noriori concept
- Daihatsu Tempo concept
- Porsche Macan GTS
- Toyota FCV Plus concept
- Toyota S-FR concept
- Toyota Kikai concept
- Yamaha Sports Ride Concept

==== 2017 ====
The theme was "Beyond the motor". It was held from October 27 (Fri.) - November 5 (Sun.), 2017.

- Daihatsu Cast Activa
- Daihatsu Cast Style
- Daihatsu DN Compagno
- Daihatsu DN Multisix
- Daihatsu DN Pro Cargo
- Daihatsu DN Trec
- Daihatsu DN U-Space
- E-Fuso Vision One
- Honda Clarity Plug-In Hybrid
- Honda Legend Hybrid
- Honda Odyssey Absolute Hybrid
- Honda S660 "Special β #komorebi edition"
- Honda Sports EV Concept
- Lexus GS F "F 10th Anniversary Limited 500"
- Lexus LS+ Concept
- Lexus RC F "F 10th Anniversary Limited 500"
- Mazda Kai Concept
- Mazda Vision Coupé Concept
- Mitsubishi Eclipse Cross
- Mitsubishi eK Custom "Active Gear"
- Mitsubishi eK Space "Active Gear"
- Mitsubishi e-Evolution Concept
- Nissan e-NV200 Fridge Concept
- Nissan IMx Concept
- Nissan Leaf Nismo Concept
- Nissan NV350 Paramedic Concept
- Nissan Serena e-Power Highway Star
- Nissan Serena Nismo
- Nissan Skyline Hybrid
- Subaru BRZ STI Sport
- Subaru WRX STI S208
- Subaru VIZIZ Performance Concept
- Suzuki Carry Open-Air Market Concept
- Suzuki e-Survivor Concept
- Suzuki Spacia Concept
- Suzuki Spacia Custom Concept
- Suzuki Xbee Concept
- Suzuki Xbee Outdoor Adventure Concept
- Suzuki Xbee Street Adventure Concept
- Toyota Century (G60)
- Toyota Concept-i Ride
- Toyota Crown Concept
- Toyota Fine-Comfort Ride Concept
- Toyota GR HV Sports Concept
- Toyota JPN Taxi
- Toyota Sora Fuel Cell Bus
- Toyota Tj Cruiser Concept
- Yamaha Cross Hub Concept
- Yamaha Motobot Ver.2 Concept
- Yamaha Motoroid Concept
- Yamaha MWC-4 Concept
- Yamaha Niken
- Zagato Iso Rivolta Vision Gran Turismo

==== 2019 ====
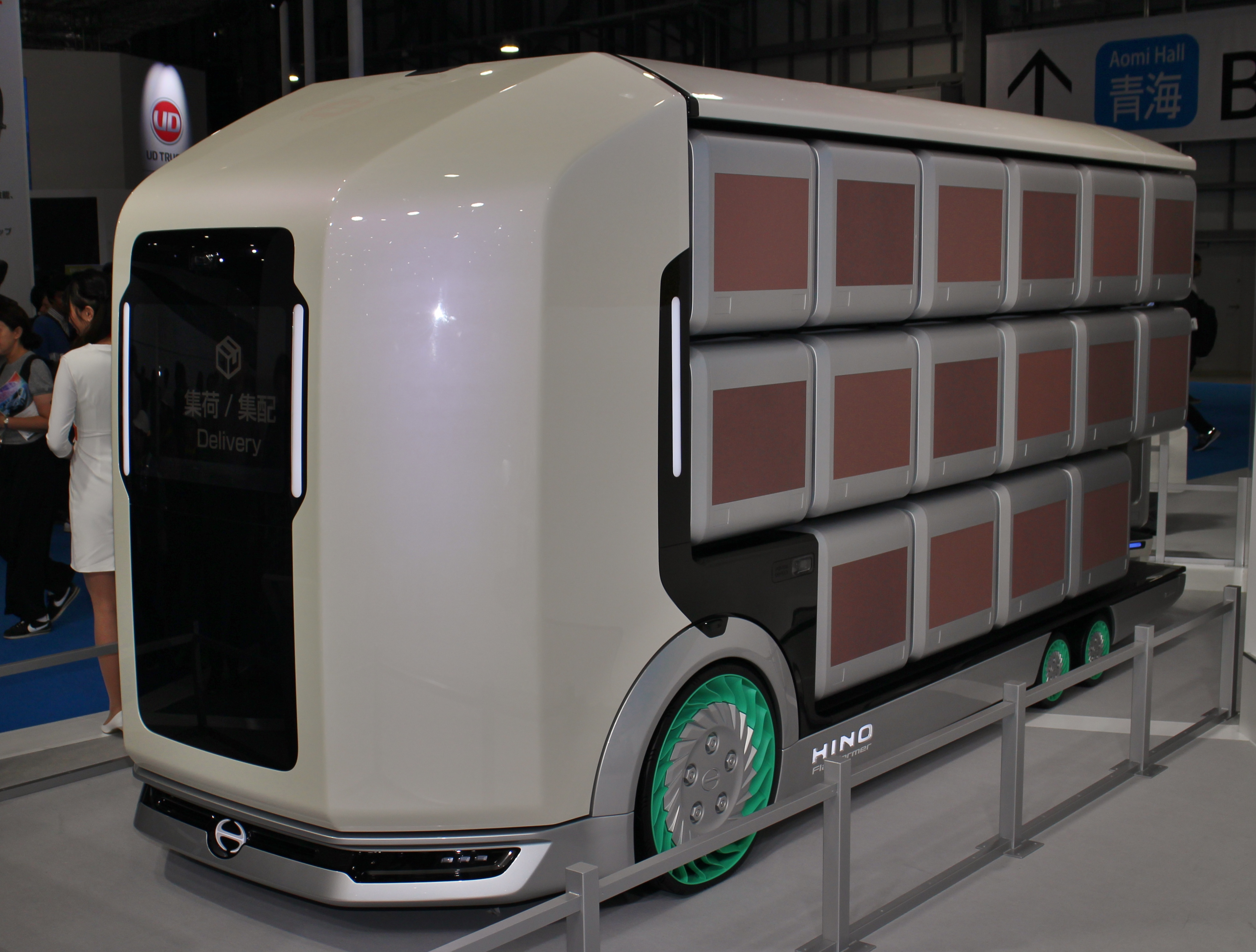
The Hino Flatformer concept co-developed with REE Automotive

The theme is "Open Future". It is held from October 24 (Thu.) - November 4 (Mon.), 2019.

- Alpine A110S
- Alpina XD3 Allrad
- Alpina XD4 Allrad
- Alpina B3 Limousine Allrad
- Alpina B7 langversion Allrad
- Daihatsu IcoIco
- Daihatsu Rocky
- Daihatsu TsumuTsumu
- Daihatsu Waiwai
- Daihatsu WakuWaku
- Hino Flatformer concept
- Honda e
- Honda Fit
- Lexus LF-30 Electrified
- Mazda MX-30
- Mitsubishi ASX
- Mitsubishi MI-TECH Concept
- Mitsubishi Super Height K-Wagon Concept
- Nissan Ariya Concept
- Nissan IMk Concept
- Nissan GT-R 50th Anniversary Edition
- Nissan GT-R Nismo
- Nissan Fairlady Z 50th Anniversary Edition
- Nissan Skyline Facelift
- Renault Lutecia
- Renault Mégane R.S
- Subaru Levorg Prototype
- Suzuki Hustler concept
- Suzuki WAKU Spo
- Suzuki Hanare
- Toyota LQ Concept
- Toyota Mirai Concept
- Toyota Ultra-Compact BEV

=== 2020s ===
Japan Mobility Show
No.	Year	Theme	Dates			Venue	Admission fees (incl. tax)	Number of		
No.	Year	Theme	Start	End	Days	Venue	Admission fees (incl. tax)	Exhibitors	Visitors	Ref.
47	§ 2023	Discover a future you can’t wait to navigate	Oct 26, 2023	Nov 5, 2023	11	Big Sight	¥3,000	479	1,112,000	
48	§ 2025	A unique opportunity to explore mobility's future!	Oct 30, 2025	Nov 9, 2025	11	Big Sight	¥2,700	522	–	

==== 2021 ====
Due to the COVID-19 pandemic in Tokyo, the 2021 Tokyo Motor Show was cancelled. It is the first time the show was not held as scheduled since it started in 1954.

==== 2023 ====
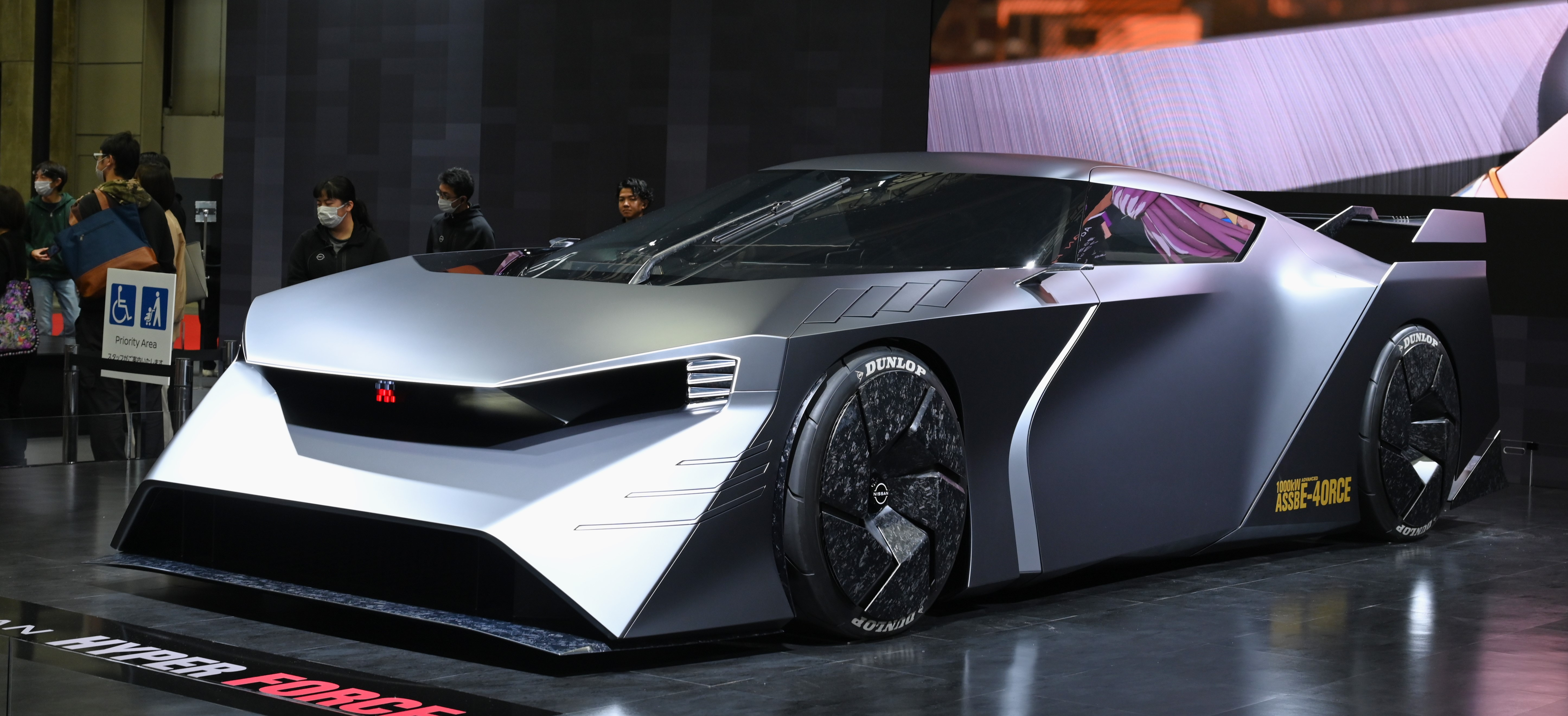
Nissan Hyper Force Concept - Japan Mobility Show 2023

In 2022, based on increased attendance at the 2019 TMS, JAMA announced the next event would not focus exclusively on automobiles and proposed a rebranding to Japan All-Industry Show. For 2023, the event is now the Japan Mobility Show, which was held from October 26 to November 5.

- BMW X2 M35i
- BMW iX2
- BMW iX5 HODROGEN
- BMW Vision Neue Klasse Concept
- BYD Seal
- BYD Dolphin
- BYD Atto 3
- Daihatsu Vision Copen Concept
- Daihatsu me:MO Concept
- Daihatsu UNIFORM Truck Concept
- Daihatsu UNIFORM Cargo Concept
- Daihatsu OSANPO Concept
- Denza D9
- Honda Prelude Concept
- Honda Prologue
- Honda Sustaina-C Concept
- Honda Pocket Concept
- Honda CI-MEV Concept
- Honda Autonomous Work Vehicle
- Honda Avator Robot
- Honda UNI-ONE
- Honda Cruise • Origin Concept
- Honda e-MTB Concept
- Honda SC e: Concept
- Honda Motocompacto
- Honda N-VAN e:
- Infiniti Vision Qe Concept
- Isuzu GIGA FUEL CELL
- Isuzu ELF ev
- Lexus LF-ZC Concept
- Lexus LF-ZL Concept
- Lexus RZ Outdoor Concept
- Lexus ROV Concept
- Mitsubishi D:X Concept
- Mitsubishi Triton
- Mitsubishi Triton Rally Car
- Mitsubishi Delica Support Car
- Mitsubishi Fuso eCanter Tipper
- Mitsubishi Fuso eCanter Garbage Truck
- Mitsubishi Fuso Super Great
- Mazda ICONIC SP Concept
- Mazda Roadster
- MIH Project X Concept
- Mercedes-Benz EQG Concept
- Nissan Hyper Tourer Concept
- Nissan Hyper Force Concept
- Nissan Hyper Punk Concept
- Nissan Hyper Urban Concept
- Nissan Hyper Adventure Concept
- Nissan Sakura 90th anniversary
- Nissan Aura 90th anniversary
- Nissan Note 90th anniversary
- Nissan Leaf 90th anniversary
- Nissan X-Trail 90th anniversary
- Nissan Serena 90th anniversary
- Nissan Kicks 90th anniversary
- Nissan GT-R NISMO Special edition
- Nissan Fairlady Z NISMO
- Nissan Skyline Nismo
- Suzuki Swift Concept
- Suzuki Spacia Concept
- Suzuki Spacia Custom Concept
- Suzuki Hydorogen Engine BURGMAN Motorcycles
- Suzuki e-choinori Scooter
- Suzuki MOQBA
- Suzuki SUZU-RIDE
- Suzuki SUZU-CARGO
- Suzuki Suzuki GO
- Suzuki e-PO
- Suzuki Small e-outboard concept, electric outboard motor
- Suzuki eVX Concept
- Suzuki eWX Concept
- Suzuki e EVERY Concept
- Suzuki Wagon R CBG
- Subaru Air mobility Concept
- Subaru Sport mobility Concept
- Subaru Levorg Layback Limited EX
- Subaru Solterra ET-HS
- Subaru Crosstrek Limited
- Subaru Forester X-Edition
- Sony Honda Mobility Afeela Prototype
- Toyota Century SUV
- Toyota Crown Sedan
- Toyota Crown Sport
- Toyota EPU concept
- Toyota FT-3e concept
- Toyota FT-Se concept
- Toyota Global Hiace Bev Concept
- Toyota IMV 0 concept
- Toyota JUU
- Toyota Kayoibako concept
- Toyota Land Cruiser 70
- Toyota Land Cruiser 250
- Toyota Land Cruiser Se Concept
- Toyota Land Hopper
- Toyota NEO Steer
- Toyota Rangga Concept
- Toyota Space mobility
- Toyota Vellfire Spacious Lounge Concept
- Toyota X-VAN Gear concept
- Yamaha Tricera Concept
- Yangwang U8

==== 2024 ====
In 2024, the Japan Mobility Show (JMS) Bizweek will continue its evolution, emphasizing business co-creation and cross-industry collaboration. Building on the success of previous editions, JMS 2024 will not focus solely on automobiles but will integrate various sectors, including technology and digital innovation. Scheduled to take place from October 15 to 18 at Makuhari Messe, JMS 2024 will highlight partnerships between automotive manufacturers, startups, and technology companies, particularly through joint exhibits with CEATEC, Japan’s largest digital innovation exhibition. This year's event will also feature expanded opportunities for business matching, startup pitch contests, and reverse pitching sessions, making it a key platform for future mobility solutions and collaboration across industries.

==== 2025 ====
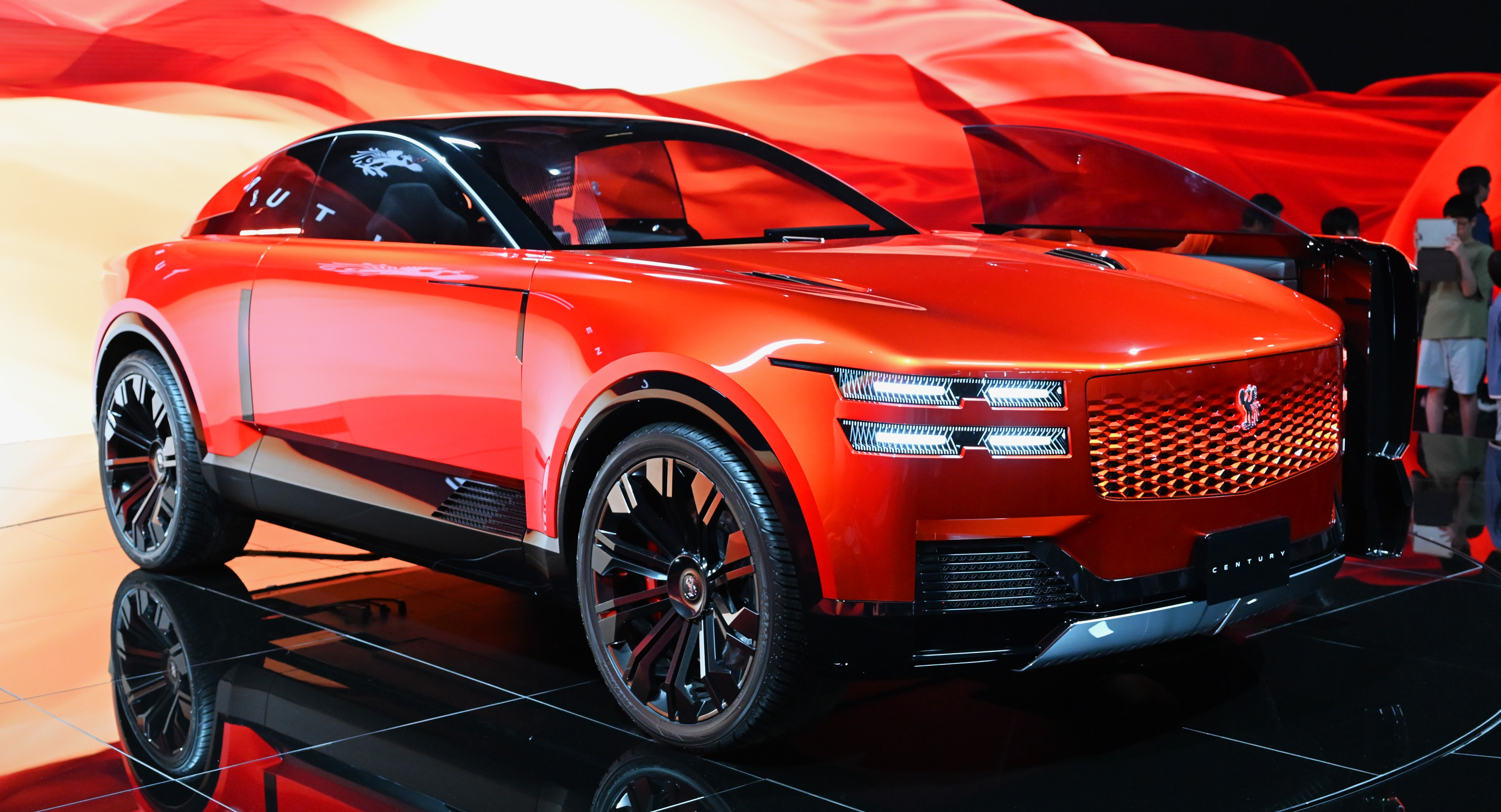
Century Coupe Concept - Japan Mobility Show 2025

The 2025 Japan Mobility Show was held from October 30 through November 9, 2025.

- Acura RSX prototype
- BMW iX3 (NA5)
- BMW Concept Speedtop
- BYD Atto 3 (facelift)
- BYD J6
- BYD Racco
- BYD Sealion 6 DM-i
- BYD T35
- Century Coupe Concept
- Daihatsu K-Open Concept
- Daihatsu K-Vision Concept
- Daihatsu Kayoibako-K Concept
- Daihatsu Midget X Concept
- Honda 0 Saloon Concept
- Honda 0 SUV Concept
- Honda Super-One prototype
- Honda CR-V e:HEV
- Honda 0 α Concept
- Hyundai Nexo (redesign)
- Kia PV5
- Lexus LS Concept
- Lexus LS Coupe Concept
- Lexus LS Micro Concept
- Lexus Catamaran Concept
- Lexus Sport Concept
- Mazda CX-5 (redesign)
- Mazda Vision X-Coupe Concept
- Mazda Vision X-Compact Concept
- Mercedes-Benz Vision V
- Mercedes-AMG Concept GT XX
- Mercedes-Benz GLC with EQ technology
- Mitsubishi Delica D:5 (facelift)
- Mitsubishi Elevance Concept
- Nissan Ariya (facelift)
- Nissan Leaf (redesign)
- Nissan Elgrand (redesign)
- Nissan Micra EV
- Nissan N7
- Nissan Patrol
- Sharp LDK+
- Subaru Performance-B STI
- Subaru Performance-E STI
- Subaru Trailseeker prototype
- Subaru Forester Wilderness prototype
- Subaru Outback Wilderness prototype
- Suzuki Vision e-Sky
- Suzuki e Vitara
- Suzuki Fronx FFV
- Suzuki Victoris
- Toyota Corolla Concept
- Toyota Coms-X
- Toyota Kids Mobi
- Toyota Kago-Bo
- Toyota Hiace Concept
- Toyota IMV Origin
- Toyota Kayoibako
- Toyota Land Cruiser FJ
- Yangwang U9
