= Nissan Nails =

Concept car developed by Nissan

Overview
- Manufacturer: Nissan
- Production: 2001

Body and chassis
- Class: Concept car
- Body style: 2-door pickup
- Layout: FF layout

Powertrain
- Engine: 1.5 L QG15DE I4
- Transmission: 4-speed automatic

Dimensions
- Length: 167 in (4,242 mm)

The Nissan Nails is a concept pickup truck built by Nissan. It was introduced in 2001 at the Tokyo Auto Show.

== Specifications ==
The Nails is powered by a front-mounted 1.5 L QG15DE inline-four engine producing around 100 hp (75 kW; 101 PS), paired to a 4-speed automatic transmission, with power sent to the front wheels. It features a 2-door, 2-seater pickup body style with matte blue and black body panels that Nissan claims are manufactured to be dent and scratch resistant. The load bed of the Nails is placed lower than most contemporary pickup trucks, sitting at around the centerline of the rear wheels, allowing for a low, flat load floor, which makes it easier to load in heavy objects. The sides of the bed are two horizontal rails, connected to the wheelwells, instead of a solid bedside. It also features an upwards opening tailgate hinged at the left, and a "soft partition" between the bed and cabin, which could be rolled up to create a larger bed area.

On the interior, the Nails features a multifunction screen in front of the driver and "integrated communications" tools, such as cellular phone integration. It also features a single slatted bench seat, with alternating slats so the passenger seat can be pushed into the driver seat and free up space in the cabin for larger objects.
