= Nissan Round Box =

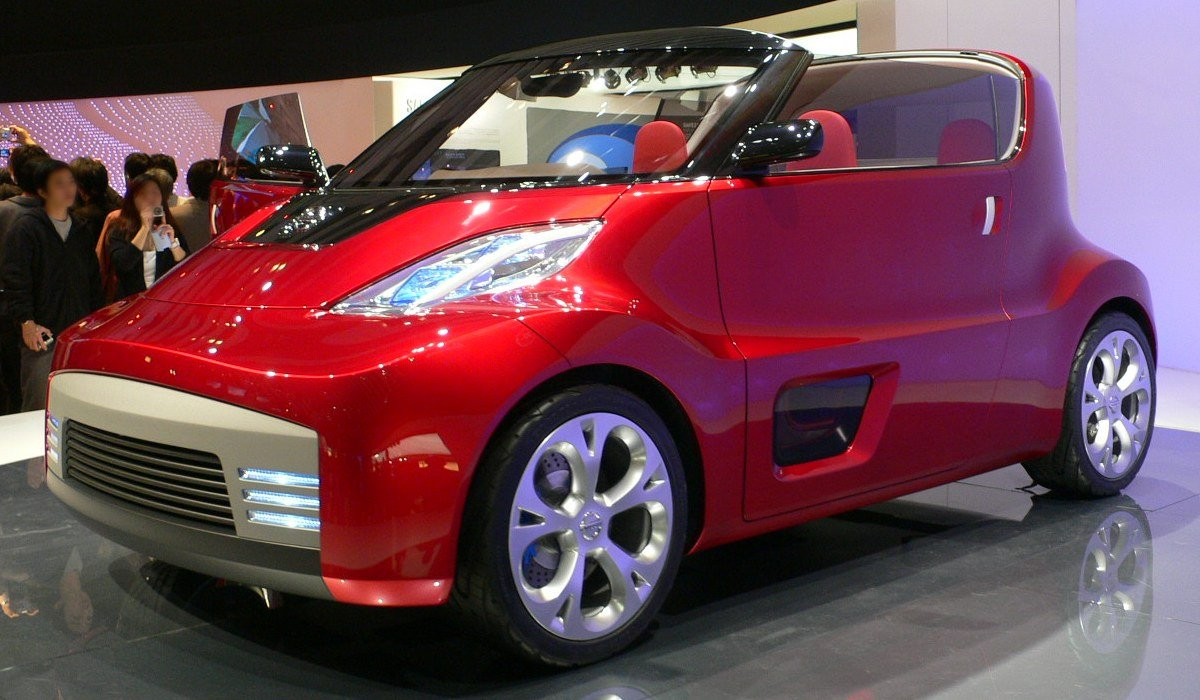
- Front view of the Nissan Round Box

Overview
- Type: Concept car
- Manufacturer: Nissan
- Production: 2007

Body and chassis
- Body style: 3-door convertible

The Nissan Round Box is a concept car developed by the Japanese car manufacturer Nissan. The vehicle was unveiled at the 2007 Tokyo Motor Show. The Round Box is based on the concept of a youth car for carpooling, in which all four passengers would be provided with equal opportunities for entertainment and communication.

== History ==
Nissan engineers were inspired to design the concept car by the atmosphere of sports bars. All visitors to such establishments "are completely relaxed, feel united and share the excitement of watching the game." As stated in the company's press release, the Round Box demonstrates Nissan's vision of shared open-air car travel, in which all passengers and the driver have equal pleasure and can communicate without difficulty. The model's name is essentially an oxymoron. Since the target audience of the concept car is young people, the company also created a second version of this name in SMS language — the RD/BX. This name of the model is associated with one of the features of its interior (a combination of flat and rounded curved surfaces) and with the desire to emphasize that the Round Box has managed to "combine the incompatible".

The Round Box was unveiled along with the Pivo 2, NV200 and Intima concepts at the Tokyo Motor Show, which ran from October 27 to November 11, 2007.

== Design and development ==
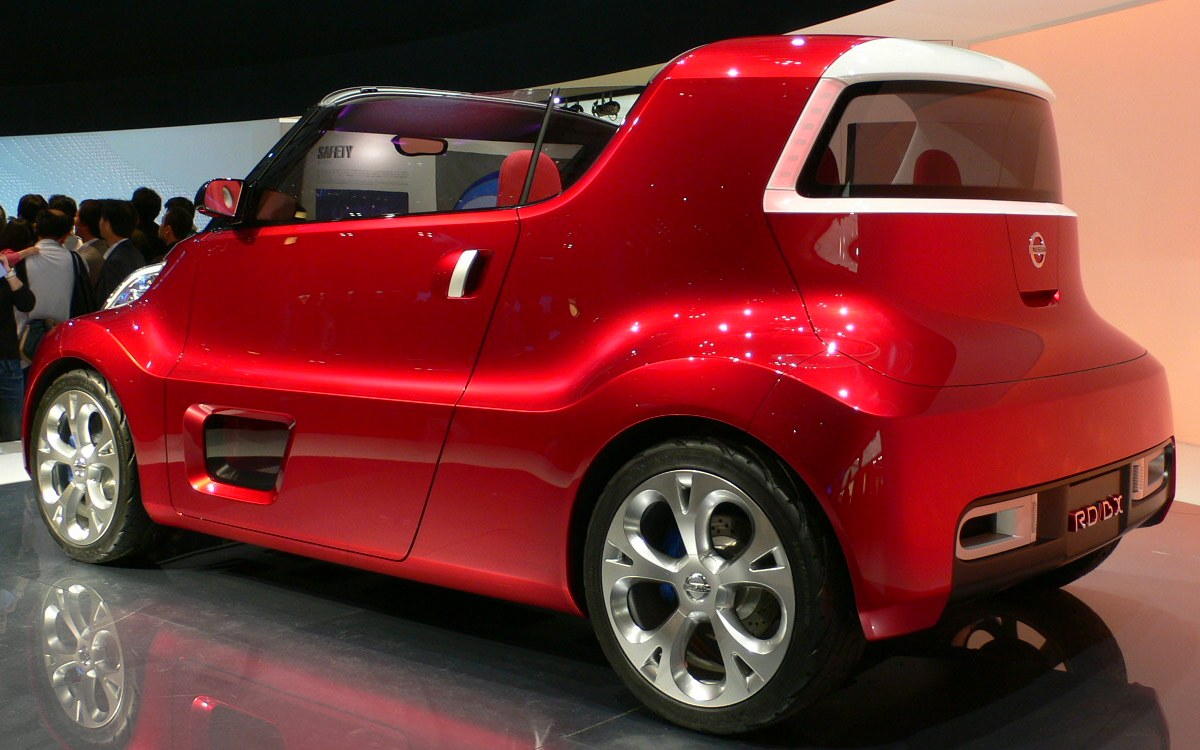
Rear view

The American magazine Wired notes that when developing the concept, Nissan designers relied on the work of their colleagues from the French company Renault, Nissan's partner in the alliance. In terms of dimensions and the general shape of the body, the Round Box resembles the Smart Fortwo. Road & Track called the Round Box "a mixture of Smart and the second-generation Renault Mégane", finding a reference to the latter in the shape of the rear window. The concept's exterior is visually divided into two parts - a wide platform with protruding bumpers, side sills and wheel arches and the remaining part of the body attached to it from above, making up the passenger compartment. This exterior design, according to Nissan, gives the car a sporty appearance.

The front of the Round Box protrudes noticeably from the body. The rear lights are covered at the top with almost opaque white paint, which hides them in the rear pillars of the body. On the rear bumper there is a license plate with the abbreviated model name. The wheels of the car are moved as far as possible to the corners of the body in order to create the most spacious interior, make the car visually wider and give it more stability. The roof can be folded in three parts (a convertible with this roof folding mechanism is called a "targa"), after which it can be stored in the trunk. Data on the volume of the trunk are not disclosed. Another distinctive feature of the exterior is the small windows located at the bottom of the doors, which allow passengers to look at the passing road surface without risking their lives.

According to the company, the cabin in the Round Box is "ideally sized" for four passengers. The seats are divided into two rows, each with a two-seater bench. The lower portion of the benches resembles a classic car seat, while the backrests are separate for each passenger and have a semicircular shape. According to the press release, the former creates a "sense of unity" with other passengers, while the latter facilitates communication between them. According to Kaoru Sato, assistant chief designer of the Product Design Division, this combination of backrests and seats would be impossible in conventional cars, and this seat shape is particularly suitable for young people. The car also features several electronic safety systems, united under the Nissan Safety Shield umbrella: the Around View Monitor and the Distance Control Assist System. The Round Box is equipped with a turbocharged petrol engine with direct fuel injection, combined with a continuously variable transmission, which ensures maximum fuel efficiency and smooth running.

The main distinguishing feature of the interior is the Play Catch system, which allows the driver and all passengers to easily exchange information. This system uses two displays: a large, primary one on the center console, and a second, smaller one on the instrument panel . The company gives the following example in the official press release: passengers use the central display to search for the nearest restaurant or store, while route information to the establishment is displayed on the second screen in front of the driver. At the same time, the driver can easily concentrate on driving thanks to the coordinated operation of the two screens. To control the screen on the center console, the company decided to copy the mechanism from one of the previous concepts – the Urge. As in the Urge, control levers reminiscent of game joysticks are built into the car's door armrests.

== Reception ==
The Round received mixed reviews from automotive magazines and online publications. Editors of Wired magazine deemed the lower door windows to be "both the most interesting and most distracting feature" of the concept. Car and Driver magazine called the concept "a generic roller coaster car with a Hello Kitty-style Batplane steering wheel." The British publication Top Gear, citing the editors' possible age for judging the Round Box, called the concept's appearance "crap." The car's protruding front end was described as "part ugly Peugeot, part snowplow." Car magazine deemed the car "the most insignificant" and "stupid" Nissan concept at the show. The Russian publication Drive gave the car a warmer review, calling it "an excellent development" for young people. The only question raised was the Play Catch system, as the editors found it difficult to understand why a driver would need such a system.
