= Volkswagen EcoRacer =

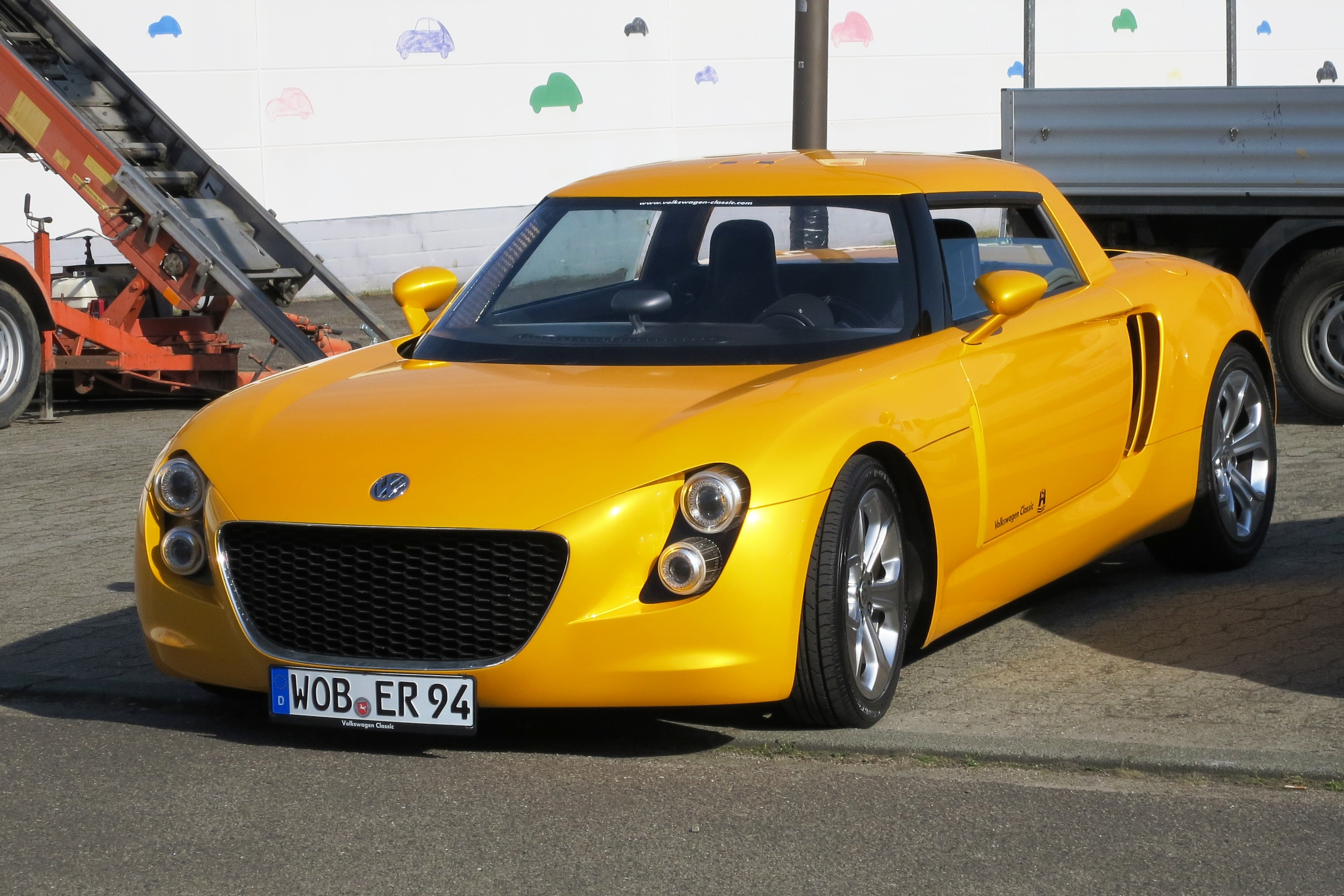
- The Volkswagen EcoRacer at the Volkswagen Museum car park

Overview
- Manufacturer: Volkswagen
- Production: 2005
- Designer: Cesar Muntada

Body and chassis
- Class: Concept car
- Body style: 2-door roadster
- Layout: mid mounted front-engine, rear-wheel drive

Powertrain
- Engine: 1.5 L TDI turbocharged diesel
- Transmission: 7-speed DSG automated manual

Dimensions
- Wheelbase: 2.48 m (98 in)
- Length: 3.765 m (148.2 in)
- Curb weight: 850 kg (1,870 lb)

The Volkswagen EcoRacer is a concept car manufactured by Volkswagen which was first shown to the public at the 2005 Tokyo Motor Show. The car envisioned as an ultra-efficient diesel-powered sports car.

It was designed by Cesar Muntada, a Barcelona born designer, who previously worked in the Design Center of PSA Peugeot and of Honda. Muntada is also the acclaimed author of the successful project "Showdown", a Harley-Davidson based concept bike allotted to be made by 2020.

== Design and features ==
The EcoRacer has a two seats and has a small luggage compartment. It features an ability to convert into three modes: coupe, roadster (no roof) or speedster (no pillar/windscreen). The body is made out of carbon fibre, which resulted in a relatively low weight of 850 kilograms (approximately 1875 lb). It is 3.765 meters (148.2 inches) with a wheelbase of 2.48 meters (98 inches).

== Specifications and performance ==
It has a 1.5 L turbocharged diesel engine. Despite the small displacement, it delivers one hundred kilowatts (136 hp) with 250 N·m of torque at 1900 rpm. The engine is of the common rail type, which is more efficient and quieter than the conventional rotary pump injection systems. It is equipped with a particulate matter filter. The engine is linked to a Direct-Shift Gearbox (DSG) with seven gears, and is a mid mount in front of the rear axle.

The EcoRacer accelerates from 0–100 km/h (0–62 mph) in 6.3 seconds and reaching a top speed of 230 km/h (140 mph). The average fuel consumption is 3.4 liters per 100 km (70 miles per gallon).
