= Nissan Foria =

Nissan concept vehicle

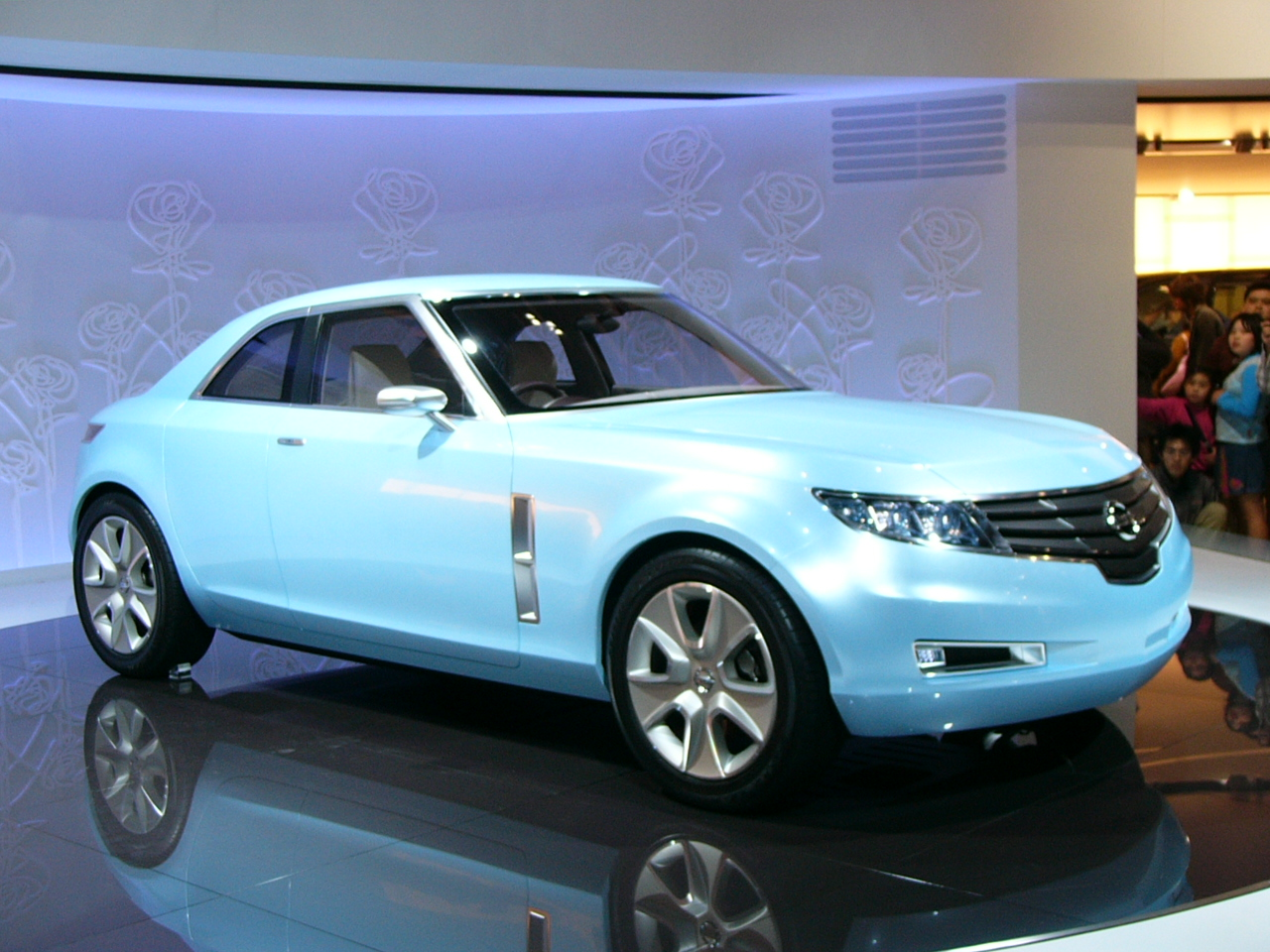
- 2005 Nissan Foria at the Tokyo Motor Show (front)

Overview
- Manufacturer: Nissan
- Production: 2005
- Designer: Richard Winsor

Body and chassis
- Class: Compact car (C)
- Body style: 4-door quad coupe
- Layout: Front-engine, rear-wheel drive (FR)

Powertrain
- Transmission: Semi-automatic

Dimensions
- Wheelbase: ~2,700 mm (110 in)
- Length: ~4,350 mm (171 in)
- Width: ~1,695 mm (66.7 in)
- Height: ~1,370 mm (54 in)

Chronology
- Predecessor: Nissan Silvia (spiritual)

The Nissan Foria is a compact 2+2-door quad coupe concept car revealed by Japanese automobile manufacturer Nissan at the 2005 Tokyo Motor Show inspired by the 1965 Nissan Silvia.

== Overview ==
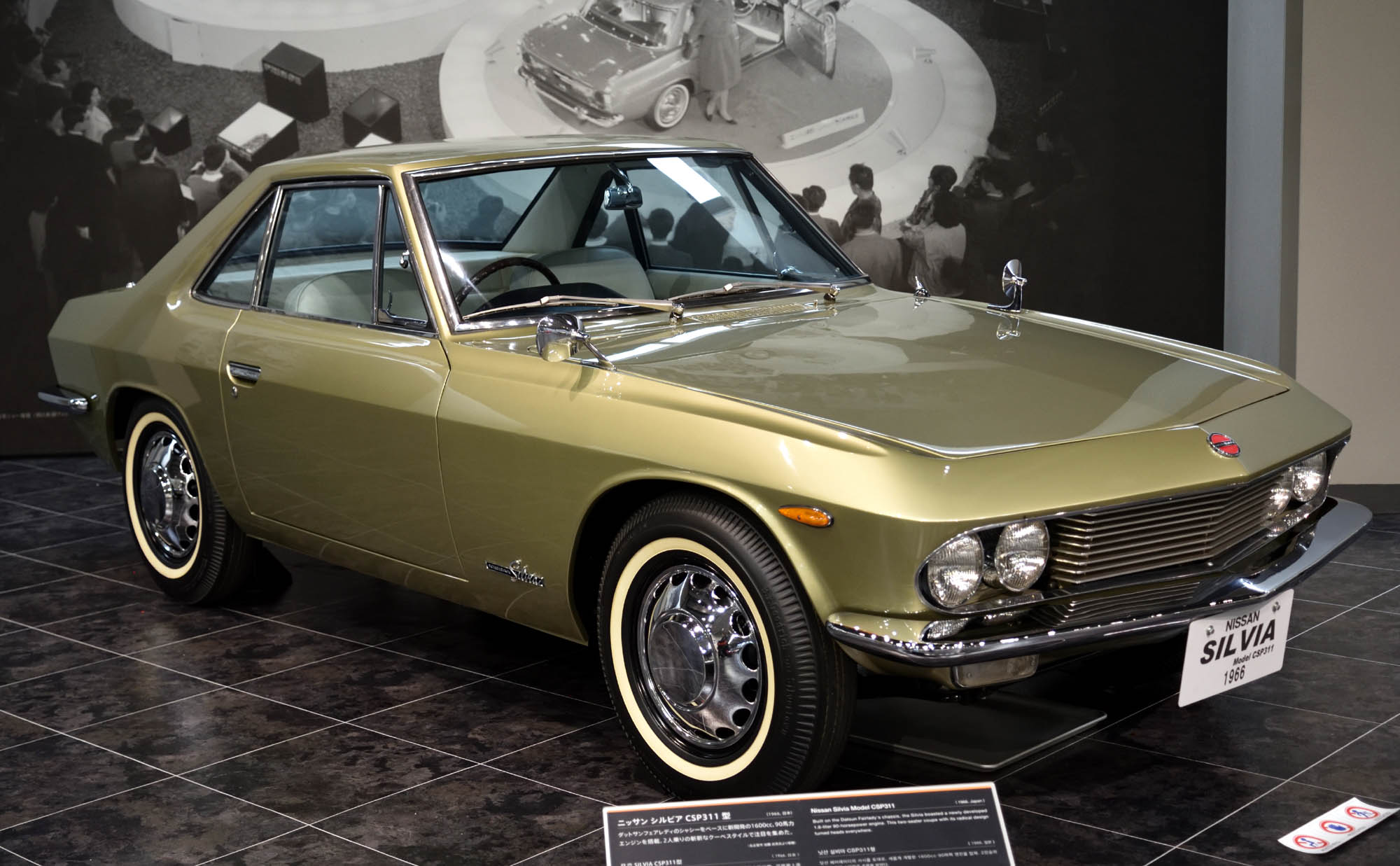
The 1965 Nissan Silvia CSP311, which the Foria's design is based on

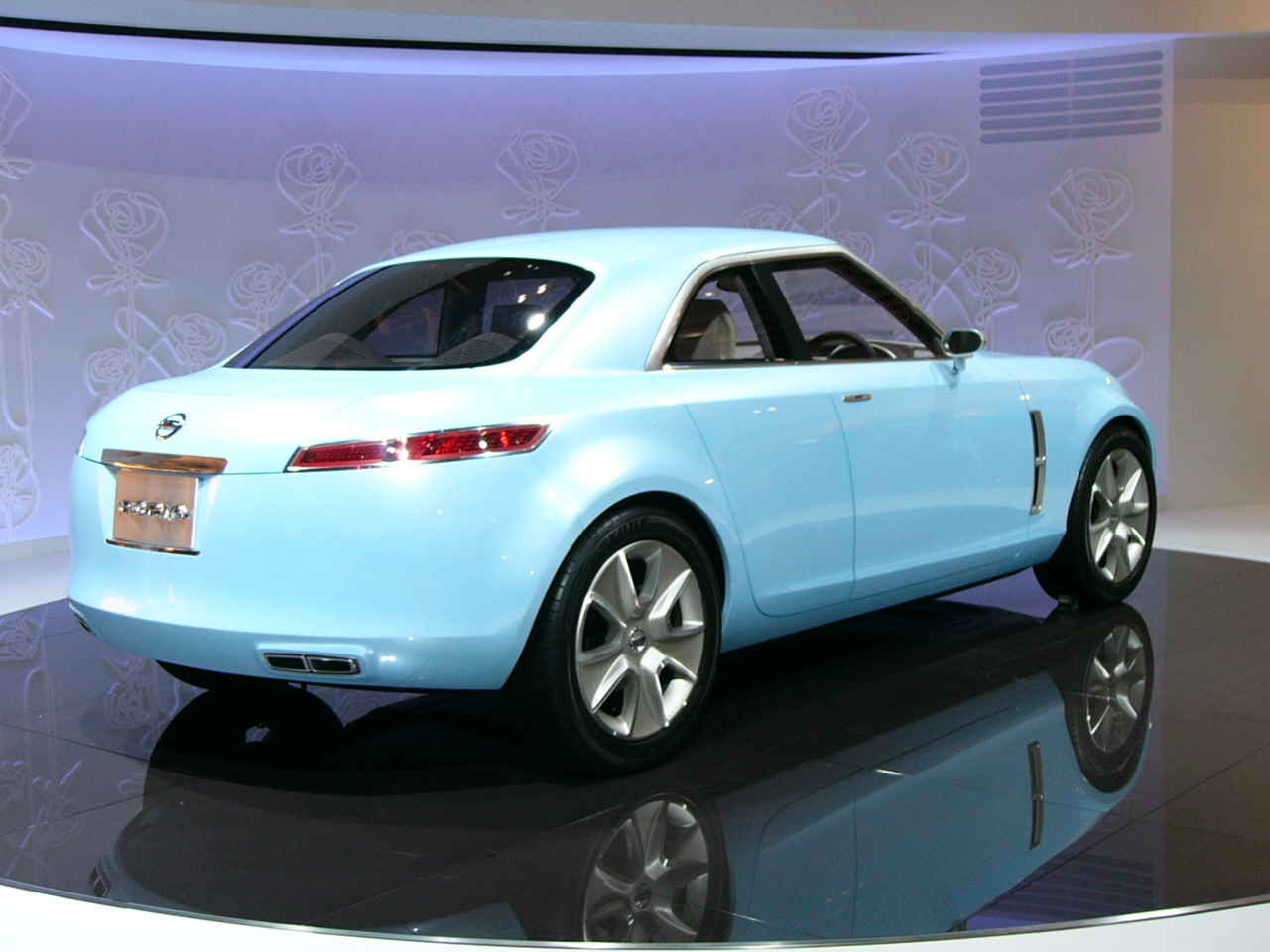
2005 Nissan Foria at the Tokyo Motor Show (rear)

The retro-styled Nissan Foria concept was revealed in October 2005 at the Tokyo Motor Show, alongside the Amenio minivan, GT-R Proto, Note Adidas, and Pivo microcar concepts, a coupe with two hidden doors in the rear for easier rear seat access. The overall design of the Foria is inspired by the 1965 Nissan Silvia CSP311 coupe and was designed by Richard Winsor, a senior designer at Nissan.

In August 2008, a new compact rear-wheel drive successor to the Nissan Silvia inspired by the Foria concept was planned. However, development of this car was later suspended in February 2009 as part of Carlos Ghosn's pledge to reduce costs and the Foria resultingly remained as an unproduced concept.

== Specifications ==
The Nissan Foria has a front-engine, rear-wheel drive layout, and uses a paddle shift semi-automatic transmission. The concept also features Nissan's four-wheel Active Steer and 18-inch wheels. The interior of the car is finished with gray fabric and a mix of brown and ivory leather and the exterior is painted in a light blue.
