= BRX =

BRX may refer to:

- Cadillac BRX, a concept car
- BRX, the IATA code for María Montez International Airport
- brx, the ISO 639-3 code of the Boro language of India
- Bahrain Raid Xtreme, motorsports rally team
- Brixton railway station, London, National Rail station code
- BRX, abbreviation for BREVIS RADIX, a plant-specific gene and protein
- BRX, abbreviation for the British political party The Brexit Party, now Reform UK
