= Opel Flextreme =

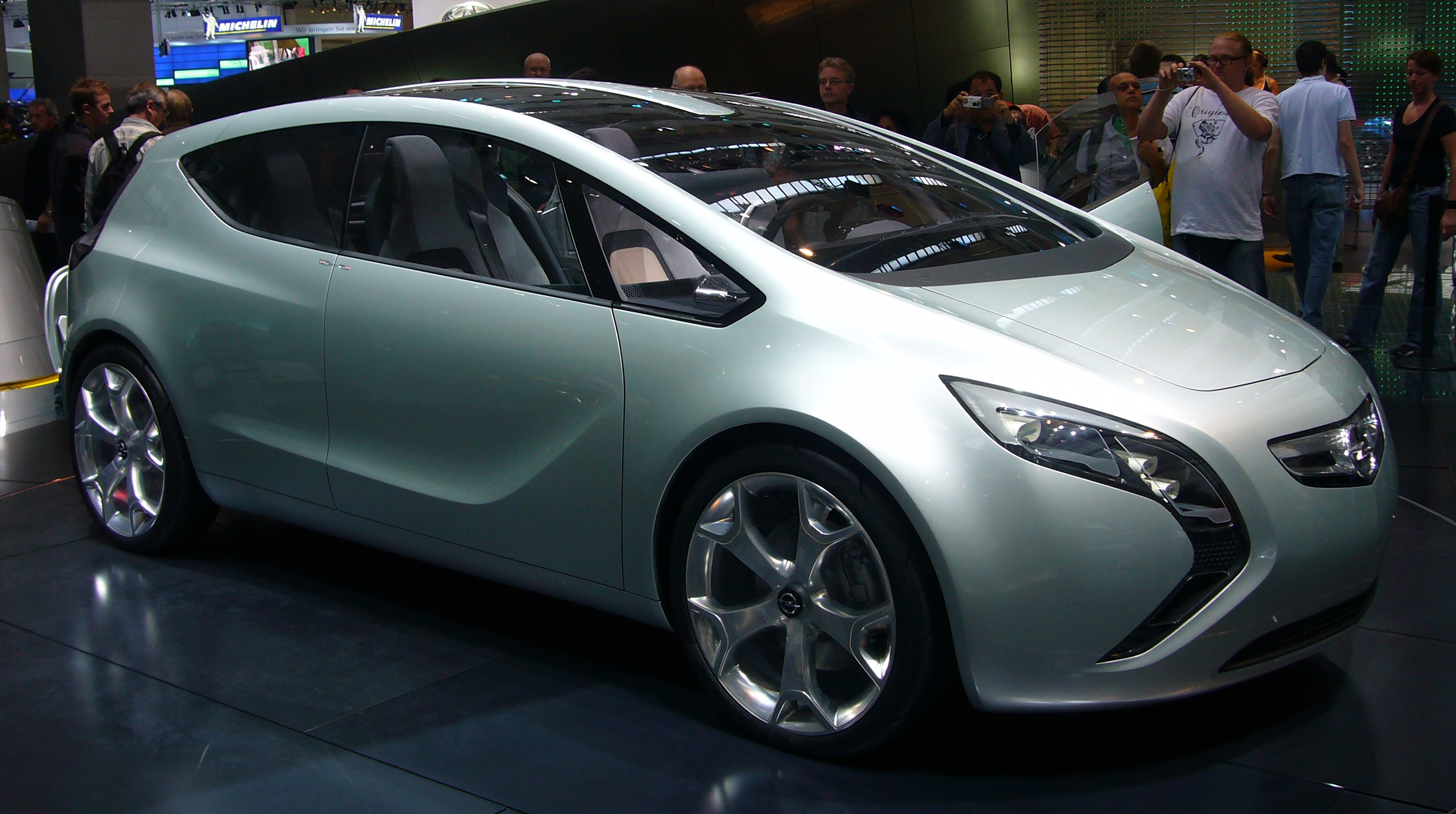

Overview
- Manufacturer: Opel
- Also called: Saturn Flextreme (North America)
- Production: 2008 (Concept car)

Body and chassis
- Class: Small family car (C)
- Body style: 5-door hatchback
- Layout: FF layout
- Platform: Delta II/E-Flex
- Related: Chevrolet Volt; Opel Ampera

Powertrain
- Engine: 1.3L diesel engine and electric motor
- Transmission: direct
- Range: 34 miles (55 km)

Dimensions
- Wheelbase: 2,725 mm (107.3 in)
- Length: 4,555 mm (179.3 in)
- Width: 1,836 mm (72.3 in)
- Height: 1,487 mm (58.5 in)

Chronology
- Successor: Chevrolet Volt (North America); Opel Ampera (Europe)

The Opel Flextreme is a diesel plug-in hybrid concept small family hatchback created by Opel in 2008. The Opel Flextreme shares the same GM E-Flex platform as the Chevrolet Volt (front engine, four door).

== Overview ==
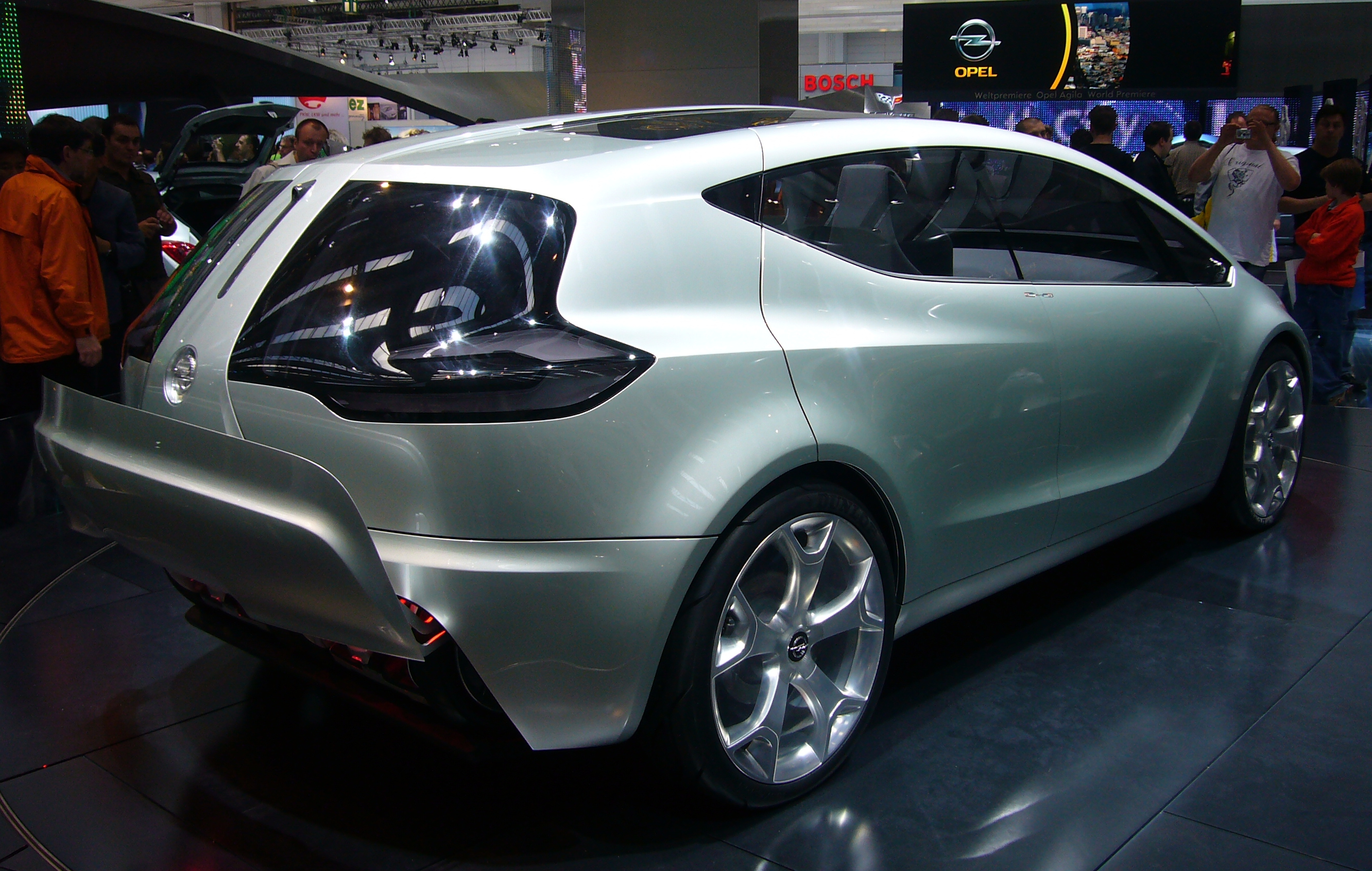
Rear view

It is based on the same GM E-Flex series hybrid platform used in the Chevrolet Volt, but using a diesel rather than petrol engine. It can travel 55 kilometres (34 mi) on its lithium-ion battery before a small diesel engine starts charging the battery.

The Opel Flextreme is a small family car with a 5-door hatchback body styling with 5 seats.

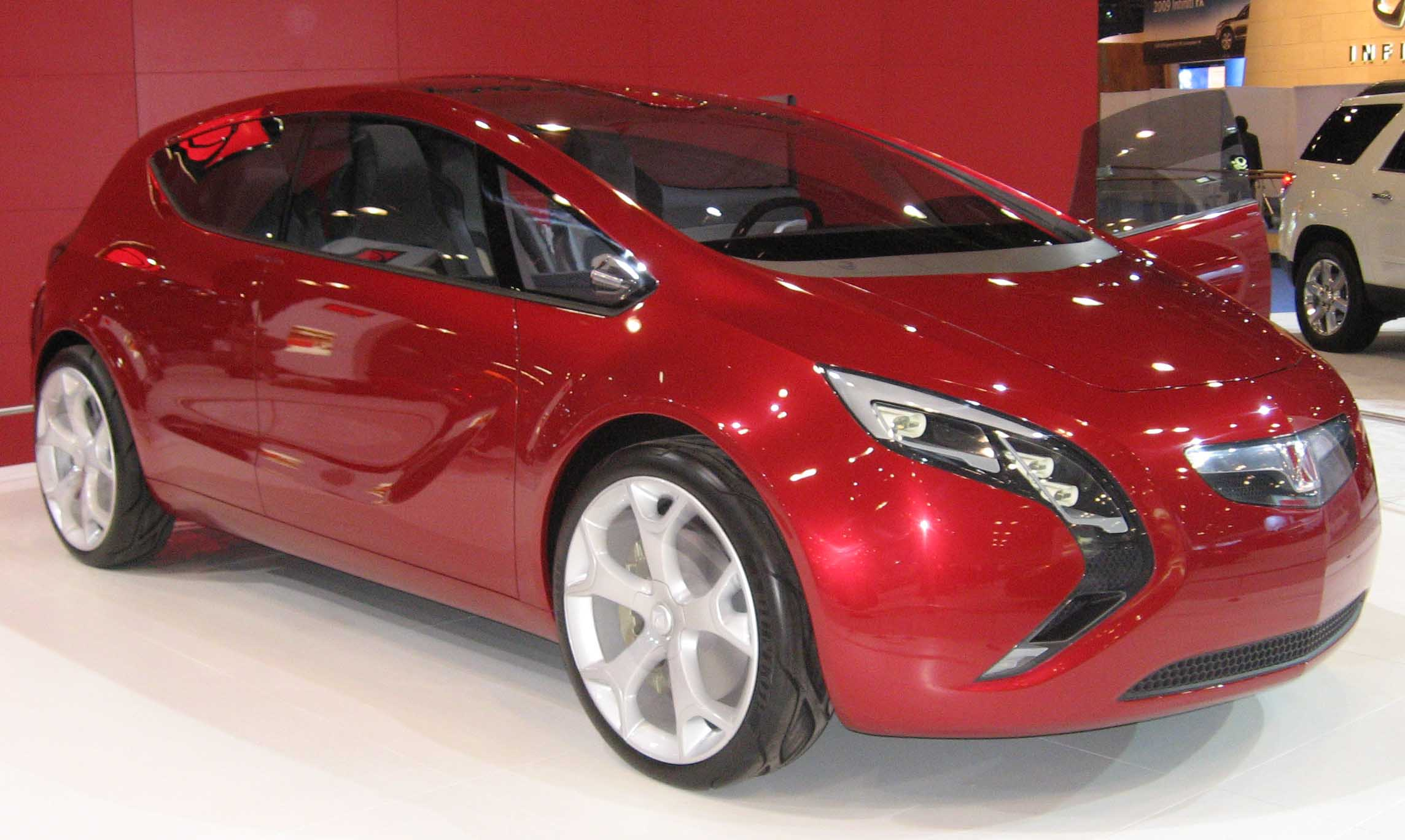
Saturn Flextreme

In January 2008, a rebadged version of the concept was introduced at the North American International Auto Show as the Saturn Flextreme. The Opel Flextreme was expected to emit 40 grams of CO_{2} per km or less (according to European test procedure ECE R101 for range extender vehicles). It was expected to reach approximately 153 mpg_{‑US} (1.54 L/100 km; 184 mpg_{‑imp}).
