= GM Voltec powertrain =

GM Voltec platform

Overview
- Manufacturer: General Motors
- Also called: E-Flex
- Production: 2010–2019

Body and chassis
- Class: Extended-Range EV (EREV)
- Vehicles: Chevrolet Volt, Cadillac ELR, Holden Volt, Opel Ampera, Vauxhall Ampera

Voltec, formerly known as E-Flex, is a General Motors powertrain released in November 2010. The Voltec architecture is primarily a plug-in capable, battery-dominant electric vehicle with additional fossil fuel powered series and parallel hybrid capabilities.

Voltec vehicles like the Chevrolet Volt are all electrically driven, feature common drivetrain components, and will be able to create electricity on board using either a fuel cell or a gasoline motor to generate electricity. Regenerative braking contributes to the on-board electricity generation.

Voltec is a portmanteau word from Volt, Vortec and technology.

== Drivetrain ==
=== Generation 1 ===
==== E-Flex concept (2007) ====
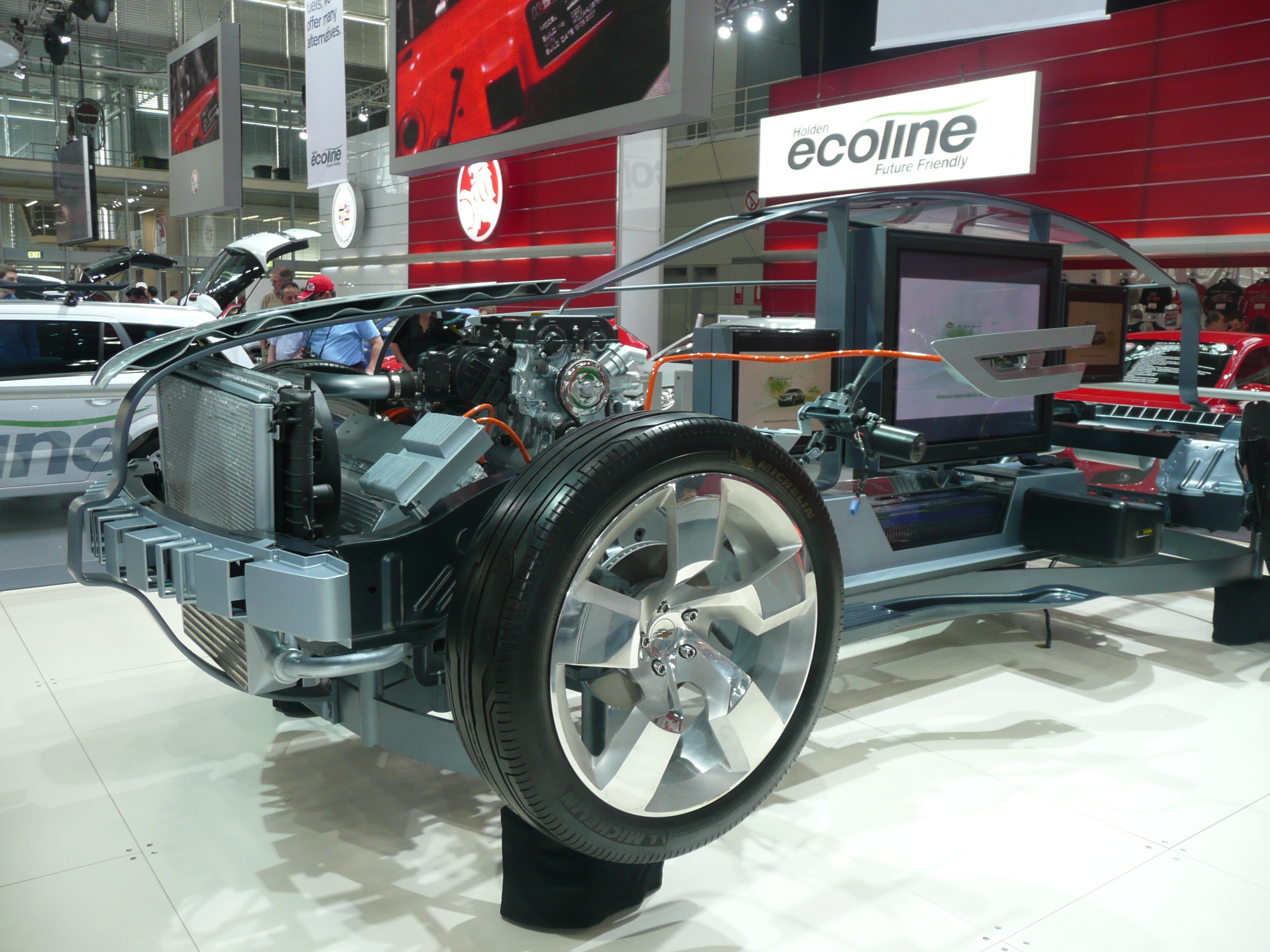
E-Flex Propulsion System (Chevrolet Volt concept)

The Voltec drivetrain was initially demonstrated as the E-Flex Propulsion System in the 2007 Chevrolet Volt concept vehicle that debuted at that year's North American International Auto Show. GM touted E-Flex as an attempt to standardize many components of possible future electrically propelled vehicles, and to allow multiple interchangeable electricity-generating systems. GM described the Volt an E-REV, for "extended-range electric vehicle", rather than a hybrid. In general, power is drawn from the batteries for the electric traction motor which moves the vehicle.

As realized in the 2007 Volt concept, the initial E-Flex design includes an electric traction motor with peak power and torque outputs of 120 kW (160 hp) and 320 N⋅m (240 lbf⋅ft), a 1 L 3-cylinder gasoline engine coupled to a generator with an output of 53 kW (71 hp), and a 16 kWh (58 MJ) lithium-ion battery energy storage system. The concept has a fuel tank with 12 US gal (45 L; 10.0 imp gal) capacity, yielding a claimed combined electric and gasoline driving range of 640 mi (1,030 km) and an overall fuel economy of 50 mpg_{‑US} (4.7 L/100 km; 60 mpg_{‑imp}). Using a conventional household outlet (110 V AC, 15 A), the battery could be recharged in 6 1/2 hours.

The E-Flex could be considered a power-split hybrid, as the platform shares aspects of both series hybrid and parallel hybrid designs. Like a series hybrid, the internal combustion engine is not connected to the transmission, so it can run at a constant speed for both optimal efficiency and mechanical simplicity (i.e., there is no need for variable cam phasing). Starting from rest, E-Flex uses the electric traction motor alone to drive the wheels; mechanical power from the engine is used strictly to drive the generator, which in turn charges the battery pack. At high demand in charge sustaining mode, the motor output stays high to build up a charge.

However, by definition, the E-Flex transmission design makes it a parallel hybrid, as the planetary gearset which drives the wheels is coupled to both mechanical power (from the engine) and electrical power (from the motor), similar to the operation of a Toyota Prius. The Prius uses the electric motor to assist the engine; in contrast, the Voltec design uses the engine to assist the electric traction motor. As a result, the Voltec design engages mechanical assist from the engine only when the battery is depleted to 30% state of charge or lower.

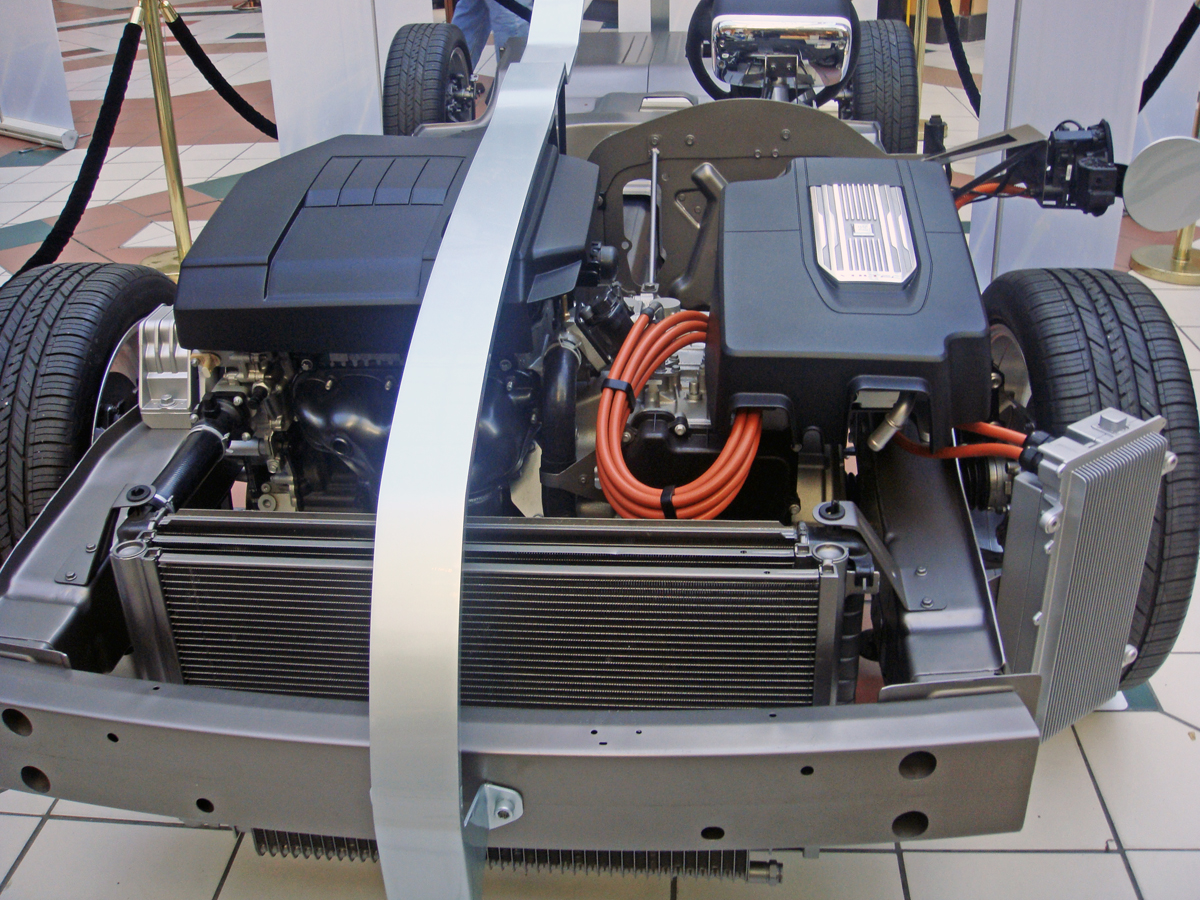
In this production Voltec (gen 1) powertrain, the internal combustion engine / range extender is on the left and the Voltec drive unit is on the right. The coiled bundle of orange high-voltage cables between the engine and drive unit connect the traction power inverter module (TPIM, on top) to the transaxle below (not visible).

Since the electric traction motor draws power from the battery, the platform supports multiple options for charging the battery. As described at the 2007 NAIAS, the initial configuration used a turbocharged 1.0-liter engine with three cylinders; this was a flex-fuel engine capable of running gasoline or E85 (85% ethanol, 15% gasoline), although this engine never made it to production vehicles. Alternative engine-generator options mentioned included a pure ethanol (E100) engine, a diesel engine capable of running biodiesel fuel, or even a hydrogen fuel cell, once that technology becomes practical. Another power-source option which does not rely on an internal combustion engine at all, was demonstrated in the Volt hydrogen fuel cell concept vehicle, which appeared at the 2007 Shanghai Auto Show. However, due to the high cost of fuel cells compared to newer lower cost lithium batteries, General Motors has publicly suggested that the Volt will not be using fuel cells in any near term production vehicles.

==== Production ====
The first generation production Volt is propelled by an electric motor with a peak output of 111 kW (149 hp). Ordinarily, the Volt charged while at home overnight (plug-in hybrid-mode) through a charging port. A full charge reportedly takes 10-12 hours from a standard North American 120 V, 15 A household outlet, or 4 hours from a 240 V 15 A SAE J1772 electrical vehicle supply.

The lithium-ion battery in the initial Voltec production vehicle is kept in a state-of-charge (SOC) range of between 30% and 80%, with the on-board generator that works to maintain the battery at the 30% charge level. As initially released, the high-voltage storage battery had a gross capacity of 16 kW-hr; it was upgraded to 16.5 and then 17.1 kW-hr in 2014.

The GM codes for the first-generation Voltec powertrain drive unit (transaxle) are 4ET50 (RPO MKA for the Chevrolet Volt) and 4ET55 (RPO MKD for the Cadillac ELR). This transaxle integrates a torque dampener (serving the same purpose as a torque converter in a conventional automatic transmission), motor/generator A, the planetary gearset, three clutches, drive motor B, and a final drive including a reduction gear and differential.

Voltec (Generation 1) variations
Specification Vehicle	Gasoline engine	Electric			Combined output	Consumption / Economy		
Specification Vehicle	Gasoline engine	M/G A	M/G B	Battery	Combined output	EV	Hybrid (City/Hwy)	Electric range
Chevrolet Volt	1.4 L LUU I4; 84 hp (63 kW); 93 lb⋅ft (126 N⋅m)	74 hp (55 kW); 137 lbf⋅ft (186 N⋅m)	149 hp (111 kW); 273 lb⋅ft (370 N⋅m)	9 kW-hr; 16 kW-hr (gross)	149 hp (111 kW); 273 lb⋅ft (370 N⋅m)	98 mpg‑e (21 kWh/100 km)	35 / 40 mpg_{‑US} (6.7 / 5.9 l/100 km)	38 mi (61 km)
Cadillac ELR	1.4 L L2Z I4; 86 hp (64 kW); 94 lb⋅ft (127 N⋅m)	74 hp (55 kW); 137 lbf⋅ft (186 N⋅m)	157 hp (117 kW), EV mode 181 hp (135 kW), hybrid 295 lb⋅ft (400 N⋅m)	16.5 kW-hr	217 hp (162 kW); 295 lb⋅ft (400 N⋅m)	82 mpg‑e (26 kWh/100 km)	31 / 35 mpg_{‑US} (7.6 / 6.7 l/100 km)	37 mi (60 km)

==== Operation ====
As described in the patent, the engine is coupled to the transaxle using a torque dampener, which is a selectively engaged clutch that couples the engine with the rotor of Motor/Generator A. In addition to the selective coupling with the engine, Motor/Generator A also may be coupled to the ring gear of a planetary gearset using a second clutch. A third clutch is provided to selectively ground the ring gear. Motor B is permanently coupled to the sun gear of the same gearset; the pinion carrier drives the wheels through a reduction gear and differential. Using this design, the transaxle is able to switch between series hybrid and split output modes, with low ranges provided as a series hybrid using one motor and high ranges provided by split output which blends output from both motors.

There are six basic operating modes, depending on clutch engagement and engine operation; General Motors have classified the modes according to power flow to or from the battery. These include two charge-depletion (all-electric) modes, CD1 and CD2, and two charge-sustaining (extended-range / hybrid) modes, CS1 and CS2. In brief:

- CD1: Motor B is used for tractive power
- CD2: Motor B is used for tractive power, assisted by Motor/Generator A as a motor
- CS1: Motor B is used for tractive power, and the engine is used to generate electricity using M/G A as a generator (series hybrid)
- CS2: Motor B is used for tractive power, assisted by the engine (output power-split)

The patent includes two additional neutral modes where little to no tractive power is being applied.

Voltec (Generation 1) operating modes, from U.S. Patent 7,867,124 B2
Mode	Name	Diagram	Clutches			(E)ngine	M/G		Description
Mode	Name	Diagram	C1	C2	C3	(E)ngine	A	B	Description
CD1 (1)	One motor, electric-only		Yes	No	No	No	off	M	Engaging clutch 1 (C1) grounds the ring gear (R). Motor B is used as the traction motor, driving the sun gear (S); since the ring gear is grounded, the pinion gears (P) are forced to turn, driving the wheels through a reducing gear and differential.
CD2 (6)	Two motor, electric-only		No	Yes	No	No	M	M	Engaging clutch 2 (C2) couples Motor/Generator A to the ring gear (R), assisting Motor B, which is used as the primary traction motor, driving the sun gear (S); the wheels are driven by the pinion gears (P) through a reducing gear and differential.
CS1 (2)	Series hybrid		Yes	No	Yes	Yes	G	M	Engaging clutch 1 (C1) grounds the ring gear (R), and clutch 3 (C3) couples the engine (E) to Motor/Generator A, which operates as a (G)enerator to charge the storage battery. Motor B is used as the sole traction motor, driving the sun gear (S); since the ring gear is grounded, the pinion gears (P) are forced to turn, driving the wheels through a reducing gear and differential.
CS2 (3)	Output power-split		No	Yes	Yes	Yes	off	M	Engaging clutch 2 (C2) and clutch 3 (C3) couples the engine (E) to Motor/Generator A and the ring gear (R). In this mode, the engine is used to assist Motor B, which has primary traction duties, driving the wheels via the coupled sun (S) and pinion gears (P), a reducing gear and differential.
(4)	Neutral		No	No	No	on or off	off	off	No clutches are engaged, and both Motor/Generator A and Motor B are allowed to freewheel.
(5)	Neutral / battery charge		No	No	Yes	Yes	G	off	Engaging clutch 3 (C3) couples the engine (E) to Motor/Generator A, which operates as a (G)enerator to charge the storage battery. Motor B freewheels.

From the patent, the engine provides tractive power only when both clutches C2 and C3 are engaged. For the first-generation Volt and ELR, that occurs in one operating mode (CS2), and in that mode, the engine is considered to assist the electric traction motor (B).

=== Generation 2 ===
The refreshed 2016 Volt featured a 1.5L I4 engine generator that runs on regular, rather than premium gasoline, and an upgraded battery pack with greater capacity of 18.4 kW-hr, giving an estimated 52 mi (84 km) of all-electric range per charge, compared to 41 mi (66 km) with the first generation Volt.

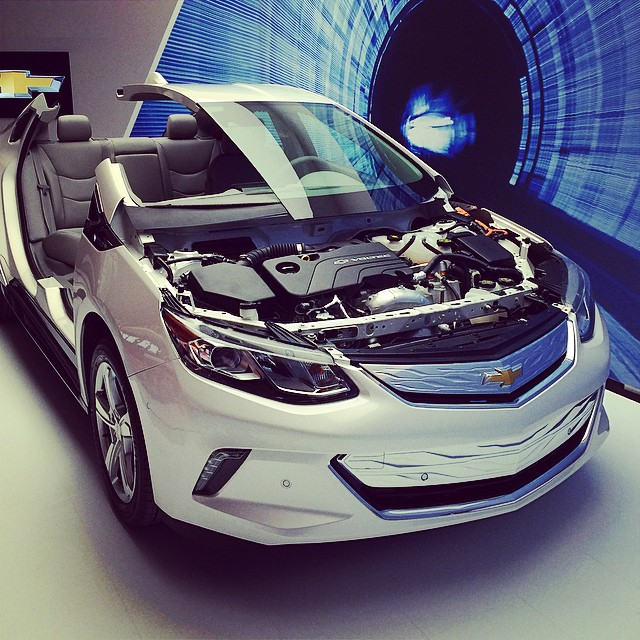
Cutaway of second-generation Volt; engine is still on left and drive unit is on right (driver's side).

The GM code for the second-generation Voltec powertrain drive unit (transaxle) is 5ET50. Compared to the first-generation 4ET50/55 transaxles, the overall design has shifted closer to being a parallel hybrid, running more often using mechanical power from the engine supplemented by the electric motors in hybrid mode. A second planetary gear set has been added and the planetary gears are interconnected by coupling the two pinion carriers together, which are coupled in turn to the transaxle output to the final drive differential and wheels. In addition, both electric motors now are used as motors and generators; motor/generator A uses ferrite magnets and has an output of 48 kW (64 hp) / 118 N⋅m (87 lbf⋅ft), while motor/generator B uses rare earth magnets and has an output of 87 kW (117 hp) / 280 N⋅m (210 lbf⋅ft). Each motor is smaller than the corresponding motor in the first-generation Voltec, reducing the weight of the transaxle from 164 to 119 kg (362 to 262 lb).

==== Operating modes ====
The second generation Volt has five different operating modes, two charge-depletion (all-electric), CD1 and CD2, and three charge-sustaining (hybrid), CS1 to CS3. These are:

- CD1: Motor/Generator B is used for tractive power
- CD2: Both Motor/Generators A and B are used for tractive power
- CS1: The engine is used for tractive power, assisted by M/G B, with an electrically-variable gear ratio ("low-range" for high power or low speeds)
- CS2: The engine is used for tractive power, assisted by M/G B, with a fixed gear ratio (typical driving conditions requiring acceleration)
- CS3: The engine is used for tractive power with an electrically-variable gear ratio ("high-range" or "overdrive" for highway cruising)

Voltec (Generation 2) operating modes, from U.S. Patent 8,602,938 B1
Mode	Name	Diagram	Clutches			(E)ngine	M/G		Description
Mode	Name	Diagram	C1	C2	C3	(E)ngine	A	B	Description
CD1	Single motor (B), electric-only		Yes	No	No	No	off	M	Engaging clutch 1 (C1) grounds the first ring gear (R1). Motor B is used as the traction motor.
CD2	Dual motor, electric-only		Yes	No	Yes	No	M	M	Engaging clutch 1 (C1) and clutch 3 (C3) grounds both ring gears (R1 and R2). Motor B is used as the primary traction motor, with assistance from Motor A.
[CD3]	Single motor (A), electric-only		No	No	Yes	No	M	off	Included for completeness as described in the patent, but this mode was not implemented. Engaging clutch 3 (C3) grounds the second ring gear (R2). Motor A is used as the traction motor.
CS1	First (low-range) electrically variable extended-range hybrid		Yes	No	No	Yes	G	M	Engaging clutch 1 (C1) grounds the first ring gear (R1). The engine is used for traction, assisted by motor B; A is used as a generator.
CS2	Fixed ratio hybrid		Yes	Yes	No	Yes	off	M	Engaging clutch 2 (C2) couples motor/generator A to the first ring gear (R1) and engaging clutch 1 (C1) grounds the first ring gear (R1), meaning M/G A does not turn. The engine is used for traction, assisted by motor B.
CS3	Second (high-range) electrically variable extended-range hybrid		No	Yes	No	Yes	M	G	Engaging clutch 2 (C2) couples motor/generator A to the first ring gear (R1). The engine is used for traction, and B is used as a generator, with A running at variable speeds to proportion engine output between the wheels and generator B.

The clutch (C3) on the ring gear of the second planetary gearset (R2) is a one-way clutch, which prevents motor/generator A from turning the engine backward.

==== Malibu ====
Stick diagram of 5ET50 (MKE) transmission used with Chevrolet Malibu Hybrid

The Chevrolet Malibu Hybrid uses the same basic two-motor Voltec drive unit/transaxle design and general layout as the second-generation Volt; however, compared to the Volt, the Malibu Hybrid is not a plug-in hybrid and has a smaller battery. Consequently, the Malibu Hybrid operates in the charge-sustaining (CSx) modes more often, and is fitted with different rotors for its motor/generator units, sharing the same stators as the Volt. The Volt uses ferrite magnets for the rotor in M/G A and rare-earth magnets for the rotor in M/G B, while the Malibu Hybrid has rare-earth magnets for the rotors in both M/G A and B.

The Malibu Hybrid offers the same three charge sustaining (CS1–CS3) operating modes as the Volt but only one charge draining mode (CD1). The Malibu Hybrid transaxle is designated 5ET50 (MKE), which is similar to the 5ET50 (MKV) used in the Volt, but omits the one-way sprag clutch on the first planetary gearset (labeled as "C3" in the Volt mode diagrams), which makes it impossible to run in two-motor mode (CD2).

==== CT6 ====
Stick diagram of 4EL70 transmission used with CT6 PHEV

The Cadillac CT6 PHEV has a front-engine, rear-wheel drive layout which uses a longitudinally-mounted engine and the 4EL70 transmission (RPO MRD) with a driveshaft extending to the rear wheels. The transmission is schematically similar to the 5ET50 transaxle, with an additional planetary gearset and two more clutches, primarily for performance; the output of the two coupled pinion gear carriers (P1 and P2) is coupled to the sun gear of the third planetary gearset (S3), and the pinion gear carrier of the third planetary gearset (P3) provides output to the driveshaft. Because the transmission retains the one-way clutch (C3), mode CD2 (dual electric motor operation) is available.

Like the 5ET50 (MKV), Motor/Generator A in the 4EL70 was designed to eliminate the use of rare earth materials; M/G B is related to the traction motor used for the Chevrolet Spark EV.

Voltec (Generation 2) variations
Specification Vehicle	Gasoline engine	Electric			Combined output	Consumption / Economy		
Specification Vehicle	Gasoline engine	M/G A	M/G B	Battery	Combined output	EV	Hybrid (City/Hwy)	Electric range
Chevrolet Volt	1.5 L L3A I4; 101 hp (75 kW); 103 lb⋅ft (140 N⋅m)	48 kW (64 hp); 118 N⋅m (87 lbf⋅ft)	87 kW (117 hp); 280 N⋅m (210 lbf⋅ft)	18.4 kW-hr	149 hp (111 kW); 294 lb⋅ft (399 N⋅m)	106 mpg‑e (19.8 kWh/100 km)	43 / 42 mpg_{‑US} (5.5 / 5.6 l/100 km)	53 mi (85 km)
Chevrolet Malibu Hybrid	1.8 L LKN I4; 122 hp (91 kW); 130 lb⋅ft (180 N⋅m)	55 kW (74 hp)	76 kW (102 hp); 306 N⋅m (226 lbf⋅ft)	1.5 kW-hr	182 hp (136 kW); 277 lb⋅ft (376 N⋅m)	—N/a	49 / 43 mpg_{‑US} (4.8 / 5.5 l/100 km)	—N/a
Cadillac CT6 PHEV	2.0 L LTG I4T; 265 hp (198 kW); 295 lb⋅ft (400 N⋅m)	74.5 kW (99.9 hp)	74.5 kW (99.9 hp)	18.4 kW-hr	335 hp (250 kW); 432 lb⋅ft (586 N⋅m)	62 mpg‑e (34 kWh/100 km)	23 / 29 mpg_{‑US} (10.2 / 8.1 l/100 km)	31 mi (50 km)

== Vehicles ==
=== Production vehicles, Voltec Generation 1 ===
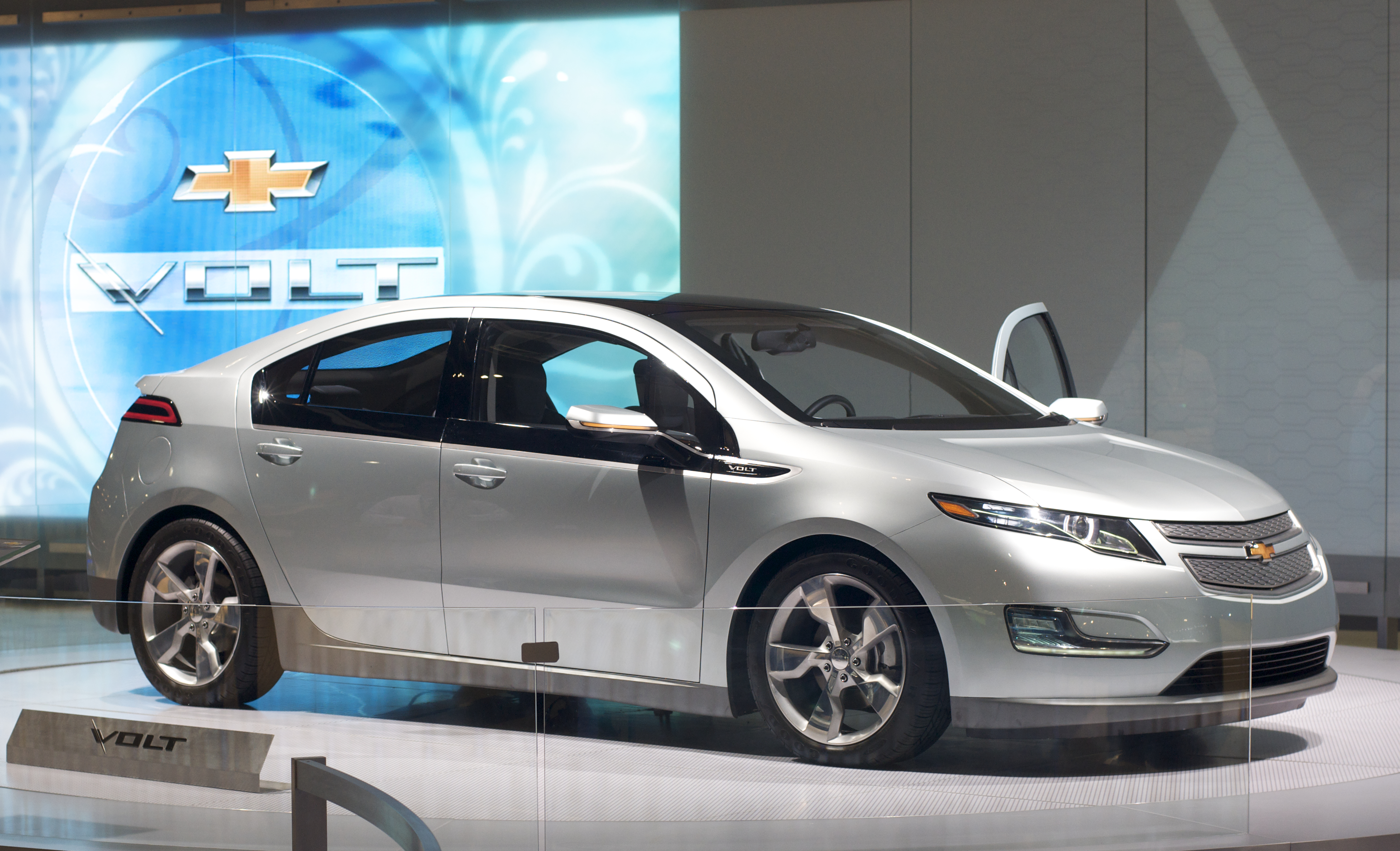
Chevrolet Volt (G1)

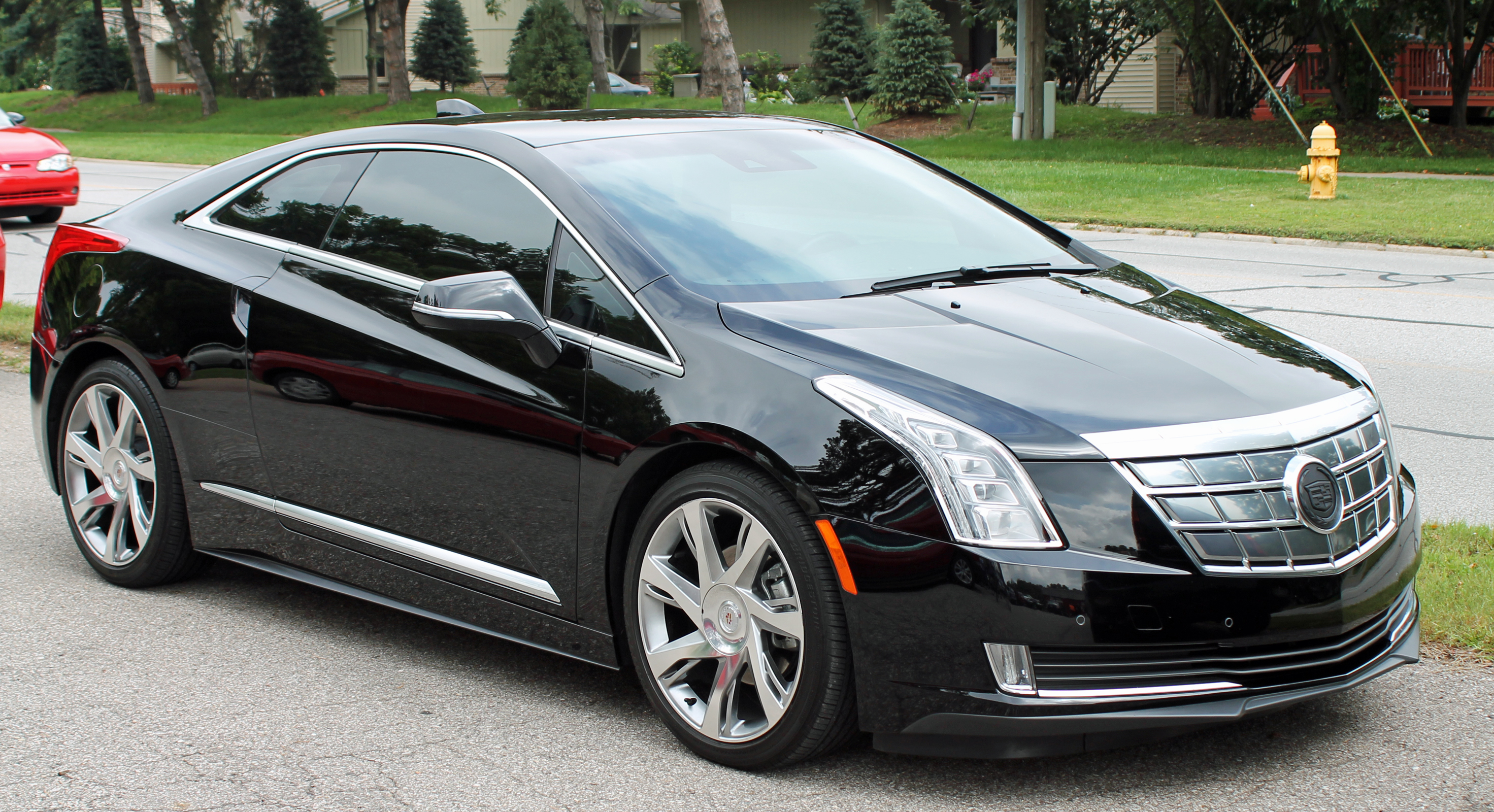
Cadillac ELR

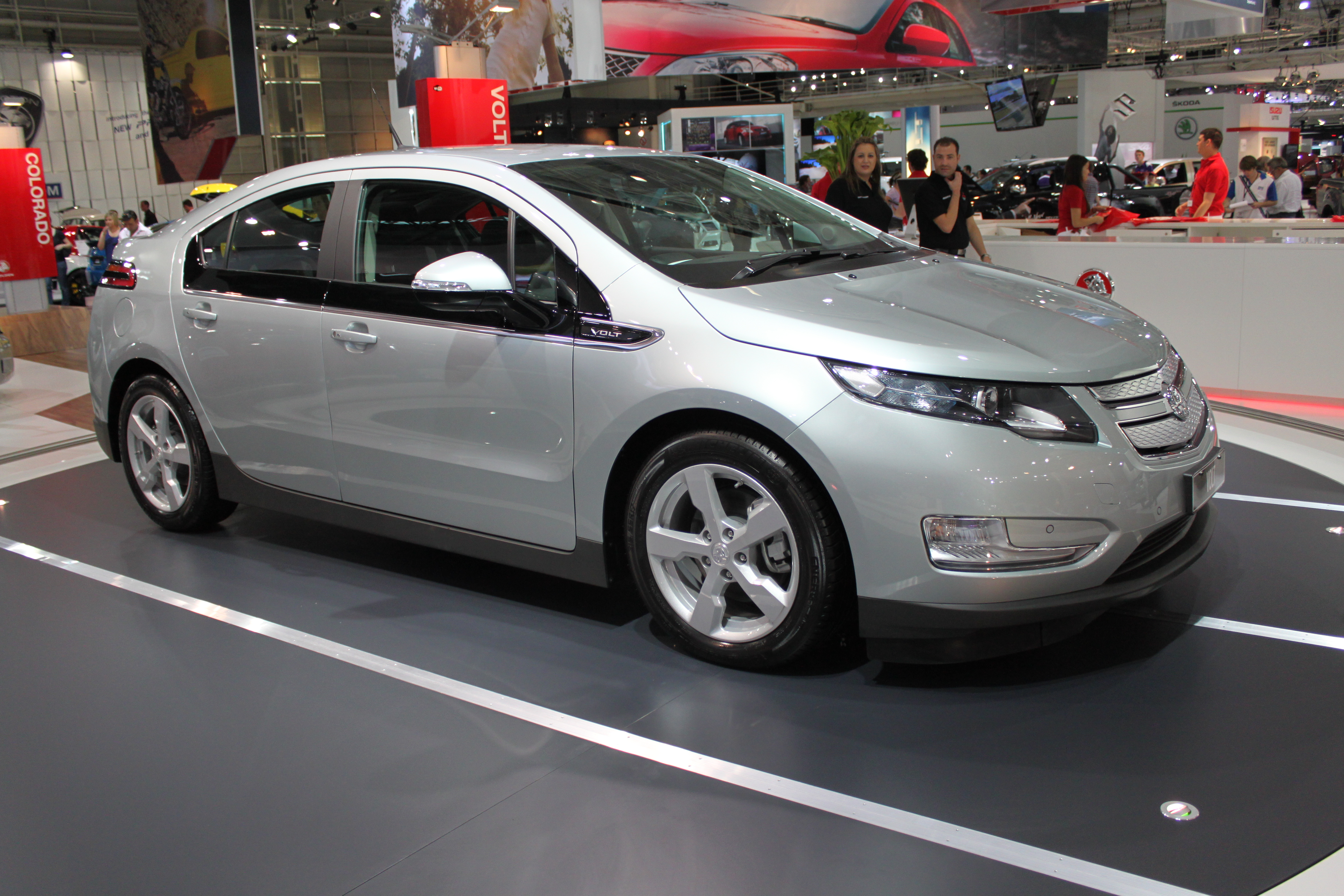
Holden Volt (Australia)

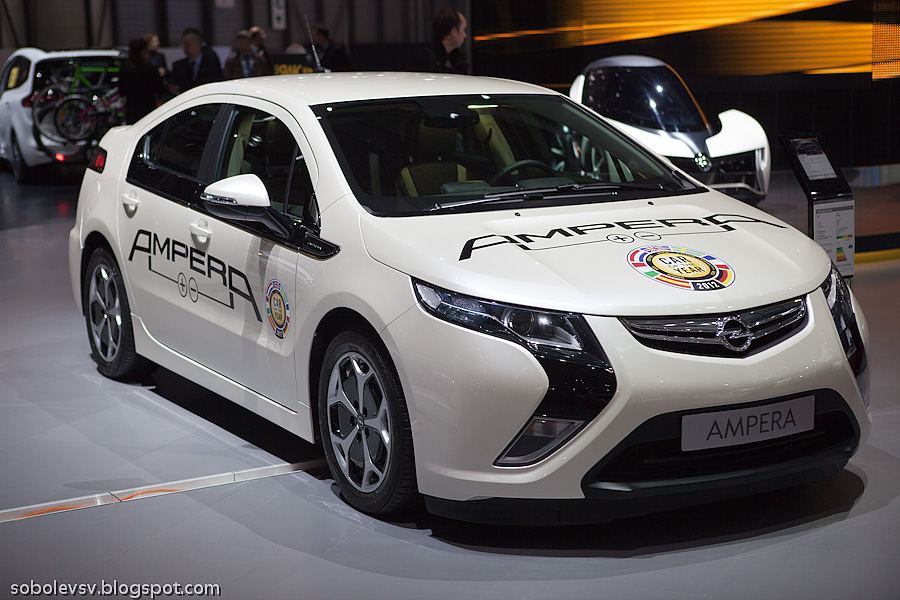
Opel Ampera (Europe)

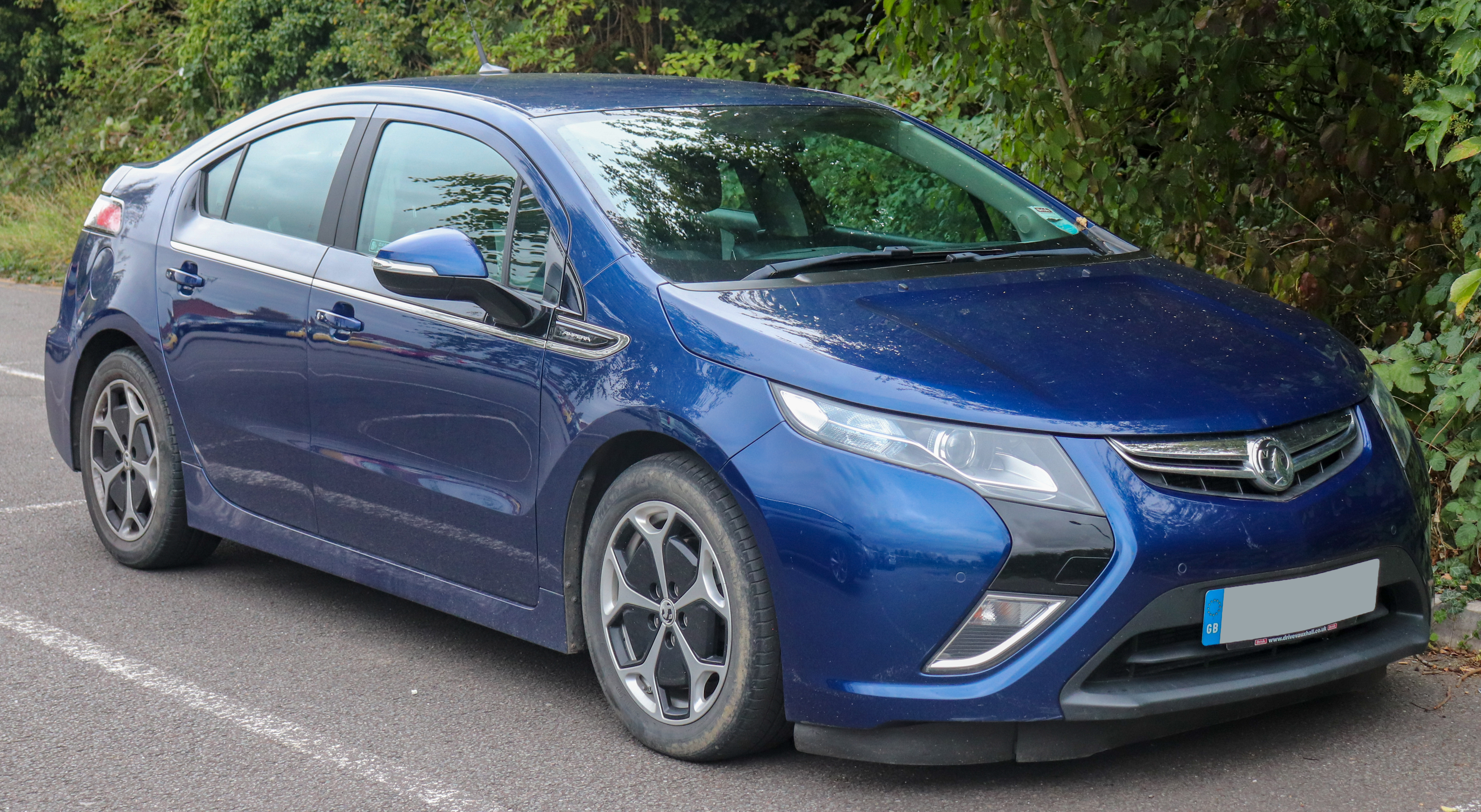
Vauxhall Ampera (United Kingdom)
- Chevrolet Volt (first generation) (sold in Australia, Europe, and the United Kingdom as Holden Volt and Opel/Vauxhall Ampera)
- Cadillac ELR

GM chose its Global Delta II compact vehicle architecture for its first Voltec applications. Volt Production began in November 2010 with the first Volts delivered to retail customers in December 2010

=== Production vehicles, Voltec Generation 2 ===
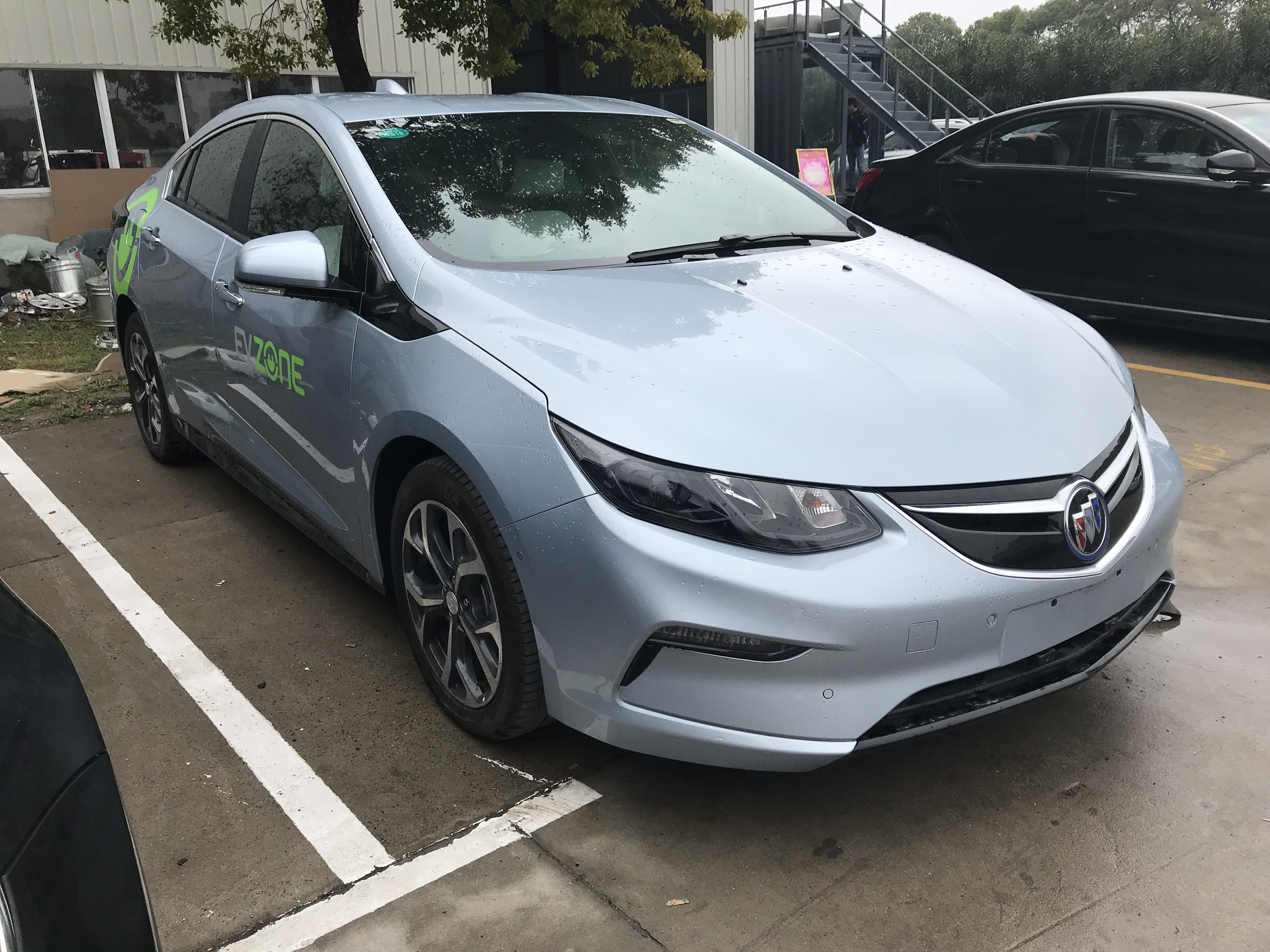
Buick Velite 5 (China)

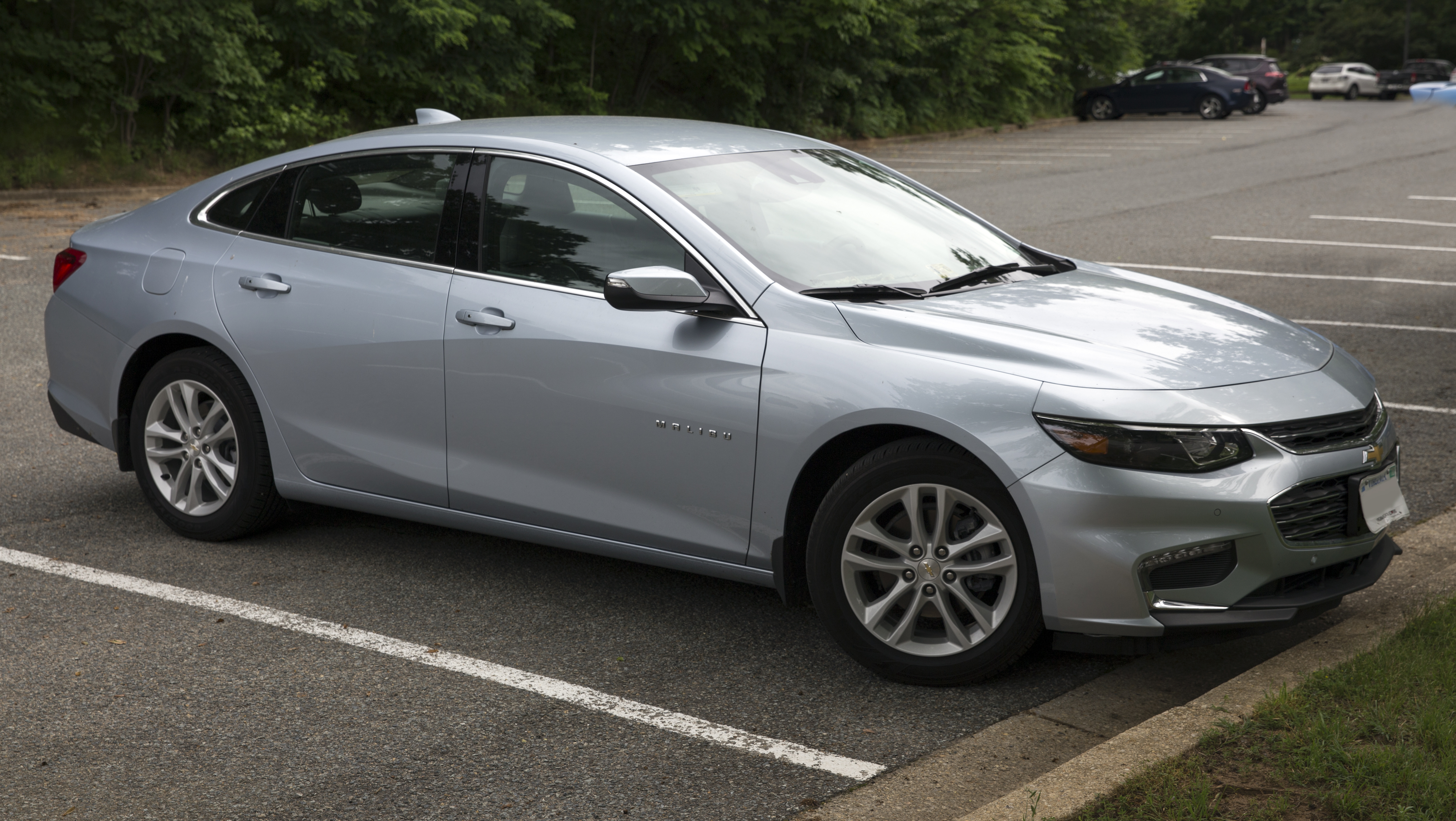
Chevrolet Malibu Hybrid

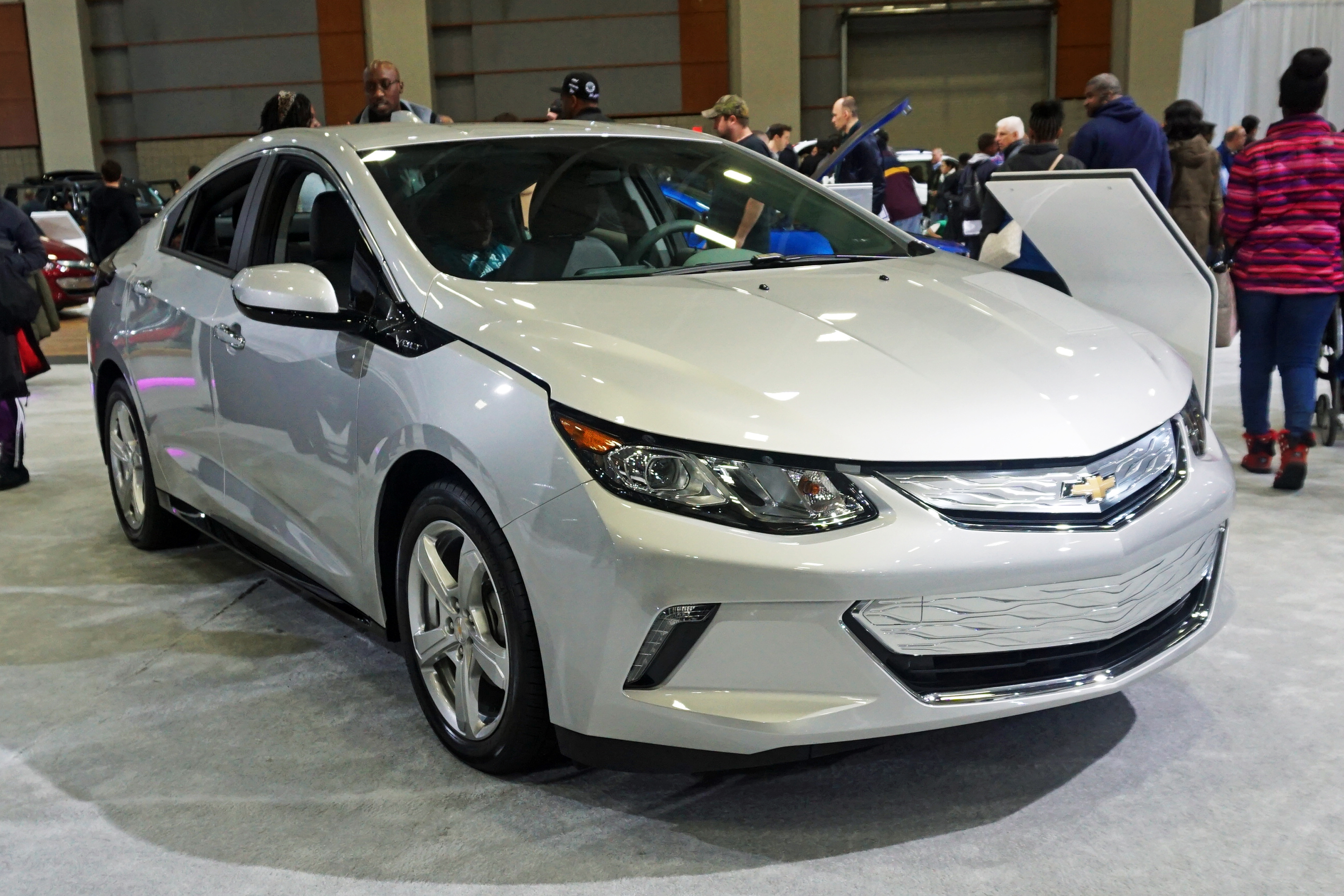
Chevrolet Volt (G2)
- Chevrolet Volt (second generation), MY 2016, Plug-In Hybrid; sold in China as the Buick Velite 5
- Chevrolet Malibu Hybrid MY 2016, Hybrid
- Cadillac CT6 PHEV, 2017, Plug-In Hybrid

=== Concept vehicles ===
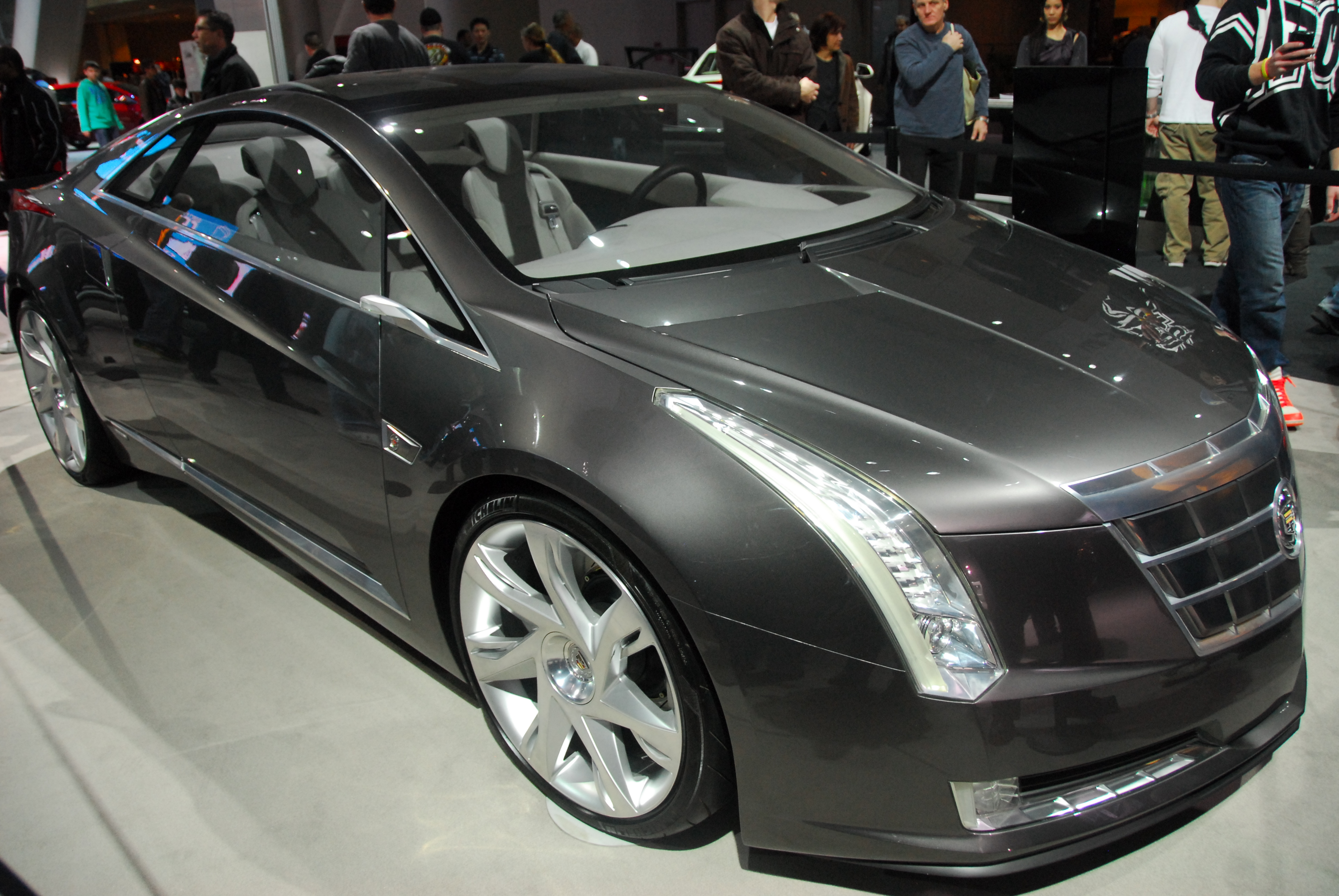
Cadillac Converj

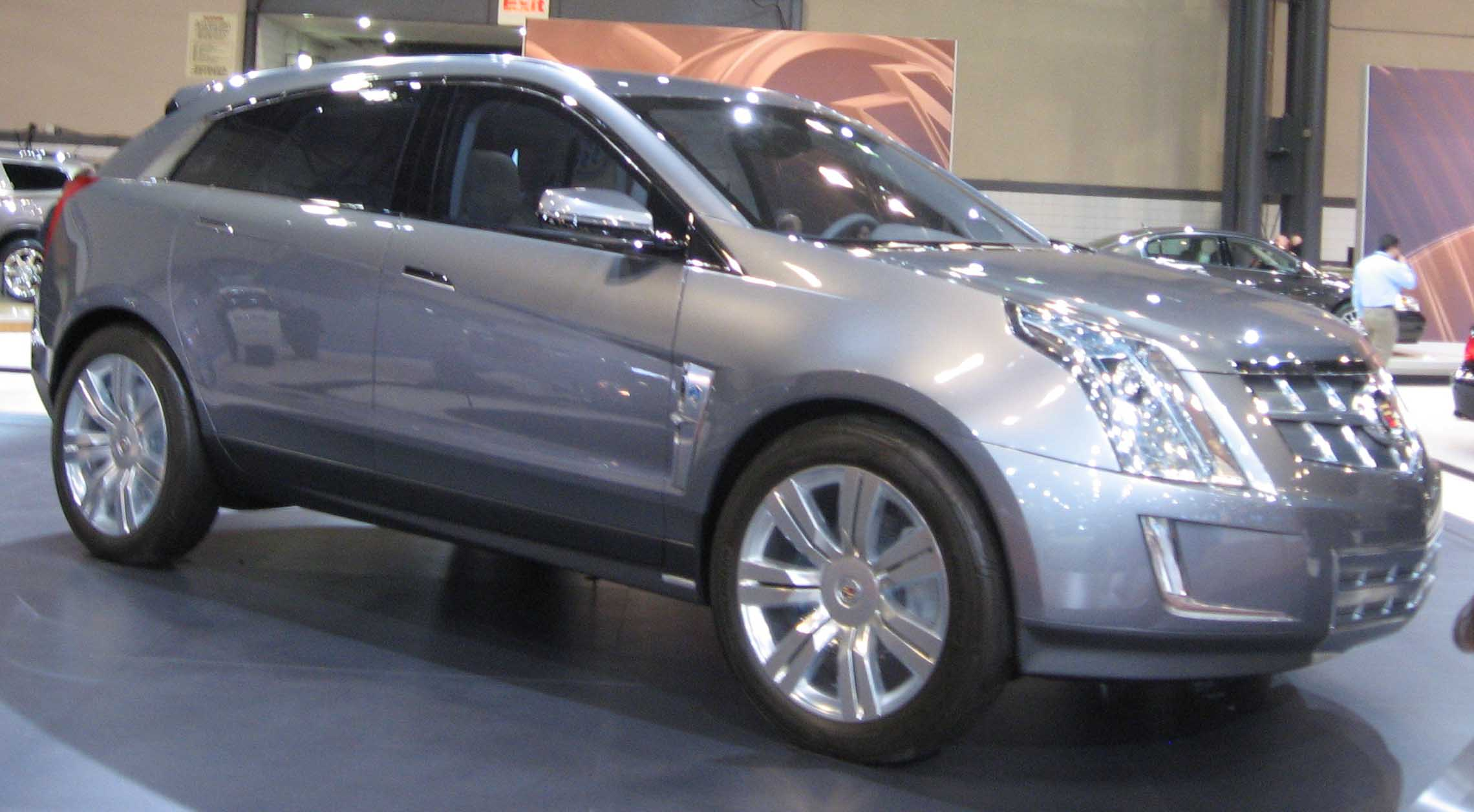
Cadillac Provoq

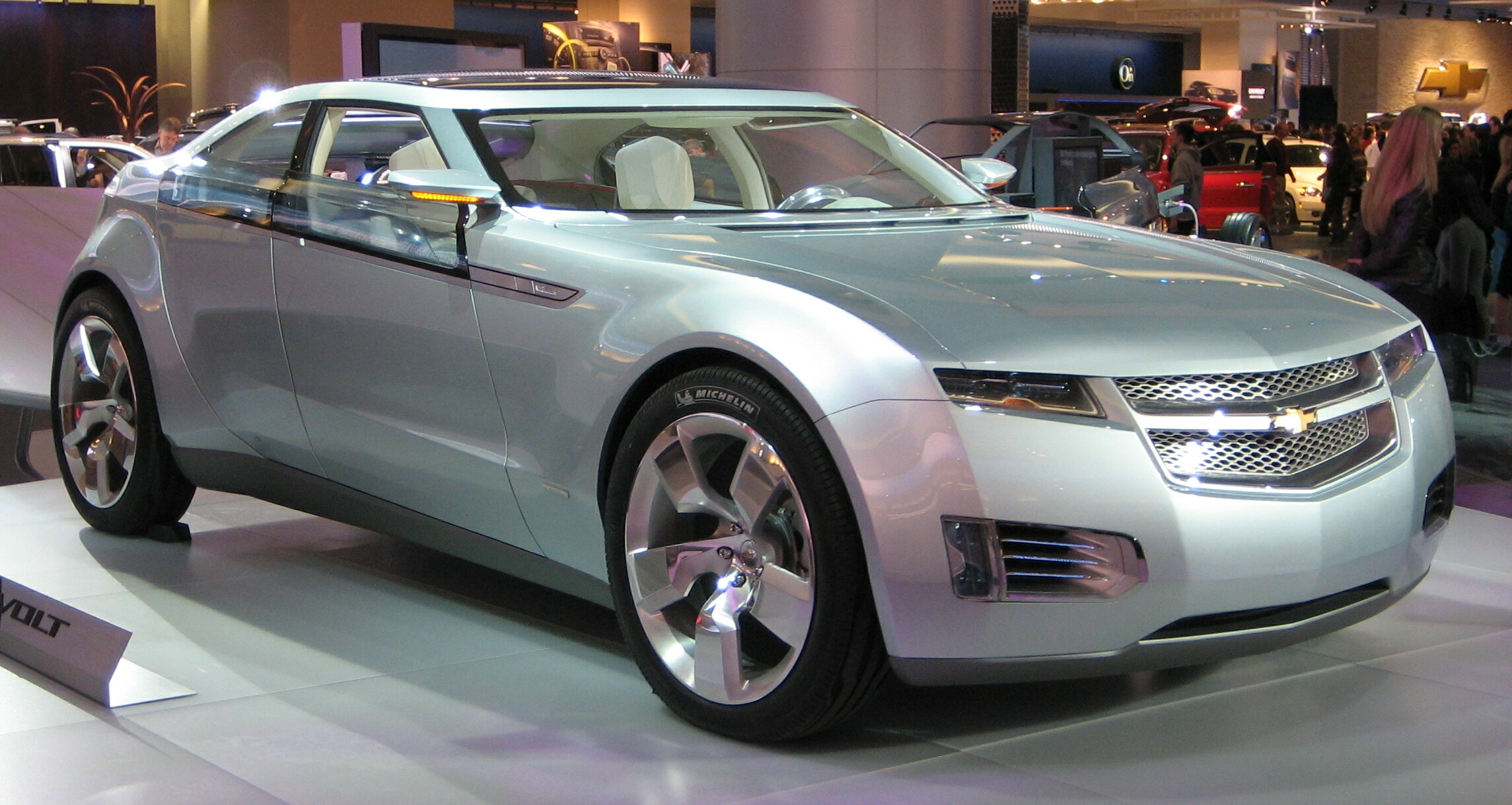
Chevrolet Volt (concept)

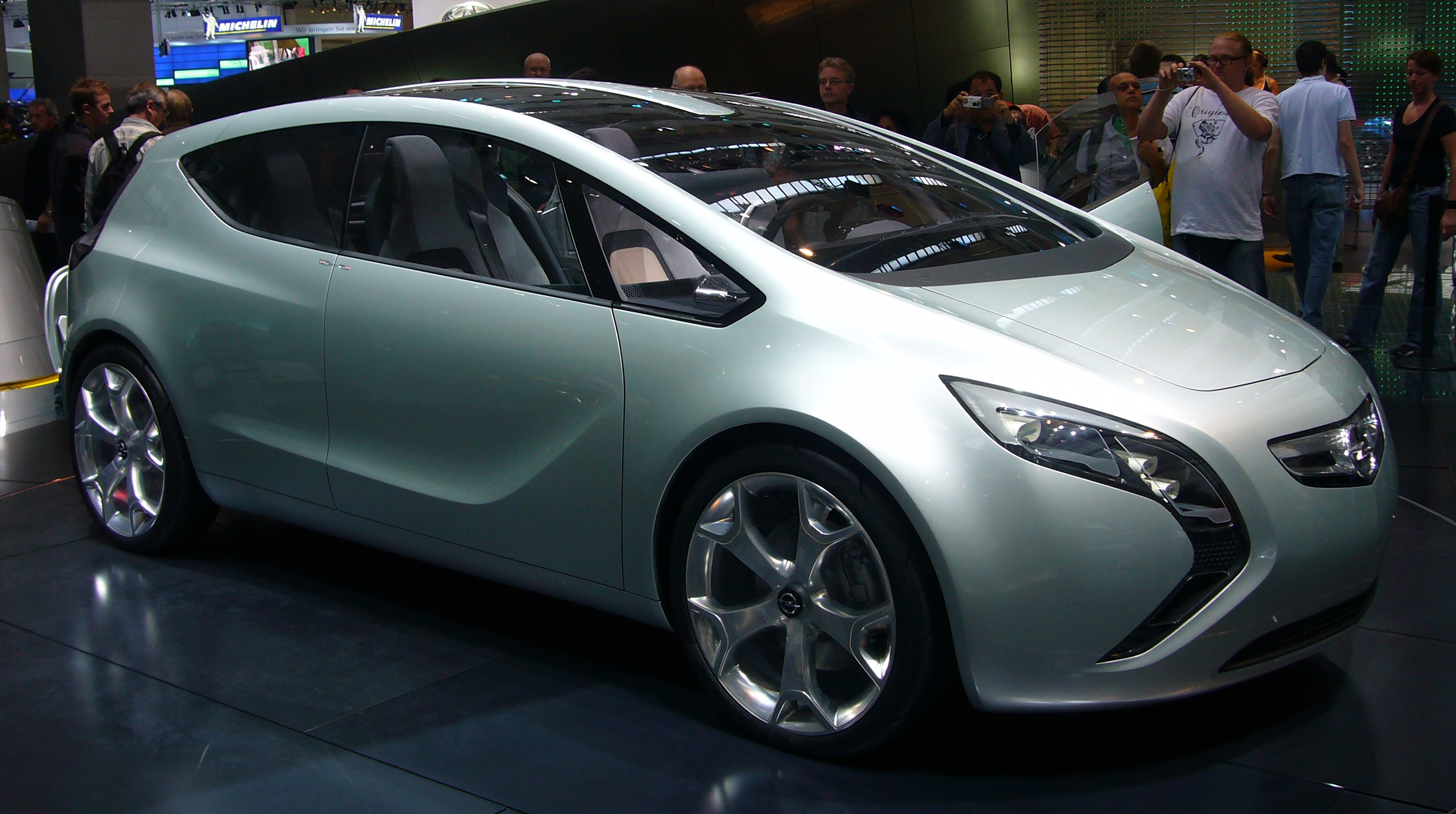
Opel Flextreme

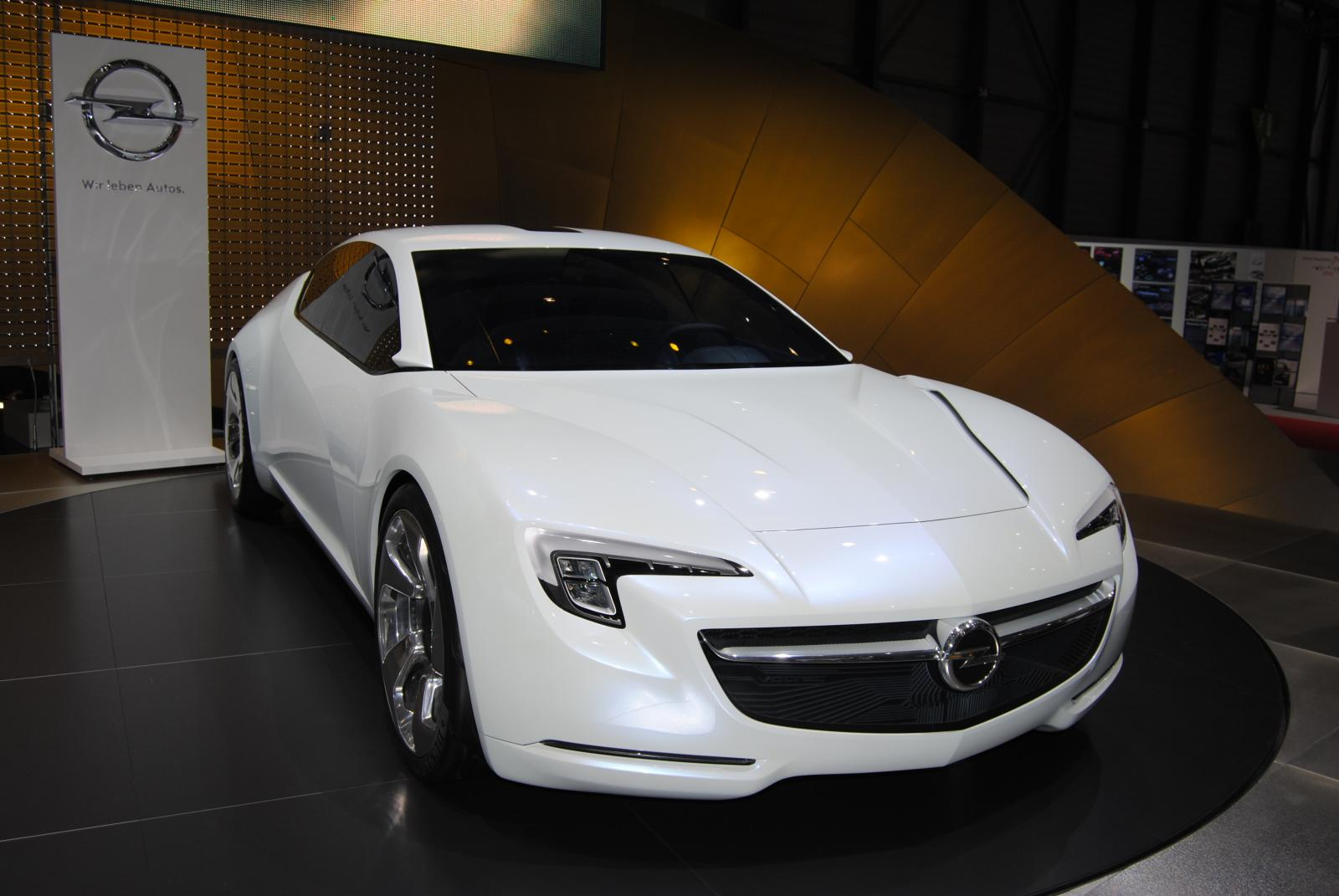
Opel Flextreme GT/E

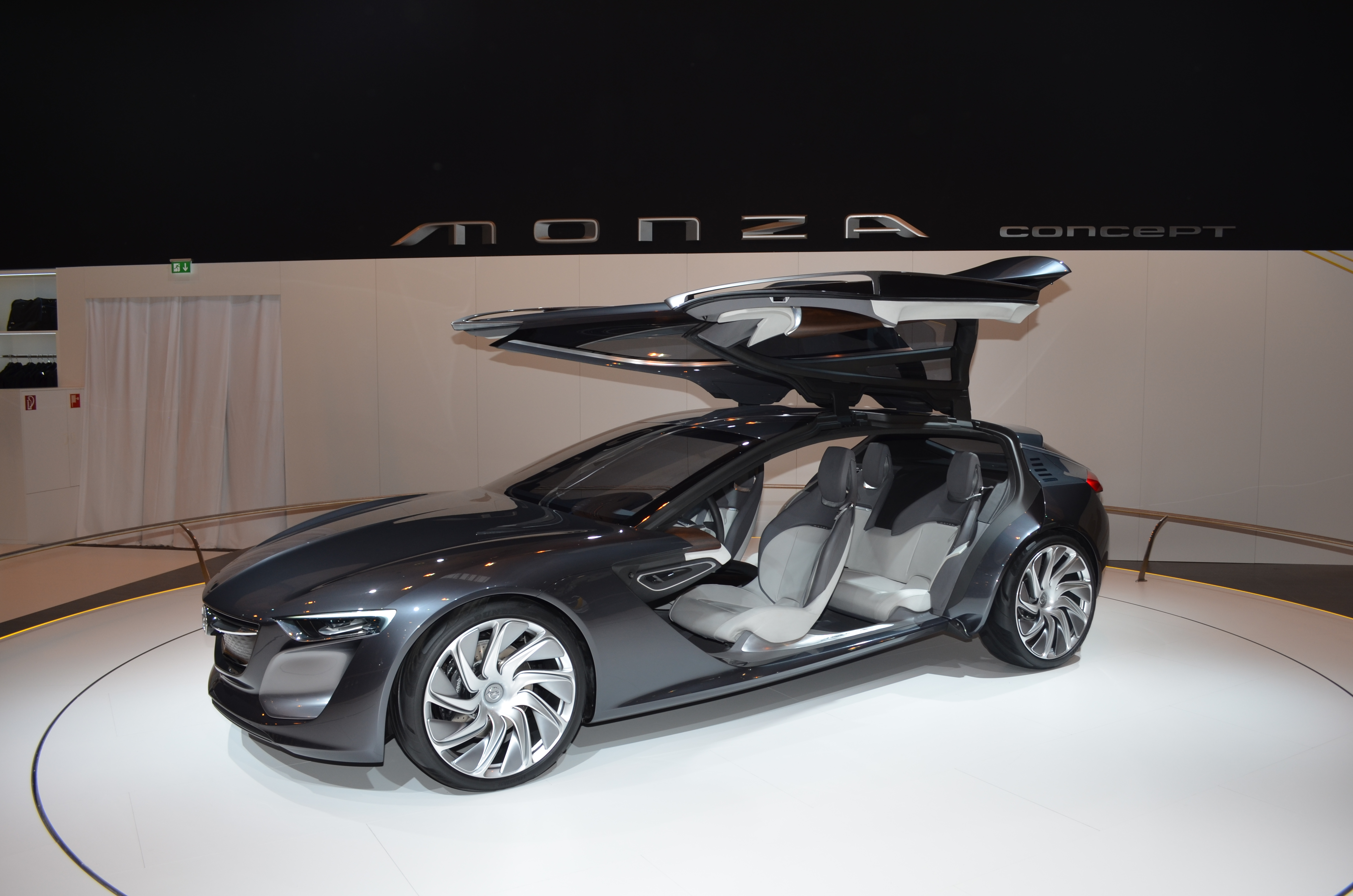
Opel Monza Concept
- Cadillac Converj
- Cadillac Provoq
- Opel Flextreme
- Opel Flextreme GT/E
- Opel Monza Concept

== See also ==
- List of GM engines
- List of GM transmissions
- Global Hybrid Cooperation, a two-mode hybrid technology developed in parallel with Voltec by General Motors and partners
