= Opel Flextreme GT/E =

Opel Flextreme GT/E Concept
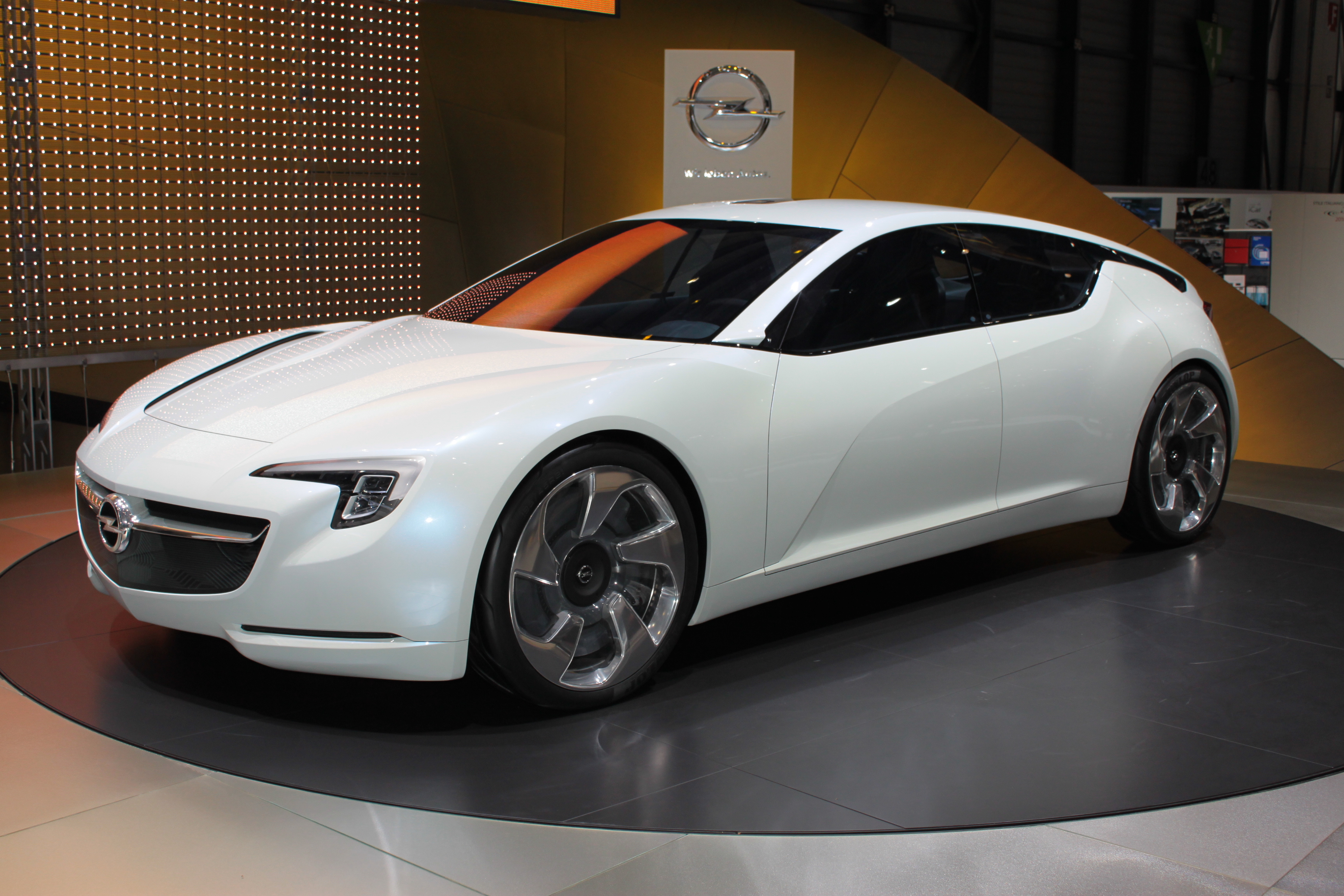

Overview
- Manufacturer: Opel
- Production: 2010 (Concept car)

Body and chassis
- Class: Grand Tourer (S)
- Body style: 5-door 2+2 fastback coupé
- Layout: Front-engine, rear-wheel drive
- Related: Opel Monza Concept

Dimensions
- Wheelbase: 2,900 mm (114.2 in)
- Length: 4,760 mm (187.4 in)
- Width: 1,870 mm (73.6 in)
- Height: 1,310 mm (51.6 in)

The Opel Flextreme GT/E Concept is a grand tourer concept car manufactured by Opel and based on the powertrain of GM Voltec. It is a five-door 2+2 fastback coupé with rear suicide doors.

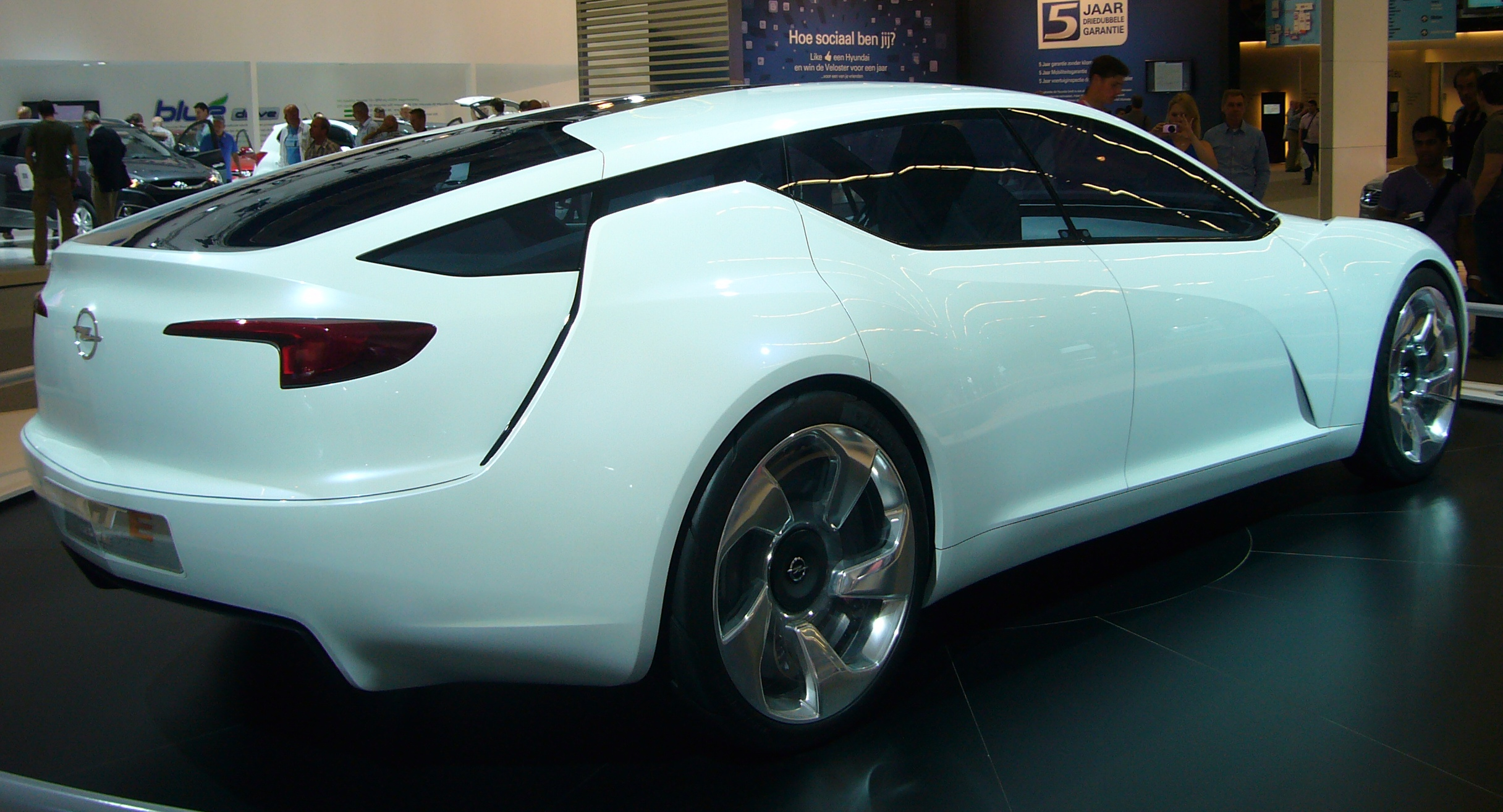
Rear view

The Flextreme GT/E premiered at the 2010 Geneva Motor Show. Later that year, the concept received the Red Dot Design Award, after being chosen from 12,000 submissions from 60 countries.
