= Chevrolet Volt (second generation) =

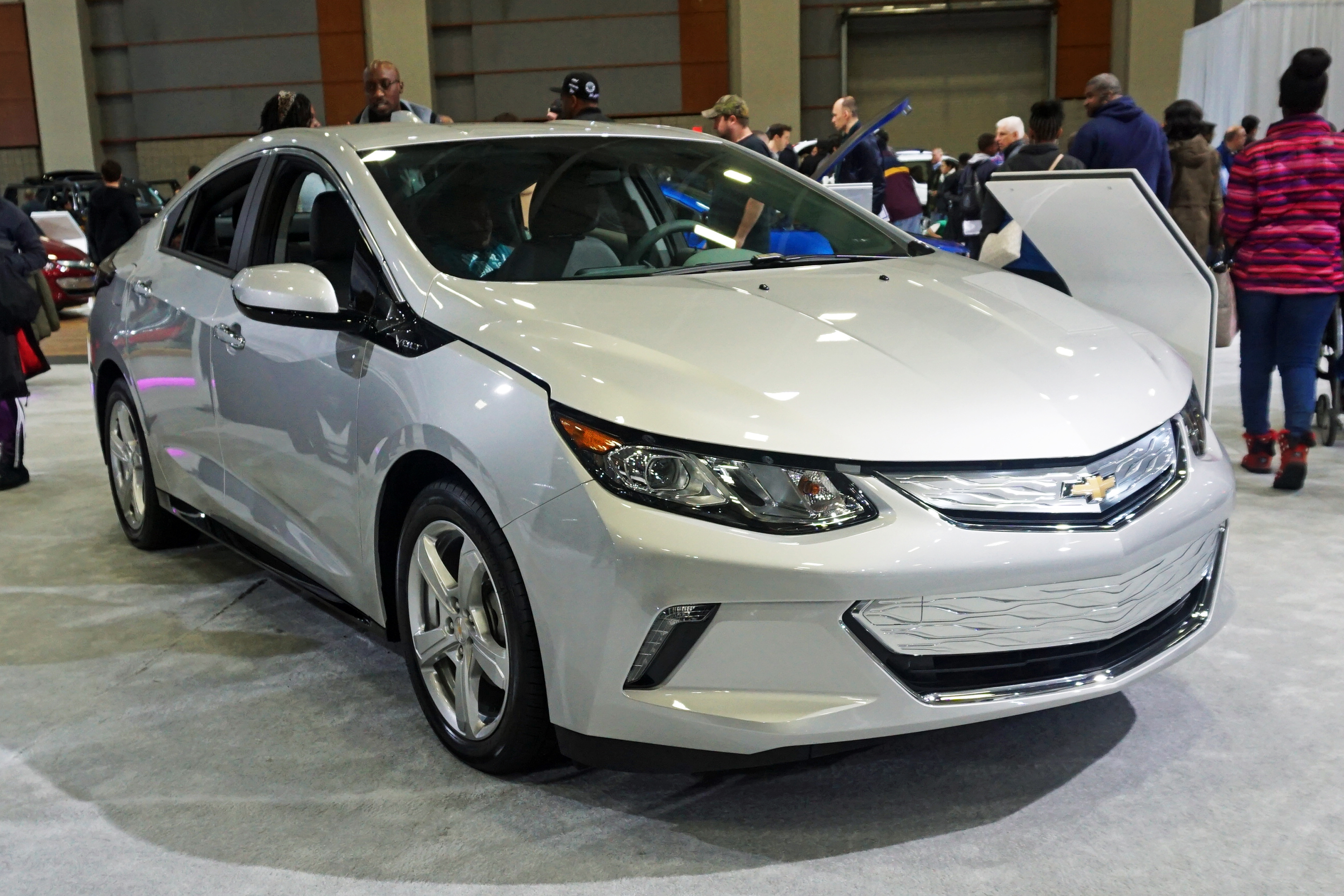
- 2017 Chevrolet Volt

Overview
- Manufacturer: General Motors
- Also called: Buick Velite 5 (China)
- Production: 2015 – February 2019
- Model years: 2016–2019
- Assembly: United States: Detroit, Michigan (Detroit/Hamtramck Assembly); China: Jinqiao, Shanghai (SAIC-GM, Buick Velite 5)
- Designer: John Cafaro

Body and chassis
- Class: Compact car (C)
- Body style: 5-door liftback
- Layout: Front-engine, front-wheel drive
- Platform: GM D2UX platform
- Related: Chevrolet Malibu Hybrid

Powertrain
- Engine: 1x 101 hp (75 kW) 1.5 L L3A I4 (gasoline)
- Electric motor: 1x 87 kW (117 hp); 1x 48 kW (64 hp); permanent magnet motor/generators
- Transmission: Voltec 5ET50 Multi-mode electric transaxle
- Hybrid drivetrain: E-REV GM Voltec
- Battery: 18.4 kWh, 14 kWh usable
- Range: 420 mi (680 km)
- Electric range: 53 mi (85 km)
- Plug-in charging: SAE J1772: 120 V (13 hours), 240 V (4.5 hours) AC

Dimensions
- Wheelbase: 106.1 in (2,695 mm)
- Length: 180.4 in (4,582 mm)
- Width: 71.2 in (1,808 mm)
- Height: 56.4 in (1,433 mm)
- Curb weight: 3,543 lb (1,607 kg)

Chronology
- Predecessor: Chevrolet Volt (first generation)
- Successor: Buick Velite 6 (for Velite 5)

The second generation Chevrolet Volt is a extended-range electric compact liftback that was produced by General Motors under the Chevrolet brand. It debuted at the 2015 North American International Auto Show to replace the original Volt, on sale since 2010. Retail deliveries as a 2016 model year began in October 2015 in the U.S. and Canada, and it was released in Mexico in December 2015. Availability of the 2016 model was limited to California and the other 10 states that follow California's zero emission vehicle regulations. It went on sale as a 2017 model year in the rest of the U.S. in February 2016. Volt production ended on February 15, 2019.

Featuring a restyled exterior and interior, the Volt's revised battery system and drivetrain allow, under the United States Environmental Protection Agency (EPA) cycle, an all-electric range of 53 mi (85 km), up from the first generation's 38 mi (61 km). The EPA combined fuel economy in gasoline-only mode was rated at 42 mpg_{‑US} (5.6 L/100 km; 50 mpg_{‑imp}), up from 37 mpg_{‑US} (6.4 L/100 km; 44 mpg_{‑imp}) for the previous generation. The official rating for combined city/highway fuel economy in all-electric mode is 106 miles per gallon gasoline equivalent (MPG-e), up from 98 MPG-e for the 2015 first generation model.

== Specifications ==
The Volt's revised batteries and Voltec powertrain feature a larger 1.5-liter range extender engine tuned for regular gasoline instead of premium required by the first generation. The new engine is rated for 101 horsepower (75 kW), representing approximately 20% more power than the engine used in the previous generation.

As with the first Voltec iteration, the second generation battery pack uses battery cells by LG Chem. Their new chemistry reportedly stores 20% more electrical energy. The second generation battery pack uses fewer cells (192 vs 288), weighs 29 lb (13 kg) less and features a capacity increased to 18.4 kWh. The battery pack used a power controller integral to the motor housing with electric motors weighing 100 lb (45 kg) less while using less rare-earth metal.

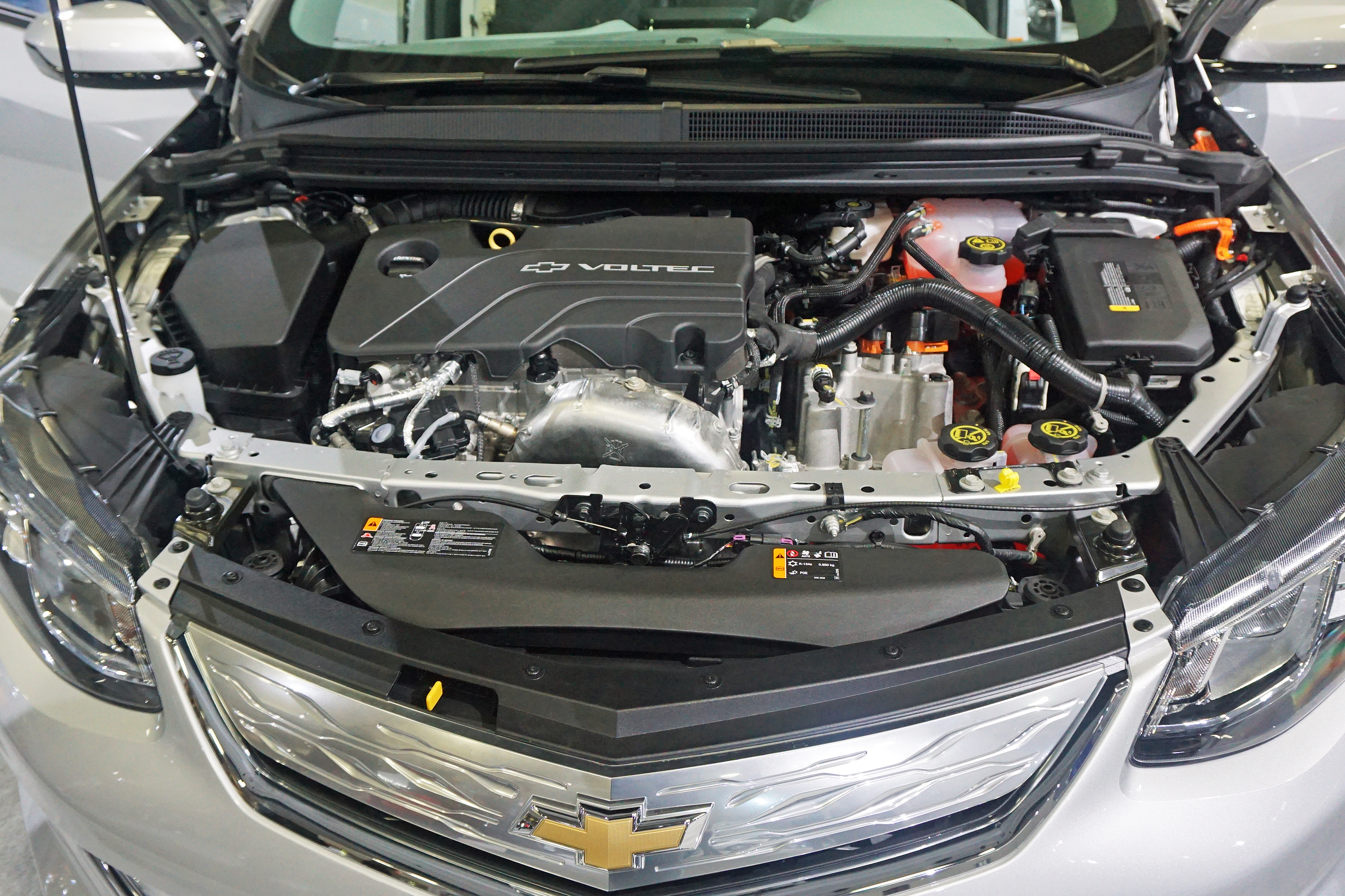
Voltec 1.5L gasoline-powered engine (left) and power inverter on top of the electric motor (right)

Under the United States Environmental Protection Agency (EPA) cycle, the 2016 model year Volt all-electric range is 53 mi (85 km), up from the first generation's 38 mi (61 km). Total driving range is 420 mi (680 km). The EPA combined fuel economy in gasoline-only mode was rated at 42 mpg_{‑US} (5.6 L/100 km; 50 mpg_{‑imp}), up from 37 mpg_{‑US} (6.4 L/100 km; 44 mpg_{‑imp}) for the previous generation. The official rating for combined city/highway fuel economy in all-electric mode is 106 miles per gallon gasoline equivalent (MPG-e), up from 98 MPG-e for the 2015 first generation model. The combined gasoline-electricity fuel economy rating of the 2016 model year Volt is 77 mpg_{‑US} (3.1 L/100 km; 92 mpg_{‑imp}) equivalent, 82 MPG-e in city driving and 72 MPG-e in highway. Both the all-electric range and fuel economy ratings are the same for the 2017 model year Volt. As of March 2016, and excluding all-electric cars, only the BMW i3 REx has a better combined gasoline-electricity rating (88 MPG-e) than the Volt.

When it was released, the 53 mi (85 km) all-electric range was the second longest-range achieved by any plug-in hybrid car available for sale, only second to the BMW i3 REx, Chevrolet expects that many 2016 Volt owners will run using only the battery for 90% of their daily trips, up from 80% for the first generation owners based on OnStar data and other studies. The Volt's onboard charger can handle 3.6 kW, which is sufficient for overnight charging at the owner's home but falls short of the capabilities of public chargers. 7.2 kW charging system was standard on the 2019 Volt Premier and optional on the 2019 Volt LT. The Volt did not have a DC quick charging connector.

Comparison of fuel economy, out-of-pocket fuel costs and range for the two Volt generations as rated by EPA as of March 2016 with MPGe and conventional MPG^{(1)} (as displayed in the Monroney label and the US DoE fueleconomy.gov website)
Vehicle	Year model	Operating mode	EPA rated combined fuel economy	EPA rated city fuel economy	EPA rated highway fuel economy	Fuel cost to drive 25 miles	Annual fuel cost^{(1)} (15,000 mi)	EV range (miles)	Total range (miles)	Notes
Second-generation Volt	2016/17	Electricity only	106 mpg‑e (32 kW⋅h/100 mi; 19.8 kW⋅h/100 km)	113 mpg‑e (30 kW⋅h/100 mi; 18.5 kW⋅h/100 km)	99 mpg‑e (34 kW⋅h/100 mi; 21 kW⋅h/100 km)	$1.01	$650	53 mi (85 km)	430 mi (690 km)	Regular gasoline. The 2016/17 Volt has a combined gasoline/electricity rating of 77 mpg-e (city 82 mpg-e/hwy 72 mpg-e).
Second-generation Volt	2016/17	Gasoline only	42 mpg_{‑US} (5.6 L/100 km; 50 mpg_{‑imp})	43 mpg_{‑US} (5.5 L/100 km; 52 mpg_{‑imp})	42 mpg_{‑US} (5.6 L/100 km; 50 mpg_{‑imp})	$1.17	$650	53 mi (85 km)	430 mi (690 km)	Regular gasoline. The 2016/17 Volt has a combined gasoline/electricity rating of 77 mpg-e (city 82 mpg-e/hwy 72 mpg-e).
First-generation Volt	2013/15	Electricity only	98 mpg‑e (34 kW⋅h/100 mi; 21 kW⋅h/100 km)	-	-	$1.14	$750	38 mi (61 km)	380 mi (610 km)	Premium gasoline. The 2013/15 Volt has a combined gasoline/electricity rating of 62 mpg-e (city 63 mpg-e/hwy 61 mpg-e).
First-generation Volt	2013/15	Gasoline only	37 mpg_{‑US} (6.4 L/100 km; 44 mpg_{‑imp})	35 mpg_{‑US} (6.7 L/100 km; 42 mpg_{‑imp})	40 mpg_{‑US} (5.9 L/100 km; 48 mpg_{‑imp})	$1.63	$750	38 mi (61 km)	380 mi (610 km)	Premium gasoline. The 2013/15 Volt has a combined gasoline/electricity rating of 62 mpg-e (city 63 mpg-e/hwy 61 mpg-e).
Notes: (1) Based on 45% highway and 55% city driving. Electricity cost of US$0.13/kw-hr, premium gasoline price of US$2.41 per gallon, and regular gasoline price of US$1.96 per gallon (as of 18 March 2016). Conversion 1 gallon of gasoline=33.7 kW-hr.

Real-world driving reports from some Volt owners show they have been able to achieve maximum all-electric range of up to about 70 mi (110 km), depending on driving style and conditions, well in excess of the EPA estimate.

=== Performance ===
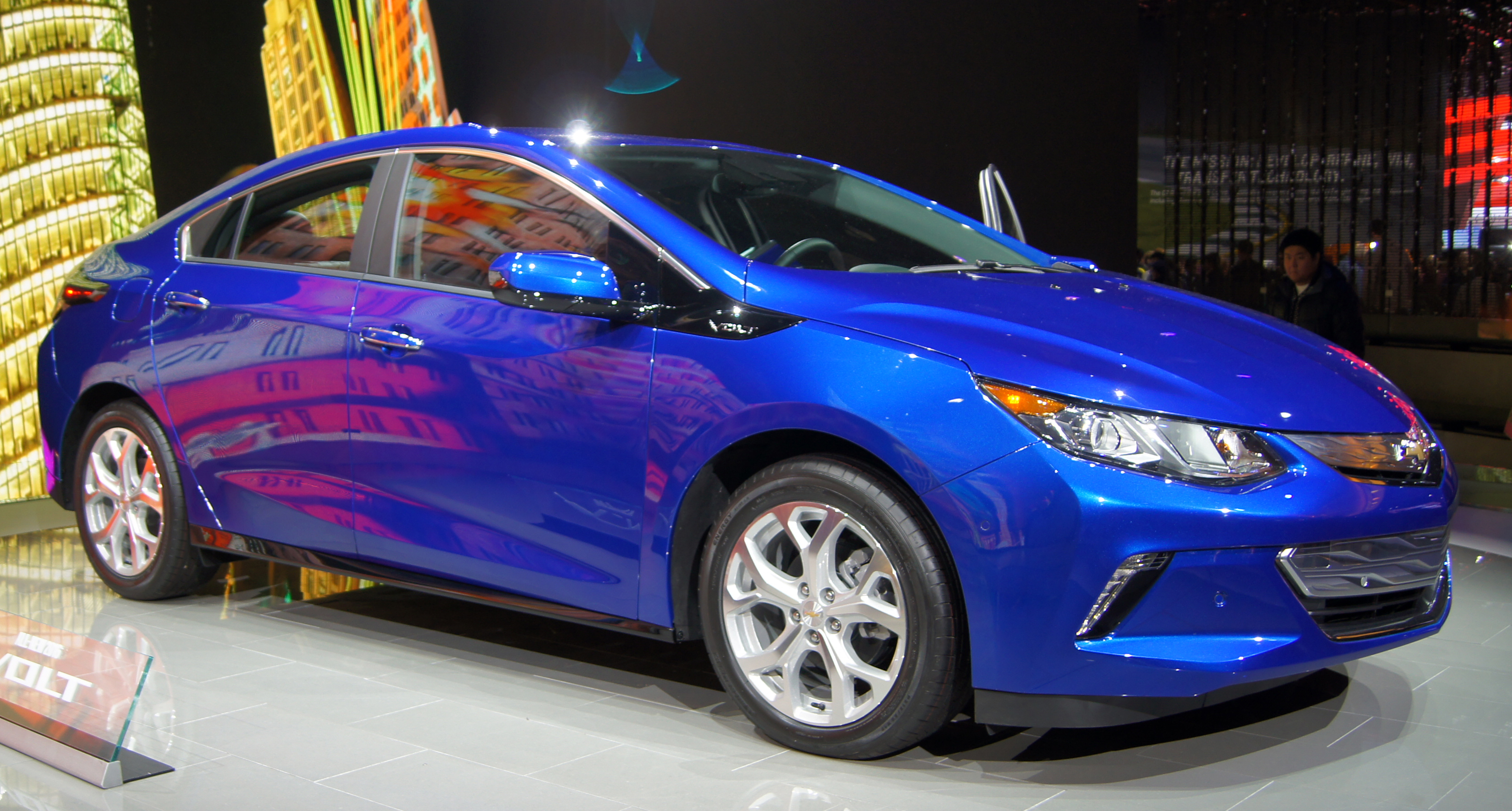
2016 Chevrolet Volt

- Top speed: 101 mph (163 km/h) (as tested)
- Acceleration:
  - 0–60 mph (0–97 km/h): 7.1–7.8 s
  - Standing 1/4 mile: 15.6 s @ 85.7 mph – 16.1 s at 86 mph

== Production and sales ==
The second generation Volt debuted at the 2015 North American International Auto Show. At the Volt's debut, GM engineers said the second generation Volt was developed using extensive input from first generation owners.

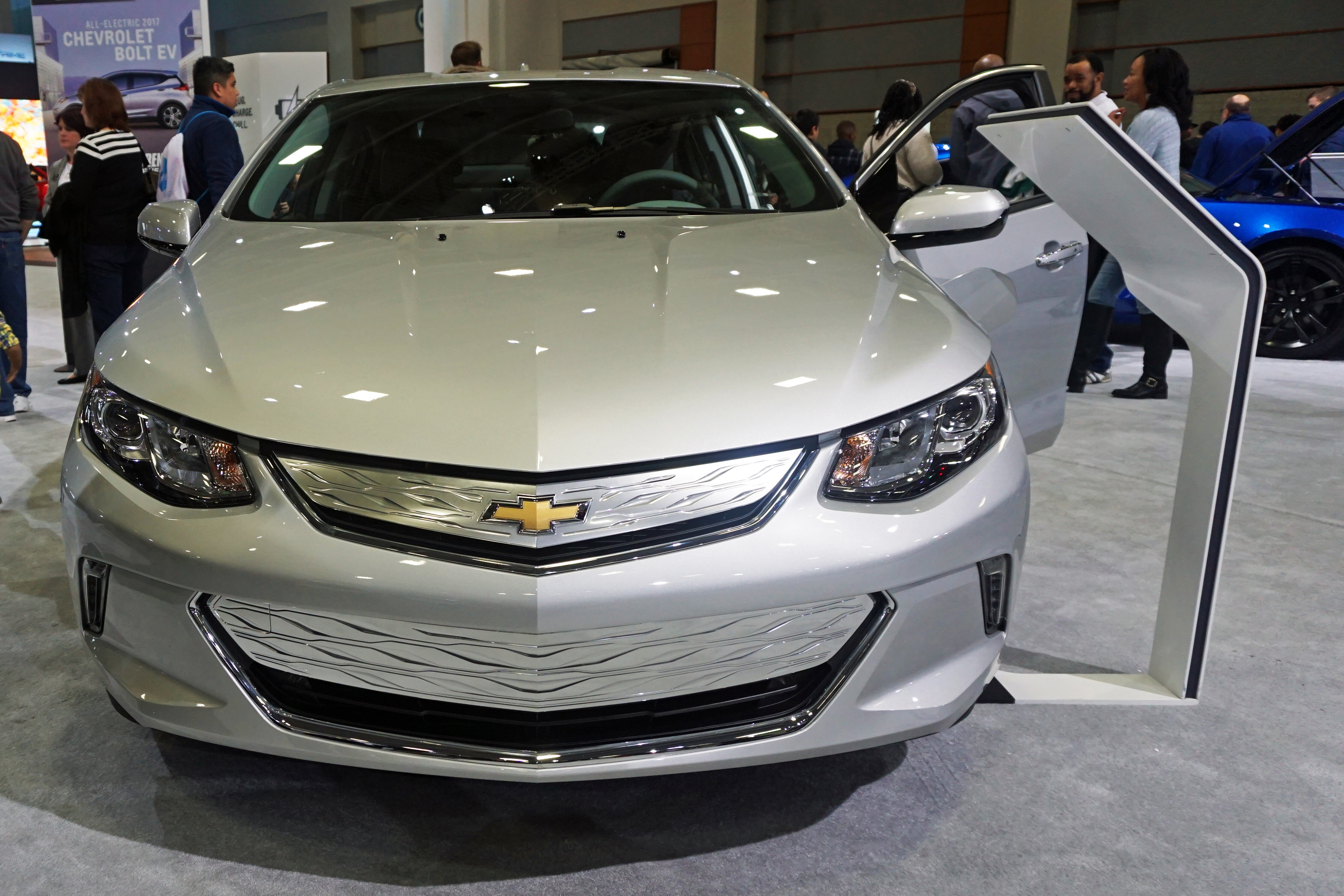
Frontal view of the 2017 model year Chevrolet Volt.

Production of the 2015 model year Volt ended by mid-May 2015, while manufacturing of pre-production units of the second generation began in March 2015. The 2016 Volt starts at US$33,170 before any available government incentives, plus US$825 for destination; this price is US$1,175 lower than the 2015 model year Volt. The order books for the second generation Volt opened in California on May 28, 2015. Series production began in August 2015. After California, initial deliveries of the 2016 Volt included Connecticut, Massachusetts, Maryland, Maine, New Hampshire, New Jersey, New York, Oregon, Rhode Island, and Vermont; these are the other states that follow California's zero emission vehicle regulations.

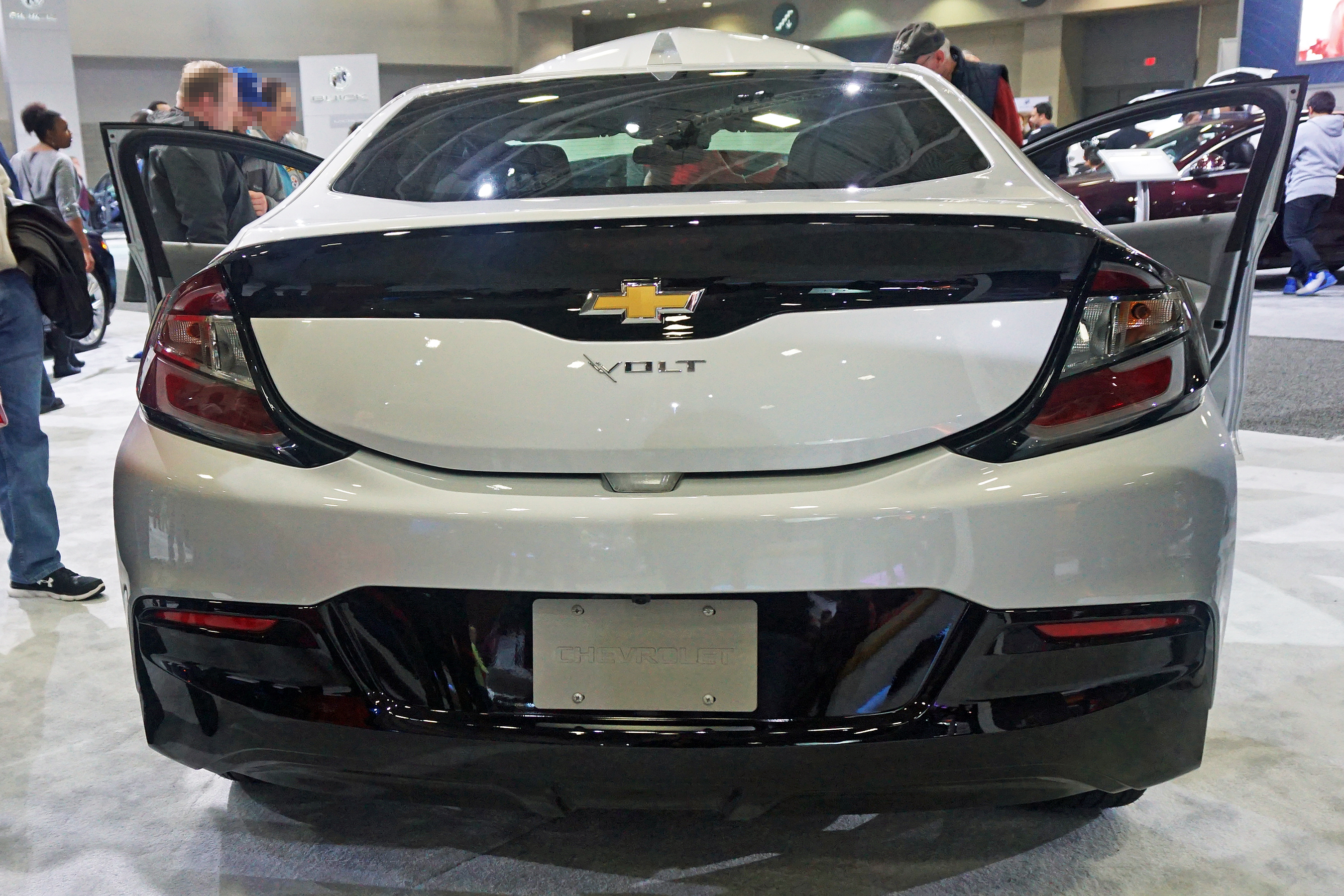
Rear view of the 2017 model year Chevrolet Volt

Deliveries to retail customers began in the U.S. and Canada in October 2015 as a 2016 model year. Availability in the American market was limited to California and the other 10 states that follow California's zero emission vehicle rules. GM scheduled the second generation Volt to go on sale as a 2017 model year in the 39 remaining states by early 2016. A total of 1,324 units of the second gen Volt were delivered in the U.S. in October 2015, out of 2,035 units sold that month. The second generation Volt was released for retail customers in Mexico in December 2015. Pricing starts at 638,000 pesos (~US$36,880).

Manufacturing of the 2017 model year Volt began in February 2016, and the first units arrived at dealerships at the end of February 2016. The 2017 model complies with stricter Tier 3 emissions requirements and is available nationwide. Pricing of the 2017 Volt starts at US$34,095, US$100 more than the 2016 model, while the Premier package starts at US$38,445. These prices do not include taxes or any applicable government incentives. The Premier model offers two optional Driver Confidence packages with blind-spot warning, rear cross-traffic alert, Collision avoidance systems, lane-keep assist, and intelligent high beams. The 2017 Premier also offers an adaptive cruise control option.

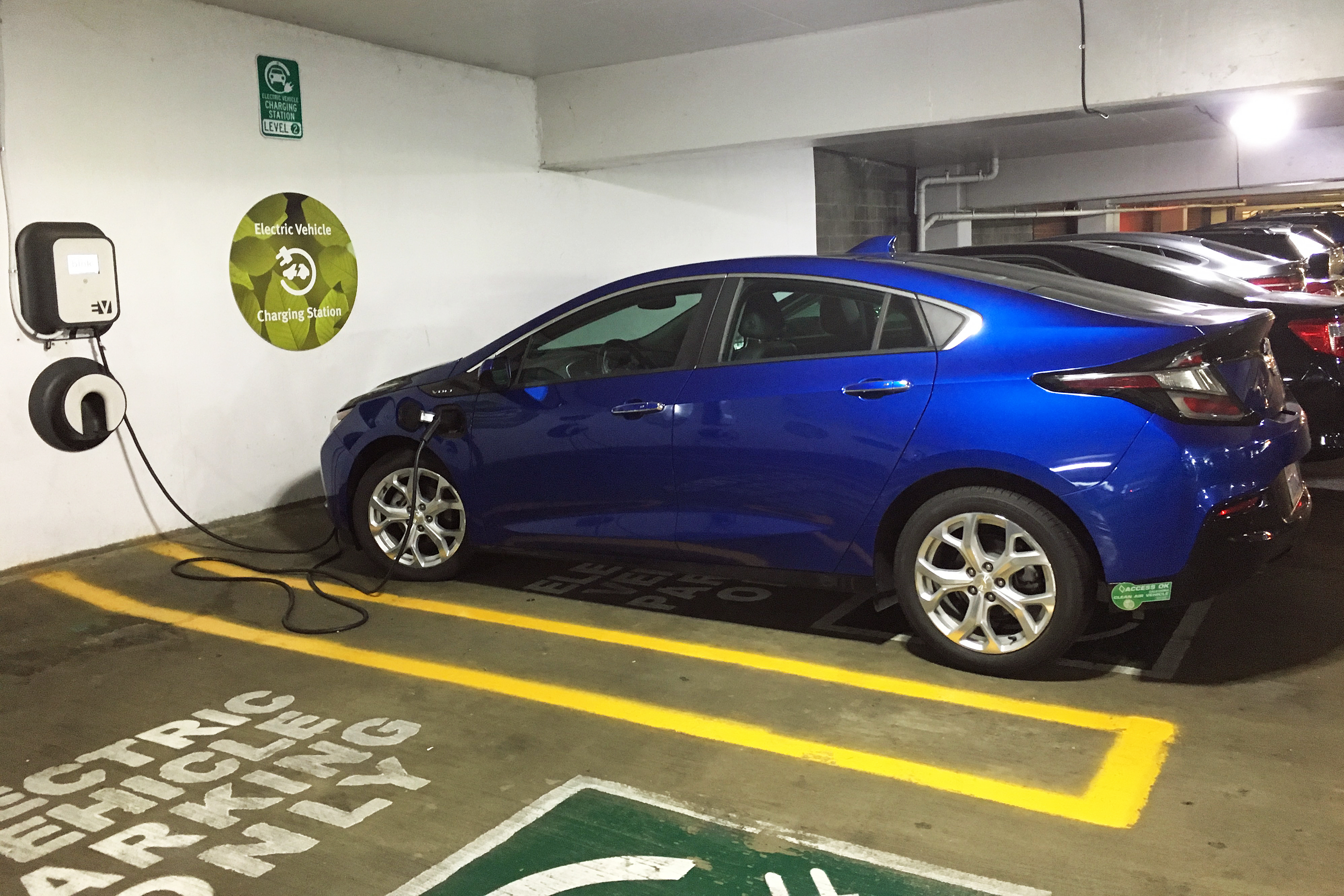
Chevrolet Volt charging at a Level 2 station

In July 2014, Opel announced that due to the slowdown in sales, the Ampera would be discontinued after the launch of the second generation Volt and that Opel planned to introduce in Europe a successor product in the electric vehicle segment. In April 2015, General Motors confirmed that it will not build the second generation Volt in right-hand-drive configuration. As only 246 units had been sold in Australia by mid-April 2015, the Holden Volt will be discontinued once the remaining stock is sold out.

The Buick Velite 5 was introduced at the 2017 Shanghai Auto Show, a rebadged second generation Chevrolet Volt tailored for the Chinese market. The "Velite 5" was planned to be manufactured in China., but in the event, the car was called the Buick Velite 6 by the time it was actually released into the Chinese market in 2019. This model is to be sold exclusively in China with the same powertrain.

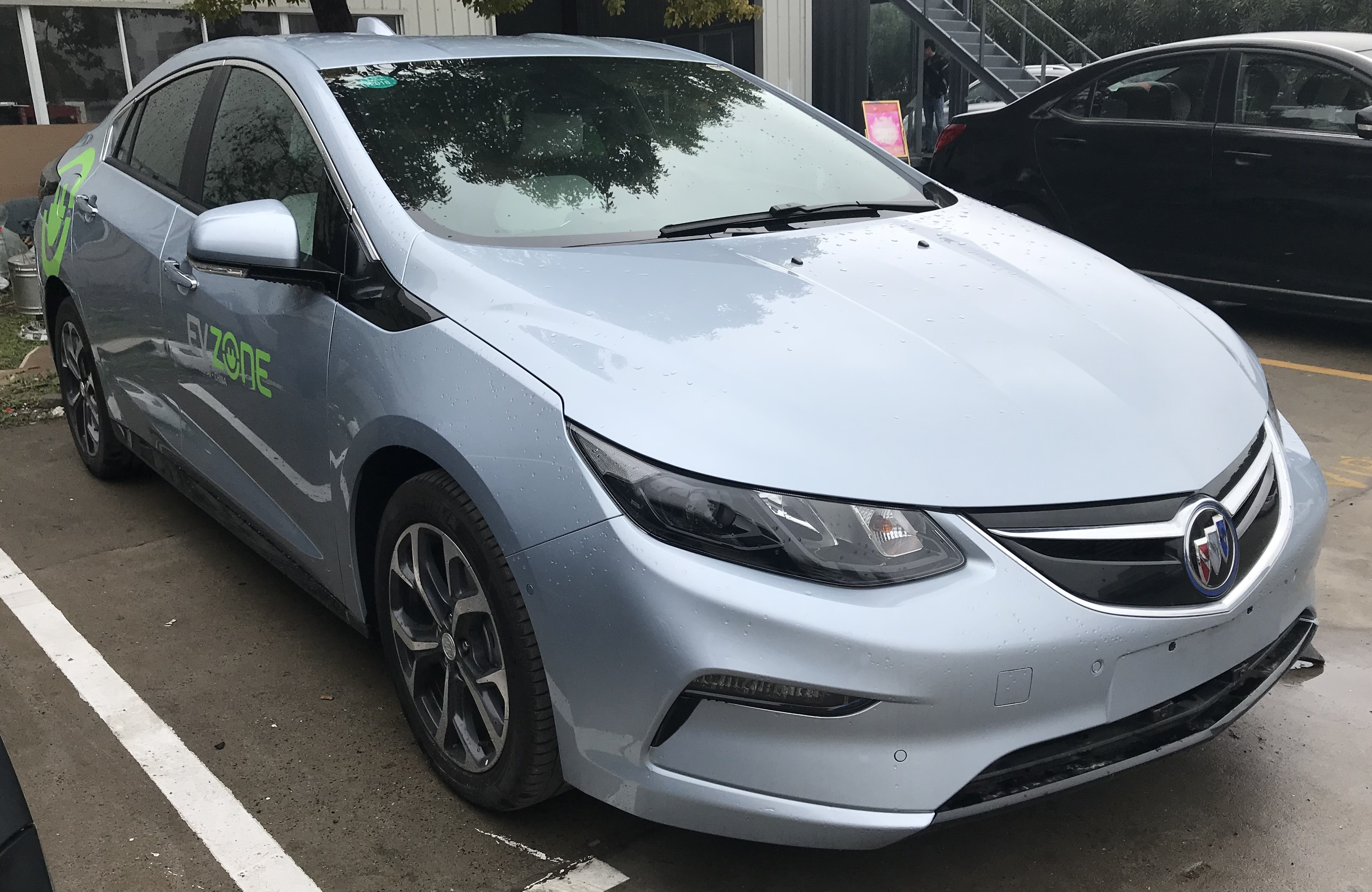
Buick Velite 5 front

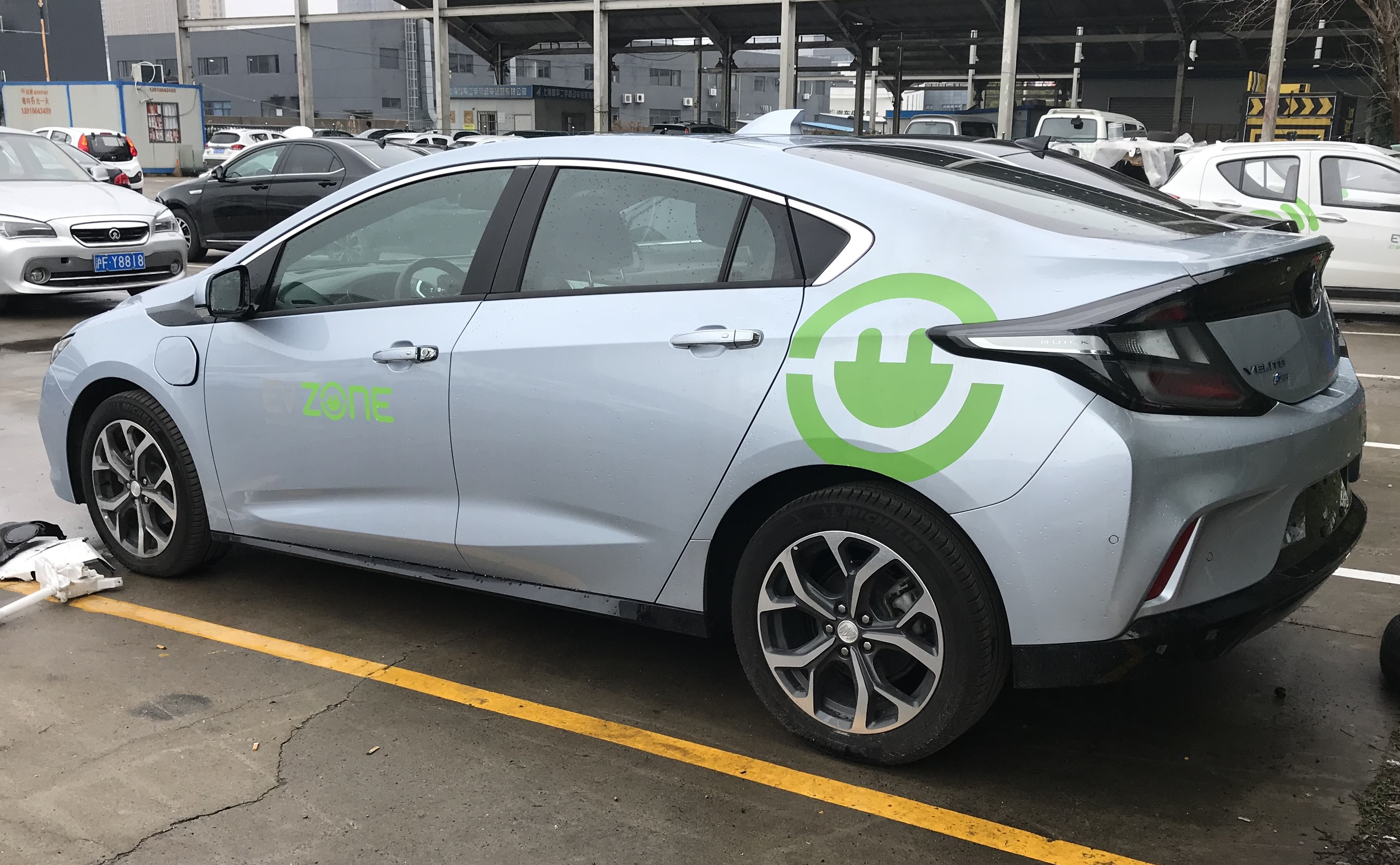
Buick Velite 5 rear

New for the 2018 model year was an LT Driver Confidence Package, including Rear Park Assist, Rear Cross-Traffic Alert, and Side Blind Zone Alert. For the final 2019 US model year, Chevrolet added several new features, including a 7.2 kW charging system, Chevrolet Infotainment 3 system with 8-inch-diagonal color touchscreen, and a digital rear-view camera. Options were added to defer the automatic engine-assisted heating system for more all-electric operation, and configure Low and Regen-On-Demand profiles to increase regenerative braking capabilities.

GM ended Volt production on March 1, 2019, to coincide with the closure of its Detroit/Hamtramck Assembly plant. The Detroit-Hamtramck plant also built the Chevrolet Impala, Buick LaCrosse, and Cadillac CT6. Production of the Volt ended February 15, 2019.

== Reception ==
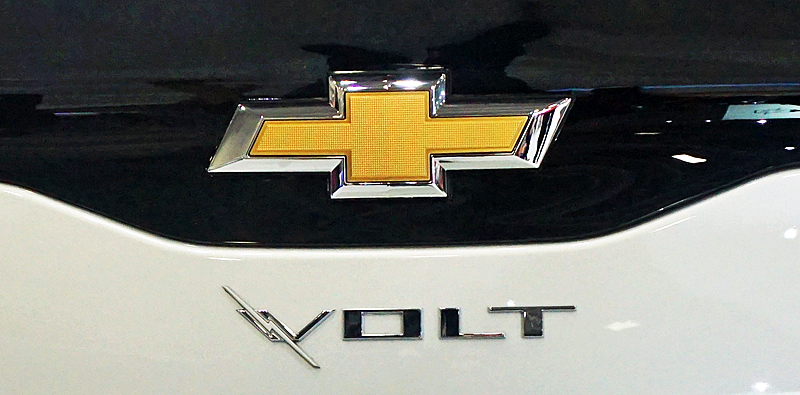
Second generation Chevrolet Volt badge

Car and Driver magazine praised the shape, longer EV range, addition of a regenerative paddle, efficiency and big trunk. Points of criticism were the loss its distinctive styling, rear middle seat leg room, its MSRP, front seat comfort, small back seats and cornering imbalance. Overall, Car and Driver thought the Volt has been brought to the next level. The second-generation Volt was awarded the "2016 Green Car of the Year" by Green Car Journal at the 2016 LA Auto Show. The Volt became the first model to receive this award more than once.

The second generation Volt scored a "Top Safety Pick+" rating by the Insurance Institute for Highway Safety (IIHS). The plug-in hybrid scored a "Good" rating in all of the IIHS crash worthiness tests. The second-generation Volt was named one of the top ten tech cars in 2016 by IEEE Spectrum.

== See also ==
- Cadillac ELR
- Chevrolet Bolt
- Chevrolet Spark EV
- General Motors EV1
- Government incentives for plug-in electric vehicles
- List of modern production plug-in electric vehicles
- Plug-in electric vehicle
