= Cadillac Provoq =

Concept car developed by Cadillac

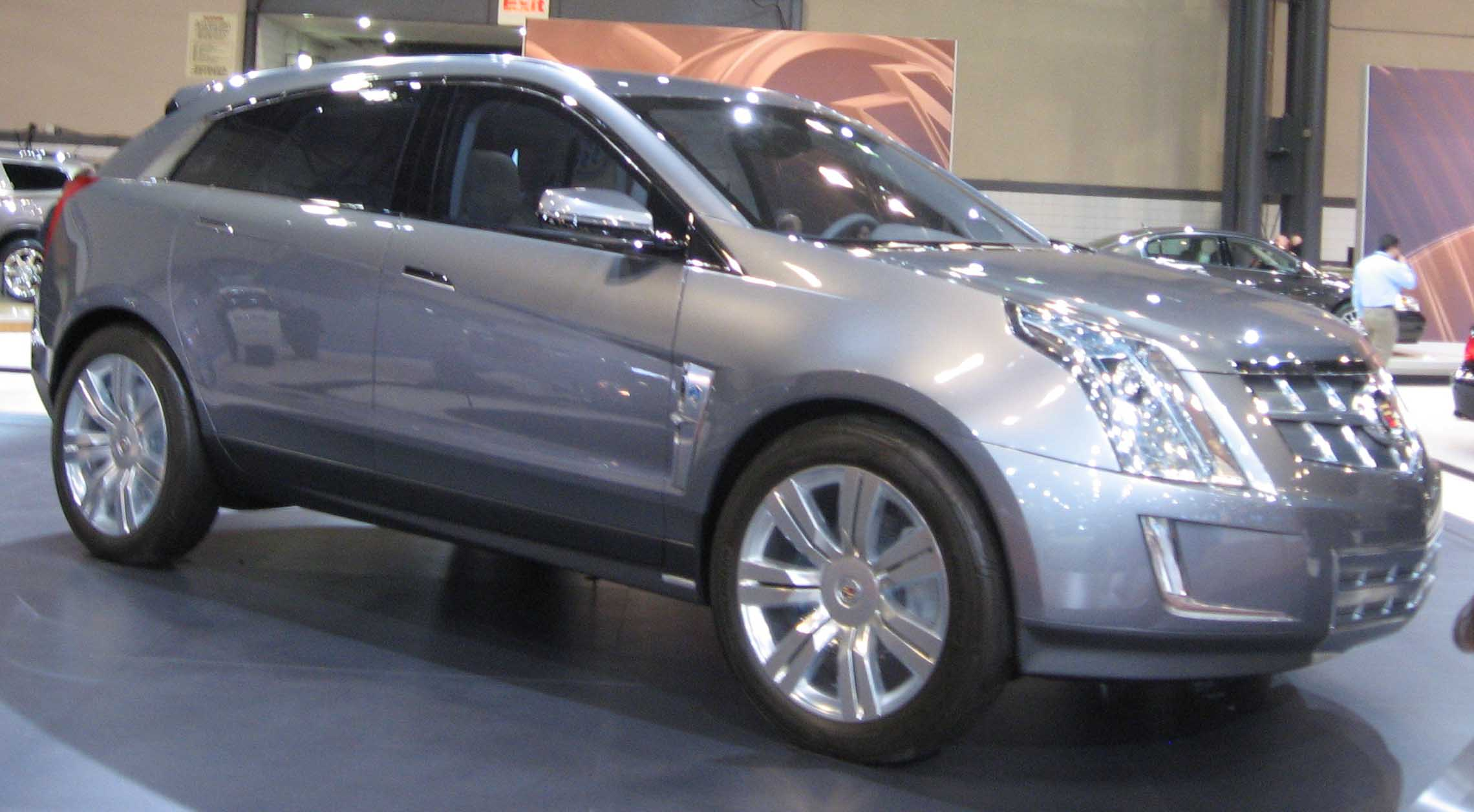

Overview
- Manufacturer: Cadillac (General Motors)
- Production: 2007–2008
- Designer: Hoon Kim

Body and chassis
- Class: Concept car
- Body style: 4-door SUV
- Layout: Front engine, front-wheel drive / four-wheel drive
- Platform: GM E-Flex platform

Powertrain
- Engine: 88 kWh fuel cell
- Electric motor: Front: 70 kWh; Rear: 40 kWh
- Battery: 9 kWh lithium-ion
- Range: 482 km (300 miles)

Dimensions
- Wheelbase: 114.4 in (2,906 mm)
- Length: 180.3 in (4,580 mm)
- Width: 72.8 in (1,849 mm)
- Height: 67.0 in (1,702 mm)

The Cadillac Provoq (pronounced as "provoke") was a concept luxury crossover SUV presented by GM at the 2008 Consumer Electronics Show in Las Vegas, Nevada on January 8, 2008. It was powered by the plug-in hybrid technology first shown in the Chevrolet Volt. For extended range, a hydrogen fuel cell could recharge the Lithium-ion battery and a solar panel could power onboard accessories, such as interior lighting and the audio system. As the Provoq concept used a hybrid powertrain it was based on the same GM Voltec platform as the Chevrolet Volt.

The production car shared the GM Theta platform with the Saab 9-4X. The production-spec Provoq was intended to be a replacement for the SRX, named BRX, but Cadillac retained the SRX nameplate for the new vehicle.
