= Ford Focus Electric =

5-door hatchback electric car produced by Ford

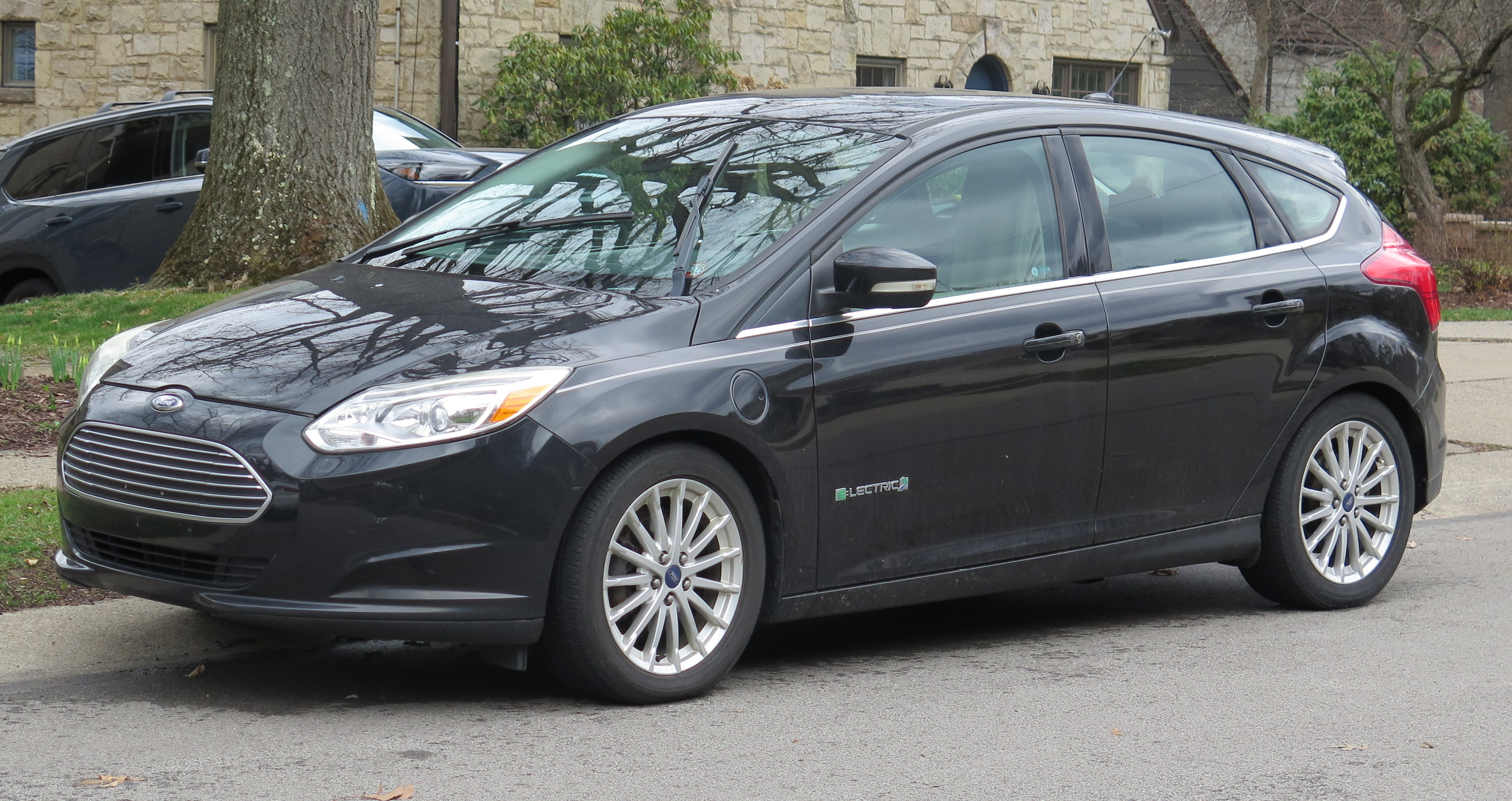
- 2012 Ford Focus Electric

Overview
- Manufacturer: Ford
- Production: December 2011 – May 2018
- Assembly: Michigan Assembly Plant, Wayne, Michigan; Saarlouis, Germany

Body and chassis
- Class: Compact car (C)
- Body style: 5-door hatchback

Powertrain
- Electric motor: 143 hp (107 kW) synchronous motor
- Transmission: 1-speed automatic
- Battery: 23 or 33.5 kWh lithium-ion battery
- Range: 76 mi (122 km) or 115 mi (185 km) (EPA)
- Plug-in charging: 6.6 kW onboard charger on SAE-J1772-2009 inlet DC Fast Charging with CCS

Dimensions
- Wheelbase: 104.3 in (2,649 mm)
- Length: 172.9 in (4,392 mm)
- Width: 71.8 in (1,824 mm)
- Height: 58.2 in (1,478 mm)
- Curb weight: 3,640 lb (1,651 kg)

The Ford Focus Electric is a 5-door hatchback electric car that was produced by Ford. The Focus Electric is Ford's third production all-electric vehicle (after the Ford TH!NK and Ford Ranger EV) and was made from December 2011 to May 2018.

The Focus Electric uses the same body (or glider) as the gasoline powered third generation Ford Focus. On introduction in 2011 it had a 23 kWh liquid-cooled lithium-ion battery pack, which delivered a range of 76 mi (122 km) according to the United States Environmental Protection Agency. For the 2017 model this was upgraded to a 33.5 kWh liquid-cooled lithium-ion battery pack which delivers a range of 115 mi (185 km) according to the United States Environmental Protection Agency. The agency rated the Focus Electric combined fuel economy at 105 miles per gallon gasoline equivalent (2.2 L/100 km) for the original model and 107 miles per gallon gasoline equivalent (2.2 L/100 km) for the 2017 model, and ranked the Focus Electric as the most fuel-efficient car sold in the United States in the compact class at the time. The Focus Electric was awarded the 2011 Green Car Vision Award at the 2011 Washington Auto Show.

== History ==
The Ford Focus BEV was the concept electric car introduced by Ford Motor Company at the 2009 Frankfurt Motor Show. The Focus BEV concept used the European Mark II as its donor vehicle and incorporated key components from Ford's North American hybrid technology, including the electric climate control system from the 2010 Ford Fusion Hybrid.

The Focus electric pre-production car was unveiled at the 2011 Consumer Electronics Show under the new name of Ford Focus Electric, and this pre-production version was based on the Focus Mark III.

Deliveries for fleet customers in the United States began in December 2011, and it was released to retail customers in May 2012 only in California, New York and New Jersey, in limited numbers, followed by the other 16 initial markets in the third quarter of 2012. The European release was initially slated for late 2012, but was rescheduled to start deliveries in August 2013. Unlike some smaller volume electric vehicles marketed only in California or other markets where mandated, the Focus Electric was sold in all 50 US states.

Production of the Focus Electric ran throughout the cycle of the third generation standard internal combustion model in the US. Both concluded in May 2018.

=== U.K. demonstration program ===
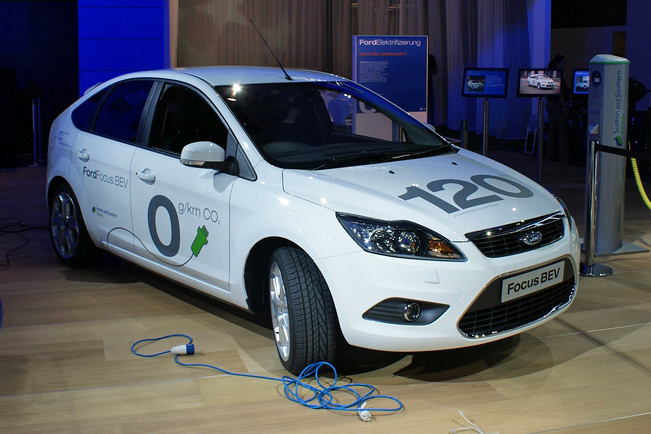
Ford Focus BEV concept car exhibited at the 2009 Frankfurt Motor Show.

The concept car unveiled at the 2009 Frankfurt Motor Show was developed to participate in the UK Government's "Ultra-Low Carbon Vehicles" demonstration initiative in early 2010. A consortium of Ford, Scottish and Southern Energy and University of Strathclyde used a fleet of 15 Ford Focus BEVs and a charging infrastructure in and around the London Borough of Hillingdon from early 2010. This new BEV demonstration fleet was developed partly with public funding from the UK Government's Technology Strategy Board (TSB) which promoted innovative industry-led projects to reduce CO_{2}.

== Specifications ==
=== Powertrain and battery ===
The Focus Electric shares Ford's global C-car platform and is built using the body (or glider) of the third generation Ford Focus. The electric car is powered by an electric motor rated at 107 kW, 245 Nm (143 hp, 181 ft-lbs), and uses a 23 kWh (75Ah) capacity LG Chem lithium-ion battery pack consisting of 430 cells arranged in 86 series 5 parallel (86S5P). The nominal cell voltage is 3.7 V with a 4.2/3.0 V maximum / minimum voltage, giving a nominal battery voltage of 318.2 V with a 361.2/258 V maximum/minimum, with a weight of 667 lbs. It is split in two with one part being under the rear seats and the other behind the rear seats. Pack capacity was upgraded to 33.5 kWh capacity lithium-ion battery pack in the 2017 model. Ford indicated that a battery of an all-electric vehicle similar to that of the Focus Electric weighs around 600 to 700 pounds and costs about US$12,000 to US$15,000, or between US$522 and US$650 a kilowatt-hour. Researchers estimate that the production of the battery emits 140 kg CO_{2} per kWh of capacity. The Focus Electric has a top speed of 84 mph (135 km/h).

Based on its five-cycle testing, the United States Environmental Protection Agency rated the Focus Electric combined fuel economy equivalent at 105 MPGe (2.2 L/100 km), with an equivalent 110 MPGe (2.1 L/100 km) in city driving and 99 MPGe (2.4 L/100 km) on highways. The agency rated the 2017 Focus Electric combined fuel economy at 107 miles per gallon gasoline equivalent (2.2 L/100 km), with an equivalent 118 MPGe (2.0 L/100 km) in city driving and 96 MPGe (2.5 L/100 km) on highways. The Focus Electric's EPA certified all-electric range is 76 mi (122 km) and the 2017 model's EPA certified range is 115 mi (185 km).

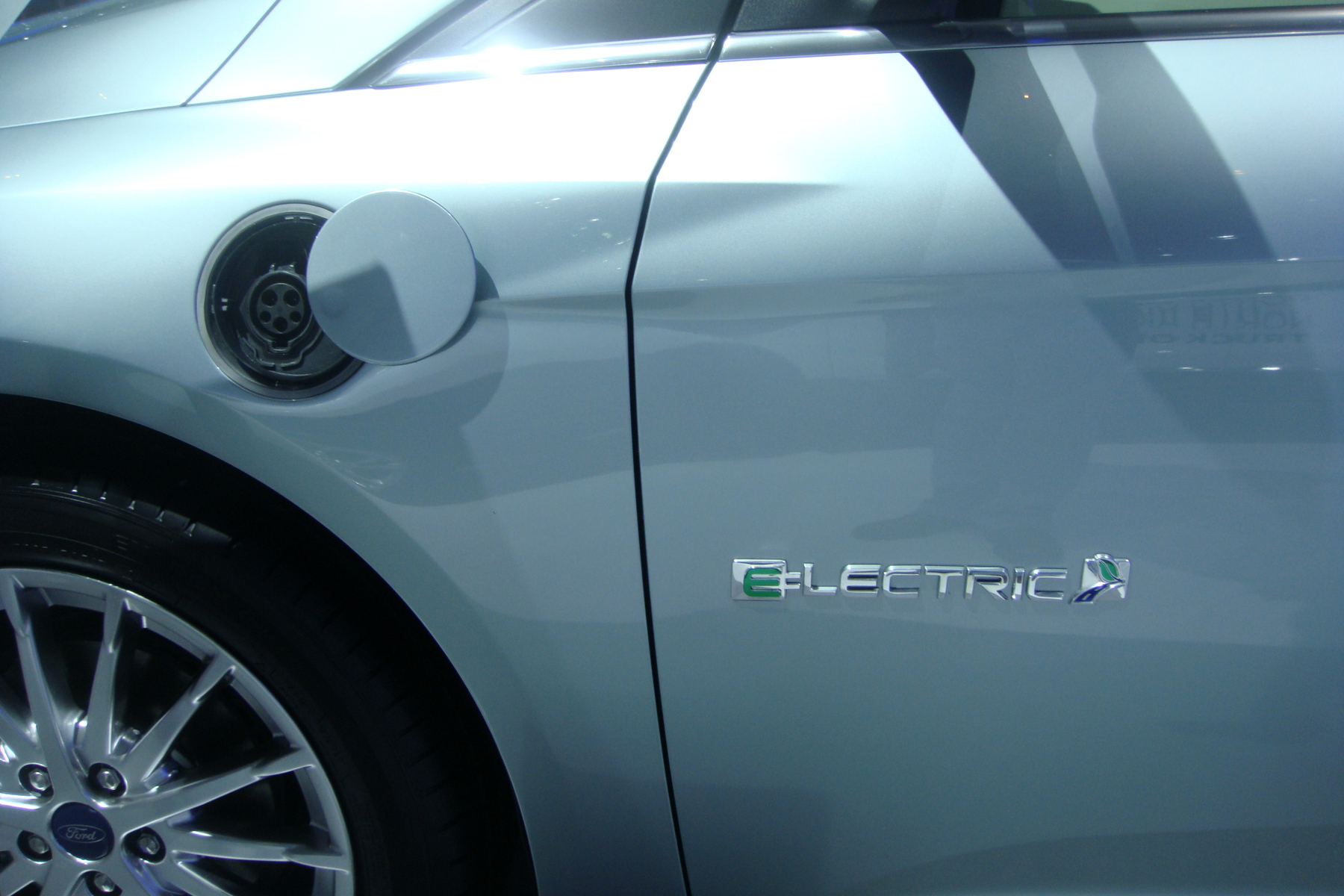
The charging port in the production version is located on the left front fender

Ford used a complete electric drive train developed and supplied by Magna International, and the advanced lithium-ion battery system is being engineered by Ford in cooperation with supplier Compact Power, Inc., a subsidiary of LG Chem. A full recharge using the car's 6.6 kW charger takes 3–4 hours for the original model and 5.5 hours for the 2017 model using a SAE J1772-2009 charging station powered from a standard 240 volt socket. A 120-volt convenience cord is also included allowing recharging from North American standard 120-volt outlets which could take up to 20 hours for the original model and 30 hours for the 2017 model. Ford added a fast charging option to the 2017 model, using a Combined Charging System connector to provide DC charging at up to 50 kW.

The advanced battery system uses an active liquid cooling and heating thermal management system to precondition and regulate the temperature in the battery system. This feature helps to maximize battery life and driving range. The active liquid system heats or chills a coolant before pumping it through the battery cooling system. This loop regulates temperature throughout the system against external conditions. On a hot day the cooled liquid absorbs heat from the battery pack, dispersing it through a radiator before pumping it through the chiller again. On a cold day the heated liquid warms the batteries, gradually bringing the system's temperature to a level that allows it to efficiently accept charge energy and provide enough discharge power for expected vehicle performance.

Ford conducted research to define the optimal location of the charge port for the Focus Electric and the Ford C-Max Energi plug-in hybrid. The carmaker decided to locate the port in the left front fender as such location is more convenient for home charging, which Ford found is what most customers would do. Also the side location avoids areas with high risk of damage in the event of small crashes. Ford says this fact was a driving factor in the choice of the side location rather than the rear or the front.

=== Connectivity and other features ===
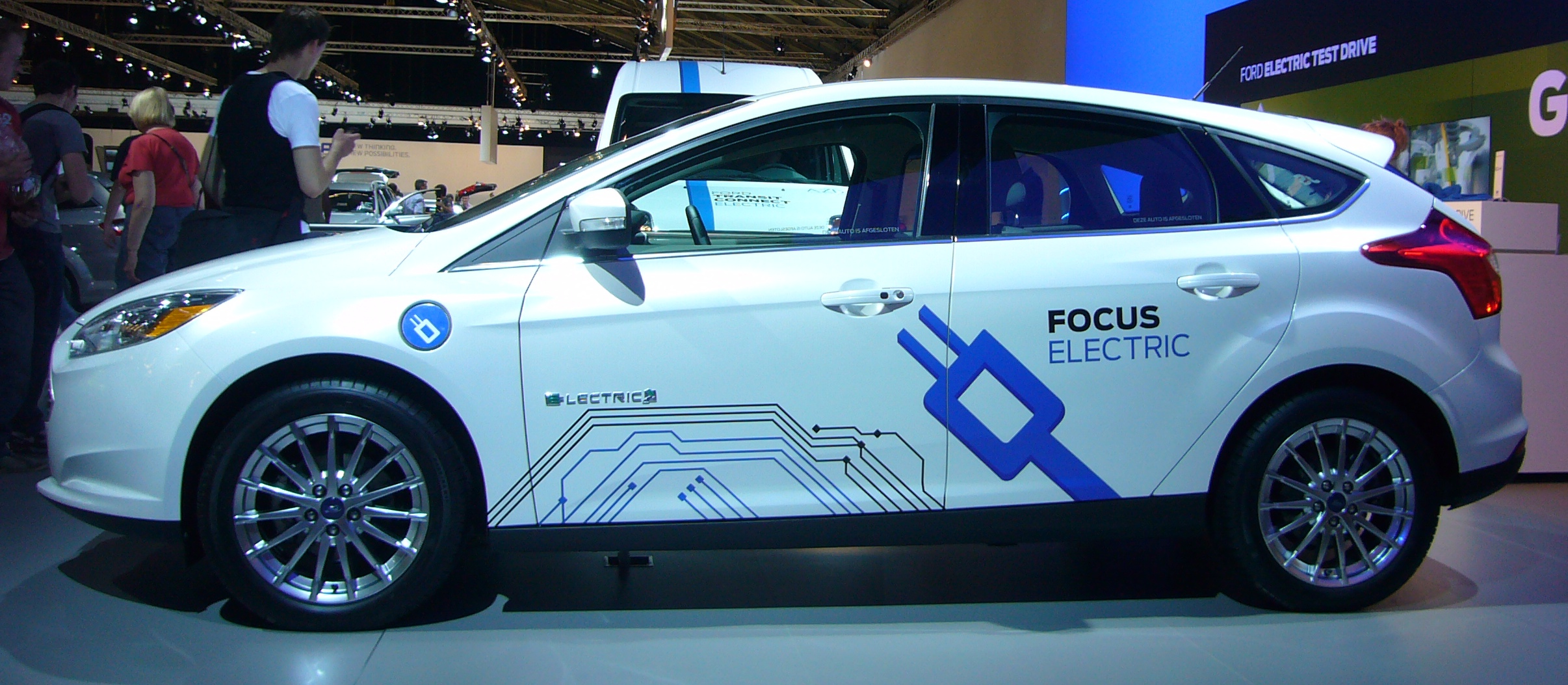
Lateral view of the 2012 Ford Focus Electric

The Ford Focus Electric introduced new features and a high level of technological connectivity including a unique version of the MyFord Touch driver connect system adapted for electric vehicles, a new value charging feature powered by Microsoft and a smartphone application called MyFord Mobile that owners can use to control and charge their vehicles remotely.

The specialized version of the MyFord Touch technology for the Focus Electric offers additional vehicle information, such as battery state of charge, distance to charge points, range budget and expected range margin. The system's MyView feature allows drivers to access even more vehicle data including the electrical demands of vehicle accessories such as air conditioning, which can impact driving range. This feature can be used to plan multiple-stop journeys within the car's range and to locate charging stations. The improved MyFord Touch system will also allow drivers to customize the display on a case-by-case basis according to the owners daily, weekly or monthly driving needs.

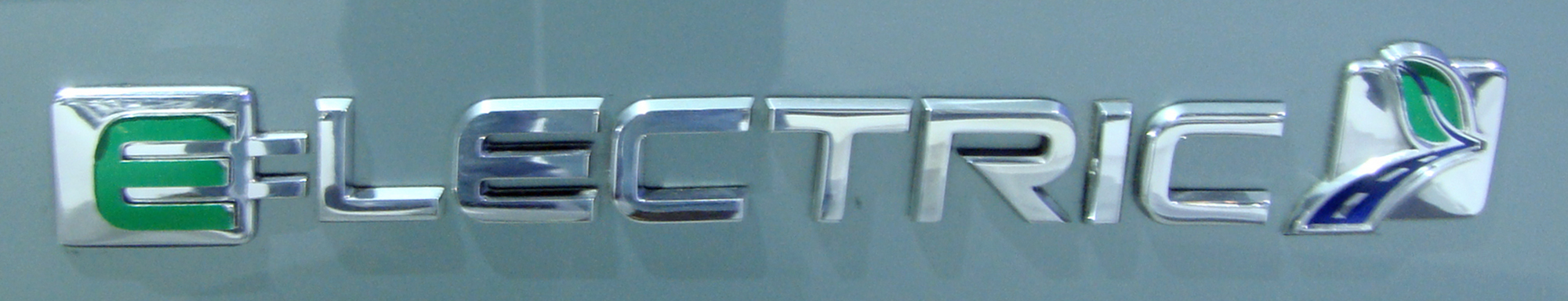
Ford's leaf road logo badge for the Focus electric car

Inspired in the Ford Fusion Hybrid growing green leaves of first-generation SmartGauge with EcoGuide, the Focus Electric cluster display uses blue butterflies to represent the surplus range beyond the drivers' charge point destination, as more butterflies are shown the greater the range is, and the blue butterflies gradually disappear as the car's battery is depleted. Ford says the designers were inspired by the butterfly effect, a phenomenon in which a small change, such as choosing to drive an electric vehicle, can have an enormous impact. At the end of each trip a display screen provides distance driven, miles gained through regenerative braking, energy consumed and a comparative gasoline savings achieved by driving electric.

The display cluster is integrated with the MyFord Touch map-based Navigation System using the car's center stack 8-inch touch screen. After the driver adds destinations, including their next charge point, into the Navigation System, the system provides coaching advice about driver behaviors such as optimizing regenerative braking and accelerating without drawing too much energy; or on how to achieve the desired range, or if travel plans need to be adjusted. The on-board Navigation System provides an EcoRoute option based on characteristics of efficient EV driving.

The 2012 Focus Electric was planned to include warning sounds to alert pedestrians of its presence when the electric car was running at low speeds. Ford developed four alternative sounds, and in June 2011 involved the car fans by asking them to pick their favorite from the four potential warning sounds through the Focus Electric Facebook page. However, ultimately Ford decided to hold off including warning sounds unless federal legislation required it, and no such system was implemented on the production vehicle.

== Production ==
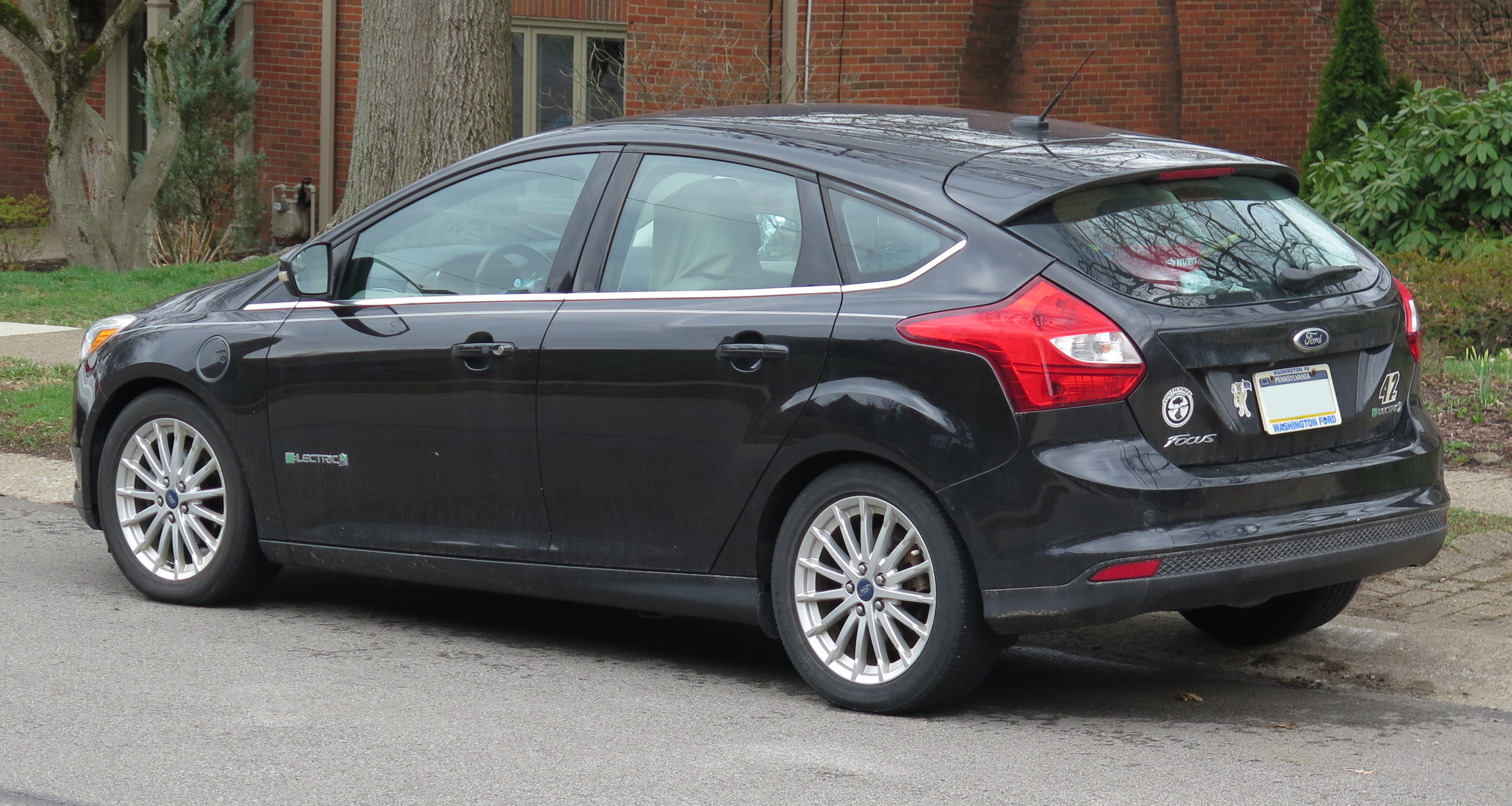
Rear view

Production began in December 2011. The Focus Electric was being built at the Michigan Assembly Plant in Wayne, Michigan on the same line as the gasoline-powered version of the Focus, the C-Max Energi plug-in hybrid and the C-Max Hybrid. Ford stated that initial production was limited but was ramped up in 2012. North American Ford Focus production ended in May 2018. The platform was designed for piston engines, and the battery took up space in the boot; the battery and electric motor was squeezed into a car not designed for it.

Ford began production of the Focus Electric destined for the European market in Saarlouis, Germany in June 2013. Deliveries to European customers were scheduled to begin in August 2013.

Production of the Focus Electric for both US and European markets concluded in May 2018.

== Markets and sales ==
=== United States ===
Because initial production of the 2012 model year is limited, the Focus Electric was available initially only in 19 metropolitan areas including Atlanta, Houston and Austin, Texas, Boston, Chicago, Denver, Detroit, Los Angeles, San Francisco, San Diego, New York City, Orlando, Florida, Phoenix and Tucson, Arizona, Portland, Oregon, Raleigh-Durham, Richmond, Virginia, Seattle, and Washington, D.C. Deliveries for fleet customers began in December 2011 and to retail customers in May 2012. The first production vehicle was delivered to Google in December 2011 and was incorporated in the company's GFleet carsharing corporate service. Initially sales were limited to California, New York and New Jersey. Ford has scheduled the launch in other selected markets in the third quarter of 2012. A total of 685 units were sold in 2012, and 1,738 in 2013. As of September 2014, cumulative sales in the American market reached 3,965 units.

Ford began taking online orders on November 2, 2011, with pricing starting at US$39,995, including a US$795 destination charge, but before the US$7,500 US federal tax credit, along with other state and local incentives available for eligible buyers of plug-in electric vehicles. The 2012 Focus Electric is eligible in California to a US$2,500 rebate through the state's Clean Vehicle Rebate Project (CVRP), and also was granted free access to California's high-occupancy vehicle lanes (HOV) for solo drivers.

In 2012, the Focus Electric was priced significantly higher than a conventional gas-powered Focus, which, as of December 2011 listed a base price of US$16,500, rising to US$30,692 when fully loaded with all available options. Thus, after accounting for all available government incentives, in some locations the Focus Electric may be net-priced similar to a fully loaded gas version. When compared to other plug-in electric vehicles available in the U.S., the Focus Electric had essentially the same price as the 2012 Chevrolet Volt plug-in hybrid, and it costs US$3,945 more than the base-model 2012 Nissan Leaf SV. Available options in 2012 included leather-trimmed seats and two special paint options, blue candy and white platinum.

In 2013 it was announced that the 2014 Ford Focus Electric model would have a US$4,000 price reduction in its MSRP, which brought the base price down to US$35,200 MSRP. Due to decreasing pricing by competitors, as of February 2014 Ford offered an additional dealer incentive of US$6,000 off the Focus Electric bringing down the base price down to US$29,200 before tax incentives. In October 2014, Ford made the lower price more permanent by reducing the MSRP by $6,000 for both the remaining 2014 models as well as 2015 models bringing the starting price down to US$29,995, and replacing the temporary $6,000 dealer incentives offered in February 2014.

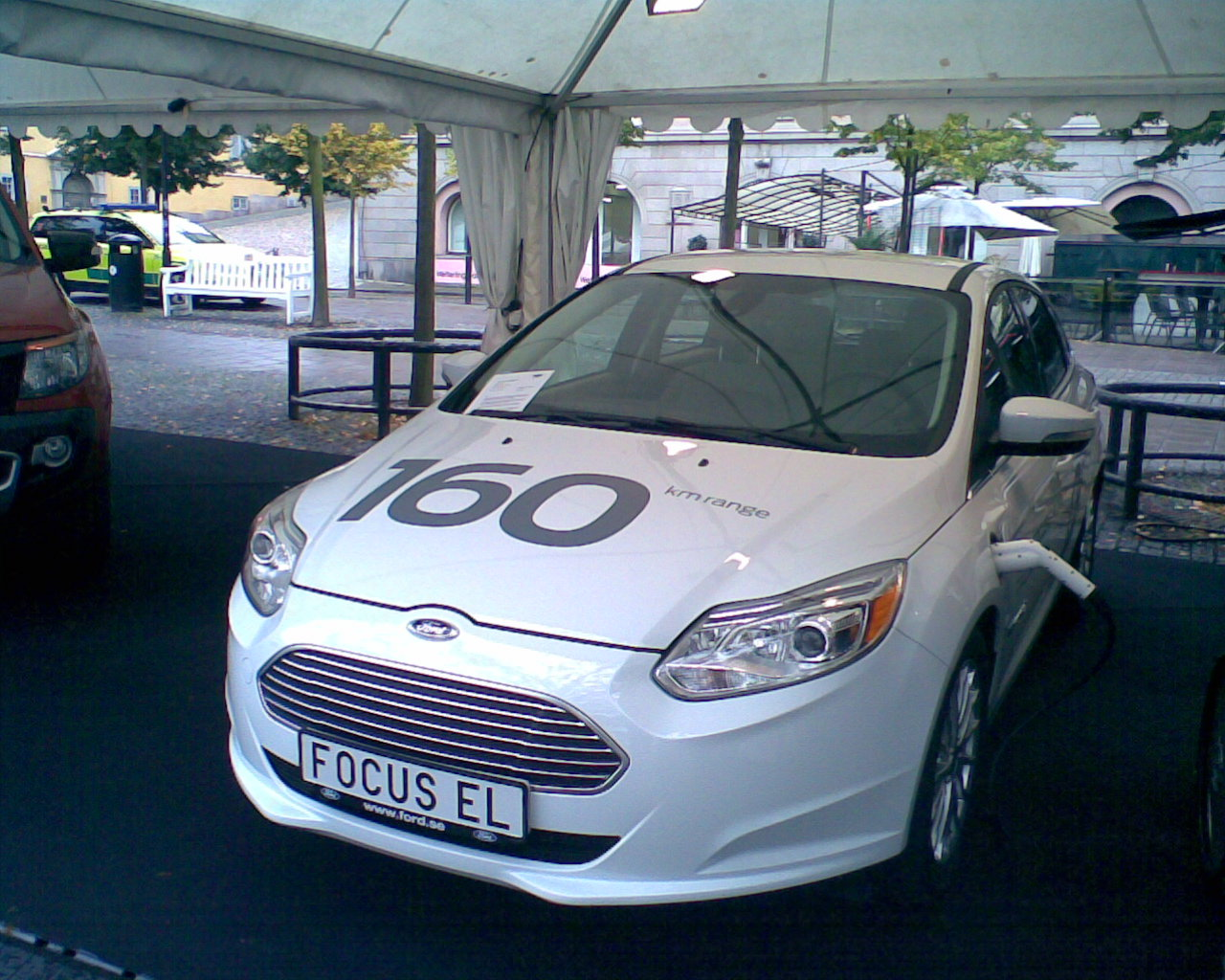
Ford Focus Electric at a car festival in Sweden with a claimed range of 160 km (99 miles).

In 2011, through an association with SunPower, an optional solar-panel system was to be offered by some Ford dealers to be installed on the homes of Focus Electric owners to generate enough renewable energy during the day to offset the electricity used to charge the vehicle at night. The SunPower's home solar charging option cost US$10,000 before the then available local and federal tax credits. Ford also made an agreement with Best Buy in 2011 to offer a 240-volt home charging station.

==== Annual sales ====
Calendar year	US sales
2011	8
2012	685
2013	1,738
2014	1,964
2015	1,582
2016	872
2017	1,817
2018	560

=== Europe ===
The European launch was initially scheduled for late 2012. Although pricing was not announced, Ford stated that, unlike Renault that will offer a battery-leasing option on its electric vehicles sold in Europe, the Focus Electric will be sold with the battery pack included in the price of the electric car. Deliveries were rescheduled to start in August 2013.

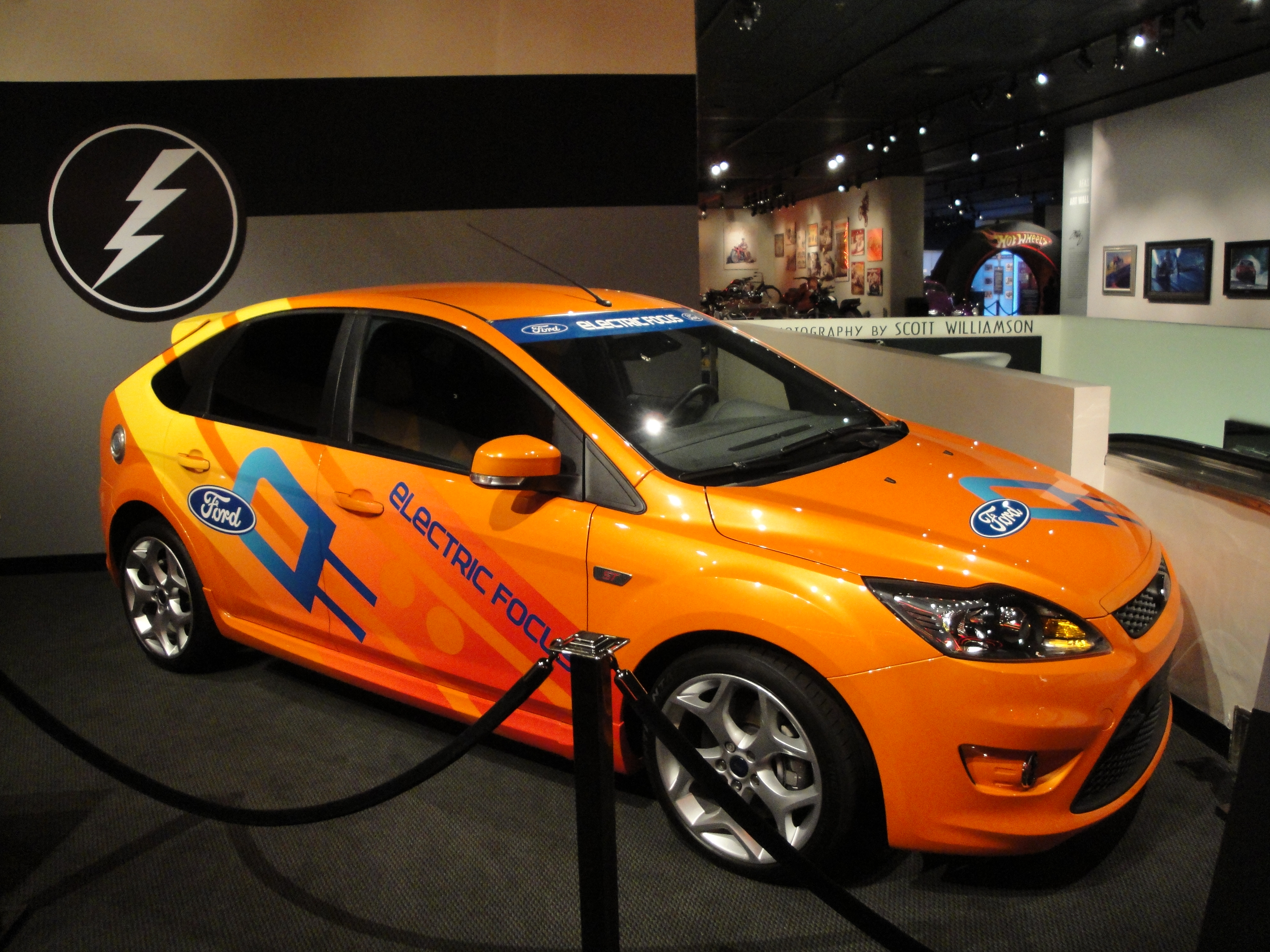
Demonstration Focus BEV similar to the one featured on The Jay Leno Show.

== Marketing ==
As a publicity stunt, a Focus BEV was featured on The Jay Leno Show in September 2009. Celebrity guests drove a purpose-built car with the shell from a European market Ford Focus and a test prototype version of electrical powertrain in a segment called "Green Car Challenge".

== Recognition ==
The Ford Focus Electric was awarded the 2011 Green Car Vision Award at the 2011 Washington Auto Show. The 2012 Focus Electric was selected among the five finalists for the 2012 Green Car of the Year awarded by the Green Car Journal in November 2011 at the Los Angeles Auto Show.

In March 2012, the U.S. EPA ranked the Focus Electric as the 2012 most fuel-efficient car sold in the United States in the compact class.

== See also ==
- Government incentives for plug-in electric vehicles
- List of electric cars currently available
- List of modern production plug-in electric vehicles
- Plug-in electric vehicle
