= Cadillac ELR =

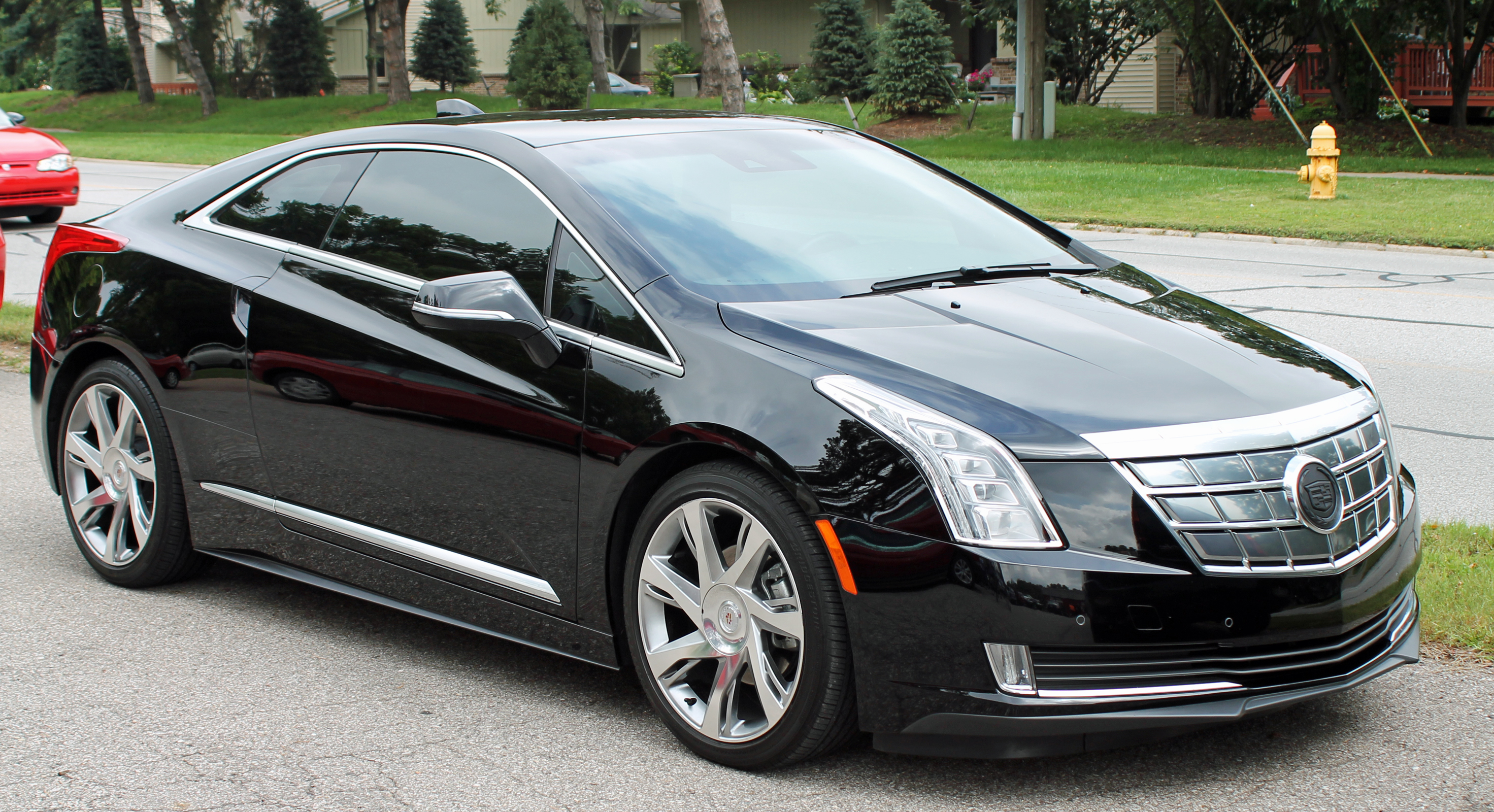
- 2014 Cadillac ELR

Overview
- Manufacturer: General Motors
- Production: 2013–2016; 2,958 produced
- Model years: 2014 and 2016
- Assembly: United States: Detroit, Michigan (Detroit/Hamtramck Assembly)
- Designer: Exterior: Tim Kozub; Interior: Keith Fisher

Body and chassis
- Class: Compact car
- Body style: 2-door coupé
- Layout: Transverse front-engine, front-wheel drive
- Platform: GM Delta II / GM Voltec
- Related: Chevrolet Volt/Holden Volt/Opel Ampera/Vauxhall Ampera

Powertrain
- Engine: 1398 cc EcoFLEX LUU I4 (gasoline)
- Transmission: CVT Voltec 4ET50 multi-mode electric transaxle
- Hybrid drivetrain: Series hybrid
- Battery: 16.5kwh (2014) – 17.1kwh (2016) kWh lithium-ion battery
- Range: 340 mi (550 km)(EPA)
- Electric range: (2014) 37 mi (60 km) (2016) 39 mi (63 km) (EPA)

Dimensions
- Wheelbase: 2,695 mm (106.1 in)
- Length: 4,724 mm (186.0 in)
- Width: 1,847 mm (72.7 in)
- Height: 1,420 mm (55.9 in)
- Curb weight: 1,846 kg (4,070 lb)

The Cadillac ELR is a two-door, four-passenger luxury plug-in hybrid compact coupé manufactured and marketed by Cadillac for model years (MY) 2014 and 2016 – with a hiatus for MY 2015. Using a retuned version of the Chevrolet Volt's Voltec EREV drivetrain, the ELR's lithium-ion battery pack delivered an all-electric range of 37–39 miles (60–63 km) and a top speed of 106 mph (171 km/h).

The ELR derived from Cadillac's Converj concept, which debuted at the 2009 North American International Auto Show. Scheduled for production and subsequently canceled during General Motors' bankruptcy and restructuring, and after a series of on-again, off-again decisions, the ELR was approved for production for MY 2014 with a MSRP at roughly $75,000 — $35,000 higher than the Volt, whose basic powertrain it shared.

Styled under the exterior design direction of Tim Kozub, Cadillac presented the production ELR at the 2013 North American International Auto Show with retail deliveries beginning in the United States and Canada in December 2013.

ELR manufacture ended in February 2016 with a total production just under 3,000.

== Development ==
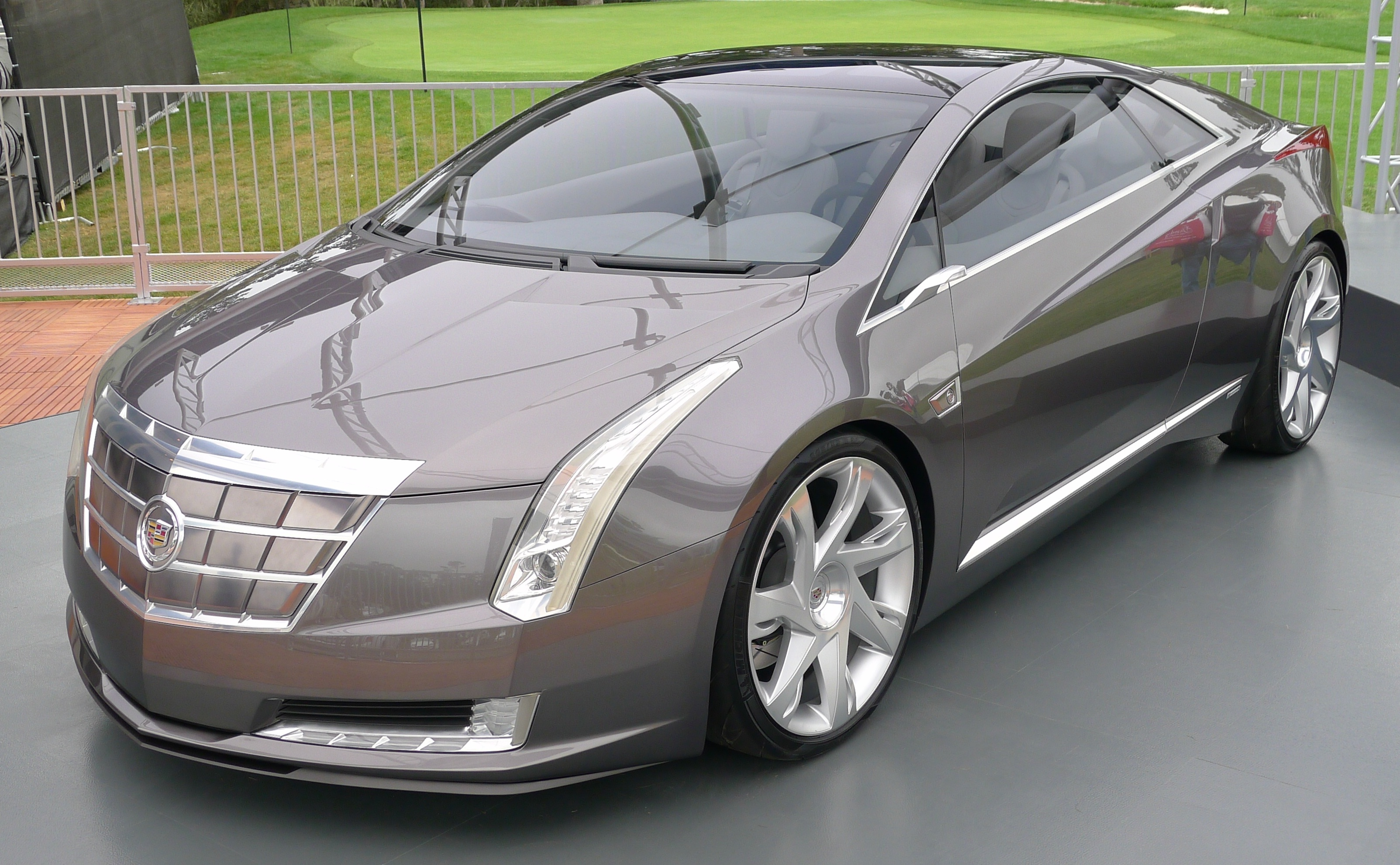
The Cadillac Converj concept debuted in January 2009 at the North American International Auto Show.

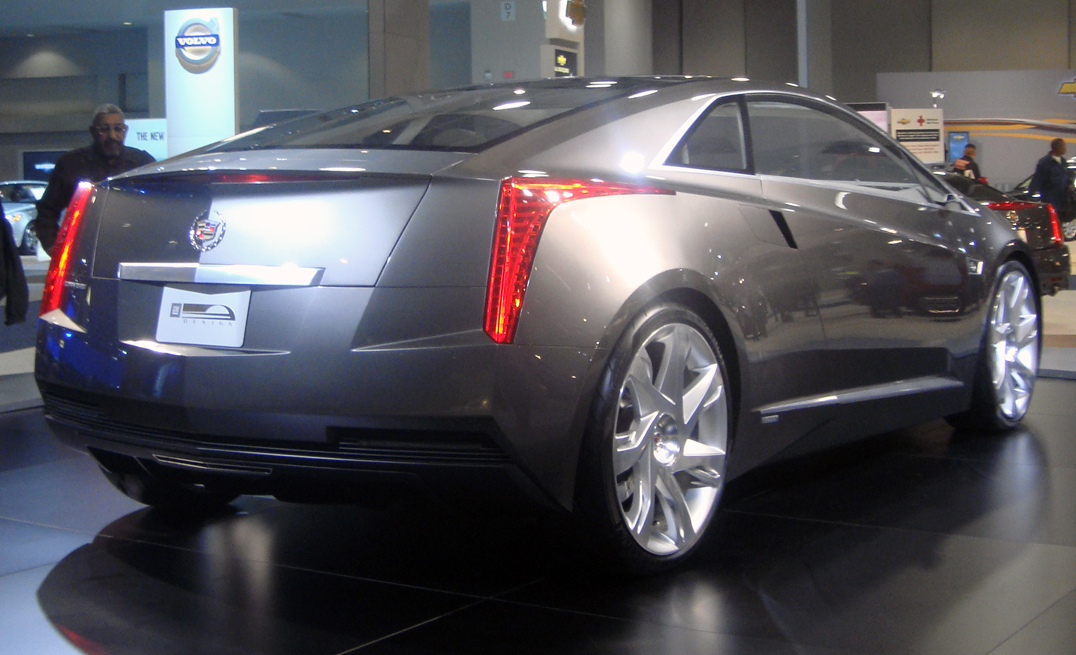
The Cadillac Converj concept viewed from the rear

General Motors debuted the Cadillac Converj concept, the car that would eventually become the 2014 Cadillac ELR, in January 2009, at the North American International Auto Show.

In April 2009, Motor Trend reported that GM approved the production version of Cadillac Converj in 2011 as a 2012 vehicle. GM refuted the report, saying that the Converj was "a concept vehicle undergoing a review". An August 2009 BusinessWeek report said GM vice chairman Robert Lutz wanted to see the Converj go into production, possibly as early as 2014. While delivering the keynote speech at the 46th annual Northwood Auto Show, Lutz reportedly "hinted that an announcement on production for the well-received Cadillac Converj concept car may be forthcoming." At the 2010 North American International Auto Show, Lutz told the Society of Automotive Analysts, "The Cadillac Converj is cleared for production," but that "It won't be next year or the year after that." Despite these statements, in March 2010, BusinessWeek reported that GM decided to end work on the Converj because the car "couldn't have enough amenities and electric range to be compelling to buyers and produce a profit".

In August 2011, General Motors reversed its decision to cancel the project and announced the Converj concept would go into production as the Cadillac ELR, at a price less than the US$57,400 Tesla Model S, but did not provide details on performance or timing. GM said the ELR would be about the same size as the Chevrolet Volt and would be produced at the same facility. Within the framework of GM's vehicle electrification strategy, the Cadillac ELR was—after the Chevrolet Volt EREV and Spark EV—the third plug-in electric passenger car sold by General Motors in the U.S. since the EV1 was discontinued. In contrast to pure battery EV proponents like Tesla Motors, GM initially focused on extended-range EV technology that incorporates internal combustion engines.

General Motors began testing ELR prototypes in mid-2012. The production version was unveiled at the 2013 North American International Auto Show.

== Specifications ==
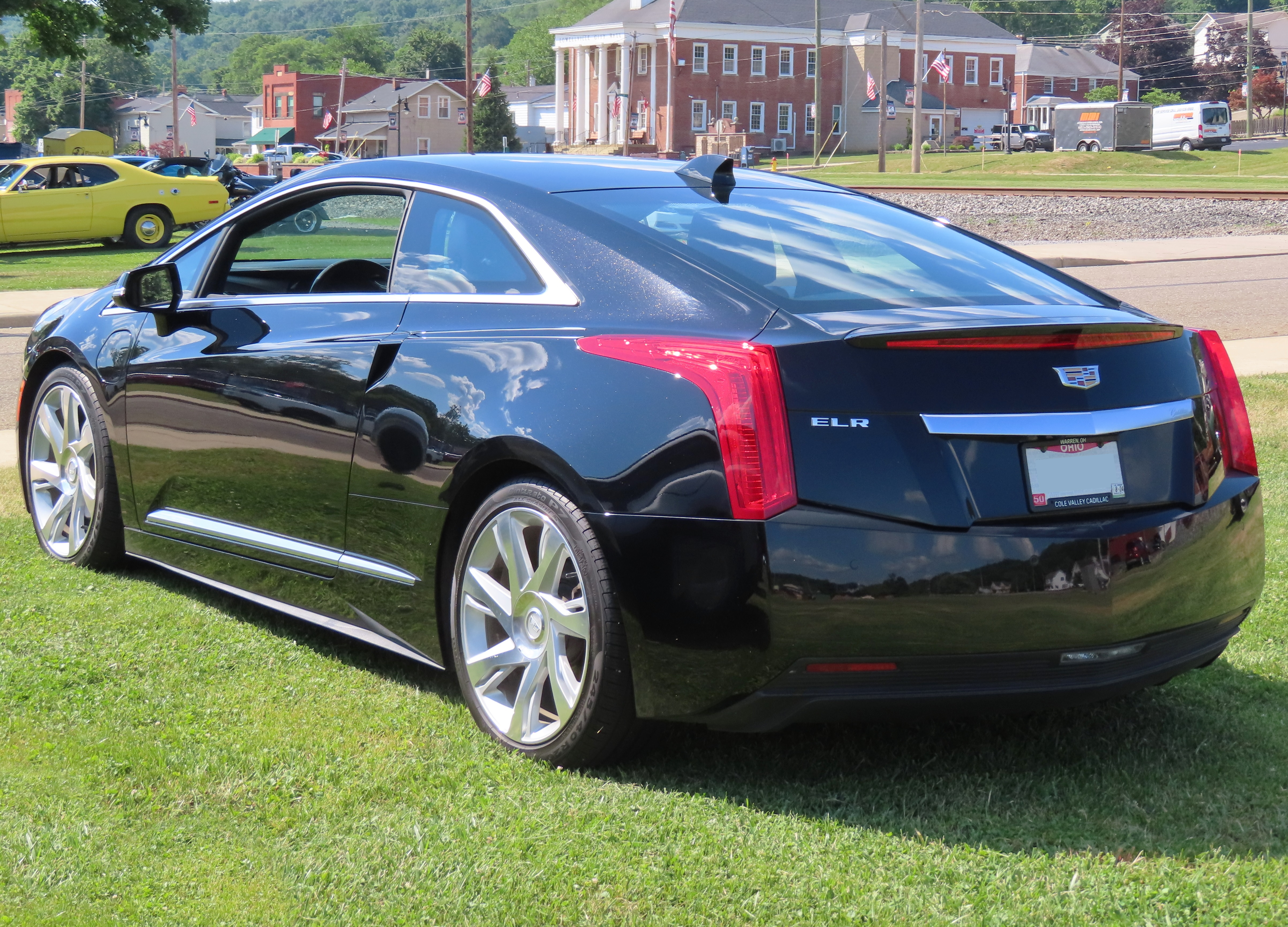
2016 Cadillac ELR rear

The ELR incorporates a version of the Voltec propulsion system used in the Chevrolet Volt. The Voltec propulsion system includes a 119–135-kilowatt electric motor, a four-cylinder engine-generator and a 16.5 kWh lithium-ion battery pack. The ELR has an official all-electric range of 37 miles (60 km) and a total range of 340 mi (550 km), as rated by the United States Environmental Protection Agency (EPA). Charging times are 12.5–18 hours using the 120-volt travel charger, and about five hours using a 240-volt charging station. Top speed is 106 mph (171 km/h) and accelerates from 0–60 mph (97 km/h) in 7.8 seconds in range extended mode. Regenerative braking is controlled by steering wheel-mounted paddles.

Features include LED lighting, active air shutters, automatic high/low-beam headlamps, Bose 10-speaker sound system with active noise cancellation, and hand-cut-and-sewn interior with leather seating and microfiber suede headliners. Optional features include a full speed-range adaptive cruise control, collision-imminent braking, side blind zone assist and rear cross-traffic warning. The base model has 16-way-adjustable seats, with an optional 20-way-adjustable system.

For the 2014 model year, the ELR was available in four exterior colors, radiant silver metallic, black raven, graphite metallic and extra-cost bi-coat crystal red — with a tri-coat white edition of 100 examples marketed through Saks Fifth Avenue — fully optioned with an upgraded 240-volt charging station (including installation) and concierge service. For 2016, the ELR was available in radiant silver, stellar black, graphite metallic, crystal white and red passion colors.

== 2016 model ==
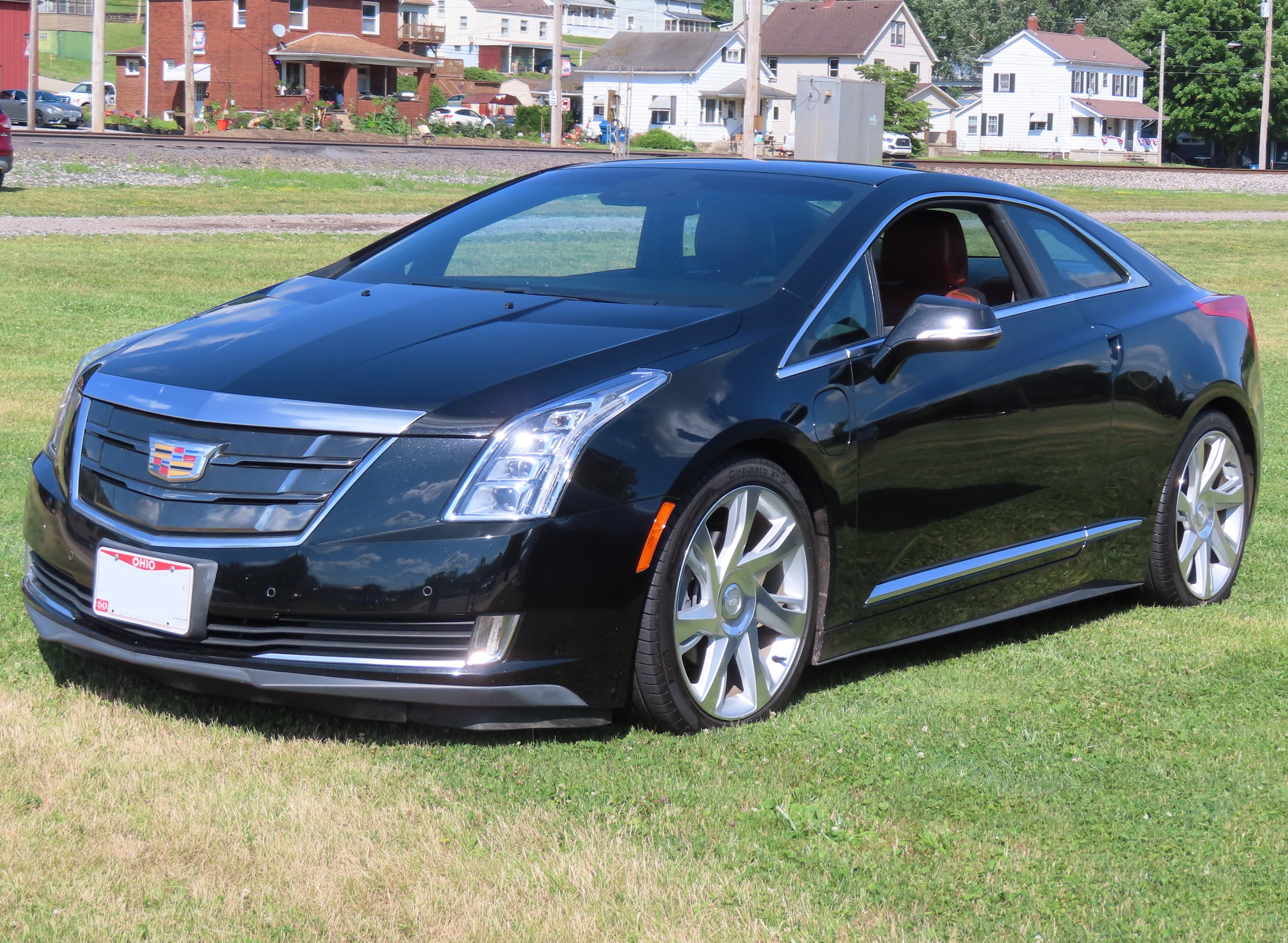
2016 Cadillac ELR

Skipping the 2015 model year, Cadillac decreased the ELR's MSRP by $10,000 for the 2016 model year, and raised total system horsepower, from its two electric motors and gasoline four-cylinder engine. Horsepower increased from 217 to 233, and peak torque increased from 295 lb-ft to 373 – reducing the zero-to-60 time by 1.5 seconds. The 2016 models featured revised torque-steer-mitigating strut technology with stiffer springs, stiffer control-arm bushings, and the addition of a damper rebound spring.

The rear twist-beam axle received stiffer bushings for its Watts linkage, and the adaptive suspension was retuned to match the increased stiffness and the recalibrated steering; brakes were also upgraded. An optional performance package reduces the ELR's electric-only driving range by about four miles, and includes summer-only performance tires, new 20-inch wheels, Brembo four-piston front brake calipers with 13.6-inch vented rotors, a sport steering wheel with a thicker rim, and unique steering and suspension revisions.

The 2016 ELR included previously optional blind-spot monitoring, rear cross-traffic alert, automatic high beams, and lane-change alert as well as a 4G LTE onboard data connection with Wi-Fi hotspot capability. The 2016 model also features Cadillac's revised, wreathless crest badge and a revised front "grille".

The engine management software was updated and the regenerative braking system reconfigured. The 2016 ELR delivered an all-electric range of 39 mi (63 km), up from 37 miles (60 km).

== Fuel economy ==
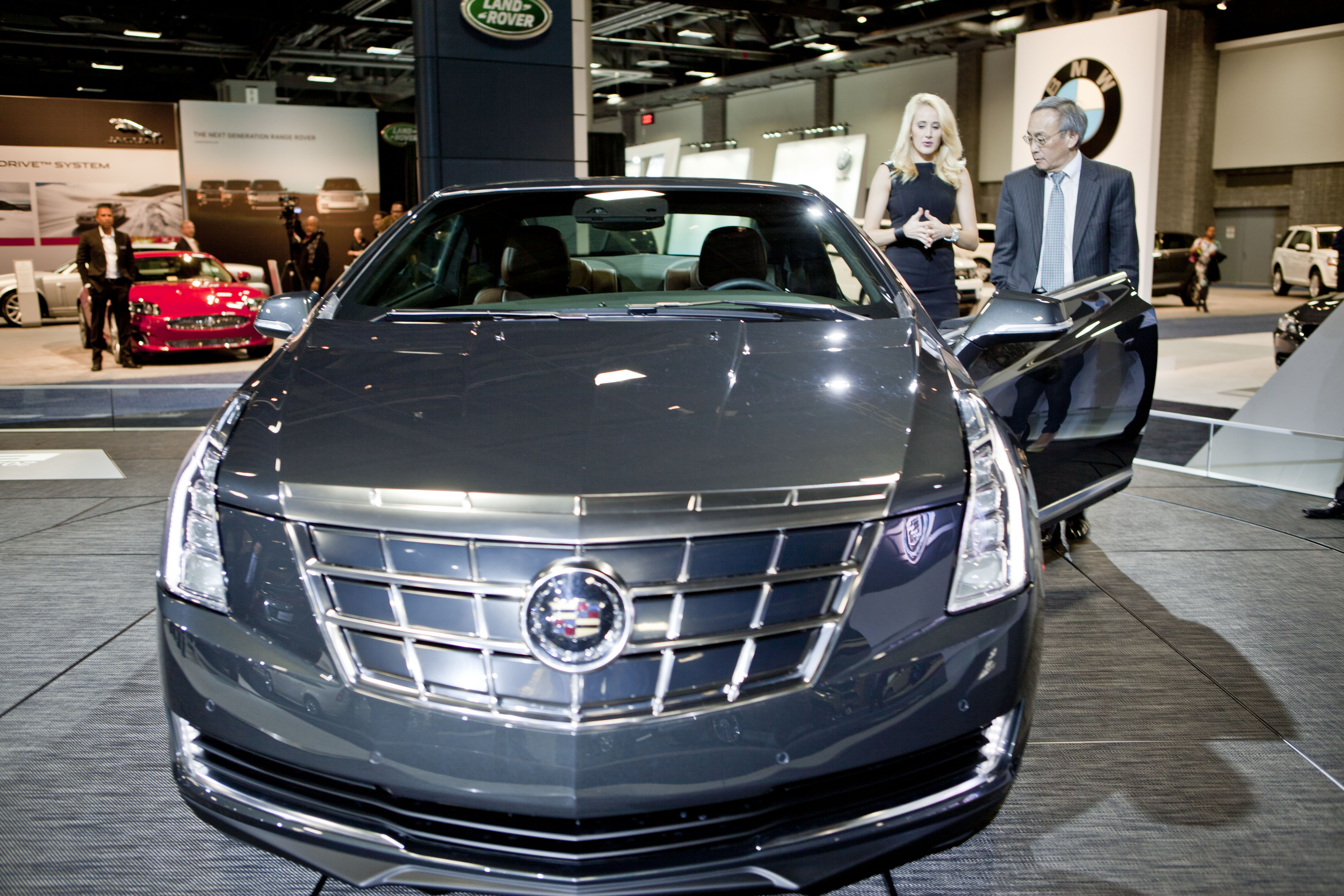
U.S. Department of Energy Secretary Steven Chu discusses the features of the 2014 Cadillac ELR exhibited at the 2013 Washington Auto Show.

The U.S. Environmental Protection Agency (EPA) officially rated the 2014 ELR's combined city/highway fuel economy in all-electric mode at 82 miles per gallon gasoline equivalent (MPG-e) (2.9 L gasoline equivalent/100 km; 98 mpg-imp gasoline equivalent). This rating considers a conversion factor of 33.7 kWh of electricity being the energy equivalent of a gallon of gasoline, and the ELR has an energy consumption rate of 41 kWh/100 mi for combined city/highway driving. The EPA rating in gasoline-only mode is 33 mpg_{‑US} (7.1 L/100 km; 40 mpg_{‑imp}) for combined driving. The 2014 Volt has a rating of 37 mpg_{‑US} (6.4 L/100 km; 44 mpg_{‑imp}) for gasoline-only mode and a fuel economy in all-electric mode of 98 MPG-e (2.4 L gasoline equivalent/100 km; 118 mpg-imp gasoline equivalent). The ELR has more power than the Volt, but is 300 lb (140 kg) heavier.

== Operating modes ==
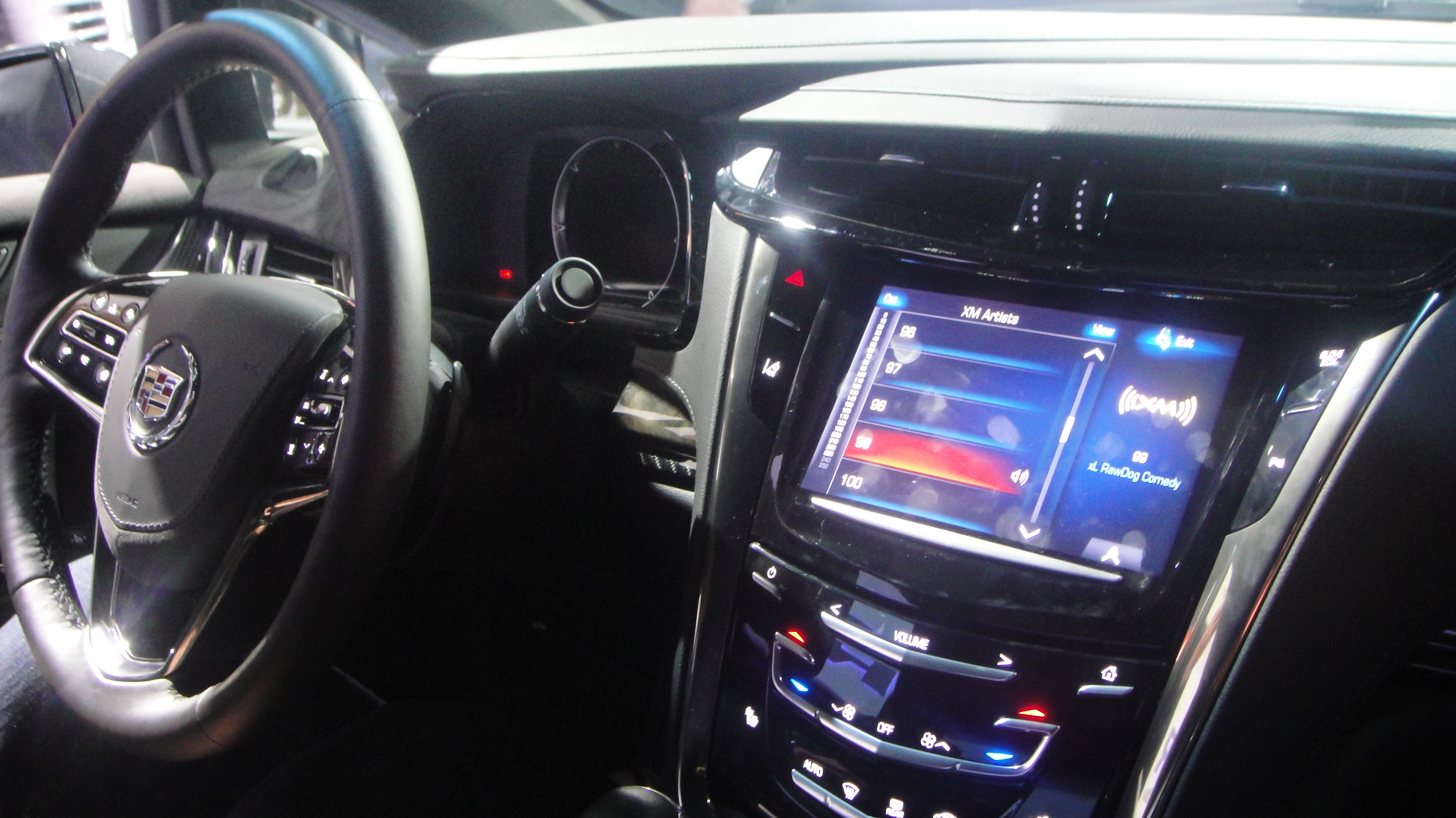
Interior

The ELR has a traditional shift lever (PRNDL) with a button on the console allowing selection of four driving modes: Tour, Hold, Mountain and Sport:

Tour mode, the default setting, lets the ELR operate in all-electric mode (EV mode) until its battery is fully discharged. This mode provides the maximum powertrain efficiency and a minimum level of vibration.

Hold mode allows the driver to save the energy currently stored in the battery for later use, such as traveling in urban areas.

Mountain mode was designed to provide more available battery power in mountainous environments by increasing minimum battery state of charge (SOC) in the battery. The car uses the gasoline-engine sooner, or runs it longer to build up the battery's state of charge, thus allowing the car to maintain performance on steep and long grades.

Sport mode improved throttle response, and improved feedback with more aggressive steering and suspension settings. For 2016, the ELR could combine power from both the engine and electric motor when in Sport mode.

The EPA's 2014 "Light-Duty Automotive Technology, Carbon Dioxide Emissions, and Fuel Economy Trends" report calculated utility factors for plug-in hybrids to estimate the percentage of miles that would be driven using electricity by the average driver, in electric only or blended modes. The ELR scored a utility factor of 65%, compared with 83% for the BMW i3 REx, 66% for the Chevrolet Volt, 45% for the Ford Energi models, and 29% for the Toyota Prius PHV. Real world driving statistics (collected automatically by OnStar and shared by ELR owners on the Volt Stats website) showed a fleet total of 98.46 MPG (141.87 MPG median) as of August 2016.

== Production and sales ==
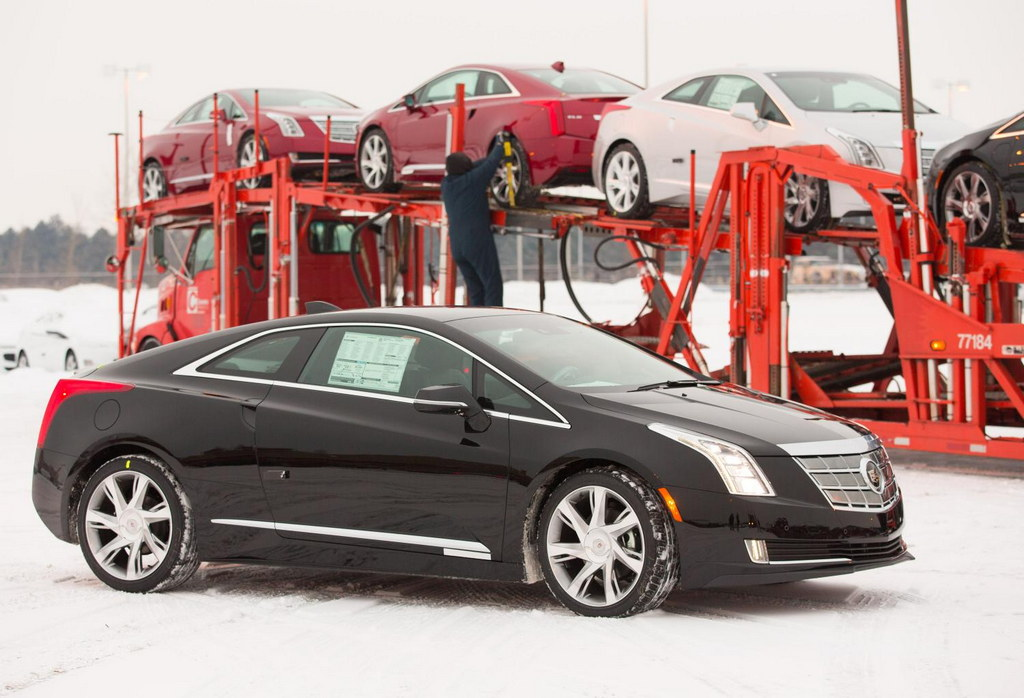
Shipping to dealers of the 2014 Cadillac ELR began in late December 2013.

In October 2012, General Motors announced that the ELR would be assembled at the Detroit-Hamtramck Assembly Plant, alongside the Chevrolet Volt, Opel Ampera, and Holden Volt. The addition of the ELR to the plant represented an additional US$35 million investment, bringing the total product investment at the plant to US$561 million since December 2009.

General Motors began assembly of pre-production vehicles to be used for testing in late May 2013. Production of vehicles destined for retail customers began in December 2013. Shipping to dealerships from Detroit-Hamtramck Assembly began on December 20, 2013 and, while retail deliveries were scheduled to begin in January 2014, the first 10 units were delivered early in December 2013—six in the U.S. and four in Canada.

In the United States, the 2014 ELR had a base price of US$75,000 before applicable government incentives. Due to slow early sales, Cadillac skipped the 2015 model year for the ELR. The 2016 model was released with a $10,000 lower base price ($58,495 after U.S. federal tax credits).

Calendar Year	Total sales	United States	Canada
2013	10	6	4
2014	1,354	1,310	44
2015	1,049	1,024	25
2016	545	534	11
Total	2,958	2,874	84

ELR production ended on February 18, 2016.

Cadillac announced that it would launch a new plug-in hybrid version of its CT6 sedan in late 2016.

== Awards and recognition ==
In 2009, the Converj concept was awarded "Best Concept Vehicle" in the Eyes on Design Awards, "Most Significant Concept Vehicle of 2009" in the North American Concept Vehicle of the Year Awards, and "Specialty Concept Vehicle of the Year" by the Southeast Automotive Media Organization.

In 2012, Green Car Journal selected the ELR as one of the five finalists in the Green Car Vision Awards.

In 2013, the ELR was awarded "Best Production Vehicle" in the Eyes on Design Awards.

In 2014, the ELR won the "Green Car Technology Award" for its Regen on Demand system, which allows the driver "to use paddle shifters on the steering wheel to temporarily regenerate energy and store it…in the battery pack for later use." The second generation Chevrolet Volt adopted a refined version of this system in the 2016 model year.

The updated 2016 ELR earned the "Vincentric Best Value in America" award for the lowest maintenance and repair costs in the "Luxury Electric/Plug-In Hybrid" class.

== Marketing ==
Cadillac launched the ELR marketing campaign with a 60-second television commercial. Called Poolside and featuring actor Neal McDonough, the commercial was prominently broadcast during the 2014 Winter Olympics opening ceremony, as well as before and during the 86th Academy Awards in March 2014.

The commercial opens with its protagonist, an American businessman portrayed by McDonough, casually dressed and standing by the outdoor swimming pool of his contemporary, upscale home, asking, "Why do we work so hard?" He walks through his home, interacting with his family, changing into business attire, ultimately standing by and unplugging his ELR – while extolling the American Dream, the Wright Brothers, NASA's Moon mission, Bill Gates and American work ethic and short annual leave – compared to other countries, unnamed. He finally asserts from the driver's seat of his ELR that the house and car are the benefit of only taking two weeks off in August, finally asking rhetorically, "N'est-ce pas?" and winking to the camera. GM targeted an audience earning $200,000 per year.

In 2014, USA Today said the ad "may be the best TV ad – not just car ad – of the year." Ad Age, describing the ad as contentious and controversial, reported that "fans on the political right see Poolside as an unapologetic ode to American values. Critics on the political left see it as Ugly American chest thumping at its worst. During a time when Americans are working harder and longer for less money, others question the spot's perceived workaholic message." Ford subsequently parodied Poolside with a commercial for its Ford C-Max hybrid, featuring a spokesperson for a group that promotes urban farming, praising "hard work not for material gain, but in the name of progress," also ending with a rhetorical "N'est-ce pas?"

== See also ==
- Electric car use by country
- Government incentives for plug-in electric vehicles
- List of modern production plug-in electric vehicles
- List of production battery electric vehicles
- Plug-in electric vehicle

== Sources ==
- Leno, Jay (Host); Saucedo, Frank (Guest) (June 17, 2013). 2014 Cadillac ELR. Jay Leno's Garage (Web video). Burbank, California: NBC Studio.
