= List of motor vehicle awards =

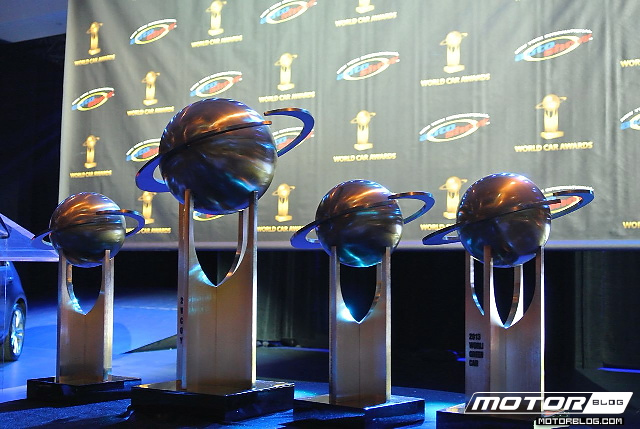
World Car Awards New York 2013

This list of motor vehicle awards is an index to articles that describe notable awards given to motor vehicles. The list is broken into "car of the year", other car awards, awards for commercial vehicles including trucks and trains, engines and people. The sub-lists are arranged by the country of the sponsoring organization, but typically awards are open to entries from around the world.

== Car of the year ==
Country/Region	Award	Sponsor
Australia	Wheels Car of the Year	Wheels
Canada	Canadian Car of the Year	Automobile Journalists Association of Canada
Europe	European Car of the Year	Car of the Year (magazines)
Germany	German Car of The Year	Bridgestone
India	Indian Car of the Year	ICOTY (magazines)
International	World Car of the Year	World Car of the Year
Ireland	Irish Car of the Year	Irish Motoring Writers Association
Japan	Car of the Year Japan	Japan Car of the Year
Japan	RJC Car of the Year (Japan)	Automotive Researchers' and Journalists' Conference of Japan
Middle East / United Arab Emirates	Middle East Car of the Year	Middle East Car of the Year
South Africa	South African Car of the Year	South African Guild of Motoring Journalists
South Korea	Korea Car of the Year	Korea Car of the Year
United Kingdom	Cars of the Year	What Car?
United Kingdom	Fifth Gear Awards	Fifth Gear
United Kingdom	Top Gear Car of the Year	Top Gear
United States	Automobile of the Year	Automobile
United States	Green Car of the Year	Green Car Journal
United States	International Car of the Year	Road & Travel Magazine
United States	Motor Trend Car of the Year	Motor Trend
United States	MotorWeek Drivers' Choice Awards	MotorWeek
United States	North American Car of the Year	North American International Auto Show

== Other car awards ==
Country	Award	Sponsor	Notes
France	Peugeot Concours Design	Peugeot	Designs for a car (2001 to 2008)
Germany	Das Goldene Lenkrad	Bild am Sonntag, Auto Bild	New car models
United Kingdom	Dewar Trophy	Royal Automobile Club	The motor car which should successfully complete the most meritorious performance or test furthering the interests and advancement of the industry
International	Edison Awards	Edison Awards	Honoring excellence in innovation
United States	Ridler Award	Detroit Autorama	Best in show
United States	America's Most Beautiful Roadster	Grand National Roadster Show	Roadsters (since 1950)
United States	Automotive X Prize	X Prize Foundation	Inspire a new generation of super-efficient vehicles that help break America's addiction to oil and stem the effects of climate change
United States	Car and Driver 10Best	Car and Driver	Ten best cars of the year
United States	Car and Driver Supercar Challenge	Car and Driver	High-powered sports cars
United States	Car of the Century	Global Automotive Elections Foundation	World's most influential car of the 20th century
United States	Green Car Vision Award	Green Car Journal	Significant environmental advancements: pre-production and production cars
United States	Index of Effluency	24 Hours of LeMons	Index of Thermal Efficiency of a vehicle that was deemed unreliable from the factory
United States	Best of Show	Pebble Beach Concours d'Elegance	Prewar and postwar collector cars judged for authenticity, function, history, and style
United States	MotorWeek Drivers' Choice Awards	MotorWeek	Best automotive picks in the most popular vehicle categories
United States	PACE Award	Automotive News	Innovation developed primarily by a supplier that changes the rules of the game

== Commercial vehicles ==
Country	Award	Sponsor	Notes
Europe	Bus & Coach of the Year	(industry publications)	Bus and coach models on the European market
Europe	International Truck of the Year	(industry / publications)	New vehicles appearing on the European market
Europe	International Van of the Year	(industry / publications)	New vehicles appearing on the European market
Japan	Blue Ribbon Award (railway)	Japan Railfan Club	Railway vehicles voted by members as being the most outstanding design of the year (since 1958)
Japan	Laurel Prize	Japan Railfan Club	Railway vehicles with the most outstanding functional and design features
United States	Green Truck of the Year	Green Car Journal	

== Engines ==
Country	Award	Sponsor	Notes
United Kingdom	International Engine of the Year	UKi Media & Events' Automotive Magazines	Subjective driving impressions, technical knowledge, and characteristics such as fuel economy, noise, smoothness, performance and driveability
United States	Ward's 10 Best Engines	Ward's AutoWorld	Best" automobile engines available in the U.S. market

== People ==
Country	Award	Sponsor	Notes
Norway	Automotive Executive of the Year Award	DNV GL - Business Assurance	Excellence in leadership and innovation
United States	Automotive Hall of Fame	MotorCities National Heritage Area	Person has made a significant contribution to the automotive industry
United States	Car Designer of the Century	Global Automotive Elections Foundation	Most influential car designer of the 20th century
United States	Car Engineer of the Century	Global Automotive Elections Foundation	Most influential car engineer of the twentieth century
United States	Car Entrepreneur of the Century	Global Automotive Elections Foundation	Most influential car entrepreneur of the 20th century
United States	Louis Schwitzer Award	Society of Automotive Engineers	Engineer, or a team of engineers, for excellence in the design, development and implementation of new, innovative motorsports technology concepts for use in the Indianapolis 500 Mile Race
United States	Time Magazine Quality Dealer Award	Time, Ally Financial	New-car dealers in America who exhibit exceptional performance in their dealerships and perform distinguished community service

== See also ==
- Lists of awards
- List of design awards
- List of business and industry awards
- List of engineering awards
