= Green Truck of the Year =

The Green Truck of the Year is an award from the Green Car Journal. The winner is announced each fall at the San Antonio Auto & Truck Show in Texas. The award was introduced in 2015 to complement the current Green Car of the Year award.

== Winners ==
2015 — RAM 1500 EcoDiesel
2016 — Ford F-150
2017 — Honda Ridgeline
2018 — Chevy Colorado
2019 — Ram 1500
2020 — Ram 1500
2021 — Ford F-150
2022 — Ford Maverick
2023 — Ram 1500

== See also ==
- List of motor vehicle awards
- Green Car Vision Award
- Green vehicle
- PACE Award
- United States Environmental Protection Agency
