= Green Car of the Year =

Car of the Year award

2008 Green Car of the Year logo

The Green Car of the Year is a Car of the Year award from the Green Car Journal. The winner is selected by an 11-member panel comprising automotive and environmental experts. Invited jurors have included Mario Andretti; Carroll Shelby, Jay Leno, Carl Pope (Sierra Club), Christopher Flavin (Worldwatch Institute), Jonathan Lash (World Resources Institute) and Jean-Michel Cousteau (Ocean Futures Society).

A separate Green Truck of the Year award was launched in 2015.

In early October 2015, the 2009 and 2010 awards were rescinded as a result of the Volkswagen emissions scandal.

== Winners ==
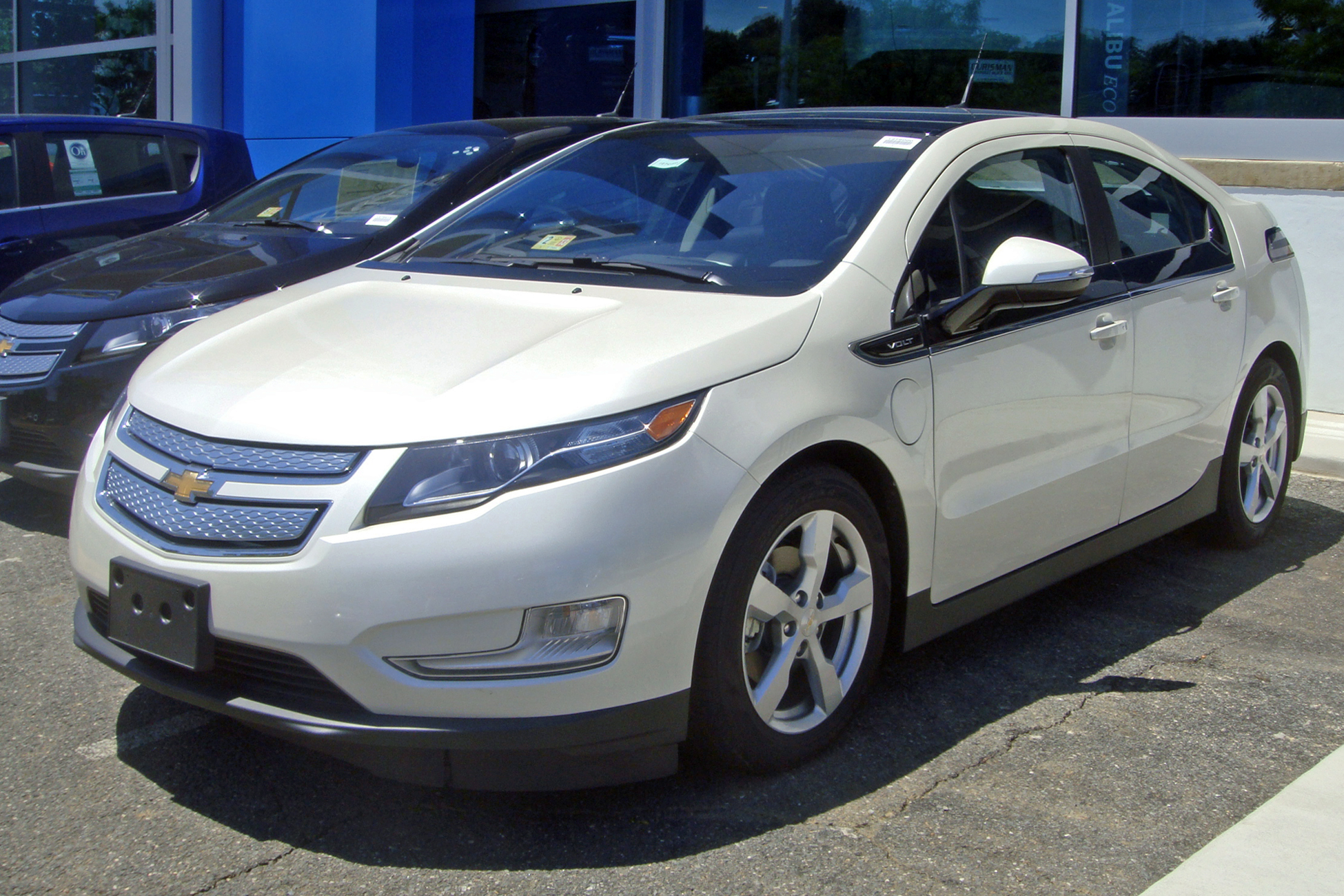
The 2011 Chevrolet Volt plug-in hybrid was awarded the 2011 Green Car of the Year.

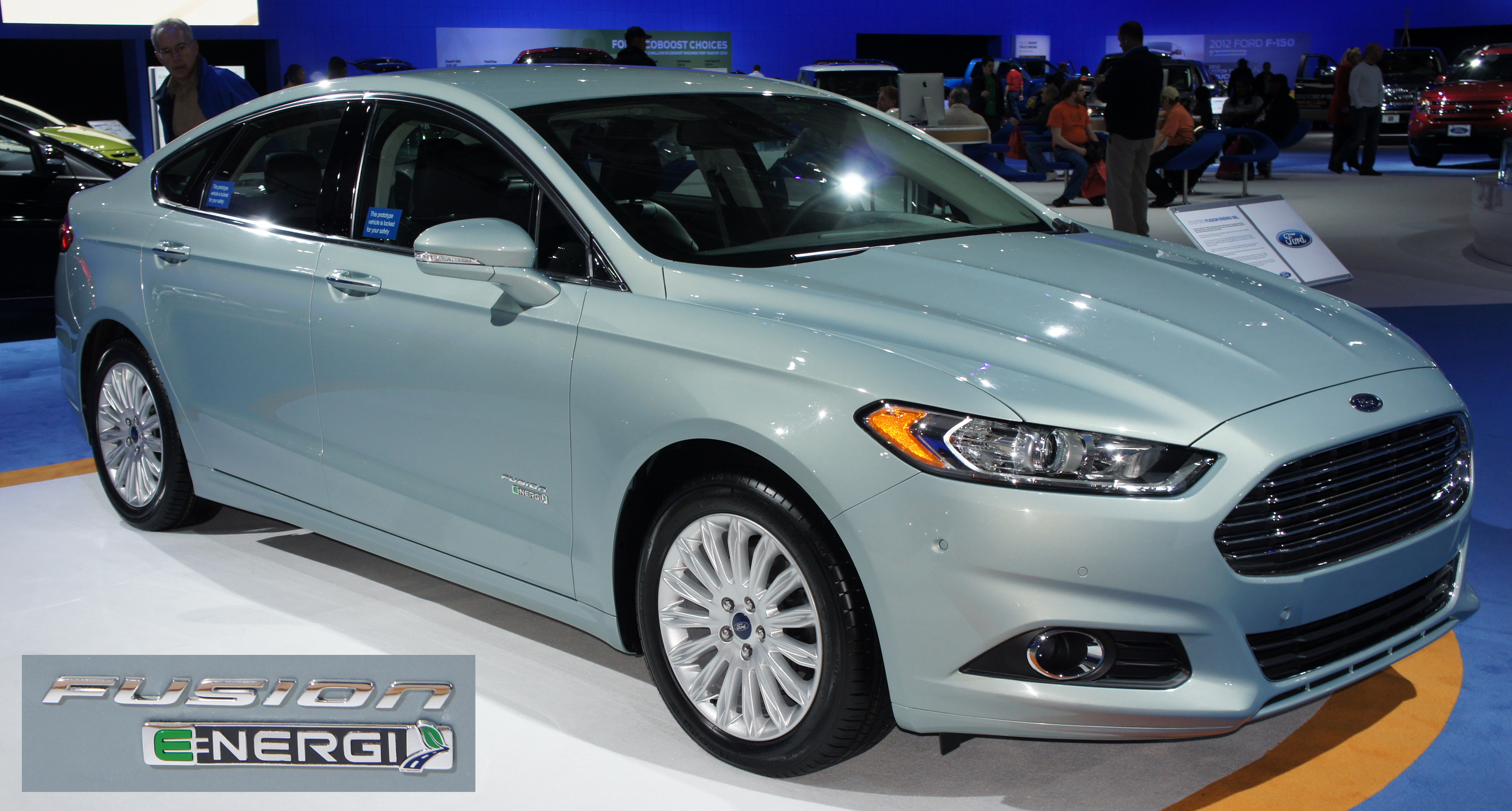
The 2013 Ford Fusion Energi plug-in hybrid was awarded the 2013 Green Car of the Year together with the EcoBoost gasoline engine option, and the conventional hybrid variant.

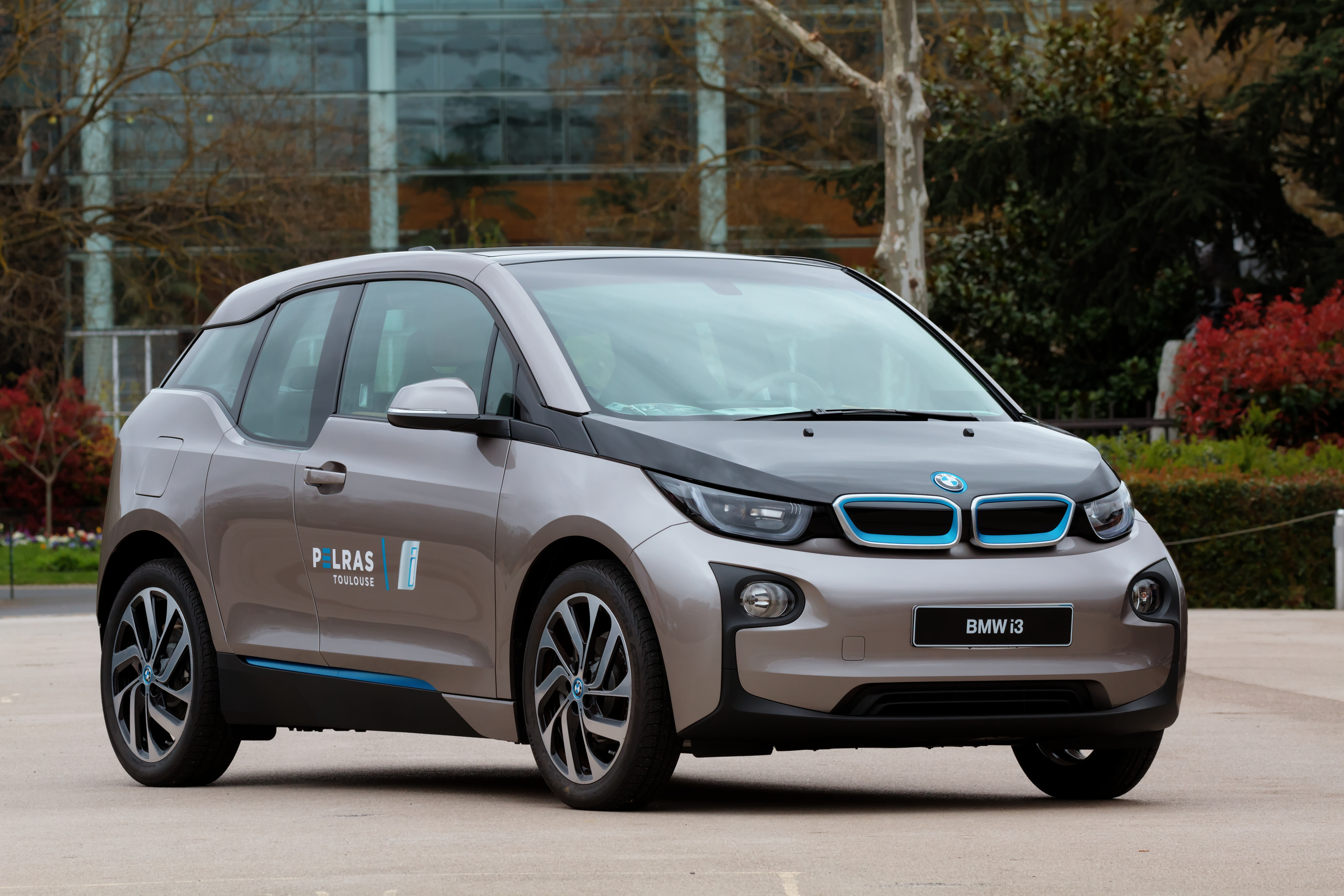
The 2014 BMW i3 was awarded the 2015 Green Car of the Year.

2006 — Mercury Mariner Hybrid
2007 — Toyota Camry Hybrid
2008 — Chevrolet Tahoe Hybrid
2009 — ~~Volkswagen Jetta Clean Diesel~~ (Rescinded due to Volkswagen emissions scandal)

The other four finalists were the BMW 335d, the Ford Fusion Hybrid, Saturn Vue 2 Mode Hybrid, and the Smart Fortwo. In 2015, VW admitted their diesel line from 2009-2015 was designed to correctly limit nitrogen oxide (NOx) emissions only during static testing.

2010 — ~~Audi A3 TDI Clean Diesel~~ (Rescinded due to Volkswagen emissions scandal)

The other finalists were the Honda Insight, the Mercury Milan Hybrid, the Toyota Prius and the clean diesel VW Golf TDI. Like the 2009 Volkswagen Jetta, the winning 2010 Audi and the 2010 VW Golf were diesel vehicles that Volkswagen admitted in 2015 were designed to limit NOx emissions only when being emission tested.

2011 — Chevrolet Volt plug-in hybrid.

The other finalists were the Nissan Leaf battery electric car, the hybrid electric versions of the Hyundai Sonata and the Lincoln MKZ, and the gasoline-powered Ford Fiesta, which achieves 40 miles per US gallon (5.9 L/100 km; 48 mpg_{‑imp}) in highway driving.

2012 — Honda Civic GX natural gas vehicle.

The other finalists were the Ford Focus Electric and Mitsubishi i battery electric cars, Toyota Prius v hybrid electric car, and the Volkswagen Passat TDI clean diesel. (See 2009 and 2010 listings regarding clean diesel.)

2013 — Ford Fusion second generation line-up, including the EcoBoost gasoline engine option, and the Fusion hybrid and plug-in variants.

The other finalists were the Ford C-Max hybrid and plug-in hybrid, Dodge Dart Aero, Toyota Prius c hybrid electric car, and the Mazda CX-5.

2014 — Honda Accord ninth generation line-up, including gasoline, hybrid, and plug-in hybrid variants.

The other finalists were the BMW 328d, Audi A6 TDI, Toyota Corolla, and the Mazda3.

2015 — BMW i3

The other finalists were the Audi A3 TDI, Chevrolet Impala Bi-Fuel, third generation Honda Fit, and seventh-generation Volkswagen Golf line-up.

2016 — Second generation Chevrolet Volt

The other finalists were the Audi A3 e-tron, the fourth generation Toyota Prius, the 2016 Hyundai Sonata, and the 2016 Honda Civic. The Chevrolet Volt became the first model to be awarded Green Car Of The Year more than once.

2017 — Chevrolet Bolt EV

The other finalists were the Toyota Prius Prime, the Chrysler Pacifica Hybrid, the Kia Optima (including hybrid and plug-in hybrid models) and the BMW 330e iPerformance.

2018 — Honda Clarity group of vehicles

2019 — Honda Insight

2020 — Toyota Corolla

2021 — Ford Mustang Mach-E

2022 — Audi Q4 e-tron

2023 — Toyota Crown

2024 — Toyota Prius PHEV

2025 — Toyota Camry HEV

2026 — Toyota RAV4 HEV

== See also ==
- List of motor vehicle awards
- Green Car Vision Award
- Green vehicle
- PACE Award
- United States Environmental Protection Agency
