= MotorWeek Drivers' Choice Awards =

The MotorWeek Drivers’ Choice Awards are one of the many yearly Car of the Year awards. This one is given by MotorWeek, an American television automotive magazine series.

Since 1983, MotorWeek has presented its Drivers’ Choice Awards which are among the auto industry's most prestigious honors. The Drivers’ Choice Awards provide a consumer focus and represent a list of best automotive picks in the most popular vehicle categories, including the “Best of the Year” award. They are presented annually in February during the Chicago Auto Show.

== Categories ==
As of 2011, the categories are:

- Best of the Year
- Best Small Car
- Best Family Sedan
- Best Sport Sedan
- Best Luxury Sedan
- Best Convertible
- Best Small Utility
- Best Large Utility
- Best Pickup Truck
- Best Minivan
- Best Sport Coupe
- Best Performance Car
- Best Eco-Friendly
- Best Dream Machine

Until 1998, some categories were separated into imports and domestics. Various name and category changes happened as well through the years.

== Drivers' Choice Awards Winners ==
Year	Awards
2020	Best of the Year Chevrolet Corvette Stingray Best Small Car Mazda3 Best Family Sedan Hyundai Sonata Best Sport Sedan BMW 3 Series Best Luxury Sedan Audi A6 Best Convertible BMW Z4 Best Small Utility Toyota RAV4 Best Midsize Utility Honda Passport Best Large Utility Hyundai Palisade, Kia Telluride Best Luxury Utility Mercedes-Benz GLE Best Pickup Truck Ram Pickup Trucks Best Sport Coupe Toyota GR Supra Best Performance Car Chevrolet Corvette Stingray Best Eco-Friendly Kia Niro Best Dream Machine Ford Mustang Shelby GT500, Mercedes-AMG GT R, Porsche Taycan Turbo S
2019	Best of the Year Jaguar I-Pace Best Small Car Kia Forte Best Family Sedan Nissan Altima Best Sport Sedan Volvo S60 Best Luxury Sedan Genesis G70 Best Convertible Mazda MX-5 Miata Best Small Utility Toyota RAV4 Best Midsize Utility Ford Edge Best Large Utility Volkswagen Atlas Best Luxury Utility Jaguar I-Pace Best Pickup Truck Ram 1500 Best Sport Coupe Hyundai Veloster N Best Performance Car Dodge Challenger SRT Hellcat Redeye Best Eco-Friendly Honda Clarity Best Dream Machine Bentley Continental GT, Ferrari 812 Superfast, Porsche Panamera
2018	Best of the Year Kia Stinger Best Small Car Honda Civic Best Family Sedan Honda Accord Best Sport Sedan Kia Stinger Best Luxury Sedan BMW 5 Series Best Convertible Mazda MX-5 Miata RF Best Small Utility Mazda CX-5 Best Large Utility Volkswagen Atlas Best Pickup Truck Ford F-Series Best Minivan Honda Odyssey Best Sport Coupe Lexus LC500 Best Performance Car Dodge Challenger SRT Demon, Jeep Grand Cherokee Trackhawk Best Eco-Friendly Chevrolet Bolt EV Best Dream Machine Aston Martin DB11, Porsche 911 GT2 RS, Mercedes-Benz G550 4×4²
2011	Best of the Year Chevrolet Volt Best Small Car Volkswagen Jetta Best Family Sedan Hyundai Sonata Best Sport Sedan BMW 5 Series Best Luxury Sedan Infiniti M Best Convertible Mercedes-Benz E-Class Cabriolet Best Small Utility Chevrolet Equinox Best Large Utility Jeep Grand Cherokee, Dodge Durango Best Pickup Truck Ford F-Series Best Minivan Honda Odyssey Best Sport Coupe Cadillac CTS Coupe Best Performance Car Ford Mustang GT Best Eco-Friendly Chevrolet Volt Best Dream Machine Audi R8 Spyder, Alfa Romeo 8C Spider, Bentley Continental Supersports
2010	Best of the Year Toyota Prius Best Small Car Mazda3 Best Family Sedan Ford Taurus Best Convertible Nissan 370Z Roadster Best Luxury Sedan Buick LaCrosse Best Sport Sedan BMW 3 Series Best Sport Coupe Chevrolet Camaro Best Performance Car Audi S4 Best Small Utility Chevrolet Equinox Best Large Utility Honda Pilot Best Pickup Truck Dodge Ram 1500 Best Eco-Friendly Toyota Prius Best Dream Machine Audi R8 5.2 FS, Mercedes-Benz SLS AMG
2009	Best of the Year Volkswagen Jetta TDI Best Small Car Honda Fit Best Family Sedan Mazda6 Best Minivan Dodge Grand Caravan/Chrysler Town & Country Best Convertible BMW 1 Series Best Luxury Sedan Hyundai Genesis Best Sport Sedan Cadillac CTS Best Sport Coupe Audi A5/Audi S5 Best Performance Car Nissan GT-R Best Small Utility Subaru Forester Best Large Utility Honda Pilot Best Pickup Truck Dodge Ram 1500 Best Eco-Friendly Volkswagen Jetta TDI Best Dream Machine Chevrolet Corvette ZR1, Ferrari California
2008	Best of the Year Scion xB Best Small Car Scion xB Best Family Sedan Honda Accord Best Minivan Dodge Grand Caravan/Chrysler Town & Country Best Convertible Chrysler Sebring Convertible Best Luxury Sedan Mercedes-Benz C-Class Best Sport Sedan Cadillac CTS Best Sport Coupe Infiniti G37 Best Performance Car Volkswagen R32 Best Small Utility Nissan Rogue Best Large Utility Chevrolet Tahoe/GMC Yukon Best Pickup Truck Ford F-Series Super Duty Best Crossover Utility GMC Acadia/Saturn Outlook Best Eco-Friendly Chevrolet Tahoe Hybrid/GMC Yukon Hybrid Best Dream Machine Audi R8, Bentley Continental GT Speed, Lexus LS 600h L
2007	Best of the Year Honda Fit Best Small Car Honda Fit Best Family Sedan Saturn Aura Best Minivan Hyundai Entourage/Kia Sedona Best Convertible Volkswagen Eos Best Luxury Sedan Lexus LS Best Sport Coupe Audi A5, Audi S5 Best Performance Car Ford Shelby GT 500 Best Small Utility Honda CR-V Best Large Utility Chevrolet Tahoe/GMC Yukon Best Pickup Truck Dodge Ram 1500 Best Crossover Utility GMC Acadia/Saturn Outlook Best Eco-Friendly Toyota Motor Corporation Best Dream Machine Jaguar XKR, Ferrari 599 GTB Fiorano, Porsche 911 Turbo
2006	Best of the Year Honda Civic Best Small Car Honda Civic Best Family Sedan Hyundai Sonata Best Minivan Honda Odyssey Best Convertible Pontiac Solstice Best Luxury Sedan Infiniti M Best Sport Sedan BMW 3-Series Best Performance Car Ford Mustang Best Small SUV Toyota RAV4 Best Family SUV Ford Explorer/Mercury Mountaineer Best Pickup Truck Ford F-150 Best Eco-Friendly Toyota Highlander Hybrid Best Dream Machine Chevrolet Corvette Z06, Dodge Viper SRT10 Coupe, Ferrari F430 Special Category – Most Jane Car BMW 3-Series
2005	Best of the Year Ford Mustang Best Small Car Mazda3 Best Family Sedan Chrysler 300 Best Station Wagon Subaru Legacy/Subaru Outback Best Minivan Honda Odyssey Best Convertible Mini Cooper Convertible Best Luxury Sedan Audi A6 Best Sport Sedan Cadillac CTS-V Best Performance Car Ford Mustang Best Sport-Utility Vehicle Jeep Wrangler/Jeep Liberty/Jeep Grand Cherokee Best Full-Size Pickup Truck Ford F-150 Best Mid-Size Pickup Truck Nissan Frontier Best Eco-Friendly Ford Escape Hybrid Best Dream Machines Chevrolet Corvette, Lotus Elise, Porsche Carrera GT
2004	Best of the Year Volkswagen Touareg Best Small Car Mazda3 Best Family Sedan Chevrolet Malibu Best Minivan Toyota Sienna Best Convertible Audi A4 1.8 T Cabriolet Best Luxury Sedan Mercedes-Benz E-Class Best Sport Sedan Acura TL Best Performance Car Subaru Impreza WRX STi Best Small Sport-Utility Vehicle Honda Element Best Mid-Size Sport-Utility Vehicle Volkswagen Touareg Best Family Sport-Utility Vehicle Dodge Durango Best Pickup Truck Ford F-150 Best Eco-Friendly Toyota Prius Best Dream Machine Bentley Continental GT, Ford GT
2003	Best of the Year Nissan 350Z Best Small Car Mini Cooper Best Family Sedan Saab 9-3 Best Convertible Volkswagen New Beetle Convertible Best Luxury Sedan Mercedes-Benz E-Class Best Sport Sedan Mazda6 Best Performance Car Nissan 350Z Best Small Sport-Utility Vehicle Honda Element Best Mid-Size Sport-Utility Vehicle Kia Sorento Best Family Sport-Utility Vehicle Ford Expedition Best Pickup Truck Dodge Ram Best Eco-Friendly Honda Civic Best Dream Machine Lamborghini Murcielago, Mercedes-Benz SL55 AMG
2002	Best of the Year Nissan Altima Best Small Car Nissan Sentra Best Family Sedan Nissan Altima Best Minivan Dodge Caravan/Chrysler Voyager/Chrysler Town & Country Best Convertible Ford Thunderbird Best Luxury Sedan Cadillac CTS Best Sport Sedan Subaru Impreza WRX Best Performance Car Chevrolet Corvette C5 Z06 Best Small Sport-Utility Vehicle Saturn Vue Best Family Sport-Utility Vehicle Ford Explorer/Mercury Mountaineer Best Pickup Truck Dodge Ram Best Cross-Over Vehicle Chevrolet Avalanche/Cadillac Escalade EXT Best Dream Machine Ferrari 360 Spider, Mercedes-Benz SL55 AMG, Porsche 911 GT2
1985	Econobox Dodge Colt#Fifth generation

== Best of the Year Winners by Manufacturer ==
Wins	Manufacturer	Winning cars
2	(Japan) Nissan	Altima (2002); 350Z (2003)
2	(Germany) Volkswagen	Touareg (2004); Jetta TDI (2009)
2	(Japan) Honda	Civic (2006); Fit (2007)
1	(United States) Ford	Mustang (2005)
1	(Japan) Scion	xB (2008)
1	(Japan) Toyota	Prius (2010)
1	(United States) Chevrolet	Volt (2011)

== See also ==
- List of motor vehicle awards
