= Time Magazine Quality Dealer Award =

The Time Magazine Quality Dealer Award (TMQDA) is an annual Time Magazine-sponsored award, in partnership with Ally Financial, honoring new car dealers in America who exhibit exceptional performance in their dealerships and perform distinguished community service. It is the automobile industry's most prestigious and coveted award for car dealerships. Dealers are nominated by members of the Automotive Trade Association Executives (ATAE). Finalists and winners are chosen by a panel of faculty members from the University of Michigan's Tauber Institute for Global Operations. The "TIME Magazine Dealer of the Year" award is presented at the annual National Automobile Dealers Association (NADA) convention.

== National TIME Dealer of the Year Winners ==
=== 1960s ===
- 1960 — W. Bankston
- 1961 — John Landers
- 1962 — Richard Stoudt, Sr.
- 1963 — I. Burton (I.G. Burton Company, Inc. in Milford, Delaware)
- 1964 — Charles Medick
- 1965 — Herb Abramson (Chestnut Hill, Massachusetts)
- 1966 — George Higgins
- 1967 —
- 1968 — C. Thomas
- 1969 — William Rohrer

=== 1970s ===
- 1970 — O. Noller
- 1971 — Nicholas Lattof
- 1972 — Roy Butler (Coors of Austin in Austin, Texas)
- 1973 — Harmon Born (Beaudry Ford, Inc. in Atlanta, Georgia)
- 1974 — Rolland Patterson (Rancho Mirage, California)
- 1975 — W. Cook
- 1976 — Frank England, Jr. (England Motor Company in Greenville, Mississippi)
- 1977 — Warren McEleney (McEleney Motors, Inc. in Clinton, Iowa) and Robert Rice (Bob Rice Ford Inc. in Boise, Idaho)
- 1978 — Edward Glockner (Glockner Chevrolet in Portsmouth, Ohio)
- 1979 — John Pohanka (Pohanka Oldsmobile-GMC, Inc. in Marlow Heights, Maryland)

=== 1980s ===
- 1980 — Edward Rikess (Scottsdale, Arizona)
- 1981 — Ray Shepherd (Ray Shepherd Motors, Inc. in Fort Scott, Kansas)
- 1982 — Richard Strauss (Richmond, Virginia)
- 1983 — John Cooper
- 1984 — James Willingham (Boulevard Buick-Pontiac- GMC Truck in Long Beach, California)
- 1985 — H.F. Boeckmann, II (Galpin Motors, Inc. in North Hills, California)
- 1986 — Joshua Darden (Colonial Chevrolet in Norfolk, Virginia)
- 1987 — Bob Russell (Russell Chevrolet Co. in Sherwood, Arkansas)
- 1988 — Sam Pack (Lee Jarmon Ford, Inc. in Carrollton, Texas)
- 1989 — Lou Fusz (Lou Fusz Automotive Network in St. Louis, Missouri)

=== 1990s ===
- 1990 — James Lupient (Lupient Oldsmobile-Isuzu-Sterling in Minneapolis, Minnesota)
- 1991 — Jack Krenzen (Krenzen Indoor Auto Mall in Duluth, Minnesota)
- 1992 — Sheilah Garcia (Garcia Honda in Albuquerque, New Mexico)
- 1993 — Richard Fitzpatrick, Jr. (Crest Lincoln-Mercury-Isuzu in Woodbridge, Connecticut)
- 1994 — Lorne Schlatter (Quality Motors, Inc. in Independence, Kansas)
- 1995 — William Adamson (Adamson Motors, Inc. in Rochester, Minnesota)
- 1996 — David Parker (Parker Cadillac Inc. in Little Rock, Arkansas)
- 1997 — Talton Anderson (Baxter Auto in Omaha, Nebraska)
- 1998 — Dale Critz, Sr. (Critz Auto Group in Savannah, Georgia) and Randy Hansen (Randy Hansen Chevrolet, Inc. in Twin Falls, Idaho)
- 1999 — Charlie Zook (Charlie Zook Motors, Inc. in Sioux City, Iowa)

=== 2000s ===
- 2000 — Don Williamson (Moore Buick Pontiac GMC Truck in Jacksonville, North Carolina)
- 2001 — Martin NeSmith (NeSmith Chevrolet-Buick-Pontiac-GMC, Inc in Claxton, GA)
- 2002 — George Nahas (George Nahas Oldsmobile, Inc. in Tavares, Florida)
- 2003 — John Bergstrom (Bergstrom Automotive in Neenah, Wisconsin)
- 2004 — Paul Holloway (Dreher Holloway Inc. in Greenland, New Hampshire)
- 2005 — Ralph Seekins (Seekins Ford Lincoln Mercury in Fairbanks, Alaska)
- 2006 — Bennie F. Ryburn III (Ryburn Motor Company, Inc. in Monticello, Arkansas)
- 2007 — Tracy Shields Jones (Century Automotive Group, Inc. in Huntsville, Alabama)
- 2008 — Timothy J. Smith (Bob Smith BMW/Mini in Calabasas, California)
- 2009 — George P. Fritze (Red River Motor Co. in Bossier City, Louisiana)

=== 2010s ===
- 2010 — Scott H. Wood (Stanley Wood Chevrolet Pontiac Co./Scott Wood Chrysler, Dodge, Jeep in Batesville, Arkansas)
- 2011 — Thomas Castriota (Castriota Chevrolet) in Hudson, Florida
- 2012 — Mike Shaw (Mike Shaw Chevrolet Saab in Denver, Colorado)
- 2013 — Michael Alford (Marine Chevrolet Cadillac in Jacksonville, North Carolina)
- 2014 — Jeff Teague (Teague Ford Lincoln in El Dorado, Arkansas)
- 2015 — Andy Crews (AutoFair Honda in Manchester, New Hampshire)
- 2016 — Mary Catherine Van Bortel (Van Bortel Motorcar Inc. in Victor, New York: Subaru, Chevrolet, Ford)
- 2017 - Carl Swope (Swope Toyota, Elizabethtown, Kentucky)
- 2018 - Jack Salzman (Lake Norman Chrysler-Dodge-Jeep-RAM, Cornelius, North Carolina)
- 2019 - John Alfirevich (Apple Chevrolet, Tinley Park, Illinois)
- 2020 - Susan Moffitt (Audi Shreveport, Shreveport, Louisiana)

== See also ==
- List of motor vehicle awards
