= Green Car Vision Award =

Annual automotive award

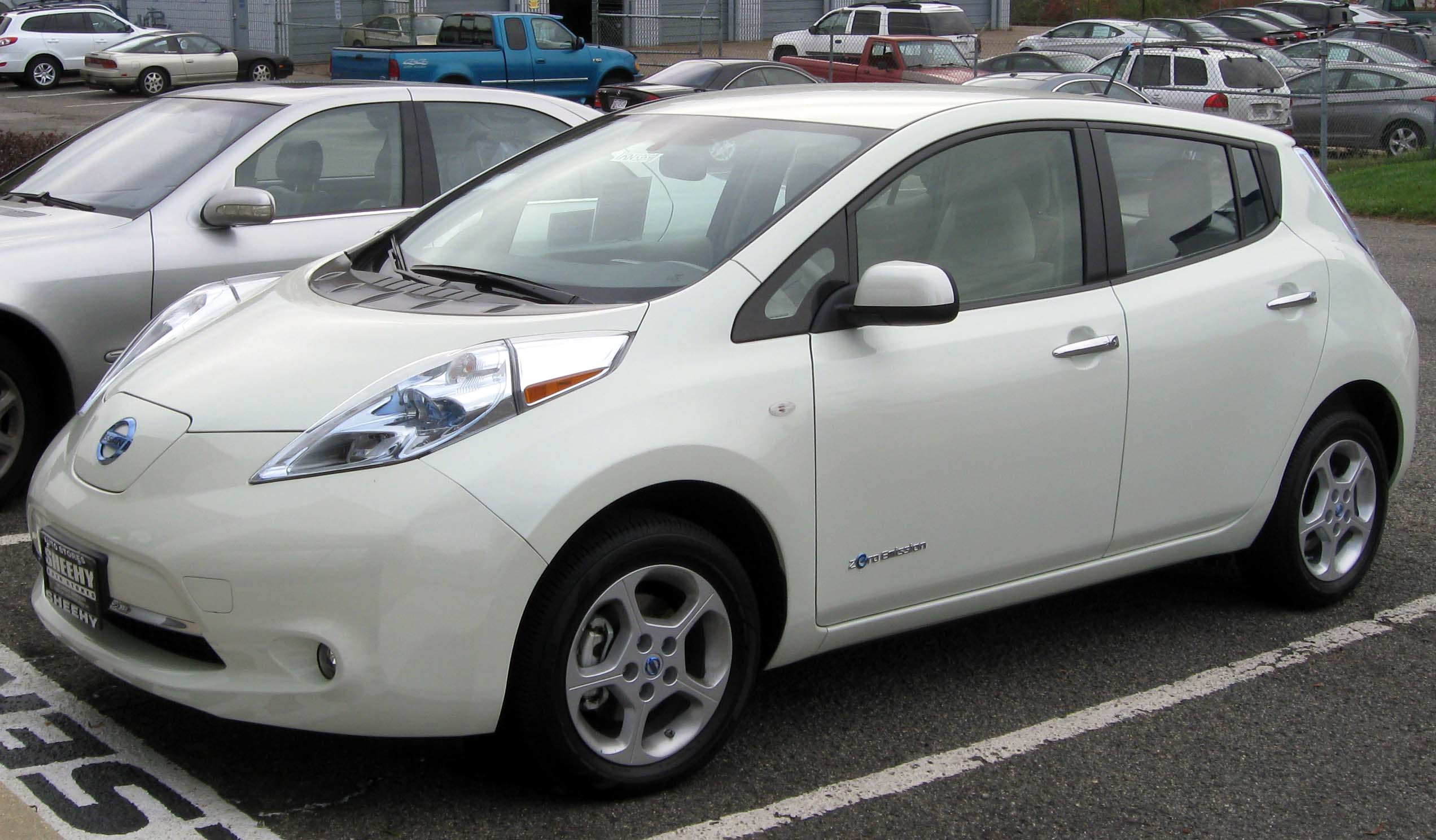

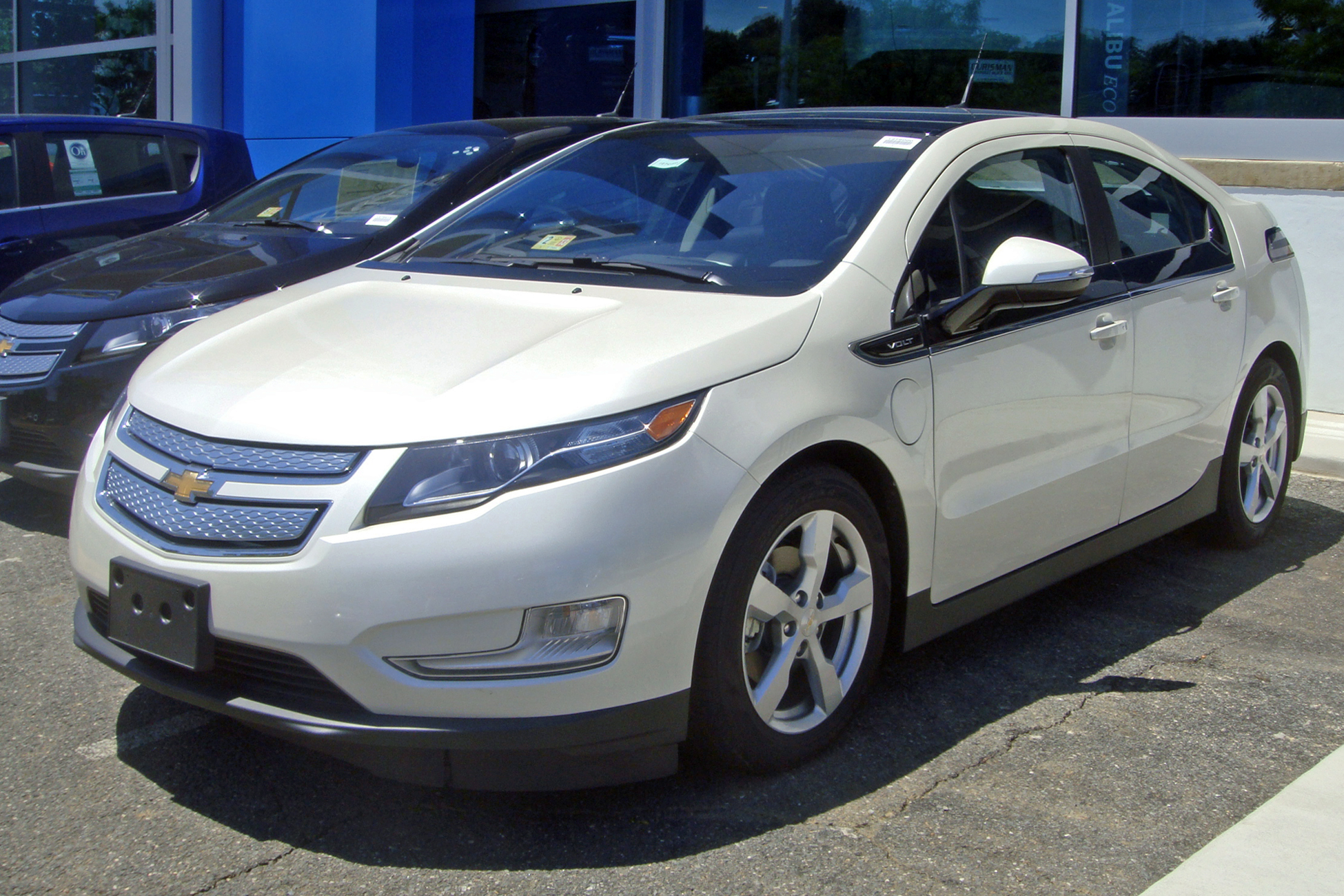
The Nissan Leaf (top) was awarded the 2010 Green Car Vision Award, and the Chevrolet Volt (bottom) the 2009 award.

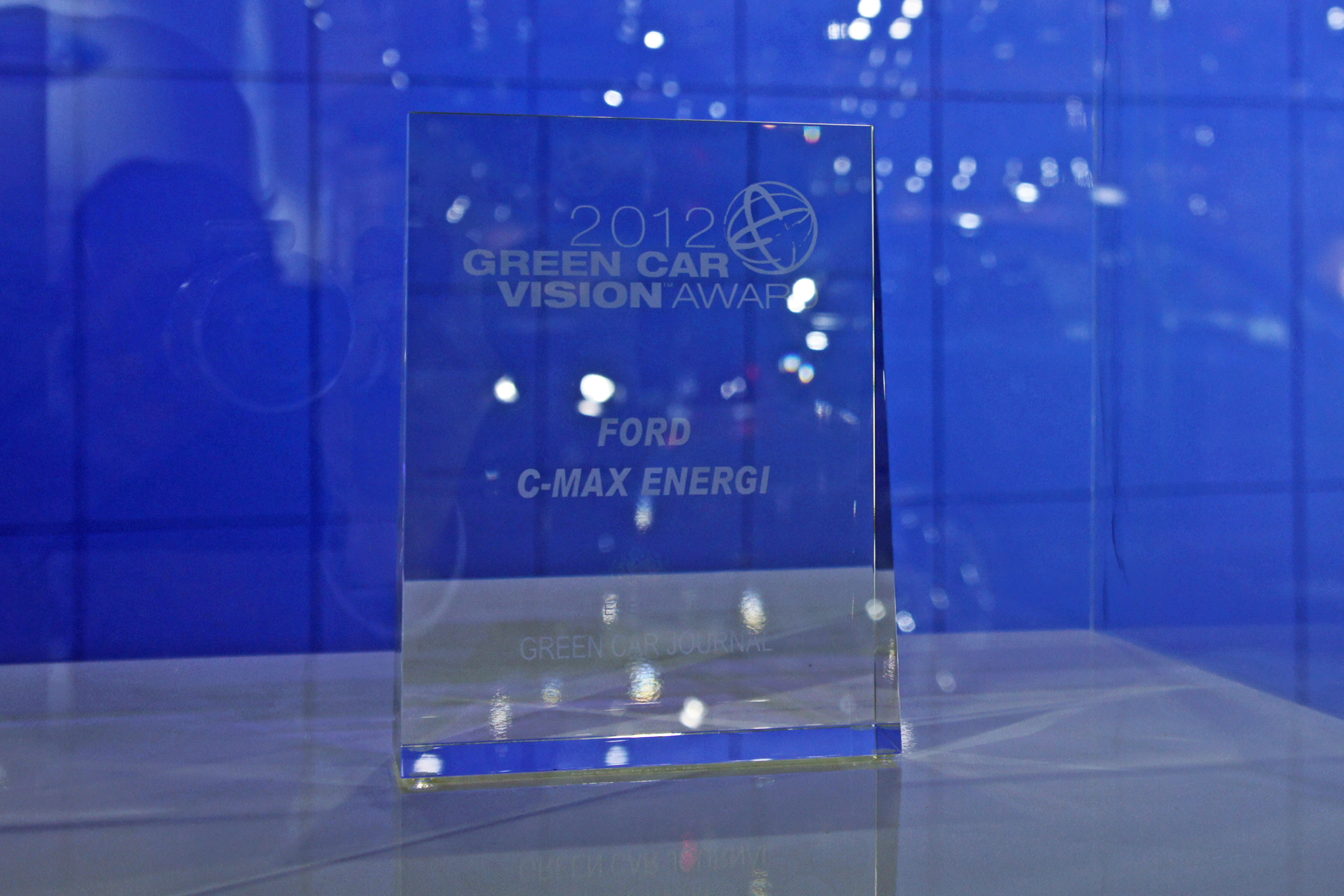
2012 Green Car Vision Award won by the Ford C-Max Energi plug-in hybrid

The Green Car Vision Award is an annual award granted by the Green Car Journal. In contrast with its Green Car of the Year award, which only considers production vehicles that make the most significant environmental advancements, the Green Car Vision Award considers pre-production vehicles with more than one functional prototype in existence and that may be in the early stages of commercialization. Vehicles that are part of a demonstration fleet or other program that finds them regularly driven by people other than employees of their manufacturer may also be considered. Nominees may also include a modification of an existing vehicle model, such as a conversion to another type of power like electric drive.

The Green Car Vision Award was created in 2008, and the winners were announced at the Washington Auto Show. In 2013, the award was changed to Green Car Technology Award, which unlike the previous award, is not limited to a specific car model.

== Winners ==
2008 —Chevrolet Equinox Fuel Cell hydrogen fuel cell vehicle.

The other four 2009 nominees were the BMW Hydrogen 7, a bi-fuel gasoline-hydrogen car, the Honda FCX Clarity hydrogen fuel cell car, the Phoenix Electric SUT all-electric sports utility truck, and the Toyota Prius Plug-in Hybrid.

2009 —Chevrolet Volt plug-in hybrid car.

The other 2009 nominees were the Fisker Karma plug-in hybrid, the Honda FCX Clarity hydrogen fuel cell car, the Mini E all-electric car, and the Mitsubishi i MiEV all-electric car.

2010 —Nissan Leaf battery electric car.

The other 2010 nominees were the Coda electric sedan, the Ford Focus BEV electric car, the Mercedes-Benz F-Cell hydrogen fuel cell vehicle, and the Toyota Prius PHV plug-in hybrid.

2011 —Ford Focus Electric battery electric car.

The four 2011 finalists were the Honda Fit EV, Mitsubishi i MiEV, Toyota RAV4 EV, and Volvo C30 DRIVe Electric.

2012 —Ford C-Max Energi plug-in hybrid.

The four 2012 finalists were the Tesla Model S and the BMW i3 electric cars, the Cadillac ELR plug-in hybrid, and the Mercedes-Benz B-Class F-Cell hydrogen fuel cell electric car. The winner was announced on January 26 at the 2012 Washington Auto Show.

== See also ==
- Green vehicle
- Green Car of the Year
- List of motor vehicle awards
