= Washington Auto Show =

Washington Auto Show Logo Mark

The Washington, D.C. Auto Show (WAS) is an annual local auto show held in Washington, D.C., at the Walter E. Washington Convention Center usually in late January. It is among the largest auto shows in the United States, trailing only the North American International Auto Show in Detroit (NAIAS), the LA Auto Show, the New York International Auto Show (NYIAS), and the Chicago Auto Show in size. It is sometimes also referred to as the D.C. Auto Show. The event has evolved to emphasize and showcase the latest innovations in sustainable automotive technologies. Since 2008 the winners of the Green Car Vision Award are announced during the show.

== Overview ==
Designated one of the nation's top five auto shows by the International Organization of Motor Vehicle Manufacturers, the Washington Auto Show includes the latest model cars and displays of historic vehicles. Often referred to as the "Public Policy Show" on the auto show circuit, the 10-day public show is preceded by two Public Policy Preview Days of special events and announcements for officials in government, industry and the media.

The Washington Auto Show is also the largest public show in Washington, D.C. On display are more than 700 new models from over 42 manufacturers.

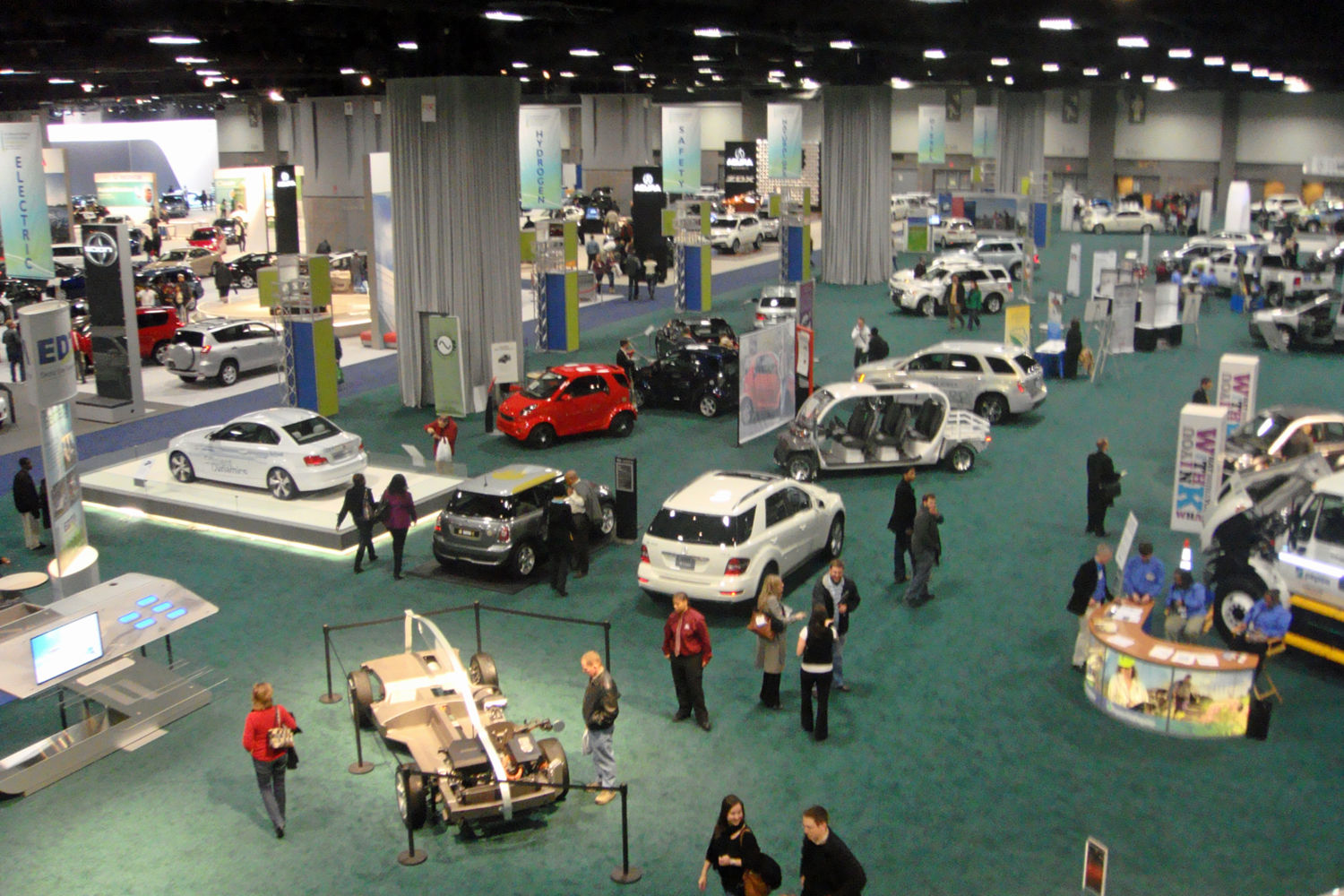
Advanced Technology Super Highway exhibition floor at the 2010 show

== History ==
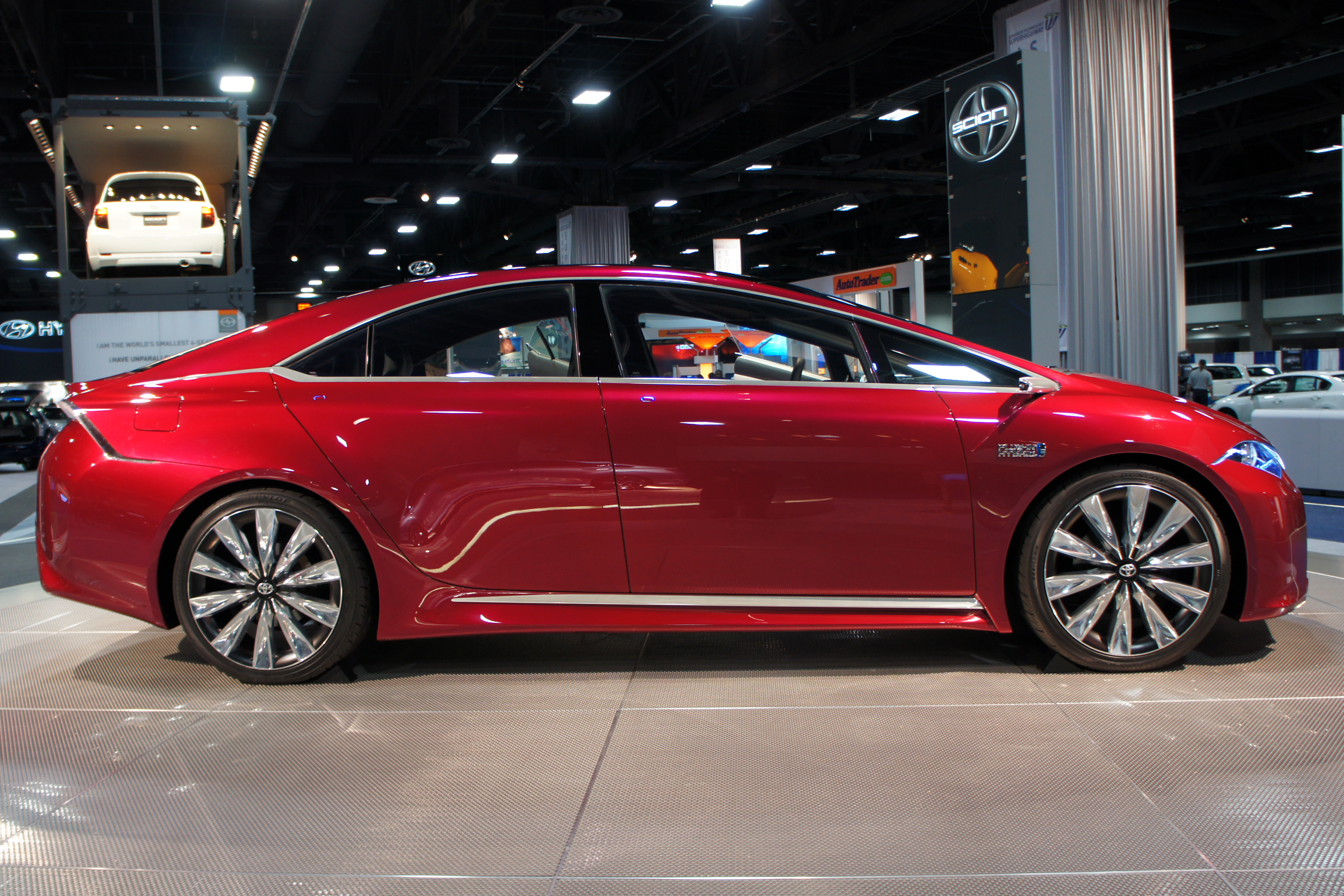
Toyota NS4 plug-in hybrid concept at the 2012 show.

In 1921, a group of 20 Washington-area car dealers and distributors planned the first show to sell the public on the advantages of the horseless carriage. Housed in a variety of area venues, the show was staged for 18 years in the National Guard D.C. Armory. The show has gone on hiatus twice – once for war and once due to poor economic conditions.

After a break in the 1970s, the Washington Convention Center and The Washington Auto Show opened together in early 1983. By this date, the auto show had grown to require every available foot of display space, covering nearly eight acres – almost four times the physical size of the Armory shows, with three times as many models.

In 1988, The Washington Auto Show began using the week between Christmas and New Year’s Day as its annual time frame, establishing its reputation as a family destination. The event was later moved to late January to coincide with Congress’ return from recess, enabling the show to capitalize on the business of Washington.

Year	Started	Finished	Notes	Ref
2008	Jan. 23	Jan. 27		
2009	Feb. 4	Feb. 8		
2010	Jan. 25	Jan. 31	Public Policy Days from January 25 to 26, and Public/Consumer Days from January 27 through 31.	
2011	Jan. 28	Feb. 6	The 2011 show was doubled in length, from five days to ten.	
2012	Jan. 27	Feb. 5		
2013	Feb. 1	Feb. 10		
2014	Jan. 23	Feb. 2		
2015	Jan. 23	Feb. 1	It attracted over 400,000 visitors over several days. The 2015 Keynote Speaker was Cadillac President Johan de Nysschen.	
2016	Jan. 22	Jan. 30		
