= Green Car Journal =

Magazine (motoring)

- The Green Car Journal’s 2010 cover, which featured the Green Car of the Year award winner, an Audi diesel. The car’s award was rescinded due to the later Volkswagen emissions scandal.
- Editor: Ron Cogan
- Categories: Automobile
- Frequency: Quarterly
- Founder: Ron Cogan, David A. Gautreau
- Founded: 1992
- Country: United States
- Website: http://greencarjournal.com/

Green Car Journal a monthly publication created in 1992, now published as an annual, focuses on green vehicles and environmentally friendly energy and technologies. The founder and editor is Ron Cogan. Co-founder and executive publisher through 1997 was David A. Gautreau (David A. Gautreau - The Control Room, established 1982). The magazine also hosts events, produces ride-and-drives of advanced and clean fuel vehicles, and conducts various outreach efforts to educate consumers about green vehicle choices.

In November 2004 the magazine's Spring 2004 edition won a silver medal for "Best Single Magazine Issue" from the International Automotive Media Awards, together with eight other awards for magazine writing.

== Sponsored awards ==
The Green Car of the Year and the Green Car Vision Award are annual awards granted by the Green Car Journal.
