= Chevrolet Volt (first generation) =

American hybrid car (2010–2015)

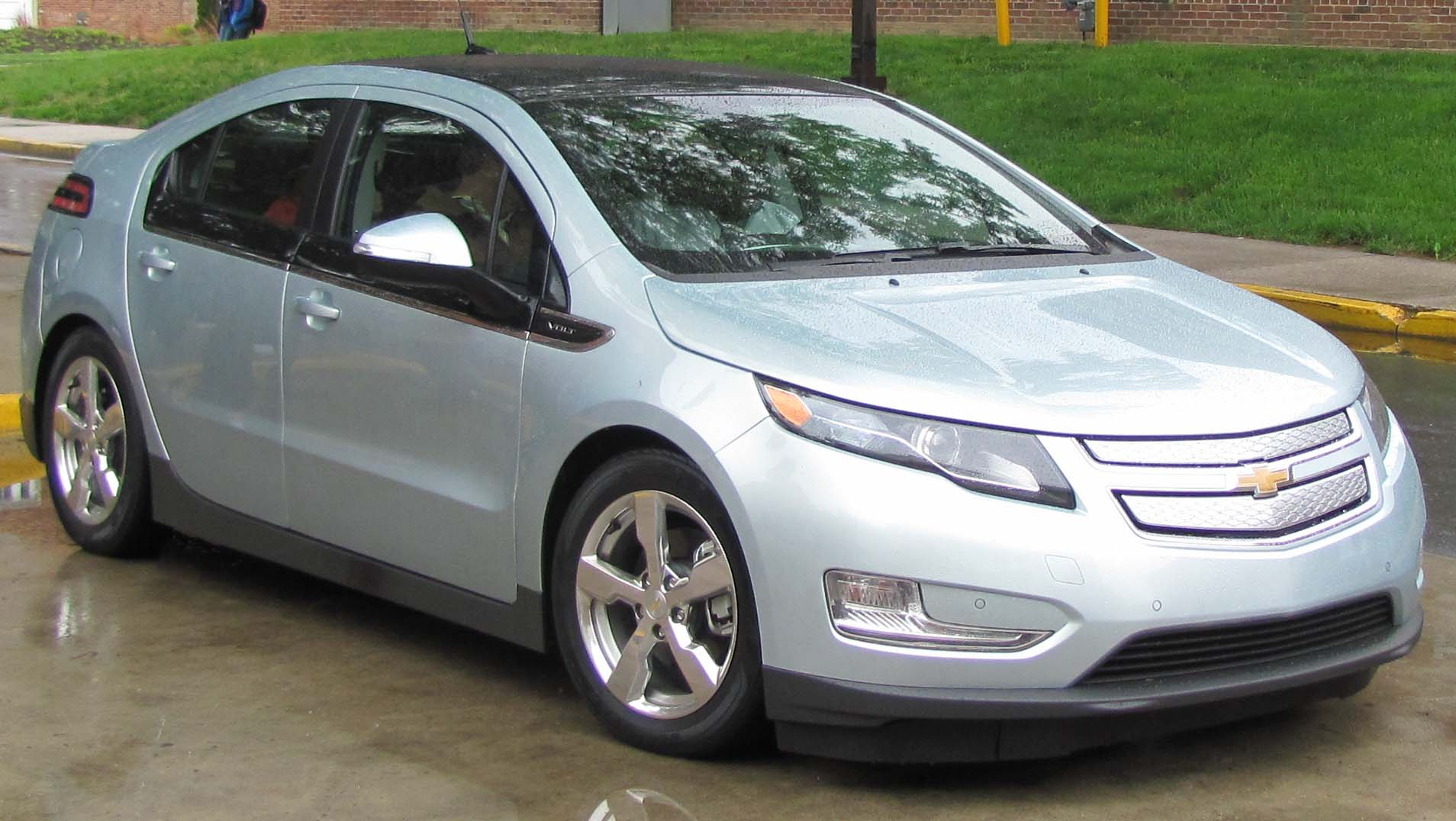

Overview
- Manufacturer: General Motors
- Also called: Holden Volt; Opel Ampera; Vauxhall Ampera
- Production: November 2010 – May 2015
- Model years: 2011–2015
- Assembly: United States: Detroit, Michigan (Detroit/Hamtramck Assembly)
- Designer: Jelani Aliyu concept car, Bob Boniface production car

Body and chassis
- Class: Compact car
- Body style: 5-door liftback
- Layout: Front-engine, front-wheel drive
- Platform: GM Delta II
- Related: Cadillac ELR

Powertrain
- Engine: 1,398 cc (1.4 L) EcoFLEX A14XFL (LUU) I4 (gasoline)
- Electric motor: 2x permanent magnet motors (Note: The system of motors comprises one 111 kW (149 hp) unit and a less powerful 55 kW (74 hp) unit.)
- Transmission: 1-speed Voltec 4ET50 Multi-mode electric transaxle
- Hybrid drivetrain: E-REV / (GM Voltec)
- Battery: 16.0 kWh lithium-ion (2011–2012); 16.5 kWh lithium-ion (2013–2014); 17.1 kWh lithium-ion (2015)
- Range: 610 km (380 miles) (EPA)
- Electric range: 56 km (35 miles) (EPA; 2011–2012); 61 km (38 miles) (EPA; 2013–2015)
- Plug-in charging: SAE J1772: 3.3 kW 100–240 VAC onboard charger

Dimensions
- Wheelbase: 2,685 mm (105.7 in)
- Length: 4,498 mm (177.1 in)
- Width: 1,788 mm (70.4 in)
- Height: 1,438 mm (56.6 in)
- Curb weight: Volt: 1,691–1,721 kg (3,729–3,794 lb); Ampera: 1,686–1,732 kg (3,717–3,818 lb)

Chronology
- Successor: Chevrolet Volt (second generation)

The Chevrolet Volt is an electric car with a gasoline range extender generator that was produced by General Motors and marketed by Chevrolet. The first generation of the Chevrolet Volt, it was manufactured at the Detroit facility until it was succeeded by the second and final generation of the Volt in 2015. It is a five-door liftback with a range-extending generator.

In 2006, under the direction of GM Vice President Robert Lutz, General Motors began development of a car to rebuild their "environmentally-friendly, technologically advanced" image following the setback of the unsuccessful EV1 program. The project sought to establish a new family of common powertrain components for electric propulsion, known as the "E-Flex Systems" or "Voltec". This powertrain was versatile enough to accommodate various electricity-generating systems, such as gasoline, diesel, ethanol, or fuel cell-powered engines. A lithium-ion battery pack with a 16 kWh energy storage capacity was selected to provide a target all-electric range of 65 km (40 miles). The Volt concept car became the first application of the E-Flex propulsion system. This drivetrain comprises an electric motor, a lithium-ion battery pack, and a genset with a small combustion engine.

Official series manufacture of the car at the Detroit/Hamtramck Assembly began on November 30, 2010. In place of the "Chevrolet Volt" nameplate, the Australasian markets received the Holden Volt, which was produced between 2012 and 2015. In numerous European markets, the Opel/Vauxhall Ampera was introduced, featuring various visual modifications to differentiate it from the Volt. Nevertheless, the Chevrolet Volt continued to be sold in Europe, albeit in lower volumes.

The Chevrolet Volt functions as a battery electric vehicle until its battery capacity diminishes to a predefined threshold from full charge. At that point, its internal combustion engine activates an electric generator to extend the vehicle's range as necessary. During high-speed operation on gasoline, the engine may be mechanically linked to a generator set through a clutch, improving efficiency by 10% to 15%. The Volt's regenerative braking system also contributes to on-board electricity generation.

== Terminology ==
According to the Society of Automotive Engineers' (SAE) definition of a hybrid vehicle, they are characterized by the presence of "two or more energy storage systems, both of which must provide propulsion power, either together or independently". General Motors has refrained from using the term "hybrid" in reference to its Voltec designs, even following the disclosure that, in certain instances, the combustion engine offers assistance at very high speeds. This contribution from the gas engine is limited to high-speed scenarios, as during normal driving, there is no such facilitation, and the vehicle operates solely on electric power. General Motors instead describes the Volt as an electric vehicle equipped with a "range extender" gasoline-powered internal combustion engine (ICE) functioning as a genset and calls it an "extended range electric vehicle". In a January 2011 interview, Pamela Fletcher, the Global Chief Engineer of the Chevrolet Volt, described it as "an electric car with extended range".

The Society of Automotive Engineers (SAE) states that the Volt qualifies as a plug-in hybrid vehicle due to its combination of an internal combustion engine, two electric motors, and a battery capable of accepting off-board energy. Functioning as a plug-in hybrid, the Volt can operate as a purely electric vehicle for the first 25 to 50 miles (40 to 80 km) in charge-depleting mode. When the battery capacity drops below a pre-established threshold from full charge, the vehicle enters charge-sustaining mode. In this mode, the Volt's control system selects the most efficient combination of its two electric motors—one powered by the propulsion system battery pack reserve and one by the combustion generator—to enhance performance and boost high-speed efficiency.

== Design and development ==
=== Concept vehicle ===
"When the car's cover was removed, I remember thinking I really didn't care what sort of power source might be inside this compact sedan. I liked the car's design and hoped it would find its way to the road as quickly as possible. But the big news wasn't the package, it was the powertrain. This stunning vehicle was designed to showcase a technology that General Motors promised would be a significant step in weaning America and its motorists from their dependence on imported oil."

— Robert Lutz (2010)

The Chevrolet Volt concept car debuted at the January 2007 North American International Auto Show. The Volt concept featured a four-door layout with a rear liftgate and seating for four. This design contrasted with the former EV1 which seated two to minimize weight and accommodate its lead-acid battery pack. Top speed was increased on the Volt, from the electronically limited 80 miles per hour (130 km/h) to 101 miles per hour (160 km/h). Additionally, there was a reduction in battery size, from approximately 10.6 cubic feet (300 L) in volume, to 3.5 cubic feet (100 L) in the Volt.

Led by then-vice-chairman for global product development at General Motors Robert Lutz, the Volt project sought to emulate the success of the Toyota Prius and become a leapfrog product like Apple's iPod. Inspired by the Tesla Roadster sports car and the rapid advances in lithium-ion battery technology, Lutz advocated for the development of a new car after the 2006 Detroit Auto Show despite internal opposition stemming from the billion-dollar loss experienced in the 1990s with the EV1. Lutz's initial idea was to develop an all-electric car. Still, when Jon Lauckner, General Motors vice president for global program management, briefly sketched out the powertrain layout, estimated the vehicle weight and battery requirements, he decided a range extender design was more appropriate. He convinced Lutz that adopting a smaller battery pack and a small combustion engine to drive a generator, serving as a range-extender, would address concerns related to expensive batteries, range anxiety, and the lack of public charging infrastructure, thereby circumventing the limitations observed in the EV1 program.

The majority of the Volt's initial design parameters defined for the development of the concept car then referred to as the "iCar" in homage to the iPod, were kept throughout the process up to the final production version. A major design parameter was a target of 40 miles (64 km) for the all-electric range to keep the battery size compact and lower costs. This decision was largely based on research which indicated that 78% of daily commuters in the United States travel 40 miles or less. This target range allows drivers to effectively use its zero-emissions system, assuming that charging takes place at home overnight. To meet these requirements, a lithium-ion battery pack with a 16 kWh energy storage capacity was selected. The choice took into account that the battery would be used until the state of charge reached 30%, ensuring operational performance across various conditions and minimizing the battery degradation, achieving a minimum ten-year lifespan. The initial target range for the gasoline engine/generator was set between 250 and 300 miles (400 and 480 km), and the vehicle had to accommodate four or five passengers, conforming to the standards of a family car.

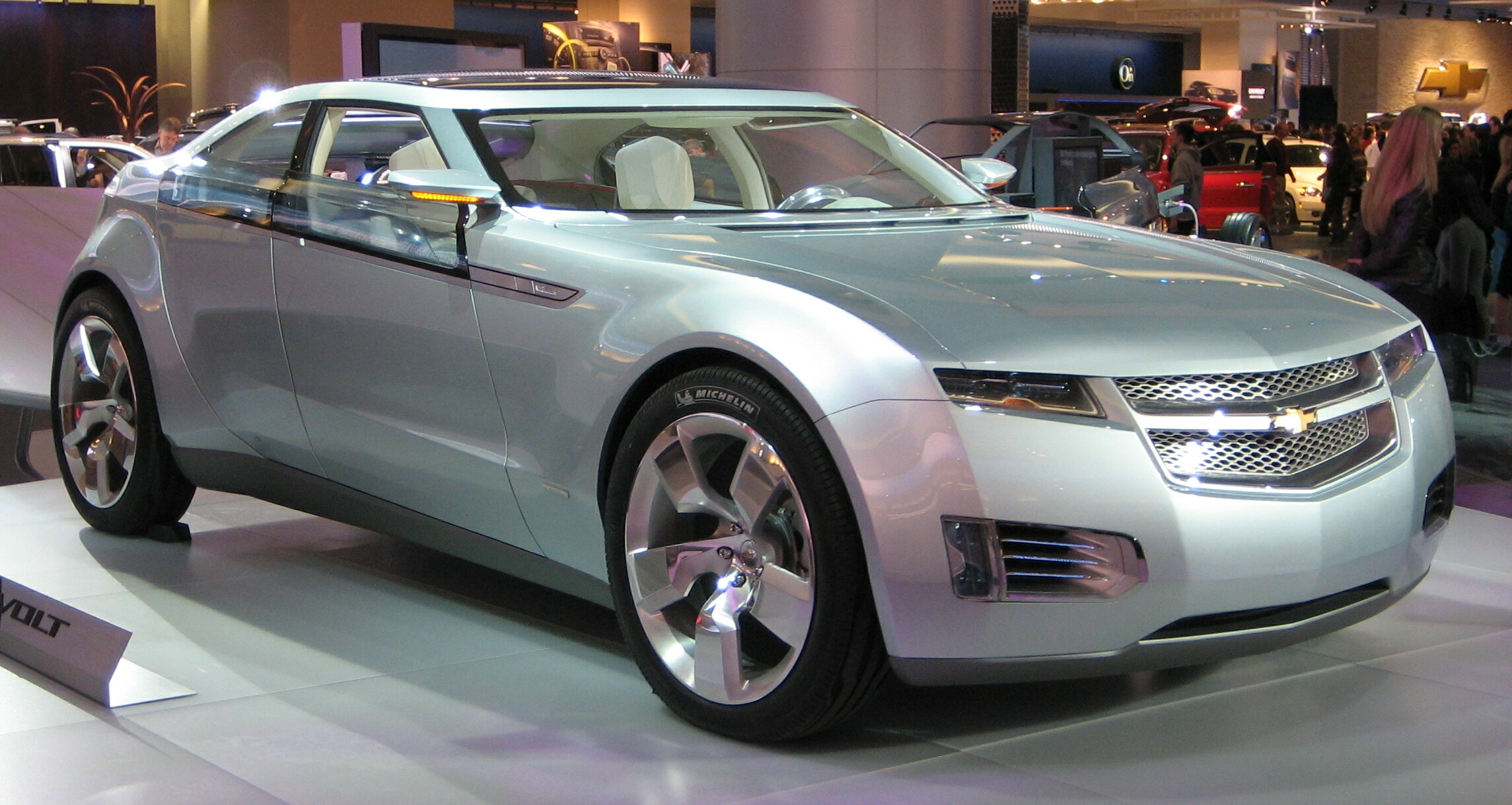
The Chevrolet Volt concept car was unveiled at the January 2007 North American International Auto Show.

A major design decision was to develop the concept car based on a new family of common powertrain components for electric propulsion, which initially was called the E-Flex Systems, (Note: "E" stands for electric drive, and "Flex" for the various sources of electricity.) but was later renamed Voltec drive system. This powertrain was designed to establish a standardized framework for various components within potential future electrically driven vehicles, facilitating the integration of multiple interchangeable electricity-generating systems. The E-Flex powertrain was designed to configure vehicles for battery electric, fuel cell-powered, or alternative energy sources for onboard electricity generation, including engine-generator sets (genset) powered by gasoline, diesel, biodiesel, ethanol fuel (E100), or flex-fuel (E85). The incorporation of regenerative braking further improves the onboard electricity.

In October 2006, General Motors selected the E-Flex powertrain as the new propulsion architecture. They chose the name Volt. The Volt concept car served as the first application of the E-Flex drive system with a combination of an electric motor—similar to that of the one used in the Chevrolet Equinox Fuel Cell—a 16 kWh (58 MJ) lithium-ion battery pack with 136 kW of peak power, and a genset consisting of a small 1.0 L, 3-cylinder turbocharged flex-fuel capable engine linked to a 53 kW (71 hp) generator. General Motors referred to this genset as an electric vehicle (EV) range extender. The vehicle is synergized by an electric motor with a peak output of 120 kW (160 hp) delivering 236 lb⋅ft (320 N⋅m) of motoring torque. Various advanced materials from GE Automotive Plastics were incorporated, effectively reducing vehicle weight by up to 50%.

With a fuel capacity of 12 US gal (45 L; 10.0 imp gal), which provides the vehicle with a total driving range of approximately 640 mi (1,030 km), the car combines a gasoline fuel efficiency of approximately 50 mpg_{‑US} (4.7 L/100 km; 60 mpg_{‑imp}) and an all-electric range of 40 mi (64 km). General Motors estimated that a daily drive of 60 mi (97 km), coupled with an overnight recharge to support the first 40 all-electric miles, would result in an effective gasoline fuel economy of 150 mpg_{‑US} (1.6 L/100 km; 180 mpg_{‑imp}). General Motors underscored the potential to further reduce dependence on imported oil by using E85 ethanol instead of gasoline to power the onboard generator engine. General Motors also noted that actual production of the Volt depended on advancements in battery development, as the required rechargeable batteries needed to make the Volt a viable vehicle did not exist in the market and were yet to be developed. The prototype vehicle is propelled by a pair of standard 12-volt conventional car batteries, which provides the vehicle with a sufficient amount of energy to operate at low speeds while stationary.

Lutz initially claimed that the Volt was expected to sell for around US$30,000, based on the cost of a conventional car of that size with a four-cylinder engine. Additionally, an extra US$8,000 was estimated for the lithium-ion battery. Engineers faced cost escalation when they realized that the Volt could not share components from General Motors' compact car platform such as power steering, power brake, and air-conditioning compressor, each of which was driven by a belt running off the engine. This, coupled with the inclusion of a compact 110 kW (150 hp) electric motor and specialized microprocessors to control energy flow to the motor, led to a base price of around US$40,000.

=== Production model ===
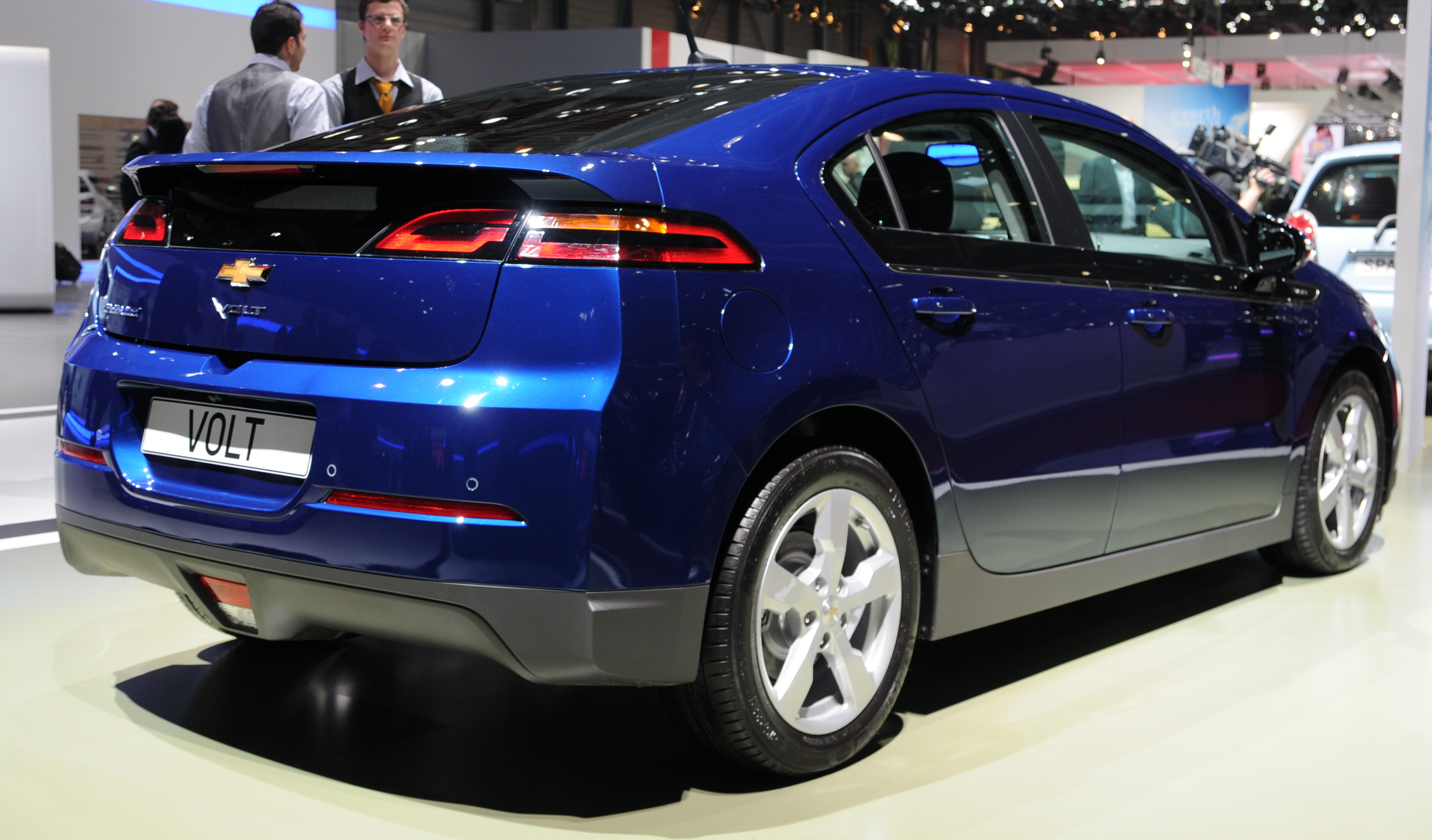
2013 Chevrolet Volt at the Geneva Motor Show.

General Motors stated on December 7, 2009, that US$700 million would be spent at eight Michigan facilities to prepare the Chevrolet Volt for production. GM officials provided a comprehensive overview of their investment strategy for the Chevrolet Volt during a presentation at the assembly plant situated on the border between Detroit and Hamtramck. The plant underwent a significant upgrade amounting to US$336 million, encompassing the installation of new machinery and equipment. GM's investment in Volt-related initiatives extends to several key projects, including the allocation of US$202 million for a new plant in Flint dedicated to manufacturing engine generators; US$43 million for a plant in the Detroit suburb of Brownstown Township responsible for battery packs; US$37 million for the Bay City powertrain plant; and US$27 million for the GM Tech Center housing the Volt's battery laboratory.

After the concept was put into the pipeline for production, General Motors began searching for a partner to develop the Volt's lithium-ion battery pack. They scrutinized about 25 battery cell chemistries and constructions from around 24 lithium-ion battery manufacturers globally. In June 2007, Compact Power (CPI) and Continental Automotive Systems were selected due to their more promising battery cell technologies. CPI uses a lithium manganese oxide (LiMn_{2}O_{4}) cell manufactured by its parent company, LG Chemical. In contrast Continental Automotive Systems uses lithium iron phosphate-based cylindrical cells developed by A123Systems. By the end of October 2007, CPI had delivered their finalized prototype battery packs, while A123 had delivered theirs by January 2008. GM's testing was conducted at the laboratory established for the GM EV1 program. The battery packs incorporated monitoring systems designed to keep the batteries cool and operating at an optimal capacity across the diverse range of ambient temperatures. To ensure the battery pack's longevity over a 10-year and 150,000 mi (240,000 km) warranty, the Volt team decided to use only half of the 16 kWh capacity to minimize the rate of capacity degradation, limiting the state of charge (SoC) to 80% of capacity and never depleting the battery below 30%. GM also anticipated the battery to withstand 5,000 full discharges without losing more than 10% of its charge capacity.

In April 2008, General Motors began extensive testing on its batteries. Over the subsequent two years, the engineering team subjected the battery packs to the equivalent of 150,000 real-world miles (240,000 km) and 10 years of usage. The project involved extensive battery assessments and validation testing at GM's laboratory in Warren, Michigan. This facility has 160 test channels and 42 thermal chambers that subject the batteries to real-world driving conditions and varying temperatures. It features 32 battery cyclers, dubbed "treadmills", designed for repetitive pack depletion and charging. Engineers inspected packs for shorts, corrosion, and crash impact, conducting various real-life scenarios involving flooding, crushing, and penetration. The durability assessment included exposure to various extreme ambient conditions, including a shaker table to replicate potholes and a thermal chamber, to simulate real-world temperatures varying from 116 °F (47 °C) to −40 °F (−40 °C). In April 2008, the lithium-ion battery pack was integrated into Chevrolet Malibus equipped with the Volt powertrain, serving as test mules for further real-world assessments.

In October 2008, GM selected CPI (LG Chemical) to provide the battery systems for the first production version of the Volt. In July 2008, the company disclosed that a 1.4-liter 4-cylinder engine would serve as the range extender, with plans for production in Flint, Michigan. In April 2009, General Motors allowed journalists to test the Volt powertrain without the range-extending generator in Chevrolet Cruze (J300) sedans used as test mules at the GM Technical Center in Warren, Michigan. After the tests, the prototypes, with the packs integrated into the cars, underwent similar assessments while on the road. The first pre-production test car, based on the final design, were assembled in June 2009 in Warren, Michigan. By October 2009, 80 pre-production Volts had been built and subjected to testing under various conditions. On March 31, 2010, the first factory-built example rolled off the assembly line at the Detroit Hamtramck Assembly Plant, which served as a test for the production line and quality control purposes, evaluating both tooling and pre-production vehicles before series production commenced.

The manufacture-ready vehicle was officially unveiled on the morning of September 16, 2008, as part of the General Motors centennial celebration at the Wintergarden headquarters in Detroit. The production model differed greatly in design from the original concept car. The use of General Motors' new global compact vehicle platform, Delta II, shared with the 2010 model year Chevrolet Cruze, was to keep costs reasonable, for "both the company and customers", as described by design director Bob Boniface. Another significant difference from the concept car is the seating, as the production Volt accommodates four passengers in place of five. This adjustment was necessitated by the heightened central tunnel, extending from the front console to the rear seat, which houses the vehicle's T-shaped battery pack.

On November 30, 2010, General Motors hosted a ceremony at its Detroit Hamtramck Assembly Plant to unveil the first Chevrolet Volt produced on the assembly line. The first Volt designated for retail distribution was slated for exhibition at GM's Heritage Center museum in Sterling Heights, Michigan. The second unit was placed up for public auction, with an opening bid of US$50,000. The auction was won by Rick Hendrick, who secured the vehicle for US$225,000. The proceeds from this auction were directed towards supporting mathematics and science educations in Detroit through the Detroit Public Schools Foundation. The first delivery in the United States took place on December 15, 2010 to retired pilot Jeffrey Kaffee. Canadian deliveries commenced in September 2011. The first deliveries of the Chevrolet Volt in Europe took place in November 2011. The Opel Ampera, a rebadged Volt with stylistic modifications, became available to retail customers in Europe in February 2012. Deliveries of the right-hand drive Vauxhall Ampera for the United Kingdom began in May 2012. The Holden Volt was released for the Australian market in December 2012.

=== Design ===
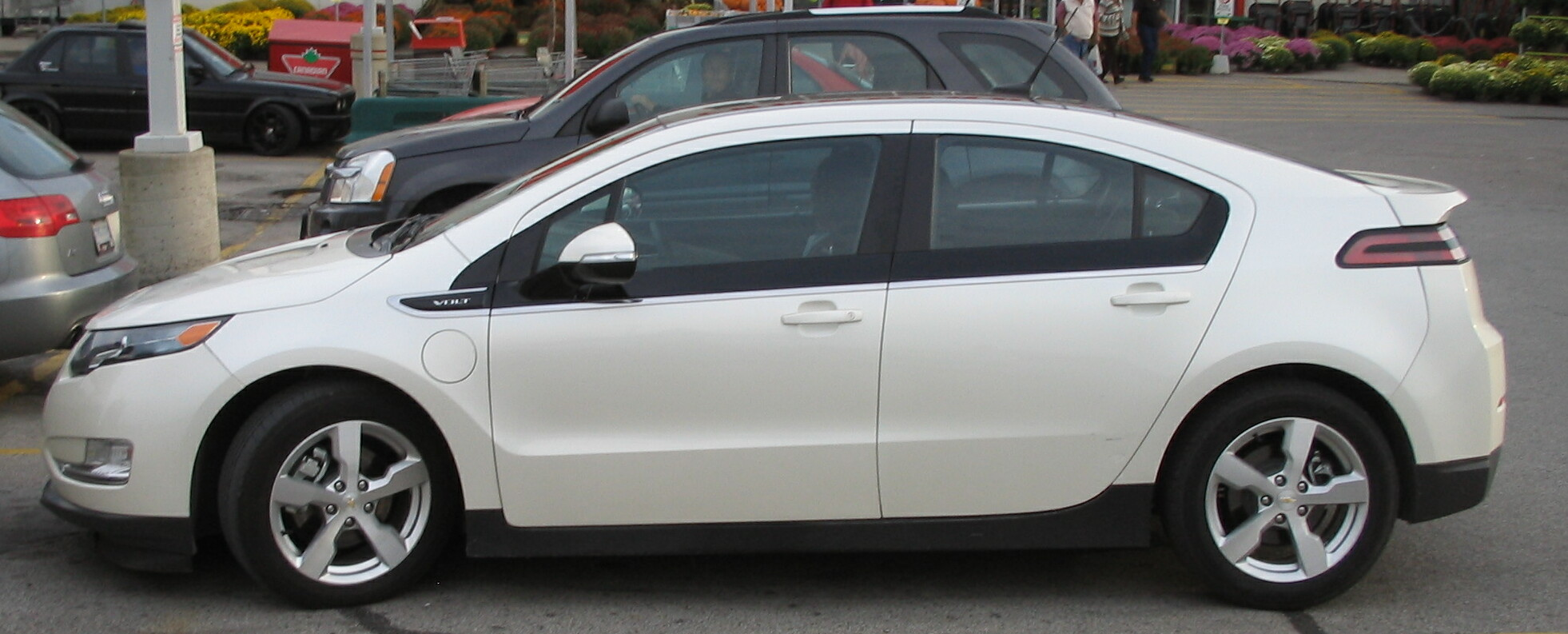
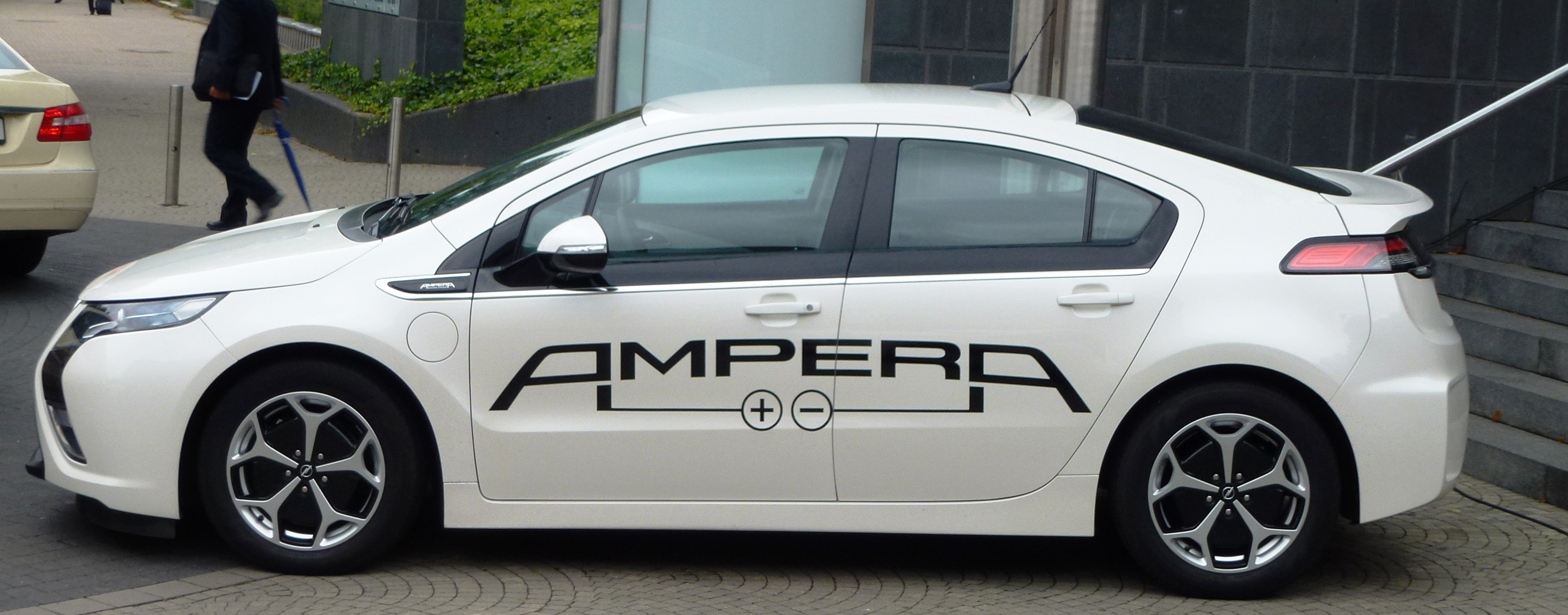
Volt (top) and Ampera (bottom) common elements include doors, fenders, interiors, and the hood panel. However, the front and rear bumpers are unique to each car.

Designers at General Motors sought to make the Volt's design as conventional as possible. Engineers were dedicated to minimizing aerodynamic drag, but they intentionally avoided incorporating the distinctive roofline and silhouette of the second-generation Prius, considering it synonymous with the 'hybrid' aesthetic. The Volt and Ampera share a common 2,685 mm (105.7 in) wheelbase and are comparable in length to the Opel Astra J and Cruze J300, with which they also share their fundamental body structures. While front and rear bumpers are unique to each car, the doors, fenders, hood panels, and interiors are interchangeable. In adopting a more general style, Opel had to forgo distinctive design elements including the "side blade" and "wing" motifs. However, front and rear bumper assemblies are unique to each car, and thus the team specifically focused on these areas. Bob Boniface served as the design director for the concept and production iterations of the Volt.

In April 2007, Ed Welburn, vice president of global design, established an E-Flex studio in Detroit, with Boniface at the helm. The primary objective of this studio was to focus on the body development of the Volt, simultaneously while working on the design of future electrified vehicles. The E-Flex group expanded to include 50 designers and engineers who dedicated more than a year of aerodynamic development.

When the Volt was approved for production, I decided we needed a dedicated mix of designers and engineers from the show-car team, working together with people from vehicle aerodynamics and the production side, and they needed their own creative space.

— Edward T. Welburn

Necessary aerodynamic adjustments were implemented to reduce the concept car's high drag coefficient of 0.43 C_{d} down to 0.28 C_{d}; although this figure is still higher than that of the Toyota Prius' 0.25. Boniface and his team dedicated approximately 500 hours (21 days) to wind tunnel development. As intended, the resultant design featured a more conventional design, incorporating a taller greenhouse and departing from the Camaro-like one seen in the concept. However, more significant aerodynamic enhancements were evident at the corners. The leading edges at the front fenders were rounded to create consistent laminar airflow along the car's sides. The production model's front fascia features a flush design and the frontal air intake is redirected through a horizontal opening below the grille instead of the grille itself. Boniface claimed that specific attention was given to the rear spoiler, rocker panels, and A- and C-pillars to minimize turbulence over the roof and reduce overall drag.

== Specifications ==
=== Drivetrain ===
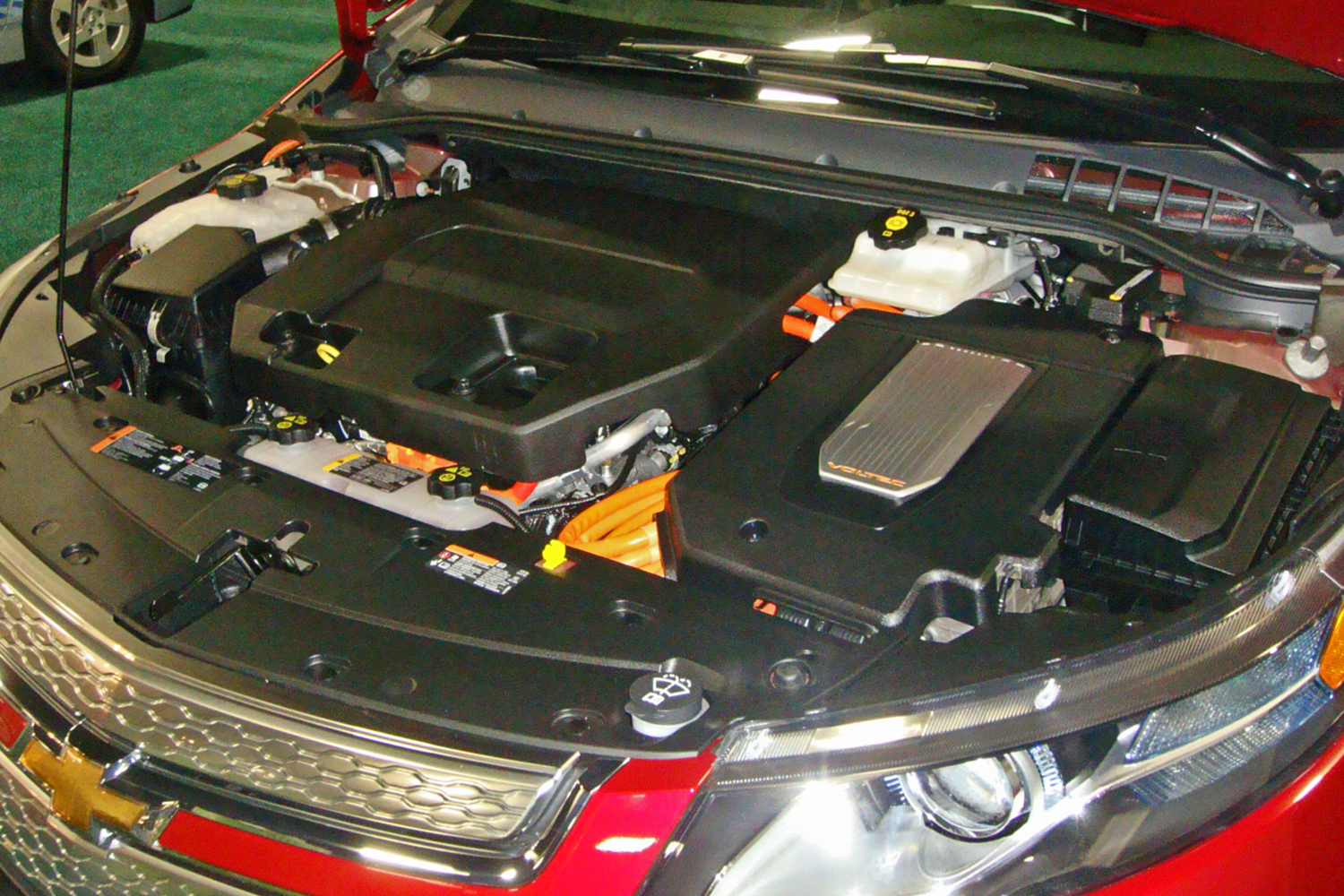
Right side: power inverter on top of the electric motor used for traction; left side: the 1.4 L gasoline engine used as a generator to keep the battery at minimum charge.

The 2011 Chevrolet Volt featured a 16 kWh / 45 A·h (10.4 kWh usable) lithium-ion battery pack. It can be charged by connecting the car to a 120–240 VAC residential electrical outlet using the provided SAE J1772-compliant charging cord. The Volt is powered by an electric motor that has a peak output of 111 kW (149 hp) delivering 273 lb⋅ft (370 N⋅m) of torque. Capacity of the battery pack was increased to 16.5 kWh (10.9 kWh usable) for 2013 models, which enhanced its all-electric range from 35 to 38 mi (56 to 61 km). Upgrades for 2015 models included a larger battery capacity of 17.1 kWh.

While driving, when the Volt's battery level diminishes to a predetermined threshold from full charge, a compact naturally aspirated 1.4-liter 4-cylinder gasoline fueled internal combustion engine (Opel's Family 0) with approximately 80 hp (60 kW), powers a 55 kW generator to extend the Volt's range. The vehicle also has a regenerative braking system. The electrical power from the generator is sent primarily to the electric motor, with the excess going to the batteries, depending on the state of charge (SOC) of the battery pack and the power demanded at the wheels.

The drivetrain enables the Volt to operate as a pure battery electric vehicle until its battery capacity has been depleted to a defined level. At this time, it functions as a series hybrid, where the gasoline engine propels the generator, maintaining the battery at a minimum charge level and supplying power to the electric motors. The full charge of the battery is exclusively replenished by connecting it to the electrical grid. While in this series mode at higher speeds and loads, (typically above 30 miles per hour (48 km/h) at light to moderate loads) the gasoline engine can engage mechanically to the output from the transmission and assist both electric motors in driving the wheels, in which case the Volt operates as a power-split or series-parallel hybrid. After its all-electric range has been depleted, at speeds between 30 and 70 miles per hour (48 and 113 km/h), the Volt is programmed to select the most efficient drive mode, which improves performance and boosts high-speed efficiency by 10% to 15%.

While operating modes are switched automatically, the Volt allows three distinct drive options available to the driver: normal, sport, and mountain. The mountain mode, which is expected to be required only under unusual power demand conditions, increases minimum battery state of charge (SOC) to around 45%, thus maintaining performance on steep and long grades. However, the higher power generation rate in this mode results in increased engine noise. In sport mode, the engine operates at a higher RPM, providing a more responsive reaction to the throttle pedal. Additionally, the Ampera introduces a functionality known as "City Mode" or "battery hold", allowing drivers to conserve energy stored in the battery for urban travel or restricted zones. This feature was introduced to the 2013 model year Volt and is known as "Hold".

=== Battery ===
The lithium-ion battery pack in the 2011 Volt weighs 435 pounds (197 kg) and comprises 288 cells organized into nine modules. Pairs of lithium-ion cells are secured within plastic frames, which sandwich an aluminum cooling fin. The design and construction of this aluminum plate were crucial to maintaining a consistent temperature distribution, preventing the occurrence of hot or cool spots across the flat, rectangular cells. The battery pack is equipped with its cooling circuit that resembles the engine cooling system.

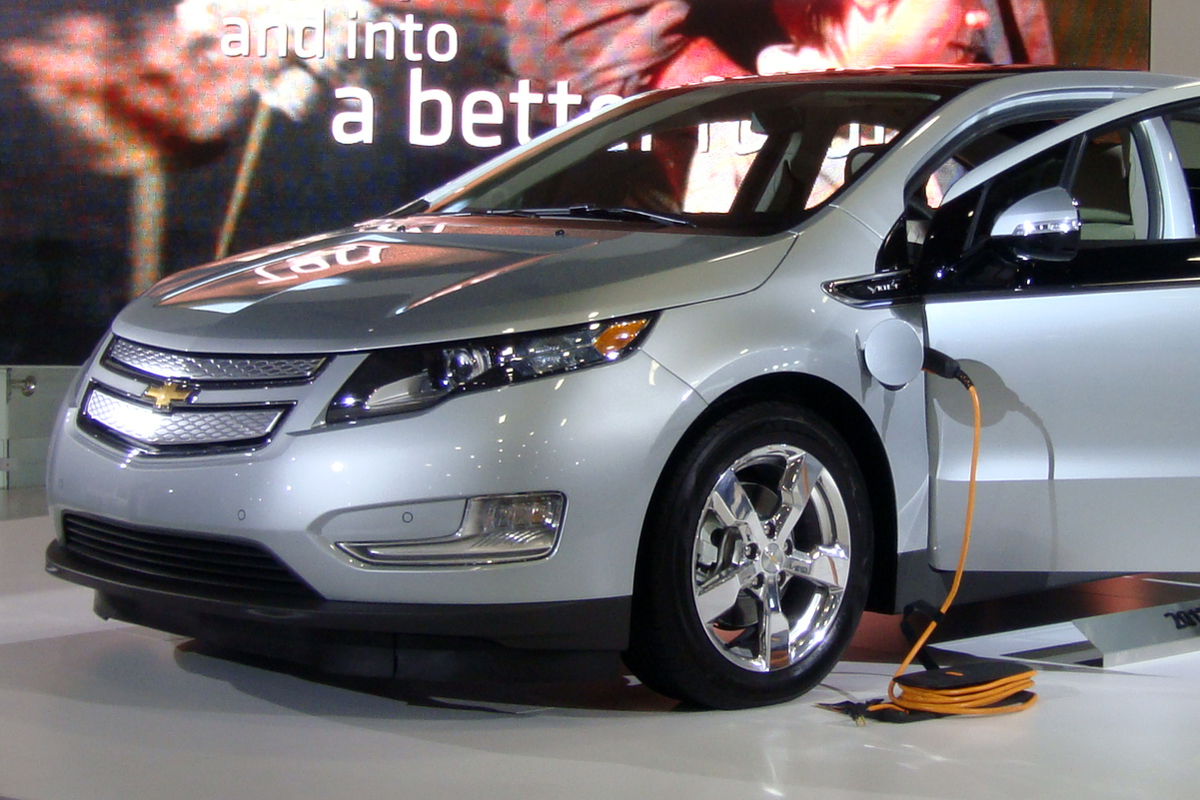
Inlet for the electrical charger in the left side of the Chevrolet Volt with the manufacturer's provided charging cord.

For the 2011 and 2012 model years, the 16 kWh battery was controlled by the energy management system to use only 10.3 kWh, maximizing the life of the pack. Consequently, the battery is prevented from reaching full charge or complete depletion, as the embedded software confines its operation within a specific State of Charge (SoC) window set at 65%. Once this threshold is reached, the engine engages and maintains the charge near the lower level. The minimum SoC varies depending on operating conditions. In situations where the vehicle requires increased power, such as during mountain mode, the lower threshold of the states of charge (SoC) is increased to 45% to ensure an ample supply of power. The battery capacity was increased to 16.5 kWh for the 2013 model year, and the SoC window was increased to use 10.8 kWh of the total battery energy, and the buffer to ensure battery life longevity. These adjustments extend the Volt's all-electric range, albeit with a marginal increase in charging duration. General Motors achieved improved battery performance and durability by making subtle alterations to the material composition of the battery cell chemistry.

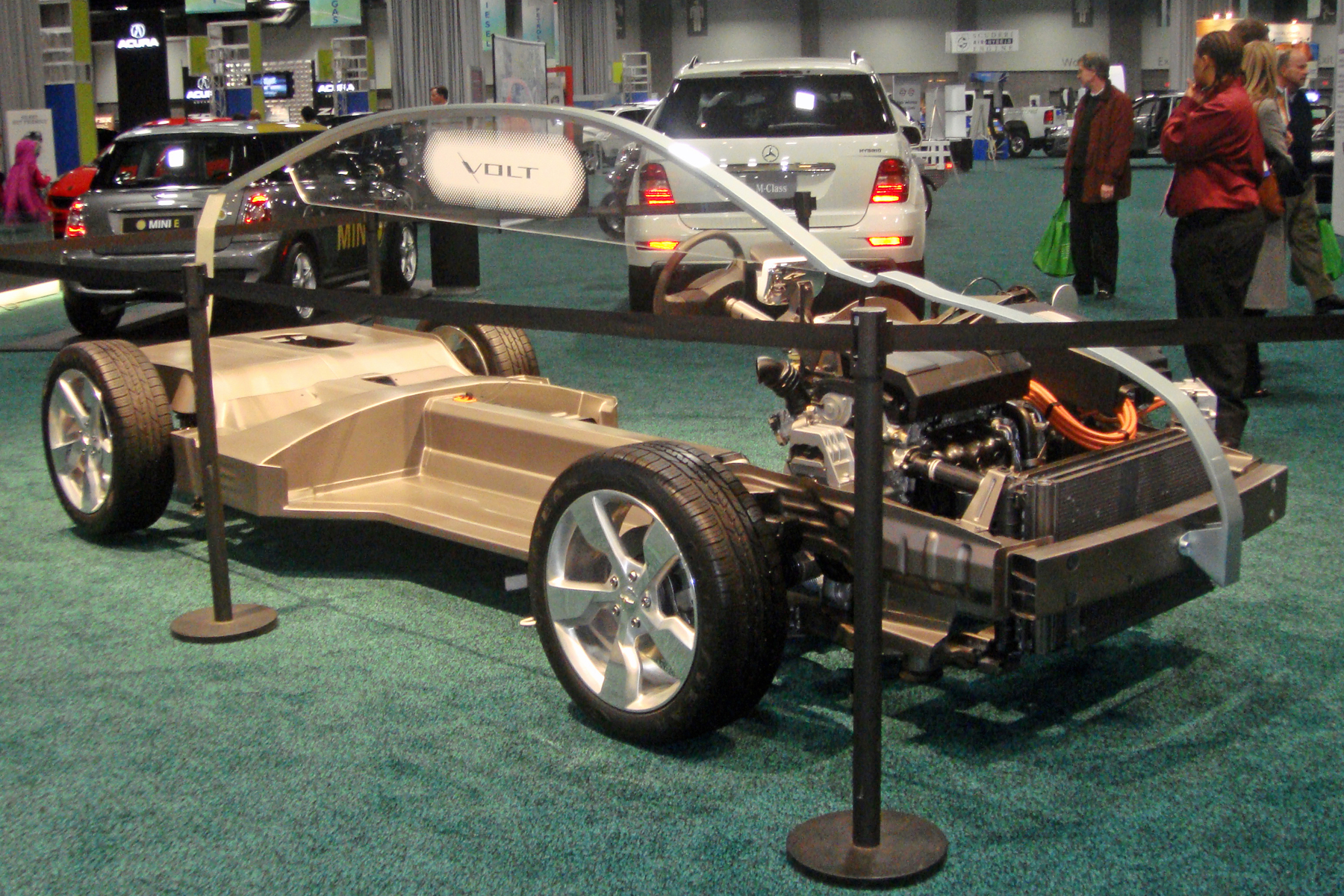
Powertrain cut-away of the Volt revealing both of its engines and the underfloor T-shape tunnel where the battery pack is located.

Despite the energy of each battery pack being nearly identical (±0.5 kWh), the Volt's battery pack is over 70% lighter than the EV1's original 1,310 lb (590 kg) 16.5 kWh AC Delco lead-acid battery pack, primarily because of its higher specific energy lithium-ion batteries. Li-ion batteries were expected to become less expensive as economies of scale take effect. General Motors provides an eight-year or 100,000 miles (160,000 km) warranty for the Volt's battery, covering all 161 battery components. The Volt's battery management system runs more than 500 diagnostics at 10 times per second, allowing it to keep track of the Volt's battery pack in real-time, 85% of which ensure the battery pack is operating safely and 15% monitor battery performance and life.

The Volt employs the J1772 charging plug, a standard connector for electric cars in North America. Depending on in-car settings, a full charge takes from approximately 10 hours (with the 12 A setting) to as much as 14 hours (8 A setting) from a standard North American 120-volt receptacle. From a 240-volt source, a full charge takes around 4 hours.

=== Safety ===
ANCAP test results* Holden Volt all variants (2012)
Test	Score
Overall	5 /5 stars
Frontal offset	13.56/16
Side impact	16/16
Pole	2/2
Seat belt reminders	3/3
Whiplash protection	Good
Pedestrian protection	Marginal
Electronic stability control	Standard

== Production and markets ==
=== North America ===
Assembly of the Volt was assigned to Detroit/Hamtramck Assembly plant following the UAW–GM conclusion of the 2007 contract negotiations. For the initial production phase, the gasoline engine was sourced from the Opel engine plant in Aspern, Austria. In November 2010, General Motors began investing US$138.3 million at its engine operations plant in Flint, Michigan, to support increased production of the Ecotec 1.4-liter engine used in the Chevrolet Cruze, the upcoming 2012 Chevrolet Sonic, and the variant used in the Chevrolet Volt. The Flint plant was projected to commence production at a rate of 400 engines per day in early 2011, escalating to 800 engines daily by late 2011, and ultimately reaching a capacity of 1,200 engines per day by late 2012. In May 2011, an additional investment of US$84 million at the Flint plant was decided upon by General Motors to further increase the production capacity of the 1.4-liter engine.

In 2010, General Motors initially planned to produce 10,000 Volts in the calendar year 2011 and 45,000 units for 2012, surpassing the initially announced 30,000 units. In May 2011, the production targets were revised upwards, with Volt and Ampera production capacity increased to 16,000 units in 2011, including 3,500 units for export, 2,500 demonstration units for U.S. dealerships, and the remainder for U.S. sales. However, in November 2011 GM's sales chief announced that they would not meet its sales goal of 10,000 vehicles in 2011. Out of the 2012 production, General Motors anticipated the production of 10,000 Amperas for sale in Europe, with 6,000 allocated for Opel and 4,000 for Vauxhall in the UK. Additionally, 2,000 Volts were designated for the region. However, by early 2012, GM abandoned its sales target to deliver 45,000 Volts in the U.S. and instead announced that production in 2012 would be contingent on demand. By March 2012, the Volt plant had a global production capacity of 60,000 vehicles per year. The battery cells for the Volt are manufactured by LG Chem in South Korea and then transported to the U.S., where the battery packs are assembled at a specialized facility in Brownstown Charter Township, Michigan, owned and operated by General Motors.

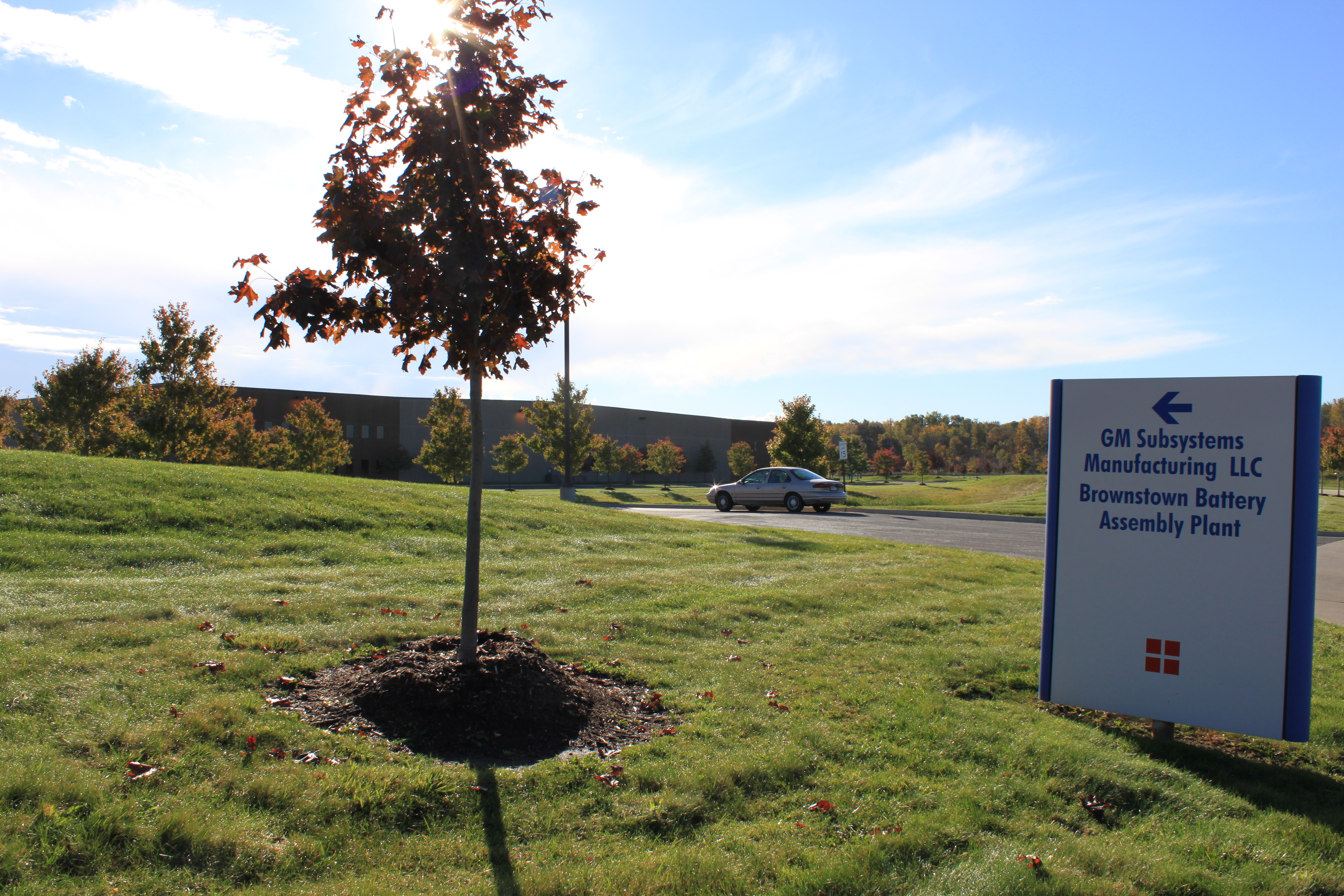
Brownstown Assembly Plant, where the LG Chemical-manufactured batteries are assembled.

In mid-June 2011, General Motors (GM) temporarily halted production at the Detroit/Hamtramck Assembly plant for approximately one month. This pause was undertaken to implement important upgrades, including the installation of new tooling, equipment, and overhead conveyor systems across the facility. These allowed GM to triple the production rate of the Volt, facilitating the plant's readiness for the manufacturing of the 2012 Volt and Ampera. After the plant retooling, the production rate reached 150 units per day four days a week by August 2011. The Volt plant also underwent a shutdown in January 2012 to prepare for the production of the California lower-emission version. A four-week hiatus due to slow sales occurred between March and April 2012. GM, citing around 3,600 Volts in inventory, desired to reduce dealer inventories as production was expected to meet market demand. From September 17 to October 15, 2012, GM closed its Detroit-Hamtramck plant, affecting approximately 1,500 workers during downtime. This closure was for retooling to accommodate the assembly of the all-new tenth generation Chevrolet Impala alongside the 2013 Volt.

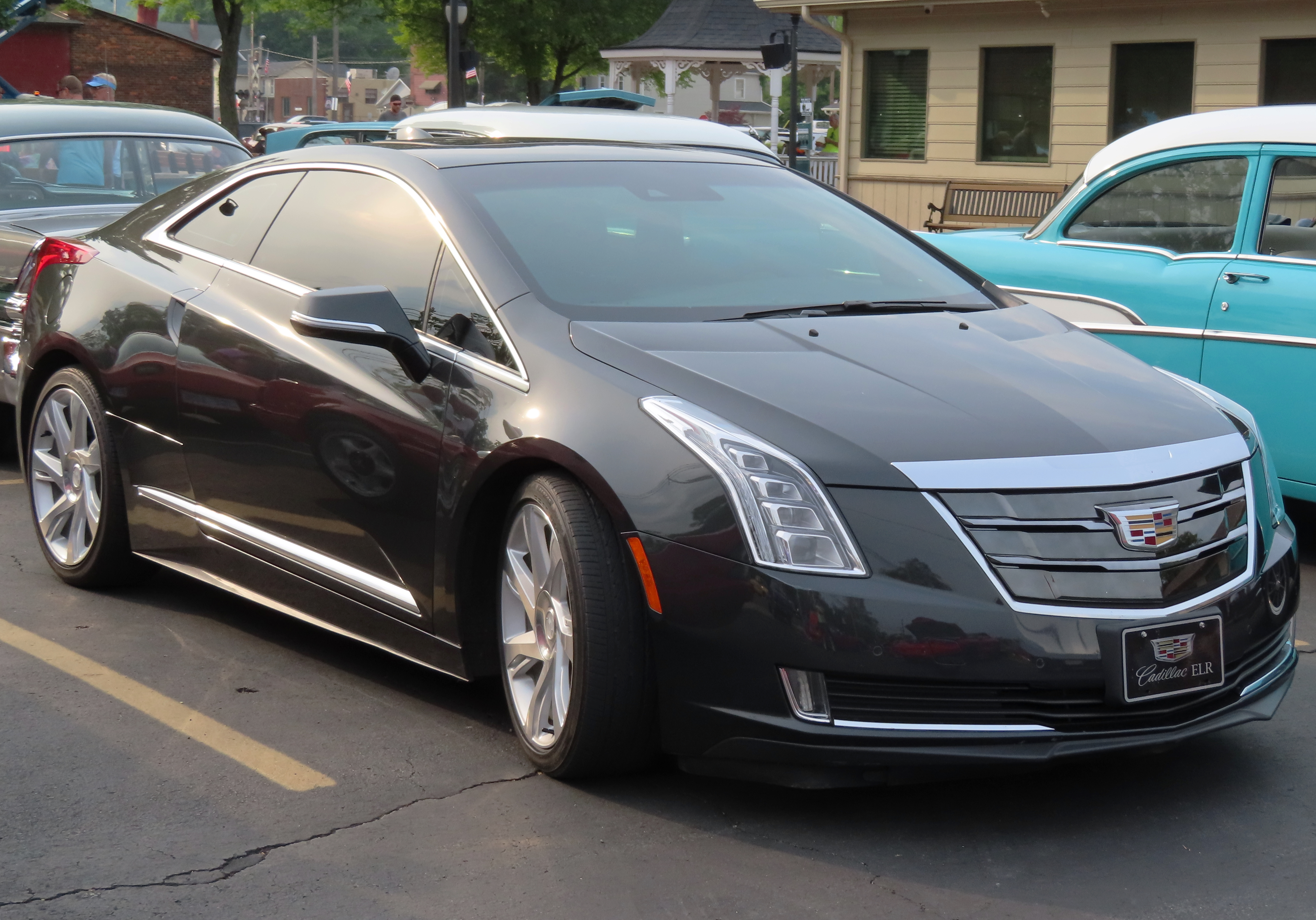
The Cadillac ELR (pictured) and the Volt were both produced at the same Detroit facility and share the Voltec powertrain.

In July 2012, production officially began for the 2013 model year Volt; deliveries commenced in the same month. In October 2012, GM announced that the Detroit-Hamtramck Assembly plant would serve as the manufacturing site for the Cadillac ELR luxury range-extender coupe, alongside the Volt and the Ampera. The inclusion of the ELR at the plant involved an investment of US$35 million, contributing to a cumulative product expenditure of US$561 million since December 2009. The first 2014 ELRs were produced in late May 2013, serving as pre-production units designated for testing before retail production began by the close of 2013. Official manufacture of the first generation of the Volt ended on May 21, 2015; assembly of the pre-production second generation units began in March.

In February 2012, GM introduced a low-emission version tailored for the Californian market. It features a package that classifies it as an "enhanced, advanced technology – partial zero-emissions vehicle" (enhAT-PZEV), granting it access to California's high-occupancy vehicle lanes (HOV). Updates encompass alterations to its engine and exhaust components. The catalytic converter was modified to add a secondary air-injection pump that introduces ambient air into the exhaust stream to help remove pollutants.

=== Europe ===
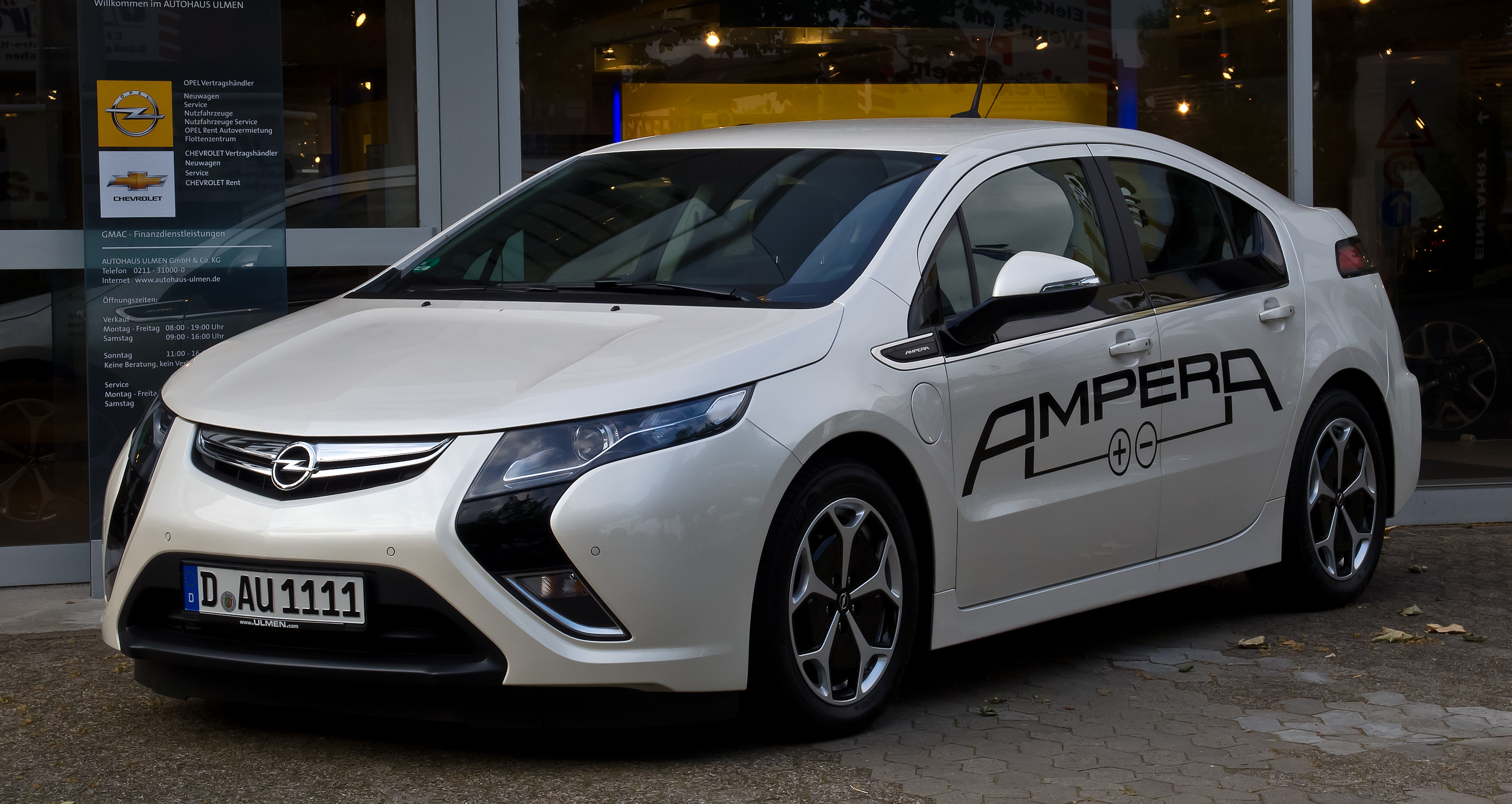
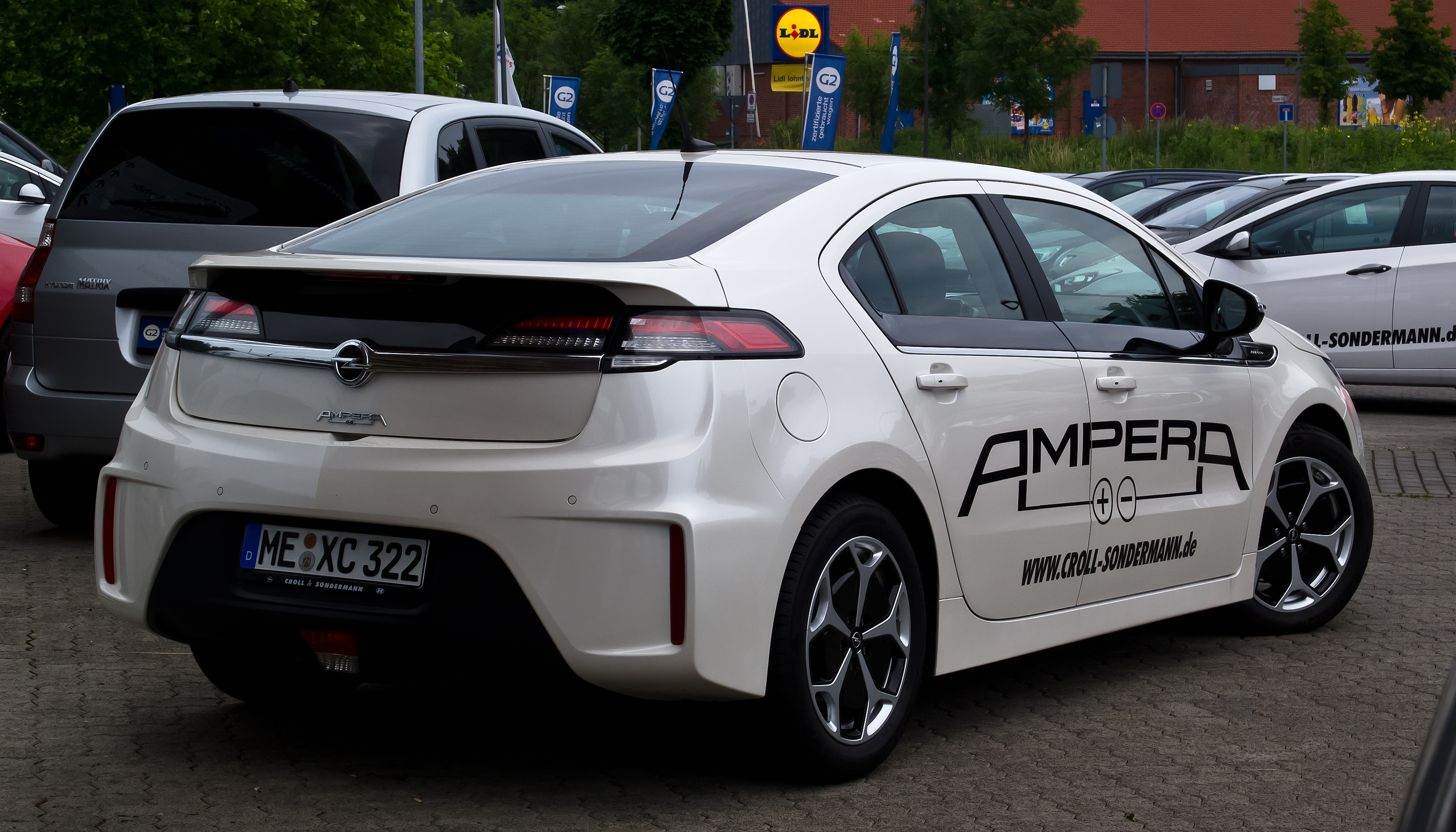
Opel Ampera

The European version of the Volt, the Opel Ampera (known as the Vauxhall Ampera in the United Kingdom), debuted at the Geneva Auto Show in March 2009 and was also exhibited at the 2009 Frankfurt Auto Show. Opel developed the battery control modules for the Ampera at the Opel Alternative Propulsion Center Europe in Mainz-Kastel, Germany. The production version of the Ampera was unveiled at the 2011 Geneva Motor Show.

While the Volt and Ampera share the same powertrain and battery pack, their primary distinctions lie in their styling. The Ampera has boomerang-shape headlamps that integrate with the fog lamps and a thinner light strip at the rear with a large cut-out at the bumper. The Ampera comes with stylized alloy wheels as a standard feature, and its body-colored side skirts distinguish it from the Volt, which has black side skirts. One key operational difference is that the Ampera offers four drive modes, one more than the 2011/12 model year Volt. The additional option is City Mode, tailored to the needs of commuter travel. City Mode, or "battery hold," activates the range-extender immediately, enabling the preservation of energy stored in the battery. When switched off, the range-extender halts, allowing the Ampera to utilize the saved energy for pure electric driving, particularly useful in urban areas, restricted zones like European low emission zones, or to qualify for exemptions such as the London congestion charge.

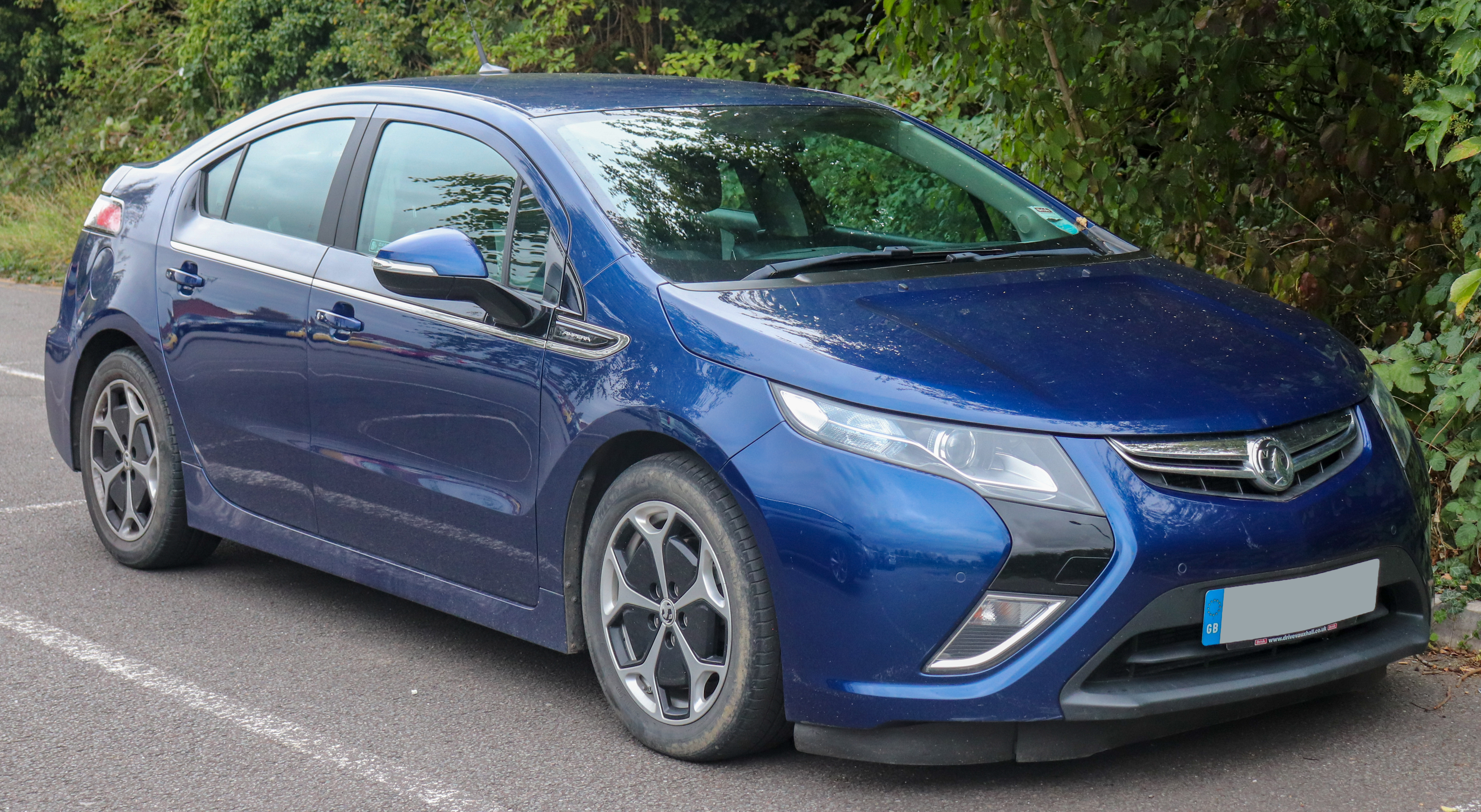
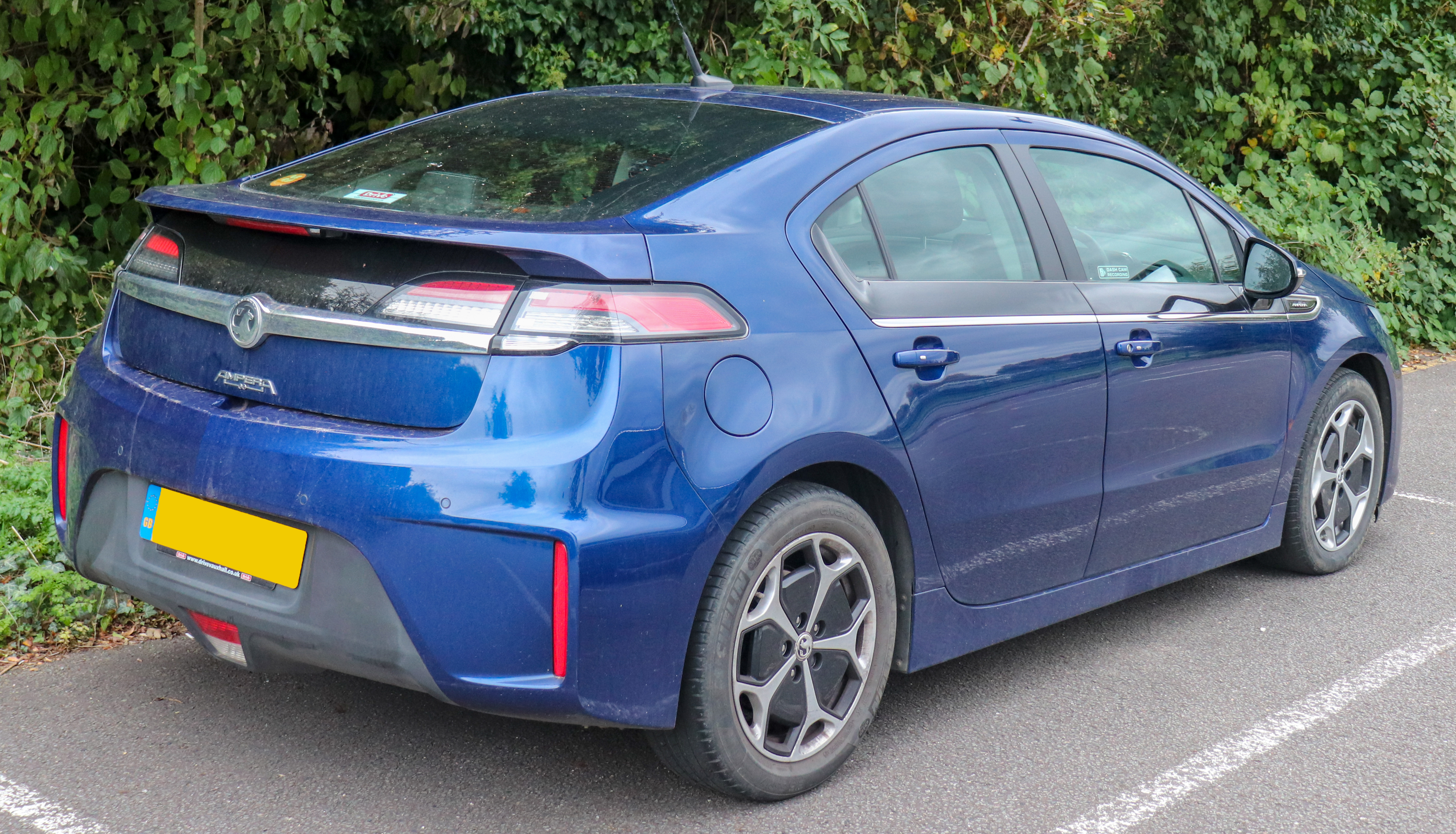
Amperas intended for the UK market feature the Vauxhall badge.

The carmaker targeted the Ampera for the business fleet market and local government agencies, where Opel has a strong customer base, while the Volt is aimed at retail customers. The first deliveries of the Chevrolet Volt in Europe took place on November 30, 2011, to the U.S. Embassy in France. Distribution of the Opel Ampera to dealerships began in December 2011, but deliveries to customers were delayed until February 2012, as Opel decided to await the conclusion of the NHTSA investigation into the Volt's battery fire risk following a crash. From May 2012 onward, the Vauxhall Ampera became available through the Zipcar carsharing club in London, Bristol, Cambridge, and Oxford. In July 2014, Opel announced the discontinuation of the Ampera, citing a slowdown in sales. They further outlined that between 2014 and 2018, they planned to introduce a successor electric vehicle in Europe.

Despite sharing European Car of the Year with the Volt in 2012, the Ampera faced challenges in gaining widespread commercial success since its launch. In 2013, sales experienced a 40 per cent decline, totaling 3,184 cars. The deceleration continued into the following year, with sales plummeting by 67 percent in the first five months to 332 cars. GM hinted at Ampera's forthcoming discontinuation in early 2013, as then-vice chairman Steve Girsky expressed frustration regarding the car's unenthusiastic reception in Europe. "All the governments in Europe said, 'We want EVs, we want EVs'. We show up with one, and where is everybody?", stated Girsky.

=== Australasia ===
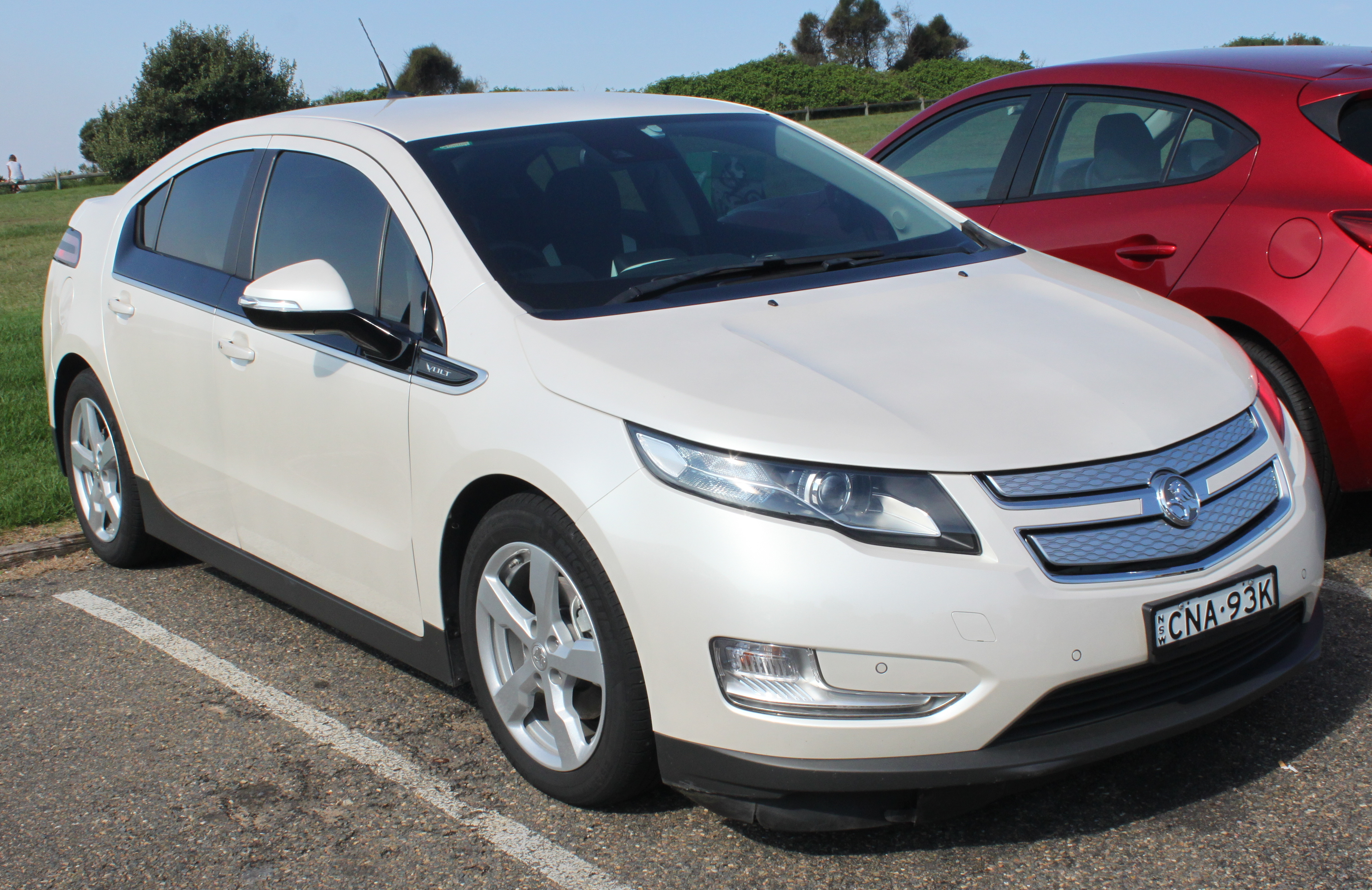

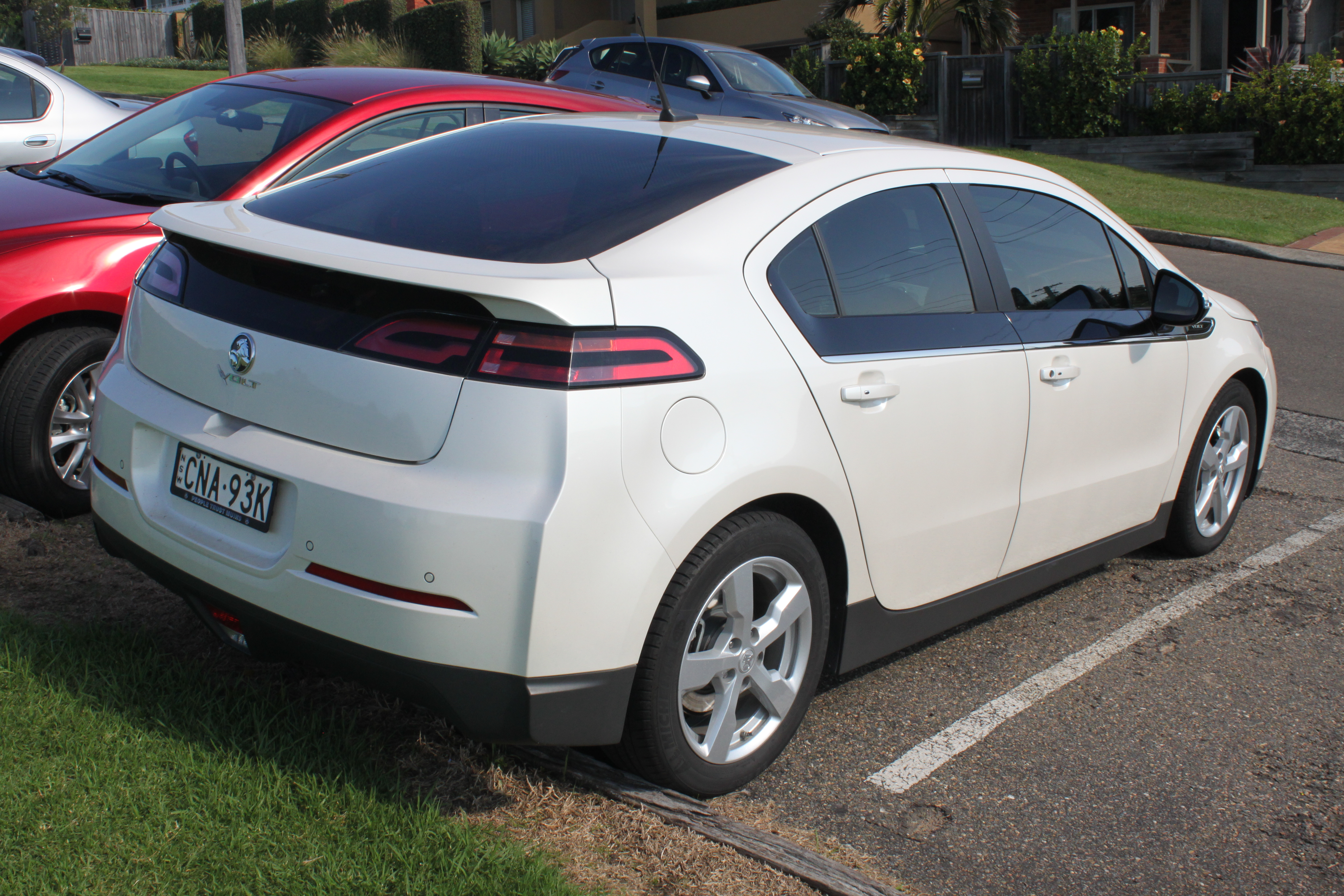
Holden Volt

Deliveries of the Holden Volt in the Australian market began in December 2012, with the first unit delivered to the U.S. Ambassador in Canberra. In November 2011, the first Holden Volt arrived in Australia for a series of evaluation tests. Holden stated that the Volt underwent numerous modifications to enhance its suitability for Australian roads, although the test vehicles remained left-hand drive.

The Holden Volt was made accessible through 49 selected Holden dealerships across metropolitan and rural areas of Australia. Of these, 18 were located in Victoria, 11 in New South Wales, 9 in Queensland, 7 in Western Australia, and 4 in South Australia. By mid-April 2015, a total of 246 units had been sold, depleting the stock of the first generation. In response to General Motors' announcement that the second generation Volt would not be produced in a right-hand-drive configuration, the Volt was discontinued in Australia upon the sale of the remaining stock.

The Holden Volt was introduced in New Zealand through three dealerships in Auckland, Christchurch and Wellington, with deliveries starting in late 2012. By mid-2015, only 16 units were registered despite a price drop of more than NZ$10,000. Due to low sales of the first-generation model, the second-generation Volt was not available in New Zealand.

== Controversies and criticism ==
=== EPA fuel economy testing ===
In 2008, General Motors expressed concerns regarding the United States Environmental Protection Agency (EPA) testing procedures for the Volt's official fuel economy rating. The focal point of the controversy revolved around whether the inclusion of a gasoline engine should categorize the Volt as a hybrid electric vehicle rather than an electric car, as asserted by General Motors. If subjected to the same EPA tests applied to other hybrids, the Volt's EPA fuel economy rating would be about 48 mpg_{‑US} (4.9 L/100 km; 58 mpg_{‑imp}) due to the EPA test for hybrids, prohibiting vehicles from boosting their mpg rating using stored battery power. General Motors argued that the Volt was an entirely new vehicle type not adequately assessed by the EPA's existing fuel economy tests. They advocated for the creation of a new test tailored to the emerging class of hybrid-electrics. General Motors also advocated for a more simplified mpg calculation method to take into account the range of a plug-in hybrid while running solely on electricity. Given the Volt's ability to travel 40 miles (64 km) on batteries alone, GM contended that most drivers with a daily commute of less than that distance would exclusively use electric mode provided they recharged their vehicle at work or home overnight.

In November 2010, the EPA issued an official rating that included separate fuel economy ratings for the Volt's all-electric and gasoline-only modes. The overall combined city/highway gasoline-electricity fuel economy rating was stated as 60 mpg_{‑US} (3.9 L/100 km; 72 mpg_{‑imp}) equivalent (MPG-e). To address the fuel economy variability based on miles driven between charges, the EPA incorporated a table on the Volt's fuel economy label, showing fuel economy and electricity consumed for five different scenarios driven between a full charge, and a never-charge scenario. According to this table, the Volt's fuel economy could reach up to 168 mpg_{‑US} (1.40 L/100 km; 202 mpg_{‑imp}) equivalent (MPG-e) if driven 45 miles (72 km) between full charges. Recognizing the multiple operating modes possible for plug-in hybrids (all-electric, blended, and gasoline-only), the EPA and NHTSA issued separate labels for the new mandatory fuel economy and environment labels beginning in model year 2013. One label was designed for extended-range electric vehicles, such as the Volt, with two modes: all-electric and gasoline-only. The second label was for blended mode, including a combination of all-electric, gasoline and electric operation, and gasoline only, akin to a conventional hybrid vehicle.

=== EPA fuel economy rating ===
In August 2009, General Motors released an estimated city fuel economy rating for the Volt, stating it as 230 mpg_{‑US} (1.0 L/100 km; 280 mpg_{‑imp}) of gasoline plus 25 kWh/100 mi (160 Wh/km) of electricity, using the EPA's proposed method for evaluating plug-in hybrids. The U.S. Environmental Protection Agency (EPA) issued a statement clarifying that they had not tested a Chevy Volt and, therefore, could not confirm the fuel economy values claimed by GM. GM later explained in July 2010 that their estimate relied on a formula that had not been officially approved, and they were awaiting the EPA's decision on how to officially estimate the equivalent fuel economy of plug-in hybrids.

The official EPA rating was eventually issued in November 2010, becoming the agency's first fuel economy label for a plug-in hybrid. According to the EPA, the 2011 Volt had a combined fuel economy rating of 93 mpg‑e (36 kWh/100 mi; 230 Wh/km) in all-electric mode and 37 mpg_{‑US} (6.4 L/100 km; 44 mpg_{‑imp}) in gasoline-only mode, resulting in an overall combined fuel economy rating of 60 mpg_{‑US} (3.9 L/100 km; 72 mpg_{‑imp}) equivalent. The label also provided the combined city-highway fuel economy in all-electric mode using traditional energy consumption units, rating the Volt at 36 kWh/100 mi (220 Wh/km).

=== Battery pack fire risk ===
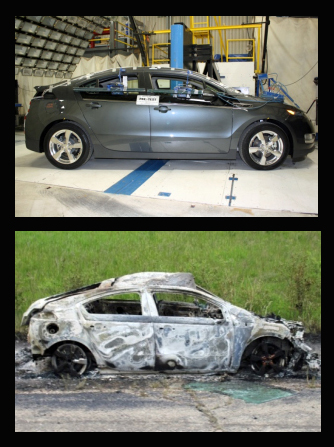
The Chevrolet Volt, which ignited following the pole test in June 2011. The top image displays the condition of the car before the fire, while the bottom shows the aftermath of the incident.

In June 2011, a Volt that had been subjected by the National Highway Traffic Safety Administration (NHTSA) to a 20 mph (32 km/h) side pole impact crash test, followed by a post-impact rollover, caught fire three weeks later in the test center parking lot, leading to the combustion of nearby vehicles. The investigation determined that the source of the fire was the Volt's battery. Following the incident, both Chevrolet and the NHTSA independently replicated the crash test and a subsequent vehicle rotation procedure to test for any fluid leakage. In their initial attempt, they were unable to reproduce the conditions that led to the battery pack ignition. The NHTSA concluded that the crash test had damaged the Volt's lithium-ion battery, ultimately causing a vehicle fire that took several weeks to manifest. In further testing of the Volt's batteries in November 2011, conducted by the NHTSA, two out of three tests resulted in thermal events. One battery pack rotated 180 degrees shortly after impact, began smoking and emitting sparks. In the other case, the battery pack that had been crash-tested a week earlier and was under monitoring since the test caught fire. In response to these findings, on November 25, 2011, the NHTSA took an unusual step and initiated a formal safety defect investigation, even without data from real-world incidents. The investigation aimed to examine the potential risks associated with intrusion damage to the battery pack in the Chevrolet Volt. Following the initial Volt fire, the NHTSA examined other plug-in electric vehicles, including the Nissan Leaf, and stated that its testing "has not raised safety concerns about vehicles other than the Chevy Volt".

As a consequence of the investigation, General Motors announced that it would offer any new GM car as an exchange for concerned Volt owners while the federal investigation was ongoing. In December 2011, the company expressed its readiness to recall all vehicles and implement necessary repairs once the cause of the fires was determined. GM also stated its willingness to repurchase the car if an owner felt uneasy about the potential fire risk. The CEO of GM acknowledged the possibility of redesigning or making changes to the battery pack based on recommendations from federal officials. By December 1, 2011, 33 Volt owners in the U.S. and 3 in Canada had requested loaner cars. By December 5, General Motors reported that several dozen Volt owners had requested the company to buy back their cars, with the company agreeing to repurchase about a dozen. Before the carmaker agrees to buy back each vehicle, other options are explored as GM primarily wants to provide loaner cars, but "if the only way we can make them happy is to repurchase it, then we will", stated GM spokesman Selim Bingol. General Motors explained that the buyback price includes the Volt purchase price, plus taxes and fees, less a usage fee based on how many miles the car has been run. By January 5, 2012, GM reported that approximately 250 Volt owners had requested either a loaner vehicle or a potential buyback.

The NHTSA also mentioned its collaboration with all automakers to establish post-crash procedures ensuring the safety of occupants in electric vehicles and emergency responders at crash scenes. Additionally, the NHTSA cautioned about the potential for fires to occur a significant time after a crash. General Motors asserted that the initial fire could have been prevented if the company's protocols for deactivating the battery post-crash had been followed. In another statement, the carmaker expressed its ongoing efforts, stating "We are working with other vehicle manufacturers, first responders, tow truck operators, and salvage associations to implement industrywide protocols".

==== Battery enhancements ====
On January 5, 2012, General Motors announced its intention to implement a customer-satisfaction initiative for the Chevrolet Volt. The program was designed to introduce voluntary enhancements, addressing concerns about the potential for the battery pack to catch fire days or weeks after a severe accident. General Motors clarified that neither the car nor the battery was being recalled. The company identified the June fire incident as stemming from a minor intrusion into a side section of the battery pack, causing a small coolant leak of approximately 50 mL (1.8 imp fl oz; 1.7 US fl oz). When the vehicle was put through a slow roll, where it was rotated at 90-degree increments, holding in each position for about five minutes, an additional 1 liter (0.22 imp gal; 0.26 U.S. gal) of coolant leaked. With the vehicle in the 180-degree position (upside down), the coolant came in contact with the printed circuit board electronics at the top of the battery pack and later crystallized. Three weeks later, this condition, combined with a charged battery, led to a short circuit, resulting in the post-crash fire.

General Motors clarified that the modifications aim to reinforce the vehicle structure surrounding the battery and enhance the battery coolant system for improved battery protection following a severe crash. The safety upgrades include strengthening a specific section of the Volt's vehicle safety structure to provide additional safeguarding for the battery pack during a severe side collision. This involves incorporating a sensor in the battery coolant system reservoir to monitor coolant levels and adding a tamper-resistant bracket to the top of the reservoir to prevent potential coolant overfill. The additional side safety structural pieces have a total weight of 2 to 3 lb (0.91 to 1.36 kg), and their function is to spread the load of a severe side impact away from the battery pack, reducing the possibility of intrusion into the pack.

In December 2011, General Motors conducted four crash tests on Volts equipped with reinforced steel and an upgraded cooling system. The results showed no intrusion to the battery and no coolant leakage. On December 22, 2011, the NHTSA subjected a modified Volt to the same test that initially resulted in the fire, revealing no indications of the damage believed to have caused the incident. The NHTSA stated that "the preliminary results of the crash test indicate the remedy proposed by General Motors today should address the issue of battery intrusion", although their investigation remained ongoing. General Motors did not disclose the cost of the modifications.

All 12,400 Chevrolet Volts manufactured until December 2011, including the Amperas held in stock at European dealerships, were slated to receive the safety enhancements. As production was temporarily halted during the holidays, the modifications were implemented when production resumed in early 2012. Sales continued, and dealers carried out the necessary modifications on the Volts they had in stock. General Motors communicated to Volt owners, advising them that they could schedule a service appointment to safeguard their batteries starting in the last week of March 2012.

==== NHTSA findings ====
On January 20, 2012, the National Highway Traffic Safety Administration (NHTSA) concluded its safety defect investigation concerning the Volt's post-crash fire risk. The agency determined that there was "no discernible defect trend" and acknowledged that the modifications recently implemented by General Motors were effective in reducing the potential for battery intrusion resulting from side impacts. The NHTSA also stated that, based on the available data, it did not believe that Chevy Volts or other electric vehicles posed a greater risk of fire compared to gasoline-powered vehicles. The agency also announced the development of interim guidance aimed at increasing awareness and identifying appropriate safety measures regarding electric vehicles for the emergency response community, law enforcement officers, tow truck operators, storage facilities and consumers.

==== House of Representatives hearing ====
The chairman of the Subcommittee on Regulatory Affairs, Stimulus Oversight, and Government Spending, U.S. Representative Jim Jordan, held hearings on January 25, 2012, to probe into why the NHTSA initiated a formal investigation only five months after the first post-crash battery fire occurred in June. The subcommittee, a part of the House Committee on Oversight and Government Reform, aimed to ascertain whether government officials, including those from the NHTSA, intentionally withheld information about the Volt fire for political reasons. Both Daniel Akerson, General Motors CEO, and David L. Strickland, NHTSA administrator, denied any wrongdoing.

== Awards and recognition ==
Year	Award	Publisher/Awarded at	Reference
U.S. organizations
2009	Green Car Vision Award	Green Car Journal	
2011	Motor Trend Car of the Year	Motor Trend	
2011	Car and Driver Ten Best Cars	Car and Driver	
2011	Green Car of the Year	Green Car Journal	
2011	Automobile of the Year	Automobile Magazine	
2011	North American Car of the Year	North American International Auto Show (Note: Both judges and writers voted for this; the Volt was the choice of 49 American and Canadian automobile writers, while the judges based their opinion on innovation, design, safety, handling, driver satisfaction and value.)	
2011	Greenest Vehicles of the Year	American Council for an Energy-Efficient Economy	
2011	Best Green Cars	Mother Earth News	
2011	Edison Award (Note: The Volt received the Gold position in the Personal Transportation segment.)	Edison Awards	
2011	Best Resale Value Award (Note: In the plug-in electric vehicle segment)	Kelley Blue Book	
European organizations
2011	Winner of What Car? Green Awards (Vauxhall Ampera)	What Car?	
2011	European Car of the Year (Note: This was awarded to both the Chevrolet Volt and Opel Ampera. They became the first US-developed automobiles to win this award.)	Geneva Motor Show	
2013	Green Mobility Trophy	Auto Zeitung	
International organizations
2011	World Green Car	World Car of the Year	
2012	International Engine of the Year Award (Note: In the category of "Green Engine". This award was given to both the Volt and Ampera.)	UKi Media & Events	
Australian organizations
2012	Green Innovation Award (Holden Volt) (Note: As part of the Drive's Car of the Year Awards)	Drive	

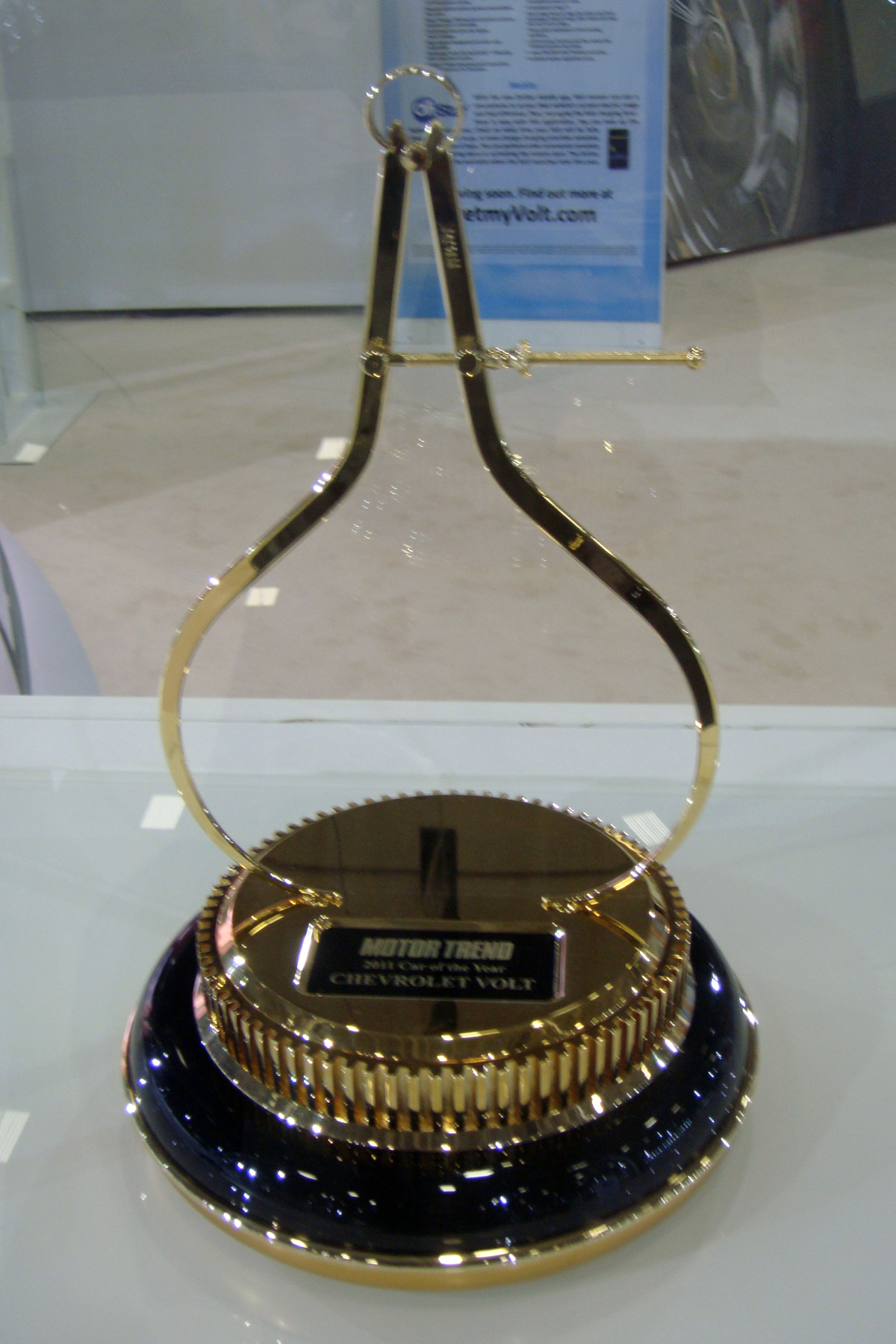
The Chevrolet Volt won the 2011 Motor Trend Car of the Year award.

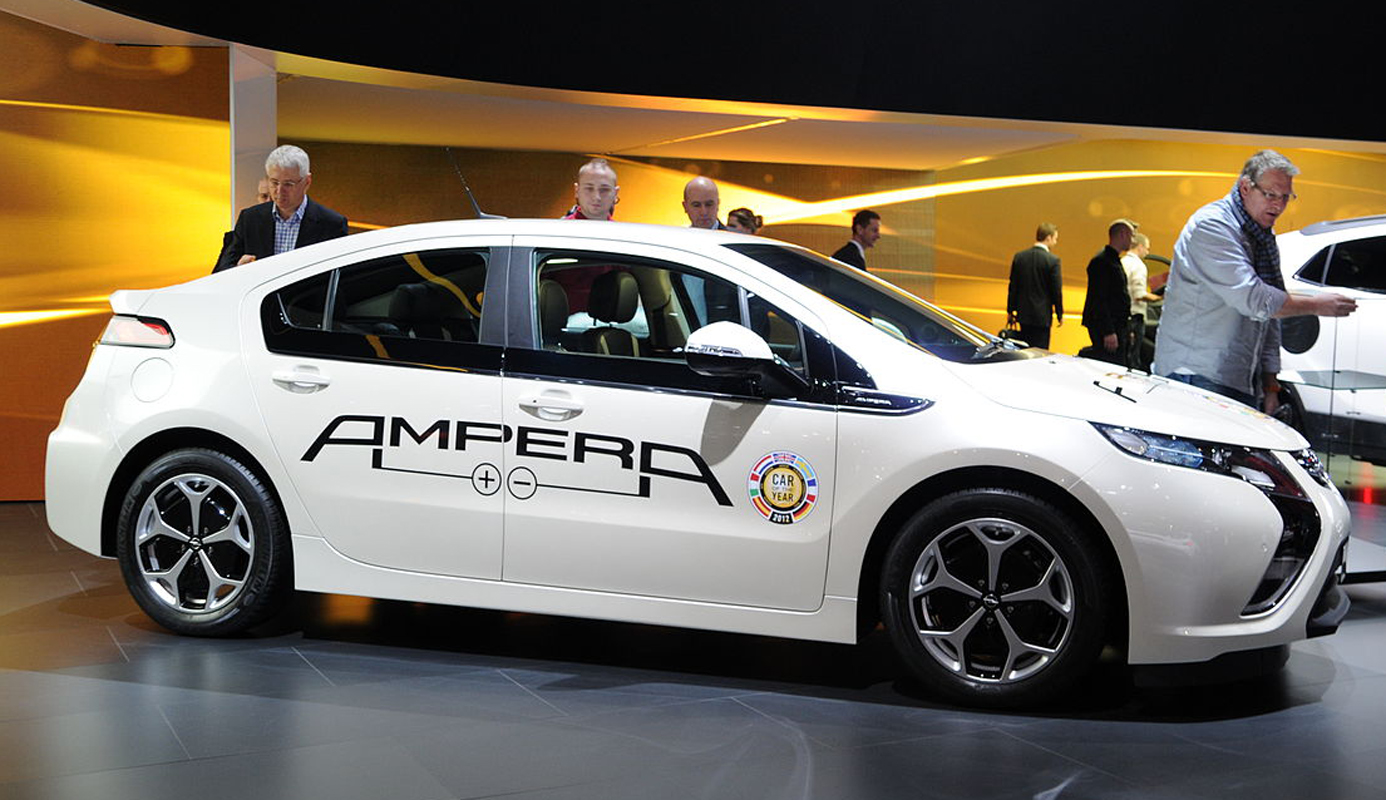
Opel Ampera exhibited with the 2012 European Car of the Year logo at the Geneva Motor Show

== Sources ==
- Brooke, Lindsay (2011). Chevrolet Volt. Detroit: SAE International. ISBN 978-0-7680-5783-6.
- Edsall, Larry (2010). Endres, Chris (ed.). Chevrolet Volt: Charging into the Future. Foreword by Bob Lutz (Hardcover ed.). Minneapolis, Minnesota: Motorbooks. ISBN 978-0-7603-3893-3. LCCN 2010025093.
- Fletcher, Seth (2011). Bottled Lightning: Superbatteries, Electric Cars, and the New Lithium Economy (First ed.). New York: Hill and Wang. ISBN 978-0-8090-3053-8. LCCN 2010047695. OCLC 676728720.
- Rafinejad, Dariush (2013). "Chevrolet Volt: A Disruptive Innovation Bridge to Electrified Transportation" (PDF). San Francisco, California: Presidio Graduate School. Archived from the original (PDF) on September 27, 2013.
- Sperling, Daniel (2018). Three Revolutions. Island Press. ISBN 978-1-6109-1905-0. LCCN 2017951060. OCLC 1007086853.
