= Buick Wildcat EV =

Concept car developed by Buick

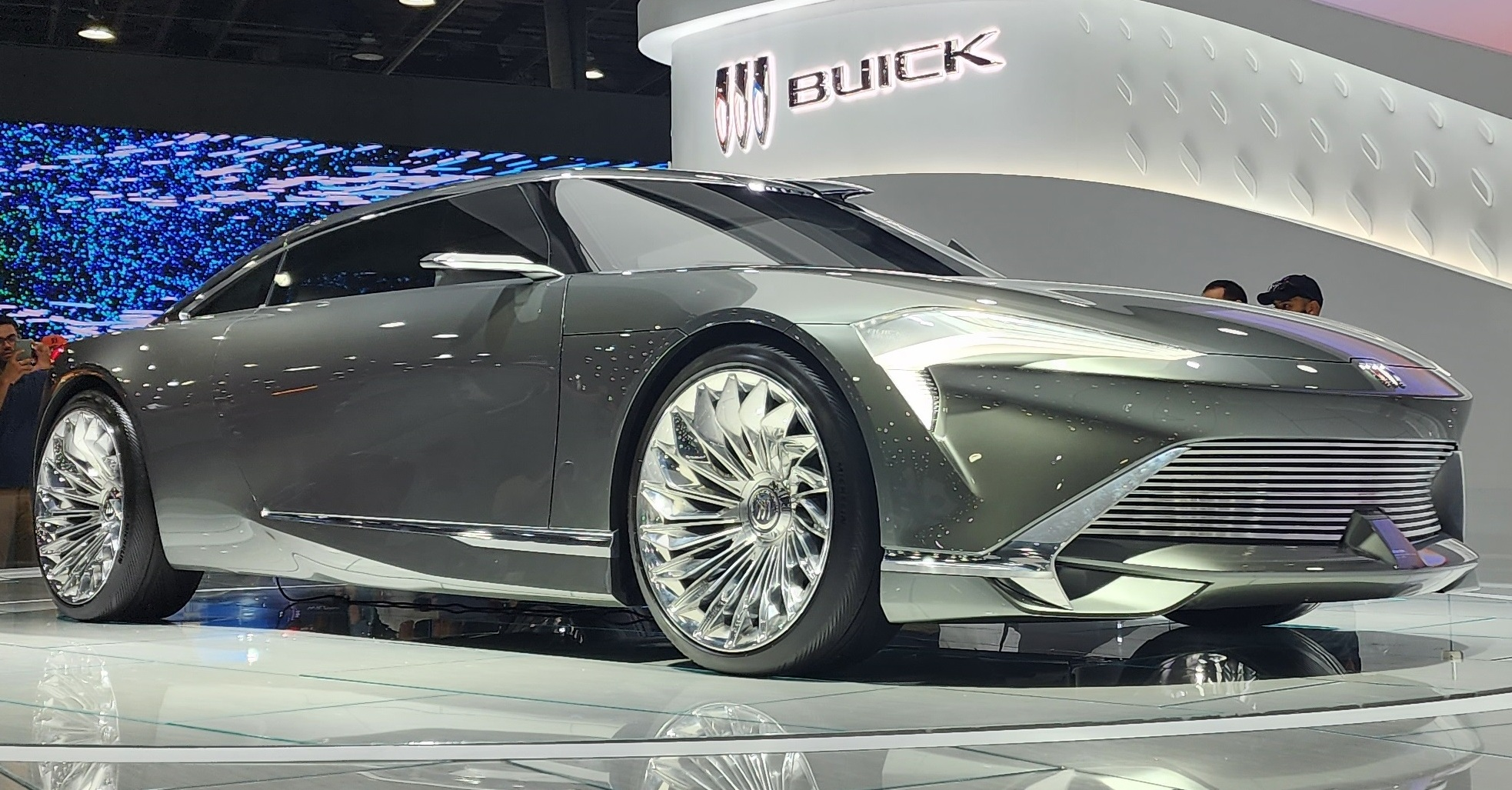
- Buick Wildcat EV Concept as seen at NAIAS 2022

Overview
- Manufacturer: General Motors
- Production: 2022
- Designer: Bob Boniface, Sharon Gauci, Therese Pinazzo

Body and chassis
- Class: Concept car
- Body style: coupe
- Layout: M4 Layout
- Doors: 2-door

Powertrain
- Electric motor: 2 front axle, 2 rear axle
- Power output: ~800 horsepower (811.1 PS; 596.6 kW) @ 6,000 rpm ~800 pound-feet (1,084.7 N⋅m) (Projected)
- Transmission: Direct Drive (1 Speed)
- Range: 300 miles (483 km)

Dimensions
- Wheelbase: 110 inches (2,794 mm)
- Length: 186.5 inches (4,737 mm)
- Width: 86.2 inches (2,189 mm)
- Height: 45 inches (1,143 mm)
- Curb weight: 4,900 pounds (2,223 kg) (Projected)

Chronology
- Predecessor: Buick Wildcat

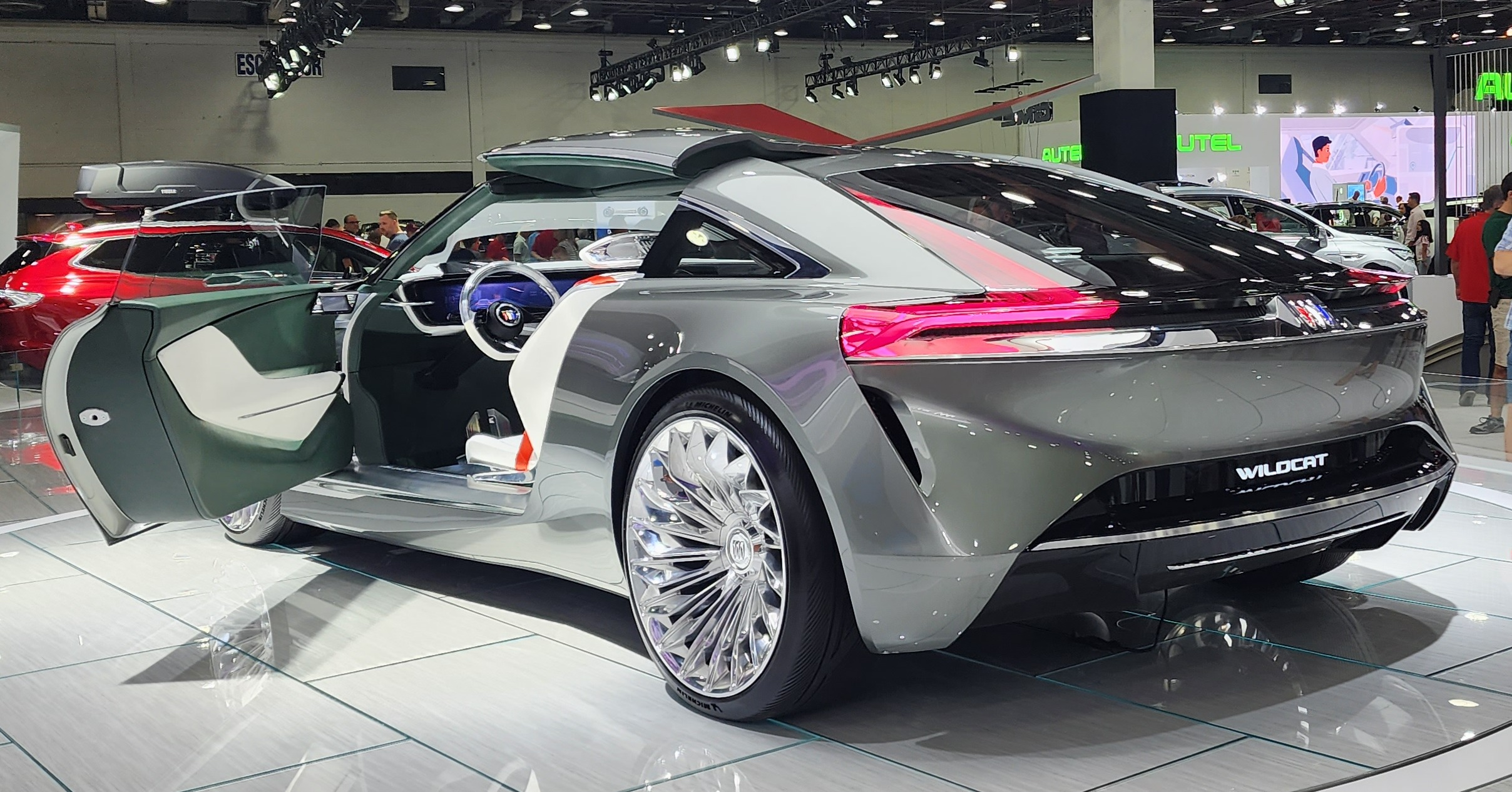
Rear quarter view on stage at the 2022 North American International Auto Show.

The Buick Wildcat EV Concept is an electric concept car that was presented by Buick in June 2022. It previews the first of the brand's range of electric vehicles.

== History ==
The Wildcat EV concept was introduced on June 2, 2022, alongside the Buick Electra-X Concept. It is noted for the redesigned corporate Trishield emblem, which ditches the ring and separates the shields from each other. The insides of the shields feature colored "swooshes", retaining the red, white, and blue color scheme of the old logo. It also appears that the new emblem can light up as well, similar to Lincoln's illuminated star emblem.

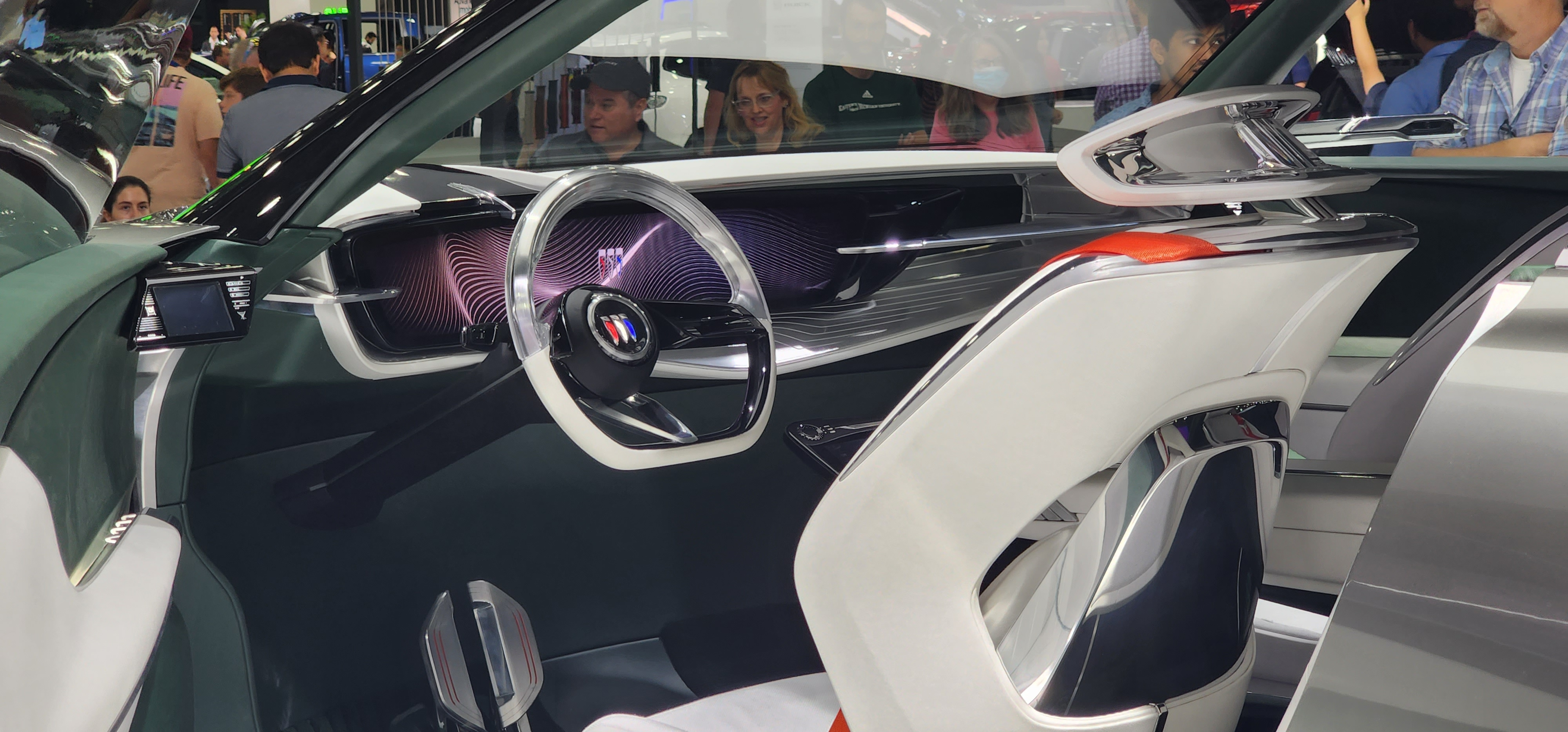
Interior view.

The Wildcat EV takes its name from the full-size car of the same name, which in turn was named after a series of 1950s Buick concept cars.
