= Bob Boniface =

American automobile and industrial designer

Robert Boniface is an American automobile and industrial designer who has worked for Chrysler and General Motors.

== Background ==
Born in Youngstown, Ohio into a family of eight children, Boniface began drawing cars at the age of four.

== Education ==
Boniface graduated from Vanderbilt University in 1987 with a bachelor’s degree in Psychology and Economics. In 1993, he graduated with a bachelor’s of fine arts degree in Transportation Design from the College of Creative Studies in Detroit, MI.

== Chrysler ==
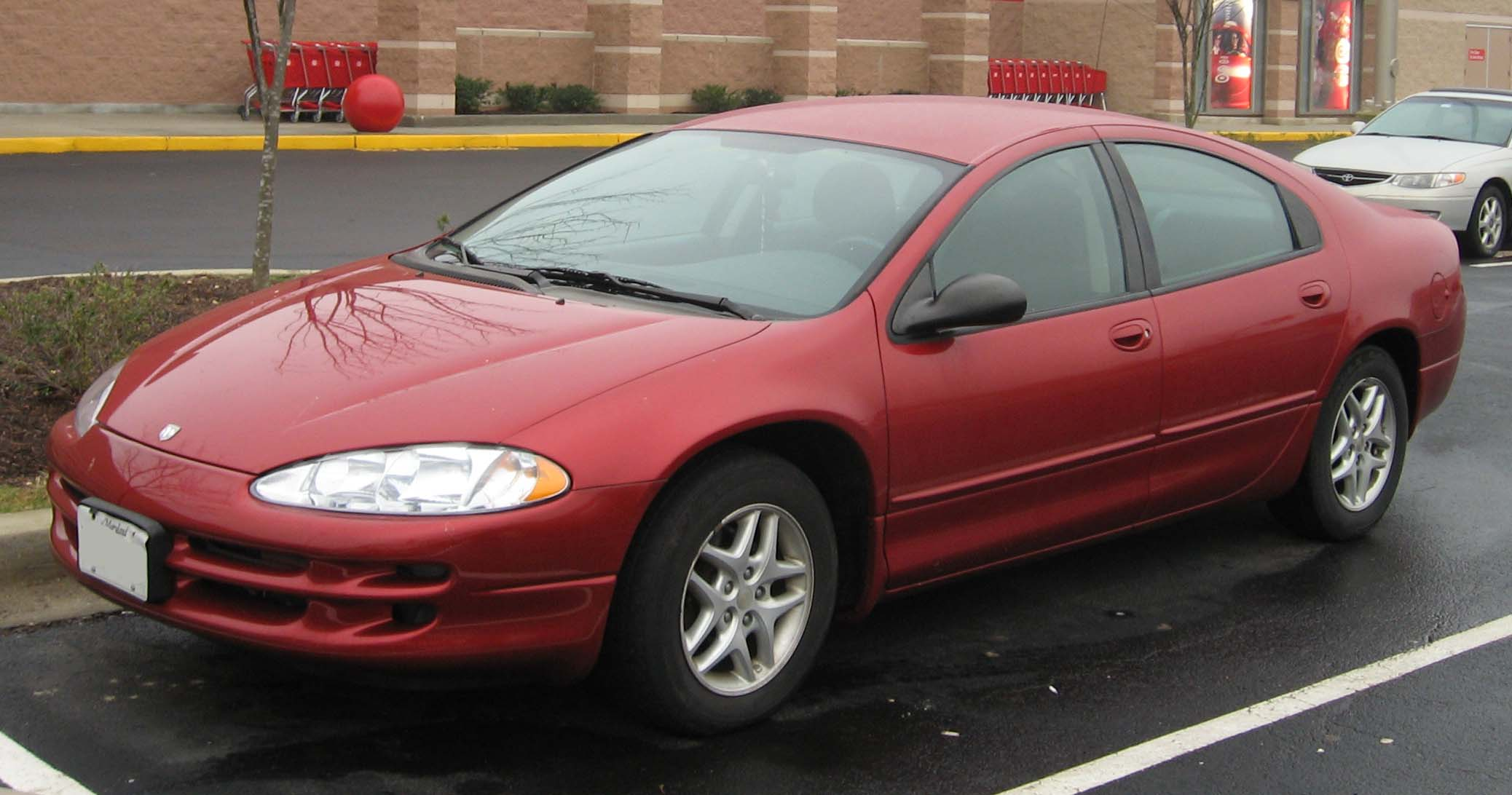
1998-2004 Dodge Intrepid

Boniface was the Chief Designer at Daimler Chrysler’s Advanced Product Design Studio. He directed the architectural design of the minivan Sto-N-Go seating as well as Chrysler’s rear wheel drive 300C. He was also the lead designer for the 2002 Jeep Liberty, 1998 Dodge Intrepid and the 1996 Dodge Intrepid ESX Hybrid Concept Car.

== General Motors ==
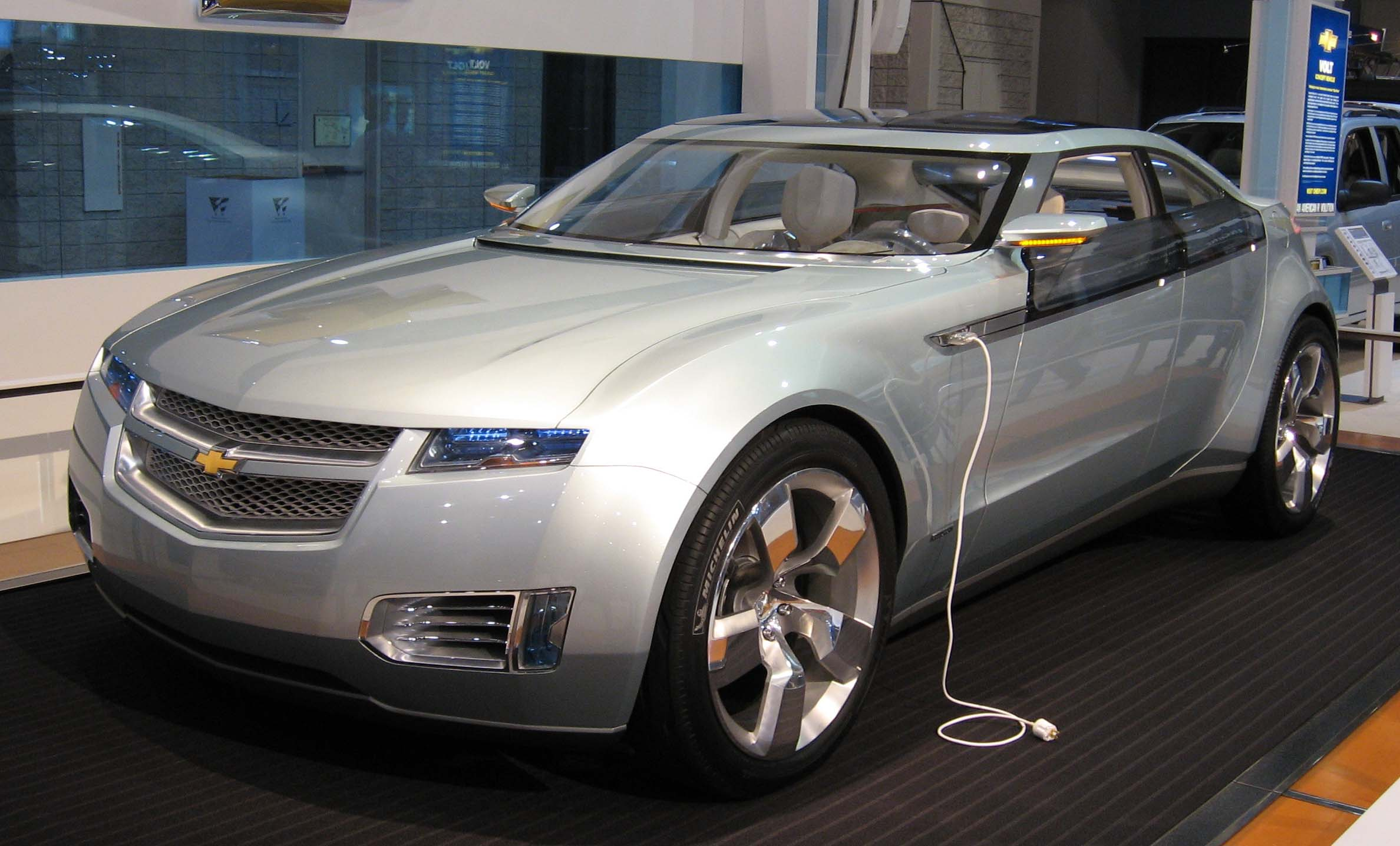
Chevrolet Volt Concept

Boniface went on to direct the interior and exterior design of the 2011 Chevrolet Volt production vehicle. Boniface appeared in the movie Revenge of the Electric Car.

Boniface later became Cadillac's director of exterior design, where he oversaw the design of the 2014 Cadillac CTS, 2015 Cadillac ATS Coupe, 2016 Cadillac ATS V, 2016 Cadillac CTS V, 2016 Cadillac CT6, and 2016 Cadillac XT5.

Boniface won 2014 Detroit Free Press Automotive Leadership award for design.

As Director of Global Buick Design, Boniface oversaw the design of the Buick Wildcat EV concept.
