= Ford C-Max =

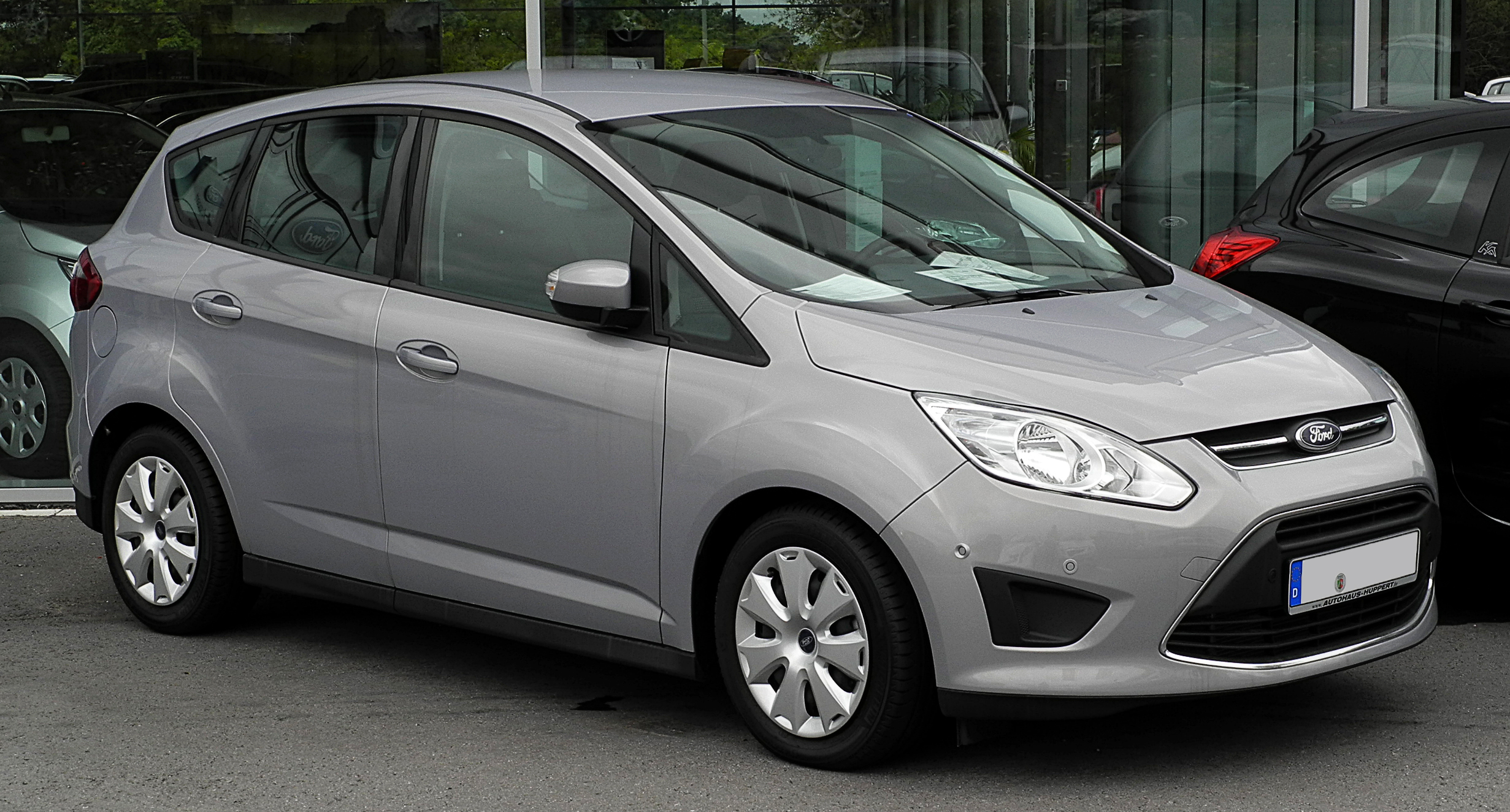
- Ford C-Max 1.6 TDCi Trend

Overview
- Manufacturer: Ford
- Production: 2003–2019

Body and chassis
- Class: Compact MPV
- Body style: 5-door MPV
- Layout: Front-engine, front-wheel-drive

The Ford C-Max (stylized as Ford C-MAX and previously called the Ford Focus C-Max) is a car produced by the Ford Motor Company from 2003 to 2019. It has a five-door compact multi-purpose vehicle (MPV) design. The Ford Grand C-Max has a longer wheelbase.

Ford introduced the C-Max in the United States as its first hybrid-only line of vehicles, which includes the C-Max Hybrid, released in September 2012, and the C-Max Energi plug-in hybrid, launched in October 2012. Although the C-Max was initially available only in Europe, the first generation was partially available in New Zealand.

From September 2017 to mid-2018, production for the C-Max ended in the US. In June 2019, Ford ceased production of the vehicle at the Saarlouis in Germany.

== First generation (2003) ==
First generation
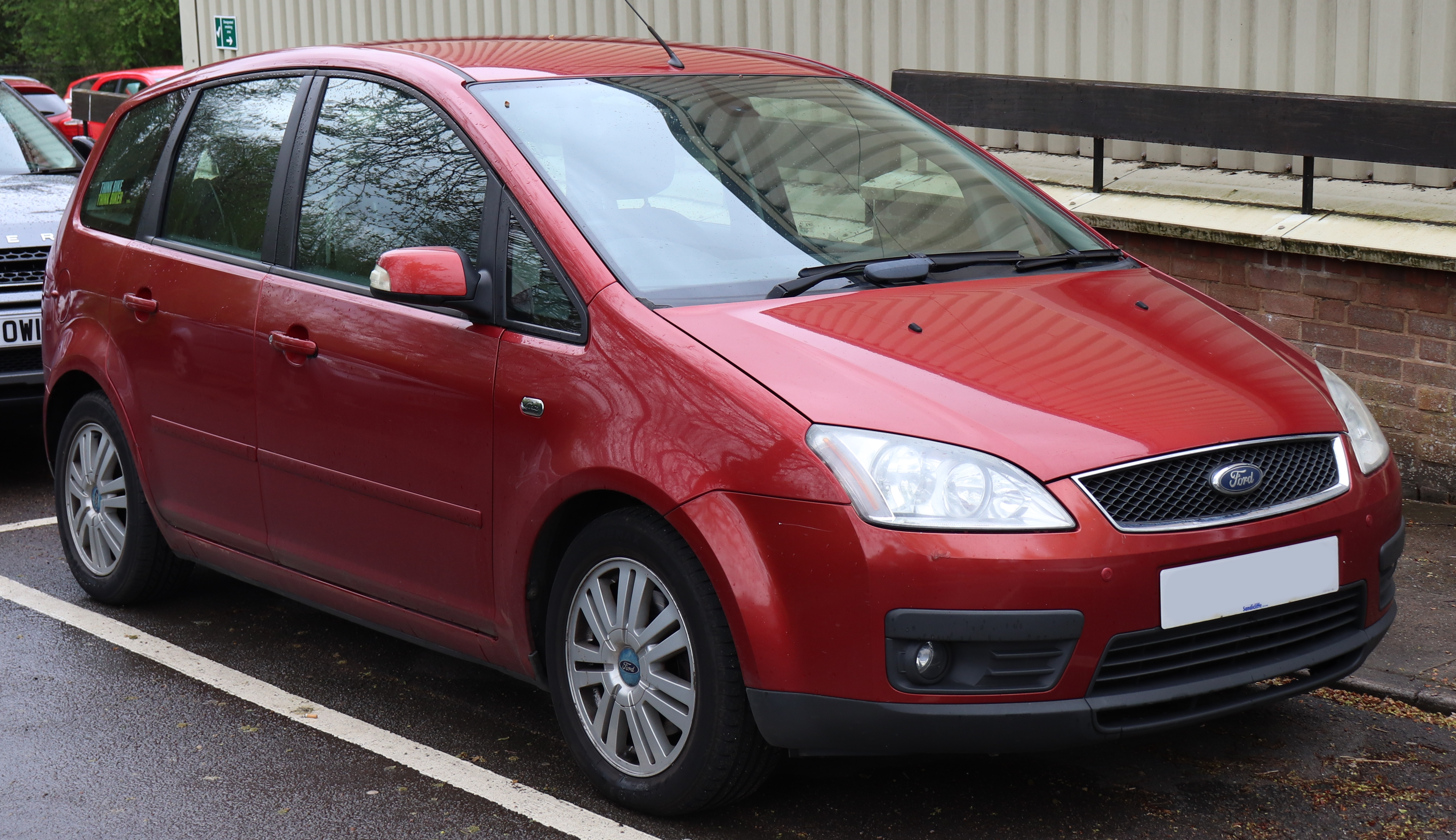

Overview
- Also called: Ford Focus C-Max (2003–2007)
- Production: 2003–2010
- Model years: 2004–2010
- Assembly: Saarlouis, Germany (Saarlouis Body & Assembly)
- Designer: Daniel Paulin

Body and chassis
- Platform: Ford C1 platform

Powertrain
- Engine: petrol: 1.6 L Duratec I4; 1.6 L Duratec Ti-VCT I4; 1.8 L Duratec HE I4; 2.0 L Duratec HE I4; diesel: 1.6 L Duratorq TDCi I4; 1.8 L Duratorq TDCi I4; 2.0 L Duratorq TDCi I4
- Transmission: 4-speed 4F27E Durashift automatic 5-speed iB5/MTX-75 Durashift manual transmission 6-speed Durashift manual transmission 6-speed PowerShift dual-clutch automatic Durashift CVT

Dimensions
- Wheelbase: 2,640 mm (103.9 in)
- Length: 4,371 mm (172.1 in)
- Width: 1,825 mm (71.9 in)
- Height: 1,588 mm (62.5 in)
- Curb weight: 1,372–1,527 kg (3,025–3,366 lb)

The Ford Focus C-Max is preceded by the eponymous show car, which was designed by Daniel Paulin and unveiled at the 2002 Paris Motor Show.

Ford originally planned for a release in the year 2000, to compete with the 1996 Renault Megane Scenic. However, after unveiling of the Opel Zafira with its 7-seat configuration, Ford restarted development, targeting for a 7-seater as well. This would require the Focus to utilize a new platform, instead of the Ford C170 platform used by the Focus Mk1, the C-Max was the first product to use the new Ford C1 platform, also used by the Ford Focus Mk II and the compact MPV Premacy/Mazda5. Its internal code name is C214. Regardless, due to technical difficulties Ford never released a 7-seat version of this generation of C-Max.

It seats five passengers and has a large amount of cargo space, which can be increased by folding the rear seats flat. Some models feature diagonally sliding outer rear seats. It also shares the control blade independent rear suspension from the Focus.

=== Engines and transmissions ===
The available four-cylinder engines are the same as the Focus.
The 1.6 L Duratec was the basic engine for C-Max, and the 1.6 L Ti-VCT Duratec was also available.
The 1.8/2.0 L Duratec HE engines are the rest of available Mazda petrol engines.
The 1.8 L Ford flexifuel, or 1.8f, was a flexible-fuel hybrid engine sourced from Volvo, B4204S5, and was able to run on gasoline and ethanol (E85). Ethanol added about 25 hp extra for a total 125 hp, although with higher consumption.
The 1.6/2.0 L Duratorq Ford/PSA-made diesels were available along with Ford's 1.8 L Endura engine, which is upgraded and named Duratorq.

Model/engine	Capacity	Cylinders/valves	Power/rpm	Torque (Nm)/rpm
1.6 Duratec	1,596 cc	4/16	100 hp (75 kW; 101 PS) at 6000	146 N⋅m (108 lb⋅ft) at 4000
1.6 Duratec Ti-VCT	1,596 cc	4/16	115 hp (86 kW; 117 PS) at 6000	155 N⋅m (114 lb⋅ft) at 4150
1.8 Duratec HE	1,798 cc	4/16	125 hp (93 kW; 127 PS) at 6000	165 N⋅m (122 lb⋅ft) at 4000
1.8F Flexifuel B4184S2	1,798 cc (109.7 in^{3})	4/16	125 PS (92 kW; 123 hp) at 6000	165 N⋅m (122 lb⋅ft) 4000
2.0 Duratec HE	1,999 cc	4/16	145 hp (108 kW; 147 PS) at 6000	185 N⋅m (136 lb⋅ft) at 4500
1.6 Duratorq	1,560 cc	4/16	90 hp (67 kW; 91 PS) at 4000	215 N⋅m (159 lb⋅ft) at 1750
1.6 Duratorq	1,560 cc	4/16	109 hp (81 kW; 111 PS) at 4000	240 N⋅m (177 lbf⋅ft)/*260 N⋅m (192 lbf⋅ft) at 1750
1.8 Duratorq	1,753 cc	4/16	115 hp (86 kW; 117 PS) at 3700	280 N⋅m (207 lbf⋅ft) /*300 N⋅m (221 lbf⋅ft) at 1900
2.0 Duratorq	1,997 cc	4/16	136 hp (101 kW; 138 PS) at 4000	320 N⋅m (236 lbf⋅ft) /*340 N⋅m (251 lbf⋅ft) at 2000

*Overboost

Transmissions mated with engines are Ford IB5 (1.6/1.8 Duratec), Ford Durashift (2.0 Duratorq), MTX-75 (2.0 Duratec / 1.6-1.8 Duratorq) manual and Ford Powershift double-clutch transmission available with 2.0 Duratorq. The 4F27E mated with the 2.0 Duratec engine. A CVT automatic was also available

=== Facelift ===
In December 2006, the facelifted version of the C-Max was revealed at the 2006 Bologna Motor Show and went on sale in late spring 2007. The pre-facelift version of the car (2003–2007) was called the Ford Focus C-Max. The name change to C-Max is attributable to Ford's MPV strategy of creating a 'Max' branded line of MPVs, starting with the Ford S-Max, launched in 2006.

The facelift brought the car in line with Ford's "Kinetic Design" design language, evidenced by its twin trapezoidal grilles, large wheel arches, and angular headlights. As the car does not have a bodyshell originally designed for Kinetic Design, though, Ford officially states that the car contains only "elements" of the design language.

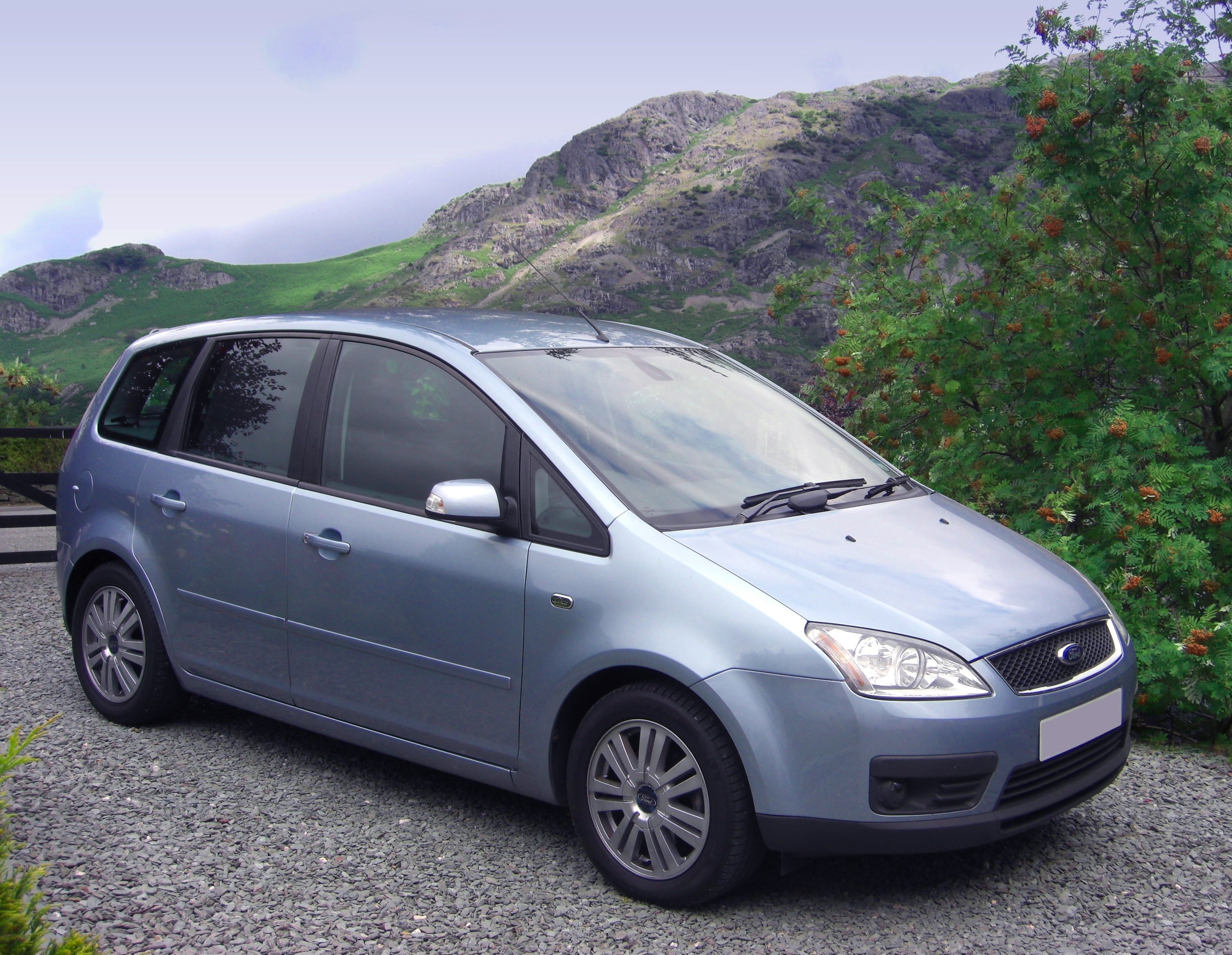
Pre-facelift

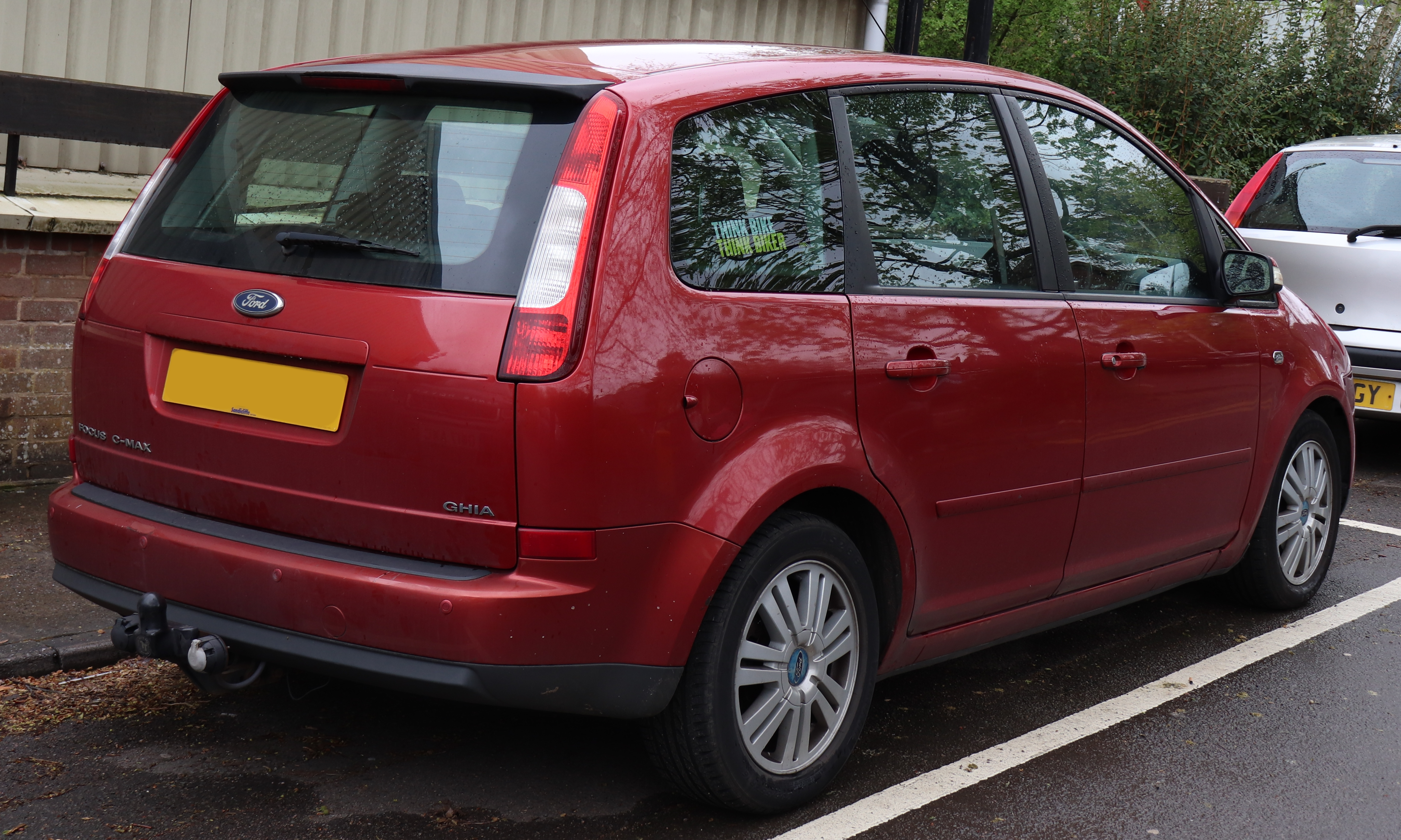
Pre-facelift

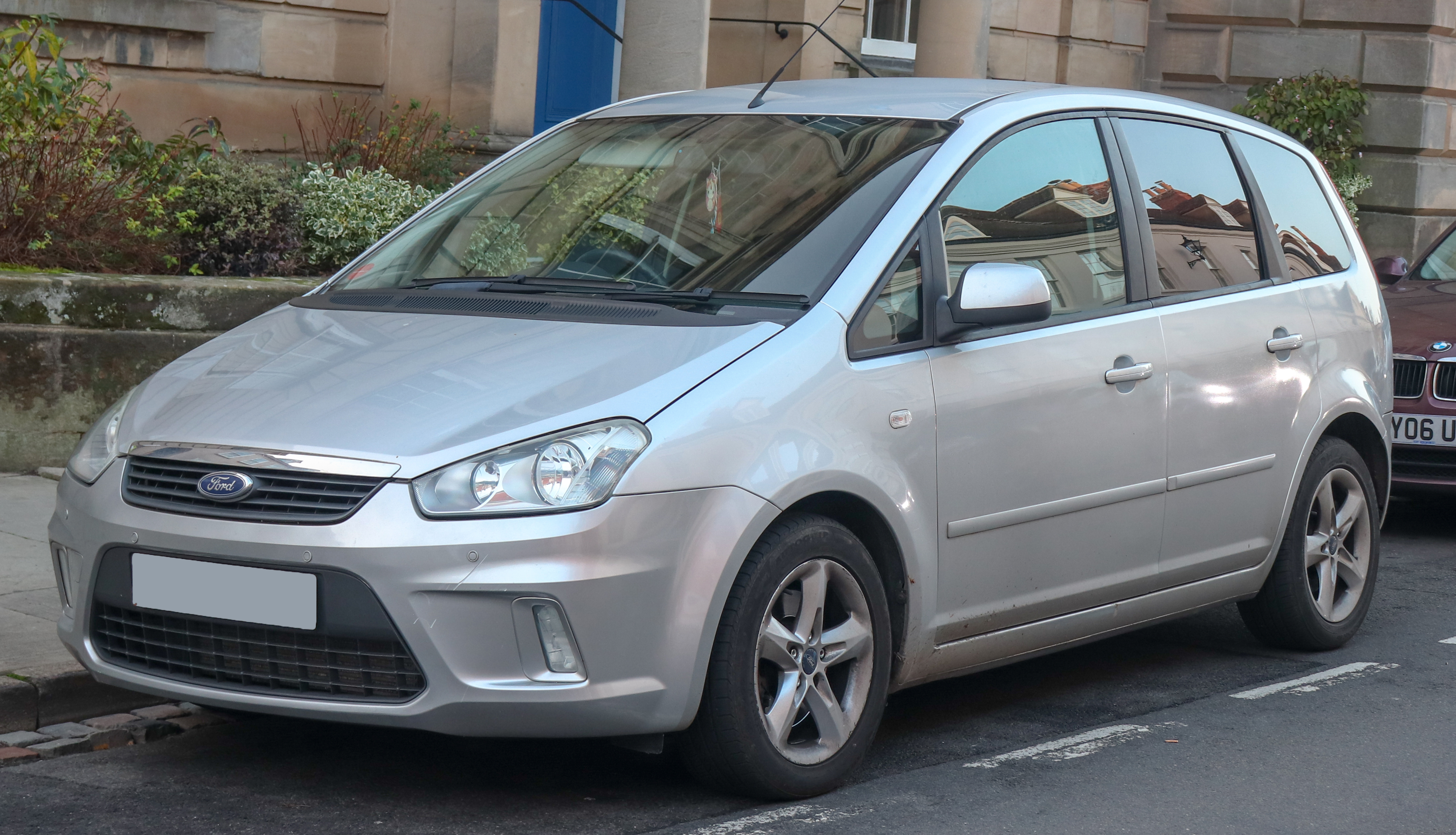
Facelift as C-Max

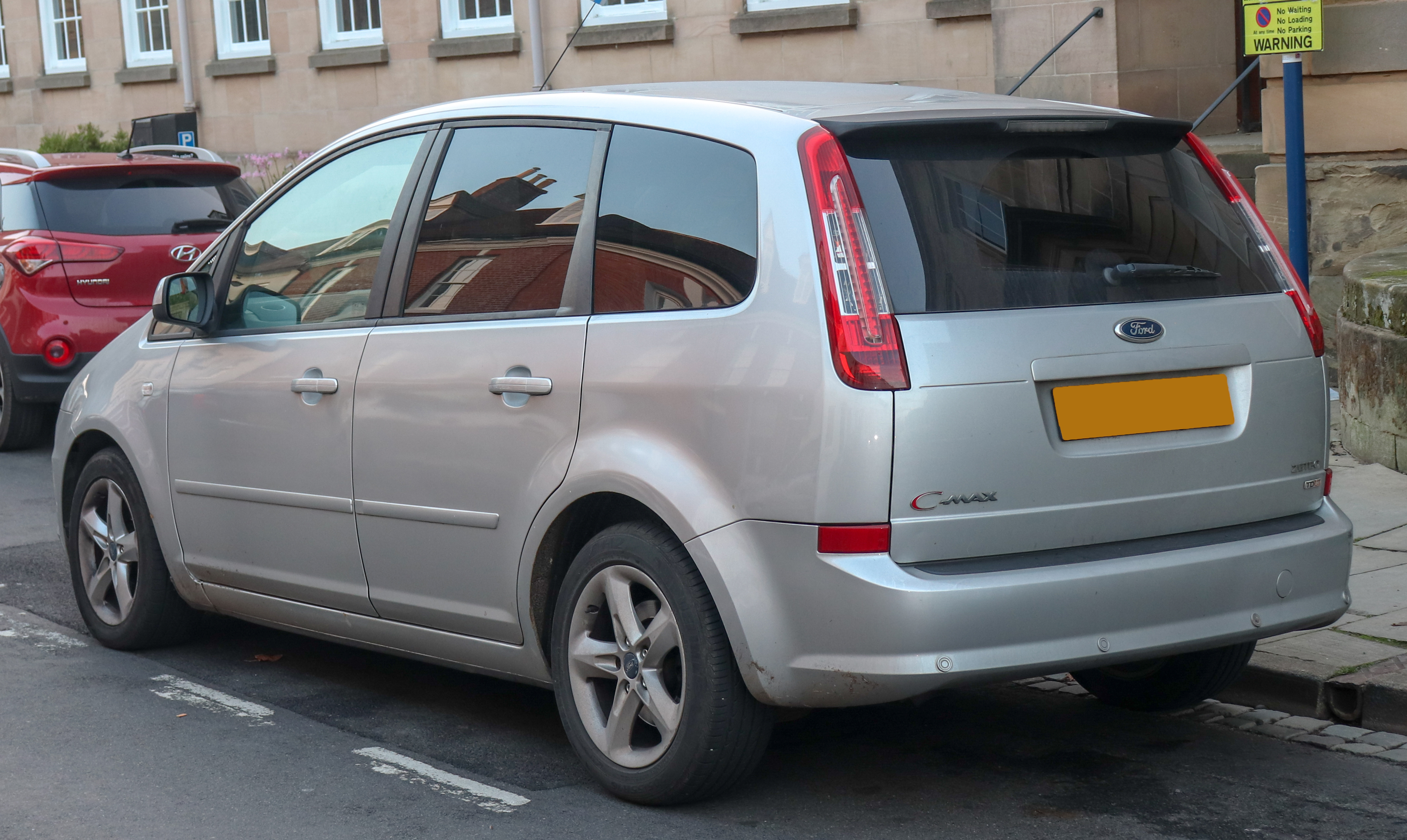
Facelift as C-Max

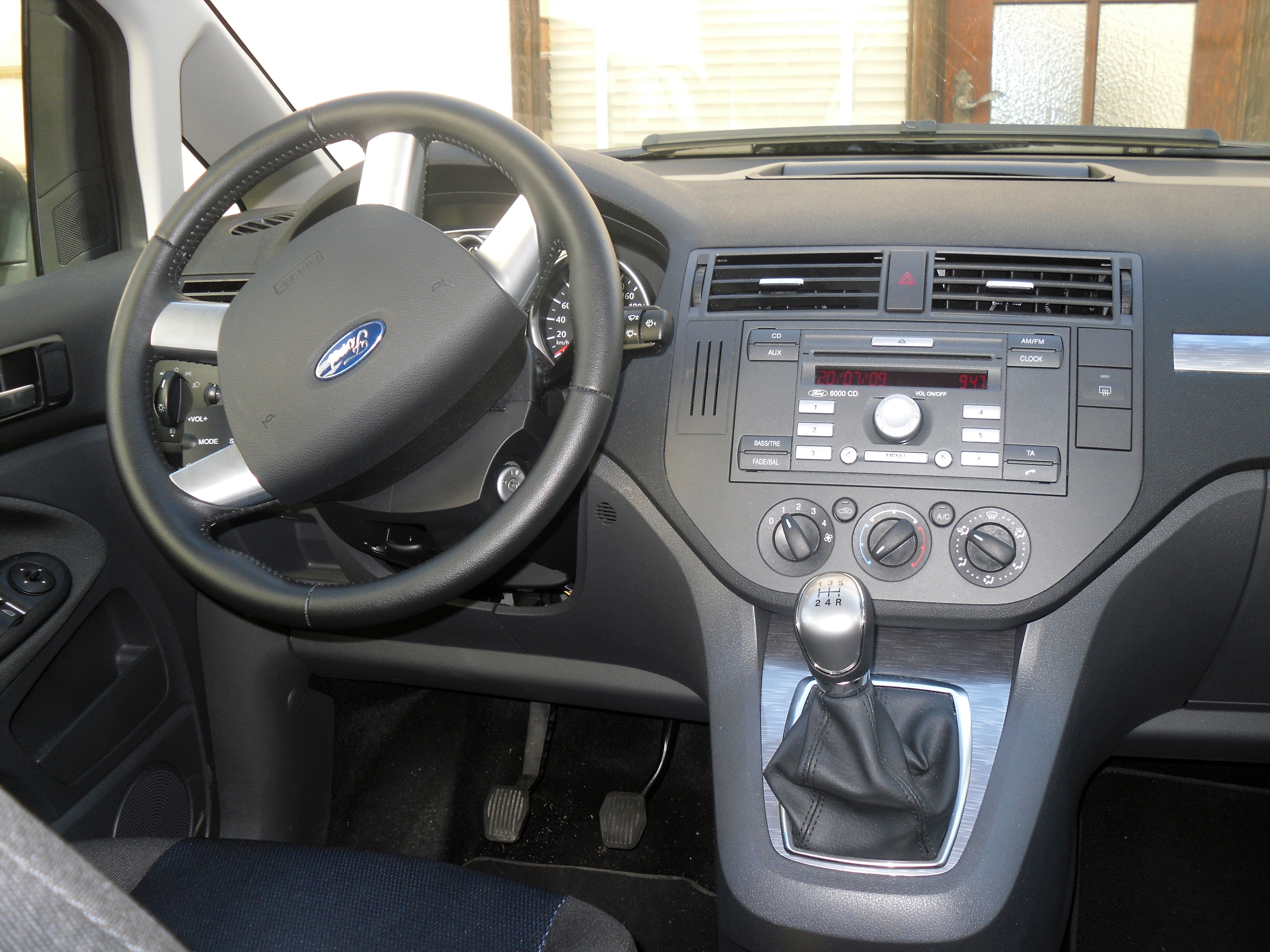
Interior

== Second generation (2011) ==
Second generation
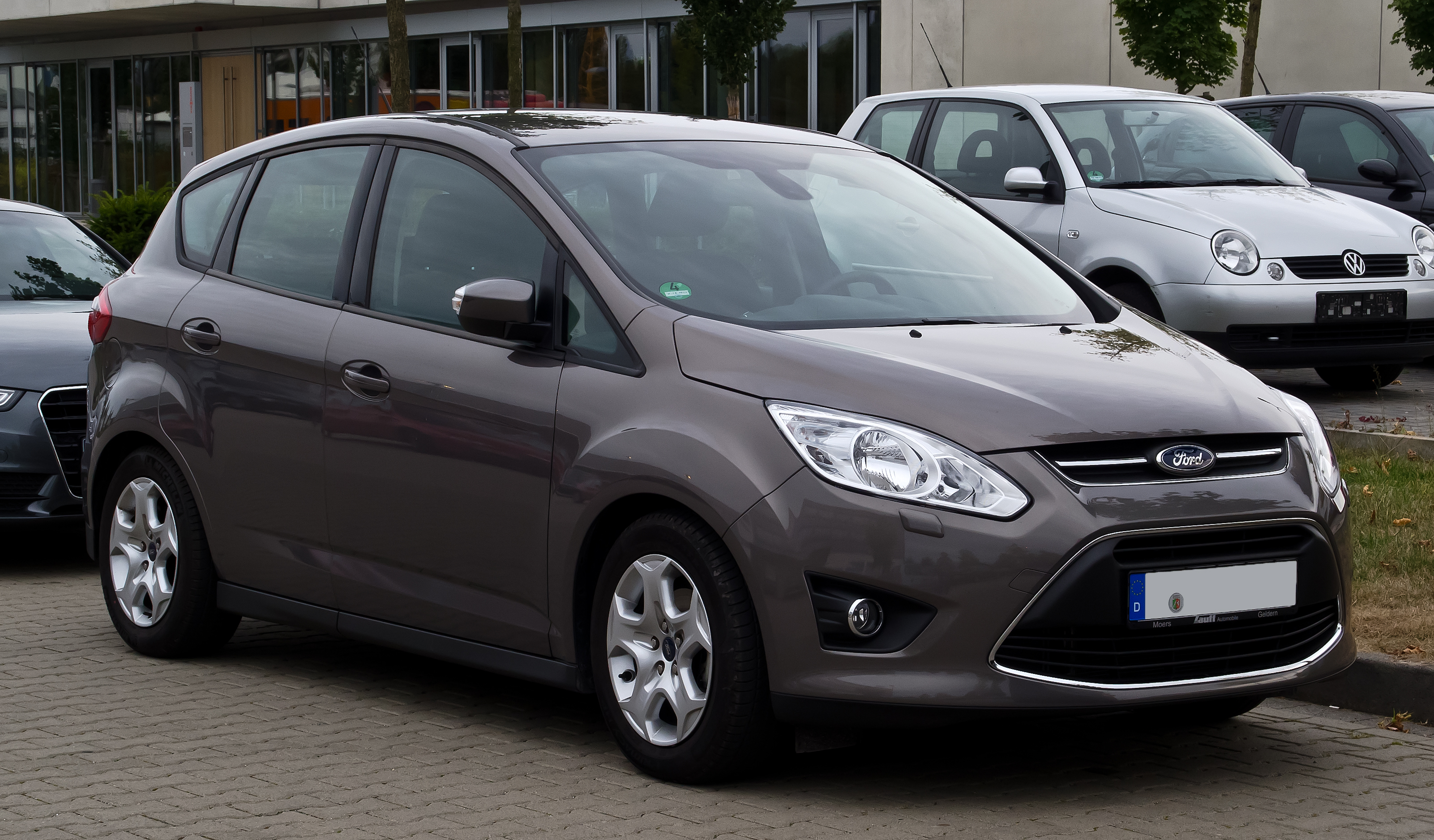

Overview
- Production: 2010–2019 (Europe); 2012–2018 (United States)
- Model years: 2013–2018 (US)
- Assembly: Spain: Valencia (Ford Valencia); Germany: Saarlouis (Saarlouis Body & Assembly); United States: Wayne, Michigan (hybrid)

Body and chassis
- Platform: Ford Global C platform
- Related: Ford Focus Mk III

Powertrain
- Engine: Petrol: 1.0 L EcoBoost SCTi turbo I3; 1.5 L EcoBoost SCTi turbo I4; 1.6 L Duratec Ti-VCT I4; 1.6 L EcoBoost SCTi turbo I4; Diesel: 1.5 L Duratorq TDCi I4; 1.6 L Duratorq TDCi I4; 2.0 L Duratorq TDCi I4
- Transmission: 5-speed iB5 manual 6-speed B6/MMT6 manual 6-speed Durashift automatic 6-speed PowerShift dual-clutch automatic

Dimensions
- Wheelbase: C-Max: 2,648 mm (104.3 in); Grand C-Max: 2,788 mm (109.8 in)
- Length: C-Max: 4,380 mm (172.4 in); Grand C-Max: 4,520 mm (178.0 in)
- Width: 1,828 mm (72.0 in)
- Height: C-Max: 1,626 mm (64.0 in); Grand C-Max: 1,684 mm (66.3 in)
- Curb weight: C-Max: 1,374–1,550 kg (3,029–3,417 lb); Grand C-Max: 1,477–1,697 kg (3,256–3,741 lb)

Alongside the third-generation Ford Focus Mk III, the second-generation C-Max (C344) is built on Ford's new Global C platform. The appearance is inspired by the Iosis Max concept, shown at the 2009 Geneva Motor Show. In addition, Ford added a long-wheelbase, seven-seat minivan variant of the C-Max, the Ford Grand C-Max.

The vehicle was presented at the 2009 Frankfurt Motor Show. Early European models include 5 seats, and 7-seat models entered the market at the end of 2010 (except Russia, where there is only the 7-seat model). At the 2011 North American International Auto Show, Ford announced a seven-seat C-MAX for the North American market, but this model was cancelled prior to launch.

Ford unveiled the Ford C-Max Energi plug-in hybrid and the C-Max Hybrid at the 2011 North American International Auto Show. Like the conventional C-Max, the C-Max Energi and Hybrid are five-seat only. They replace the Ford Escape Hybrid and Mercury Mariner Hybrid since Ford discontinued the Mercury brand after the 2011 model year and the Escape Hybrid after the 2012 year model. The C-Max is Ford's first hybrid-only line of vehicles. Both the plug-in and hybrid versions are based on the European gasoline- and diesel-powered versions.

The C-Max Hybrid was released in the United States in September 2012 as a 2013 model, followed by the release of the plug-in Energi version by mid-October 2012.

Production of the C-Max Energi in the United States ended in September 2017, while Hybrid production ended in 2018.

=== Features ===
The new Mk III platform is the first in its class to support torque vectoring control.

The redesigned C-Max features flat folding third-row seats, a hands-free power lift gate, rear-view camera, park assist, and panoramic sunroof. HD radio, Sirius XM, Sync, dual-zone climate control system, and a navigation system come as standard or as available options on the different trim lines.

The aerodynamics (drag coefficient, c_{w}) of the car has been improved, being 0,30 for the five-seater and 0,32 for the Grand C-Max.

=== Conventional engines and transmissions ===
Like the previous C-Max, the new C-Max also came with a range of petrol and diesel four-cylinder engines, which were shared with the Focus:

- The 1.0 L Ecoboost comes available in two states of tune, alongside the 1.6 - 100 and 125 hp (75 and 93 kW; 101 and 127 PS) guises.
- The 1.6 L naturally aspirated Duratec Ti-VCT was available in three output levels.
- The 1.6 L EcoBoost came in two different variants, the same as in the Focus.
- The 1.5 L EcoBoost replaced the earlier 1.6 in April 2015; its power and torque figures are identical to the 1.6.
- The 1.6 L eight-valve Duratorq TDCi Ford/PSA-made diesels were upgraded; Ford's 1.8 L Endura engine was no longer available.
- The 1.5 L 16-valve Duratorq TDCi replaced the earlier 1.6 in April 2015.
- The 2.0 16-valve Duratorq TDCi Ford/PSA-made diesels came in three different output levels; as of April 2015, this engine was overhauled and then only two versions were available.

Model/engine	Capacity	Cylinders/valves	Power/rpm	Torque/rpm	Dates
1.0 Ecoboost	999	3/12	100 PS (99 hp; 74 kW) at 6000	170 N⋅m (125 lb⋅ft; 17 kg⋅m) at 1500-4500	September 2012 – June 2019
1.0 Ecoboost	999	3/12	125 PS (123 hp; 92 kW) at 6000	170 N⋅m (125 lb⋅ft; 17 kg⋅m) at 1500-4500	September 2012 – June 2019
1.6 Duratec Ti-VCT	1,596	4/16	85 PS (84 hp; 63 kW)	141 N⋅m (104 lb⋅ft; 14 kg⋅m) at 2500	October 2010 – March 2018
1.6 Duratec Ti-VCT	1,596	4/16	105 PS (104 hp; 77 kW) at 6000	150 N⋅m (111 lb⋅ft; 15 kg⋅m) at 4000-4500	October 2010 – May 2014
1.6 Duratec Ti-VCT	1,596	4/16	125 PS (123 hp; 92 kW) at 6000	159 N⋅m (117 lb⋅ft; 16 kg⋅m) at 4000	October 2010 – May 2014
1.5 EcoBoost	1,499	4/16	150 PS (148 hp; 110 kW) at 6000	240 N⋅m (177 lb⋅ft; 24 kg⋅m) at 1600-4000	April 2015 – June 2019
1.5 EcoBoost	1,499	4/16	182 PS (180 hp; 134 kW) at 6000	240 N⋅m (24 kg⋅m; 177 lb⋅ft) at 1600-5000	April 2015 – July 2018
1.6 EcoBoost	1,596	4/16	150 PS (148 hp; 110 kW) at 5700	240 or 270 N⋅m (177 or 199 lb⋅ft; 24 or 28 kg⋅m) at 1600-4000 (Note: overboost)	October 2010 – March 2015
1.6 EcoBoost	1,596	4/16	182 PS (180 hp; 134 kW) at 5700	240 or 270 N⋅m (177 or 199 lb⋅ft; 24 or 28 kg⋅m) at 1600-5000	October 2010 – March 2015
Model/engine	Capacity	Cylinders/valves	Power/rpm	Torque/rpm	Dates
1.5 Duratorq	1,499	4/16	95 PS (94 hp; 70 kW) at 3600	250 N⋅m (184 lb⋅ft; 25 kg⋅m) at 1750-2500	April 2015 – June 2019
1.5 Duratorq	1,499	4/16	105 PS (104 hp; 77 kW) at 3600	270 N⋅m (199 lb⋅ft; 28 kg⋅m) at 1750	April 2015 – March 2018
1.5 Duratorq	1,499	4/16	120 PS (118 hp; 88 kW) at 3600	270 or 300 N⋅m (199 or 221 lb⋅ft; 28 or 31 kg⋅m) at 1750-2500 (Note: with Powershift double-clutch transmission)	April 2015 – June 2019
1.6 Duratorq	1,560	4/8	95 PS (94 hp; 70 kW) at 3600	230 N⋅m (170 lb⋅ft; 23 kg⋅m) at 1500-2000	October 2010 – March 2015
1.6 Duratorq	1,560	4/8	115 PS (113 hp; 85 kW) at 3600	270 or 285 N⋅m (199 or 210 lb⋅ft; 28 or 29 kg⋅m) at 1750-2500	October 2010 – March 2015
2.0 Duratorq	1,997	4/16	115 PS (113 hp; 85 kW) at 3750	300 N⋅m (221 lb⋅ft; 31 kg⋅m) at 1500-2250	October 2010 – March 2015
2.0 Duratorq	1,997	4/16	140 PS (138 hp; 103 kW) at 3750	320 N⋅m (236 lb⋅ft; 33 kg⋅m) at 1750-2750	October 2010 – March 2015
2.0 Duratorq	1,997	4/16	163 PS (161 hp; 120 kW) at 3750	340 N⋅m (251 lb⋅ft; 35 kg⋅m) at 2000-3250	October 2010 – March 2015
2.0 Duratorq	1,997	4/16	150 PS (148 hp; 110 kW) at 3500	370 N⋅m (273 lb⋅ft; 38 kg⋅m) at 2000	April 2015 – June 2019
2.0 Duratorq	1,997	4/16	170 PS (168 hp; 125 kW) at 3500 (Note: automatic only)	400 N⋅m (295 lb⋅ft; 41 kg⋅m) at 2000-2750	April 2015 – June 2019

Transmissions mated with the engines are the Ford IB5 (1.6 Duratec Ti-VCT), B6 (1.6 EcoBoost/1.6 Duratorq), Durashift MMT6 (2.0 Duratorq) manual, and Ford Powershift double-clutch transmission available with the 2.0 Duratorq engine.

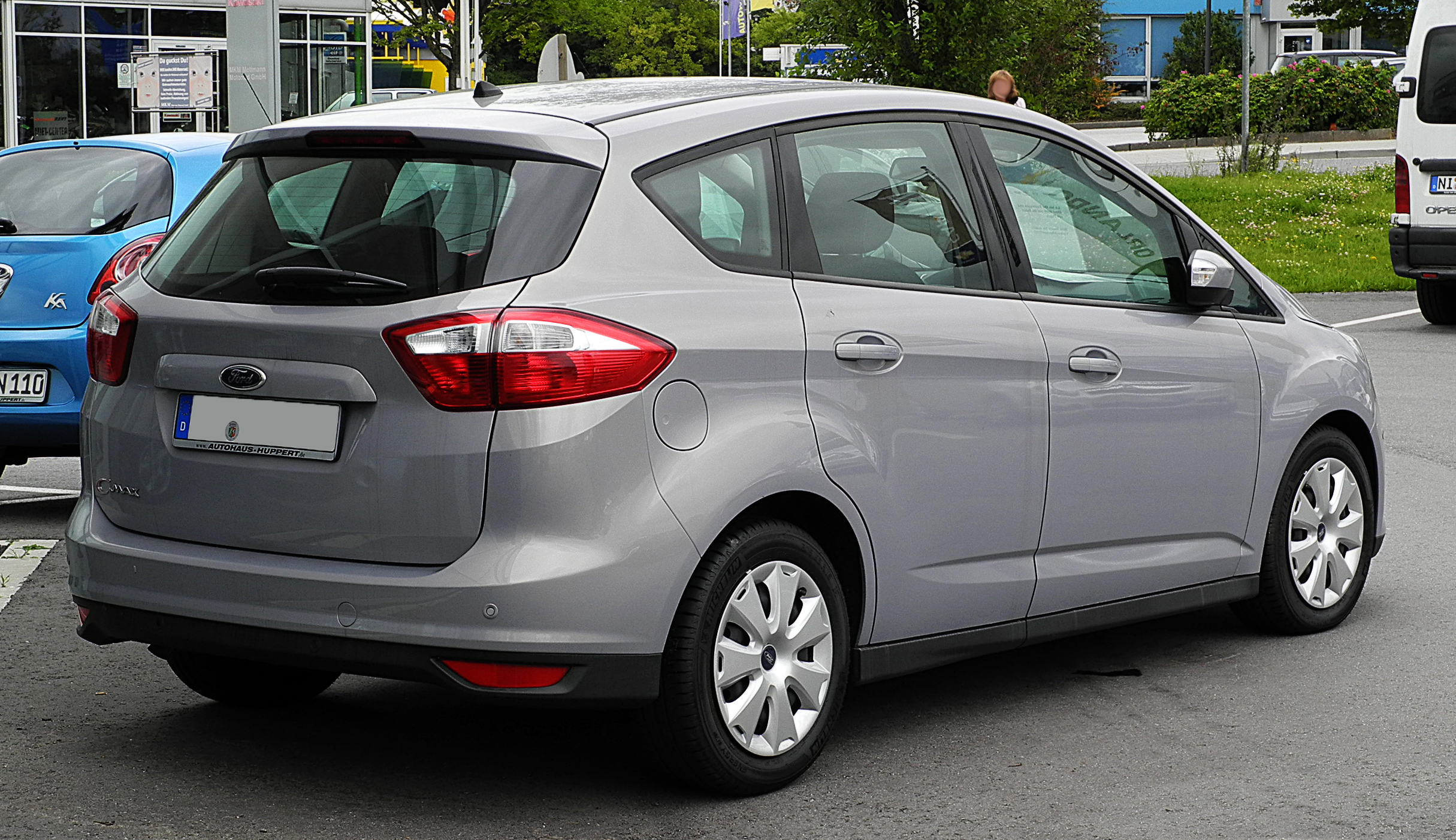
Ford C-Max

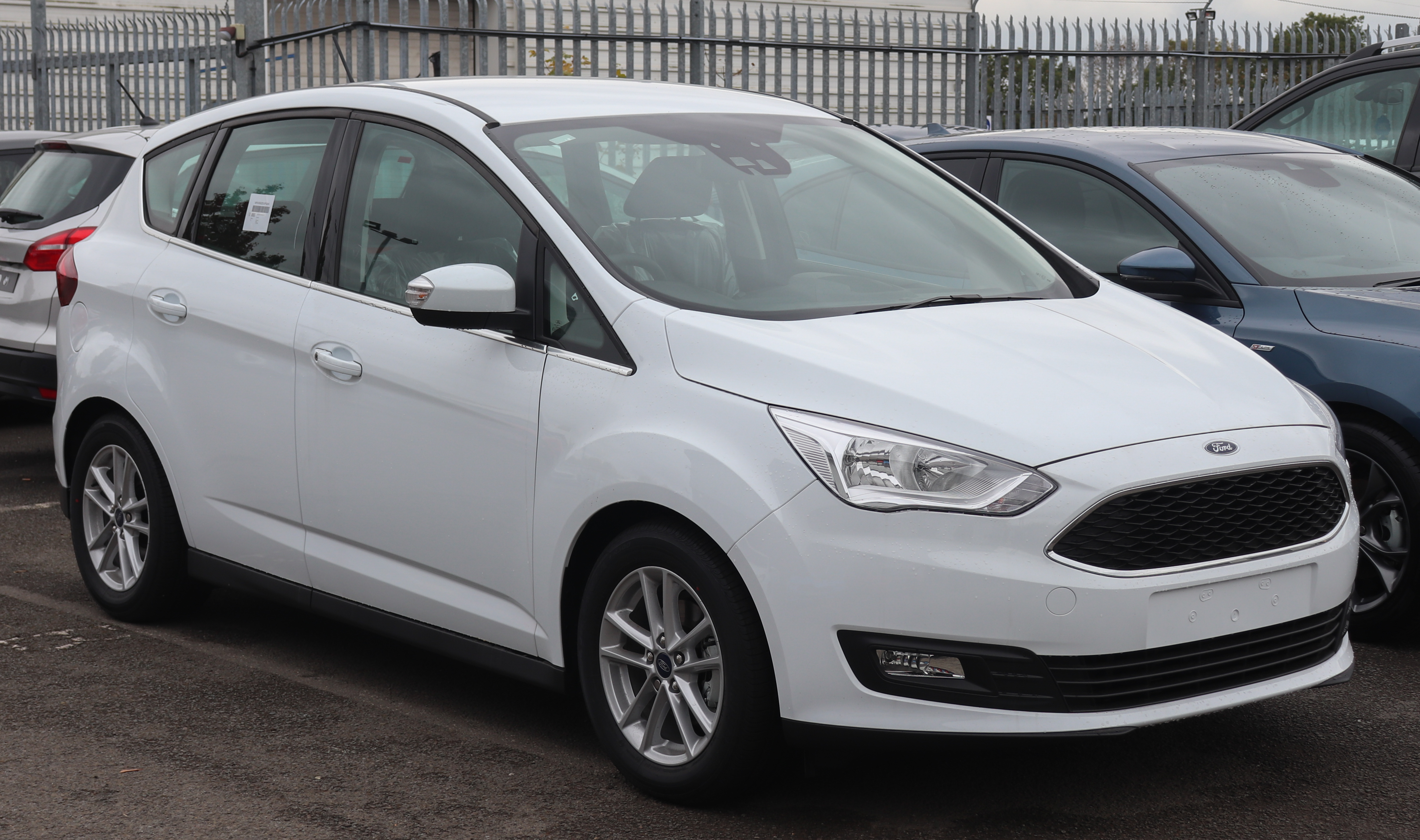
Ford C-Max facelift

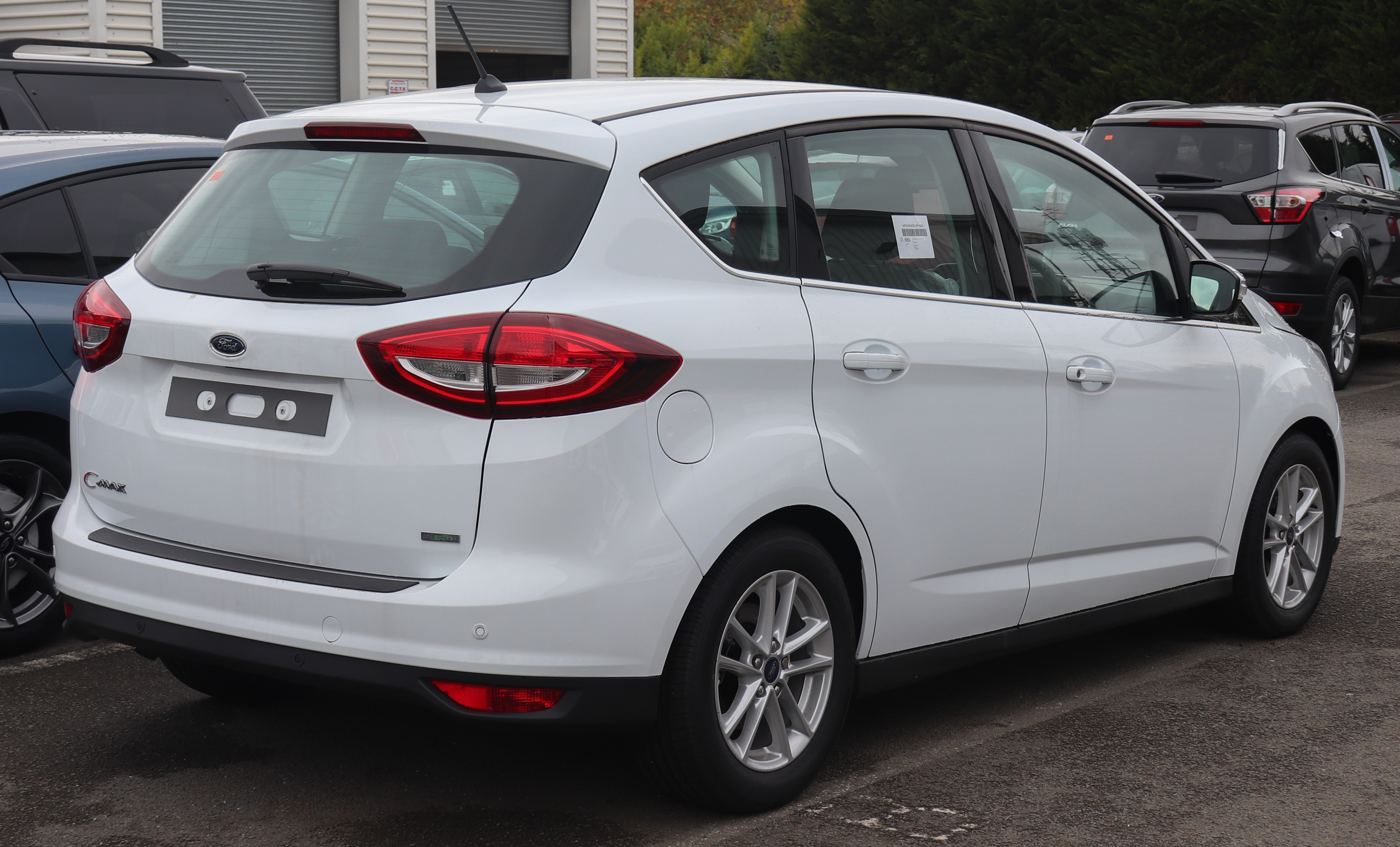
Ford C-Max facelift

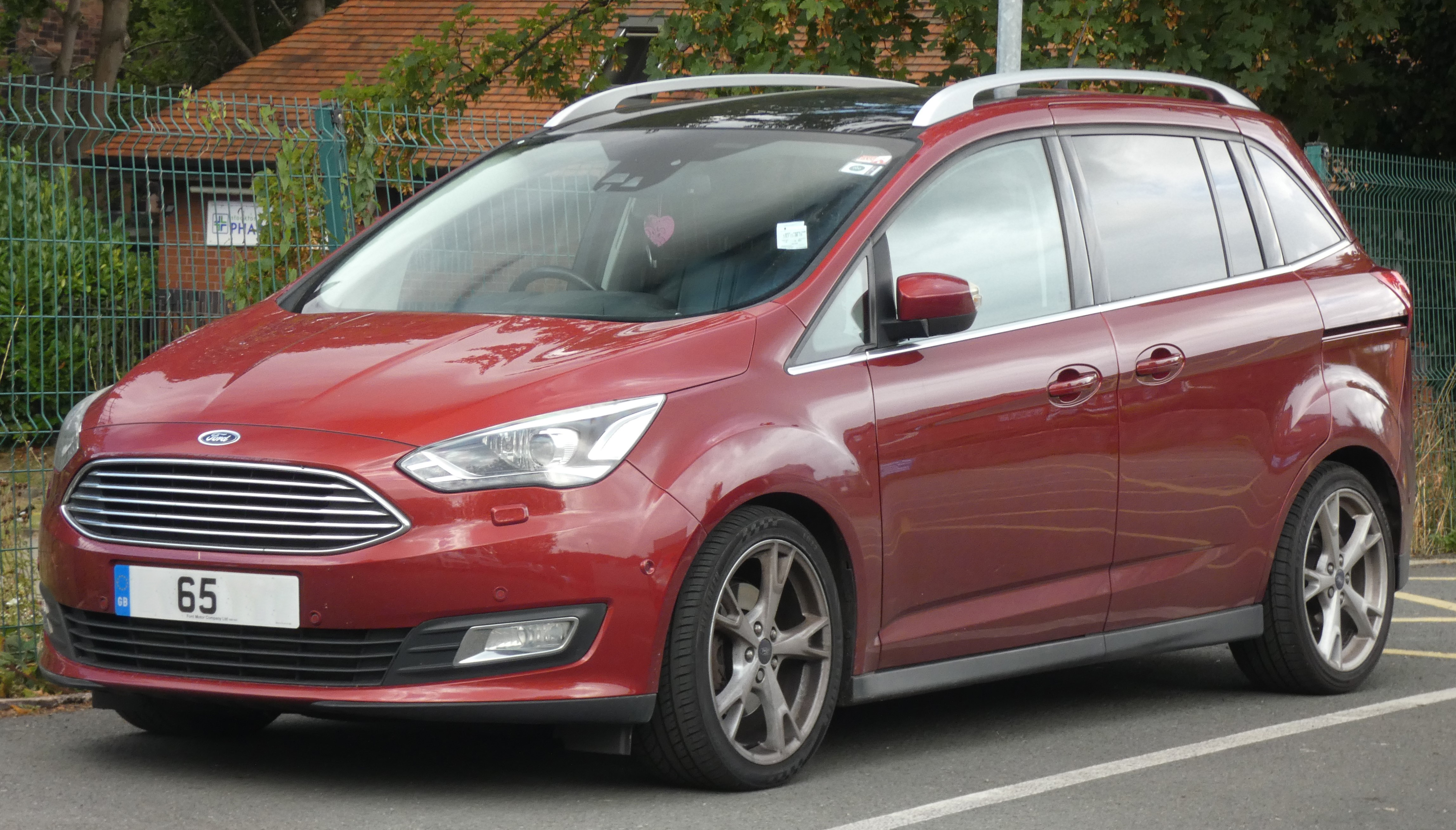
Ford Grand C-Max facelift

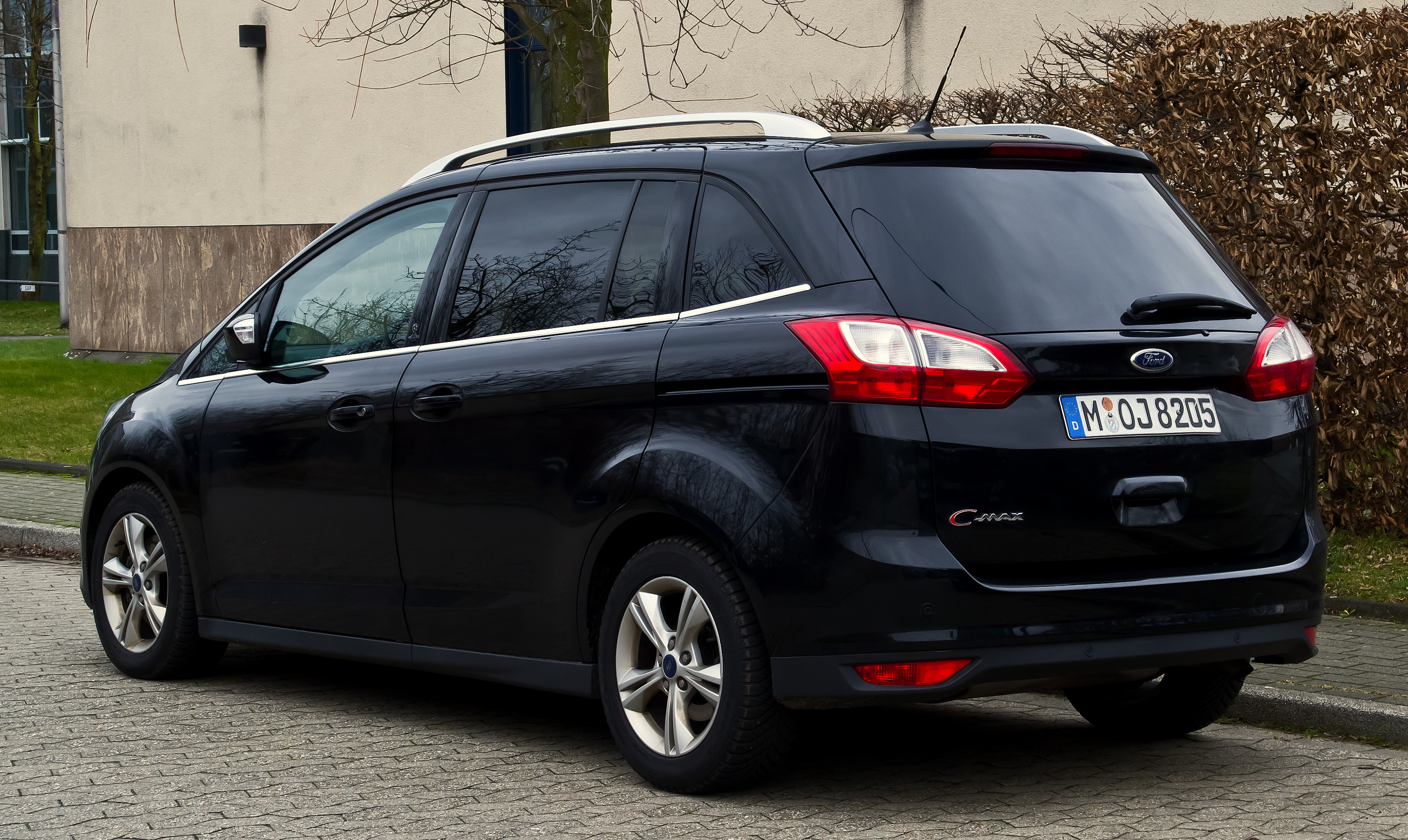
Ford Grand C-Max

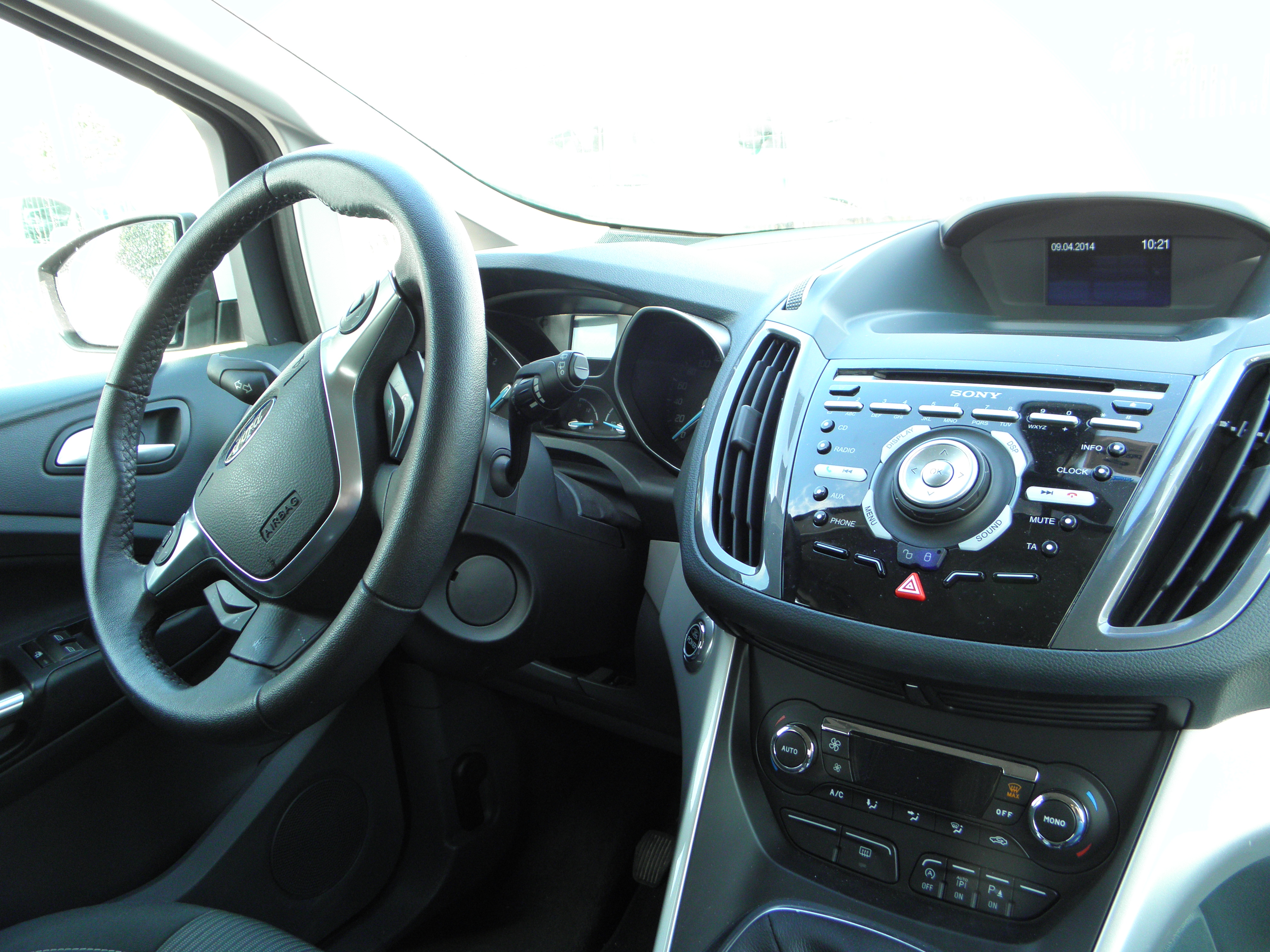
Dashboard

The Ford C-MAX was facelifted in 2015 and the 1.6 Ecoboost changed to the three-cylinder 1.0 Ecoboost along with the 1.6 TDCI 115PS Duratorq changing to the 1.5 TDCI single-overhead-cam unit.

=== Hybrid ===
Ford developed the C-Max Hybrid with the aim to become "America’s most affordable hybrid utility vehicle." The gasoline-electric hybrid model base pricing started at US$24,995, including destination and delivery.

==== Specifications ====
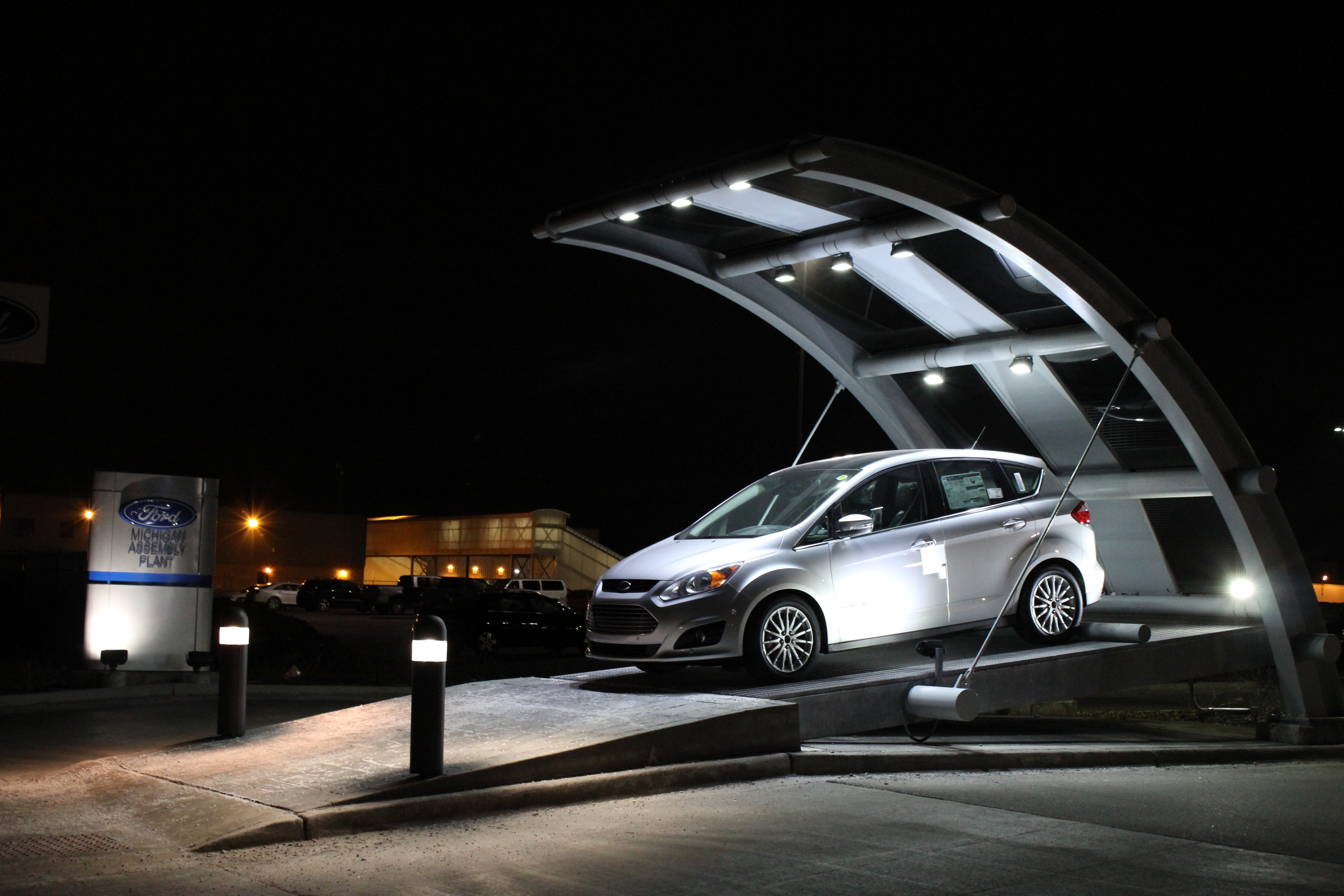
Ford C-Max Hybrid on display at the entrance to Ford's Wayne Stamping & Assembly plant

The front-wheel drive hybrid has a 2.0-liter four-cylinder Atkinson cycle engine mated to an 88kW electric traction motor and a 1.4 kWh lithium-ion battery for total system power output of 188 horsepower (140 kW; 191 PS). The top speed in all-electric mode of 65 mph (105 km/h) and the car's top speed in hybrid mode is 115 mph (185 km/h).

The hybrid has a maximum cargo volume of 52.6 cu ft (1,490 L) with rear seats folded flat, and 24.5 cu ft (690 L) in the cargo area behind the rear seats, providing more room than the regular Prius liftback, but less cargo room than the Prius V, which provides 67.3 cu ft (1,910 L) with the rear seats folded.

The Hybrid is offered in two trims:

The SE features eco-friendly cloth seating surfaces, Ford SYNC system with A/M-F/M stereo with single-disc CD/MP3 player, USB and auxiliary input jacks, six speakers, a multi-informational gauge cluster and color display screen, keyless entry, alloy wheels, and split-folding rear bench seat, plus a security alarm.

The SEL adds leather seating surfaces, MyFord Touch with AM/FM HD radio stereo with single-disc CD/MP3 player and USB and auxiliary input jacks, a Sony premium surround sound system, SIRIUS Satellite Radio, power dual front seats, keyless access, push-button start system, and other luxury features. For the 2017 model year, the SEL trim level on both the C-Max Hybrid and Energi were renamed to the Titanium trim level and also all the 2017 Ford C-Max Hybrids and plug-in Energis were expected to have restyled headlights and taillights.

The Energi Plug-In Hybrid was only available in SEL trim, but for the 2017 model year, the C-Max Energi was also available on the SE trim level.

==== EPA ratings ====
Ford's design aimed for the C-Max Hybrid to deliver better fuel economy than the Toyota Prius V. Ford had reduced its estimated fuel economy twice, once in 2013 and again in 2014, with the second revision placing fuel economy below the Prius V. The US Environmental Protection Agency (EPA) initially rated the hybrid model at 47 mpg_{‑US} (5.0 L/100 km; 56 mpg_{‑imp}) with the same rating for combined/city/highway cycles. These ratings allowed the C-Max Hybrid to improve the fuel economy of the Toyota Prius v by 3 mpg_{‑US} (78 L/100 km; 3.6 mpg_{‑imp}) on the city cycle, by 7 mpg_{‑US} (34 L/100 km; 8.4 mpg_{‑imp}) on the highway cycle and by 5 mpg_{‑US} (47 L/100 km; 6.0 mpg_{‑imp}) combined. However, after criticism and lawsuits about worse-than-expected real-world fuel economy, in August 2013 Ford voluntarily lowered the EPA ratings and issued customer rebates. The revised fuel economy ratings were reduced to 45 mpg_{‑US} (5.2 L/100 km; 54 mpg_{‑imp}) for city driving, 43 mpg_{‑US} (5.5 L/100 km; 52 mpg_{‑imp}) for combined and 40 mpg_{‑US} (5.9 L/100 km; 48 mpg_{‑imp}) for highway. The revised rating for the updated 2013 C-Max Hybrid is still better than the 42 mpg_{‑US} (5.6 L/100 km; 50 mpg_{‑imp}) combined rating for the Toyota Prius v. A second downward revision was made during June 2014.

Ford boosted the on-road fuel efficiency of its three 2013 model year hybrids through changes in the cars' vehicle control software in an effort to improve customer satisfaction. The upgrade was offered free of charge to existing owners of these hybrids. Some of the changes include:

- Increasing the maximum pure electric speed from 62 to 85 mph (100 to 137 km/h), allowing increased use of electric-only mode on the highway
- Optimizing the use of active grille shutters to reduce aerodynamic drag under more driving and temperature conditions, including cold weather, during air conditioner use, and when the engine coolant temperature is higher
- Reducing the electric fan speed as a function of coolant temperature to minimize the fan’s energy consumption
- Shortening engine warm-up time by up to 50% to enable electric-only driving and engine shutdown at stops sooner after cold starts
- Optimizing the climate-control system to minimize use of the air-conditioning compressor and reduce the energy used in cold-weather operation

==== Sales ====
A total of 969 units was sold during September 2012, allowing the C-Max Hybrid to rank as the ninth-best selling hybrid car in the United States that month. During October, its first full month in the market, 3,182 units were sold, outselling the Prius V by more than 400 units, which had ranked as the fourth-most sold hybrid in the previous months. Sales of the C-Max Hybrid also led Ford to achieve its best October hybrid sales month ever with a total of 4,612 sales, up 142% over October 2011. Ford reported that 25% of C-Max Hybrid sales took place in California, with Los Angeles and San Francisco as the top-selling regional markets. A total of 10,935 C-Max Hybrids were sold during 2012, and a total of 28,056 units in 2013. After Ford cut the car's EPA fuel economy rating by 4 mpg_{‑US} (59 L/100 km; 4.8 mpg_{‑imp}) to 43 mpg_{‑US} (5.5 L/100 km; 52 mpg_{‑imp}) in the middle of 2012, the car experienced its three worst sales months since it debuted in the U.S. Since its inception, a total of 72,330 units had been sold in the United States through December 2015.

==== Fuel economy controversies ====
In December 2012, Motor Trend reported that Consumer Reports magazine and Green Car Reports have found that the 2013 Ford C-Max Hybrid and 2013 Ford Fusion Hybrid, which share the same powertrain, do not deliver their triple 47 mpg_{‑US} (5.0 L/100 km; 56 mpg_{‑imp}) EPA ratings in real-world use. After running both vehicles through Consumer Reports real-world tests, the magazine found that C-Max hybrid achieved a combined fuel economy average of 37 mpg_{‑US} (6.4 L/100 km; 44 mpg_{‑imp}), with 35 mpg_{‑US} (6.7 L/100 km; 42 mpg_{‑imp}) and 38 mpg_{‑US} (6.2 L/100 km; 46 mpg_{‑imp}) for city and highway. Green Car Reports found that the C-Max delivered 37 mpg_{‑US} (6.4 L/100 km; 44 mpg_{‑imp}) over 50 mi (80 km) of mixed freeway and urban driving, and 40 mpg_{‑US} (5.9 L/100 km; 48 mpg_{‑imp}) over 240 mi (390 km) mostly at freeway speeds.

Consumer Reports concluded that the overall fuel economy for the C-Max Hybrid is off by 10 mpg_{‑US} (24 L/100 km; 12 mpg_{‑imp}), representing a deviation of about 20%. The consumer magazine said that their overall fuel economy results are usually close to the EPA's combined-mpg estimate, and among current models tested, more than 80% fall within 2 mpg_{‑US} (120 L/100 km; 2.4 mpg_{‑imp}) margin. The largest discrepancy the magazine has previously found was 7 and 6 mpg_{‑US} (34 and 39 L/100 km; 8.4 and 7.2 mpg_{‑imp}) for the Toyota Prius C and the Prius hatchback, respectively. Ford responded in a statement, saying, "Early C-MAX Hybrid and Fusion Hybrid customers praise the vehicles and report a range of fuel economy figures, including some reports above 47 mpg_{‑US} (5.0 L/100 km; 56 mpg_{‑imp}). This reinforces the fact that driving styles, driving conditions, and other factors can cause mileage to vary."

A few days later, the Environmental Protection Agency (EPA) said it would review claims that two new Ford hybrid vehicles were not delivering the advertised 47 mpg. Linc Wehrly, Director of Light-duty Vehicle Center Compliance Division at EPA's National Vehicle and Fuel Emissions Laboratory in Ann Arbor, Michigan, commented that hybrids had far more variability in miles per gallon than conventional vehicles. All vehicles are run through the same EPA fuel-efficiency tests, but they are not administered by the EPA; instead, the automakers conduct the test and EPA often conducts reviews. Most vehicles' real-world gas mileage levels are less than the EPA sticker number, and can often be 20% less. depending on speed, temperature, and other factors. The EPA explained that with hybrids, the gap was much wider, as high as 30%.

The problem lay with EPA's rules that allowed automakers to group similar vehicles and apply the same ratings, which Ford did with the Fusion hybrid and C-Max hybrids.

Ford Motor Co. officials said the real-world fuel efficiency in the C-Max Hybrid depended on driving style and other factors, and that the company did not expect the car's fuel efficiency numbers to change, as they followed EPA's test guidelines. Ford said they were working closely with the EPA to determine if their hybrid vehicle testing procedures needed to be changed. They explained that several factors could affect hybrid fuel economy more than that of regular gasoline engines, including speed (as the difference between 75 and 65 miles per hour (121 and 105 km/h) could produce a 7 mpg difference in fuel economy); outside temperature (the difference between 40 and 70 °F (4 and 21 °C) could result in a 5 mpg difference); and vehicle break-in (a 5 mpg difference could occur from the difference 0 to 6 miles (0.0 to 9.7 km)).

Due to the criticism and lawsuits, in July 2013, Ford announced it would boost the on-road fuel efficiency of the C-Max and its other two 2013 hybrids through changes in the vehicle control software, in an effort to improve customer satisfaction. The carmaker voluntarily reduced the official EPA ratings in August 2013. It also announced it would issue rebates to some 32,000 C-Max owners, who would be notified by mail. The payment would be US$550 to U.S. customers who purchased C-Maxes, and US$325 to customers who had leased them.

After the Ford announcement, the EPA stated that it would update the test procedures used to assign fuel economy ratings to cars "to ensure that the requirements keep pace with industry trends and innovations in advanced high-efficiency vehicles." Ford used the Fusion Hybrid test to generate the fuel economy label for the C-Max Hybrid following EPA's rules. These, which date to the 1970s, specify that automakers can use the same fuel economy numbers for similar-sized vehicles equipped with the same engines and transmissions. The EPA requires automakers to test the fuel economy of the biggest-selling model in a specific category. In its midsized hybrid class, Ford tested the Fusion sedan version because it was the top seller, and Ford was allowed to apply the 47 mpg_{‑US} (5.0 L/100 km; 56 mpg_{‑imp}) achieved with the Fusion Hybrid in combined, city, and highway driving to the C-Max hybrid. Ford had no plans to change the fuel economy ratings on the 2013 Fusion hybrid.

In June 2014, Ford found some glitches in their internal tests and had to drop the MPG ratings by 1-2 miles per gallon for a few models like the 2013-2014 Fusion and C-Max hybrids, including the plug-ins. To mitigate customers' concerns, the automaker provided financial compensation. Depending on whether the vehicle was bought or leased, owners got from $150 to $1,050 to help cover the increase in fuel costs due to the new ratings.

=== Plug-in hybrid ===
Ford C-Max Energi
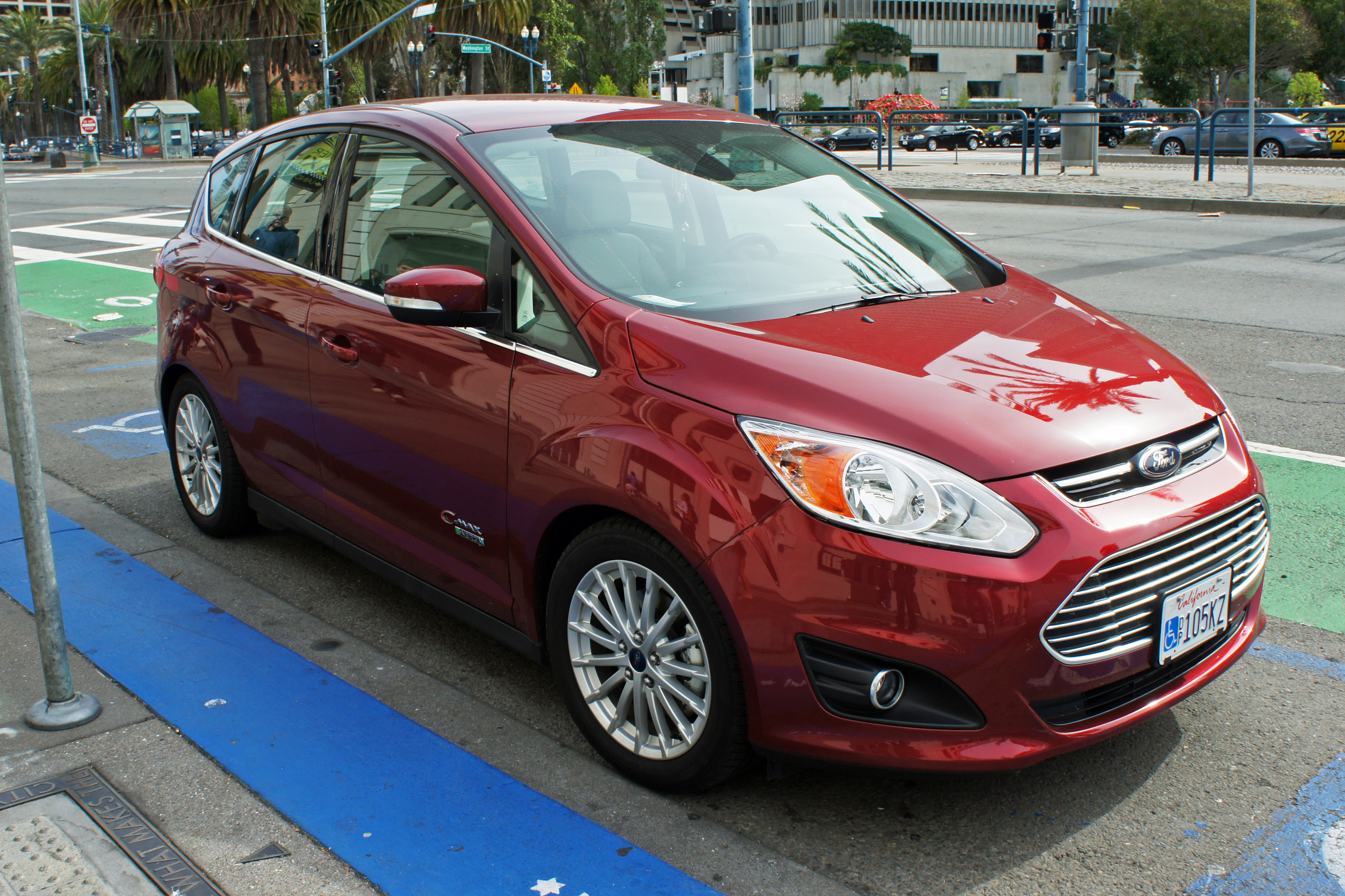

Overview
- Production: 2012–November 2017
- Model years: 2013–2017
- Assembly: United States: Wayne, Michigan

Body and chassis
- Related: Ford Fusion Energi

Powertrain
- Battery: 7.6 kWh lithium-ion
- Electric range: 20 mi (32 km)

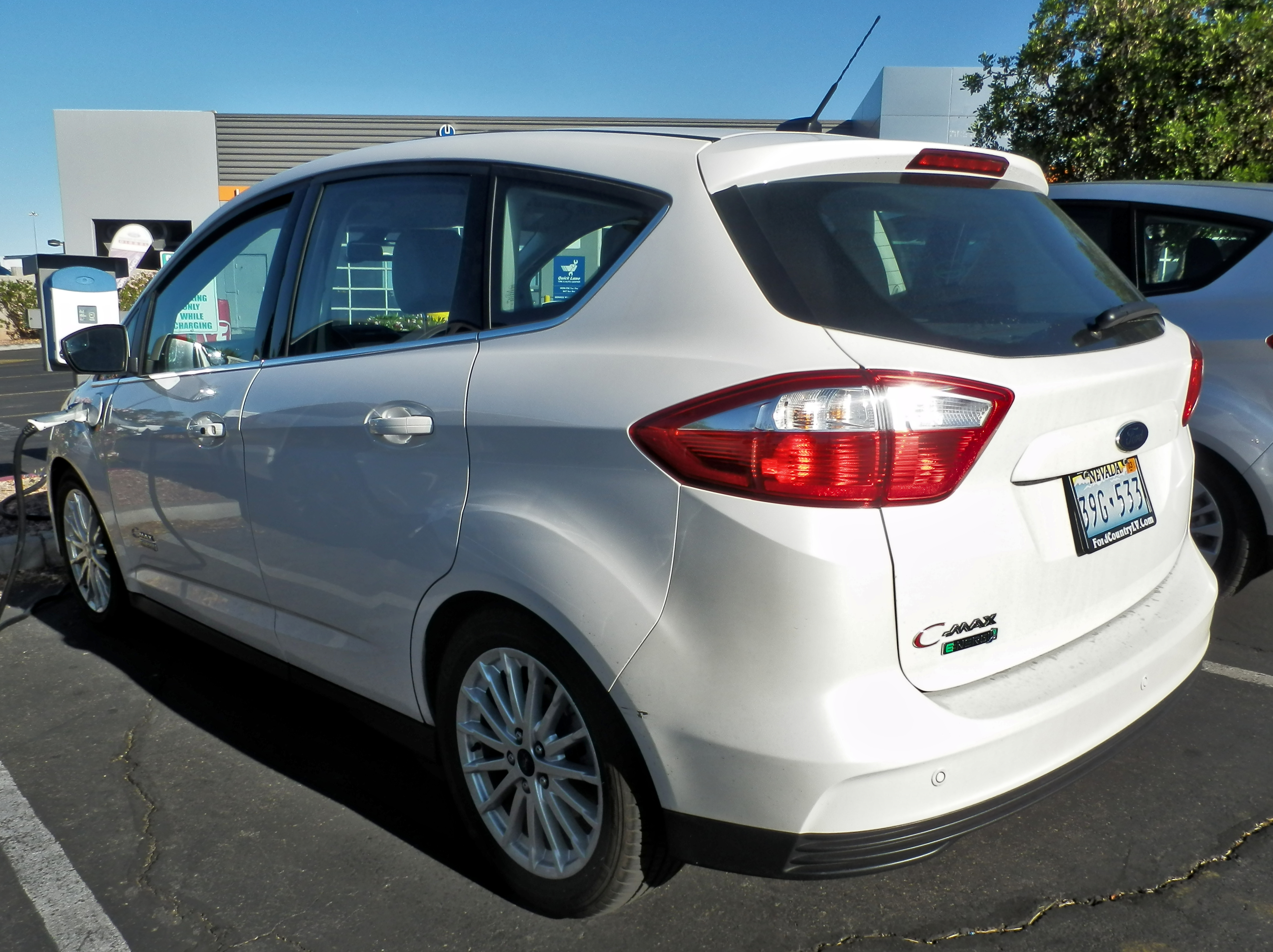
Rear view

The C-Max Energi plug-in hybrid started at US$27,995 including the destination fee. According to its battery size, the plug-in car qualified for a federal tax credit of US$4,007, and it was eligible for additional incentives at the state and local level, such as California's US$1,500 rebate.

==== Specifications ====
The C-Max Energi was designed with total 188 horsepower (140 kW; 191 PS) in hybrid mode delivered by a 2.0-liter Atkinson cycle four-cylinder gasoline engine plus an electric motor powered by a 7.6 kWh lithium-ion battery pack, which is smaller and lighter than nickel–metal hydride batteries used in previous Ford generation hybrids. The electric drivetrain can produce a peak power of 68 kW (91 hp; 92 PS), limited by the size of the electric motor and the power-delivery capability of the battery pack, and delivered a total system power of 195 horsepower (145 kW; 198 PS) in charge-depleting mode (EV mode). The C-Max Energi is capable of reaching a top electric-only speed of 85 mph (137 km/h), exceeding the Toyota Prius Plug-in Hybrid (Prius Prime in North America) by more than 20 mph (32 km/h). The top speed in hybrid mode is 115 mph (185 km/h).

The C-Max Energi uses a regenerative braking system capable of capturing and reusing more than 95% of the braking energy normally lost during the braking process. The charging time for the C-Max Energi is 7 hours with a 120-volt charger, and 2.5 hours with a 240-volt charger. The charge port has an LED light ring like the Ford Focus Electric and is located on the driver’s side and near the front of the car. The light ring illuminates to indicate charge status. The battery is covered by an 8-year or 100,000-mile (160,000 km) component warranty.

Via a button mounted in the center stack, drivers could select between three modes - electric-only driving without gasoline engine power ("EV Now" setting); normal hybrid mode where the powertrain blends electric and gasoline engine power as appropriate ("EV Auto" setting); or a battery-saving mode that reserves the battery power for later use ("EV Later" setting). Like the Ford Fusion Hybrid, the C-Max Energi is equipped with special gauges, marketed as SmartGauge with EcoGuide, that provides in-vehicle customizable displays, including instantaneous fuel economy readings and coaching functions to help drivers understand and optimize their fuel efficiency. The plug-in hybrid also features ECO Cruise which saves energy by relaxing acceleration compared to standard cruise control.

==== EPA ratings ====
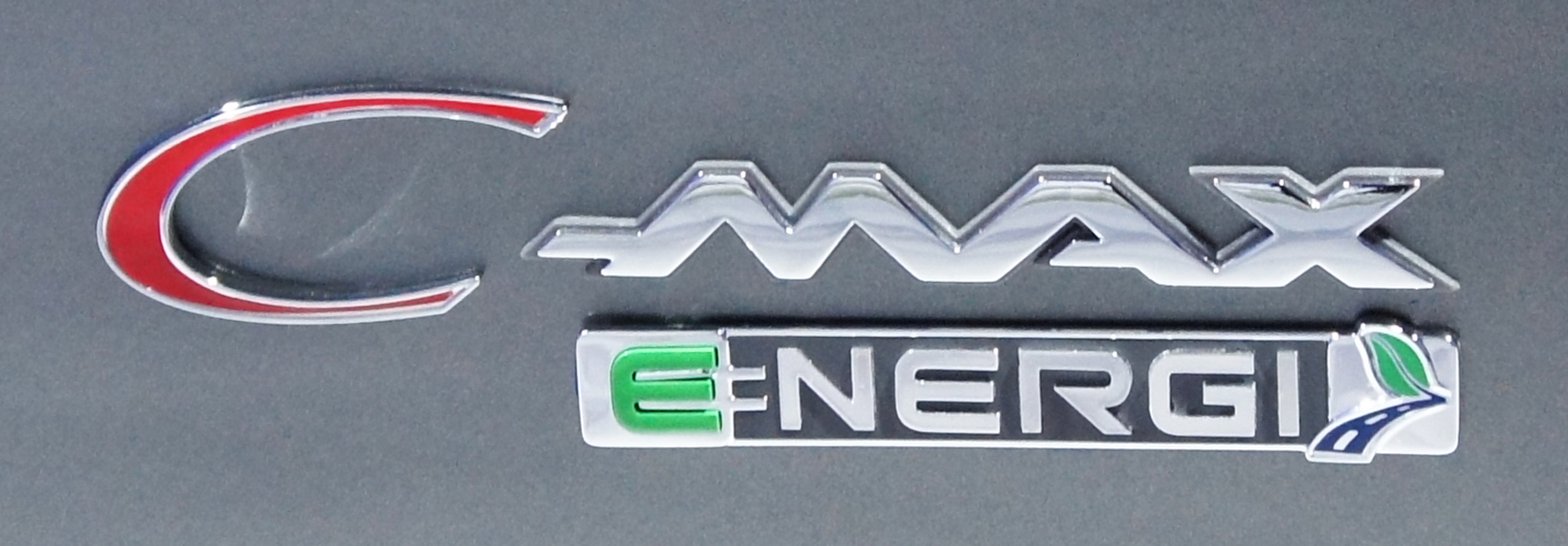
Ford C-Max Energi badge.

Ford designed the C-Max Energi plug-in hybrid to deliver better miles per gallon equivalent (MPG-e) in all-electric mode than the Toyota Prius Plug-in Hybrid. Initially, the EPA rated the Energi combined city/highway fuel economy in all-electric mode at 100 MPG-e (100 mpg_{‑US} (2.4 L/100 km; 120.1 mpg_{‑imp})). Later, when owners complained of not achieving the sticker fuel economy, and following a technical review, the official EPA rating in EV mode was downgraded to 88 MPG-e (88 mpg_{‑US} (2.7 L/100 km; 105.7 mpg_{‑imp})). In a similar way, initially the EPA rating in hybrid-gasoline mode was 43 mpg_{‑US} (5.5 L/100 km; 52 mpg_{‑imp}), but it was later downgraded to 38 mpg_{‑US} (6.2 L/100 km; 46 mpg_{‑imp}). EPA's rating for combined EV/hybrid operation is 51 MPG-e (4.6 L gasoline equivalent/100 km), which allows the C-Max Energi to rank in sixth place, together with the Fusion Energi, among the top ten EPA-Rated Fuel Sippers since 1984.

The C-Max Energi has an all-electric range of 20 miles (32 km), for a total EPA certified range of 550 miles (890 km), which in 2012 surpassed both the first-generation Chevrolet Volt (380 miles (610 km)), and the Prius Plug-in Hybrid (540 miles (870 km)).

==== Sales ====
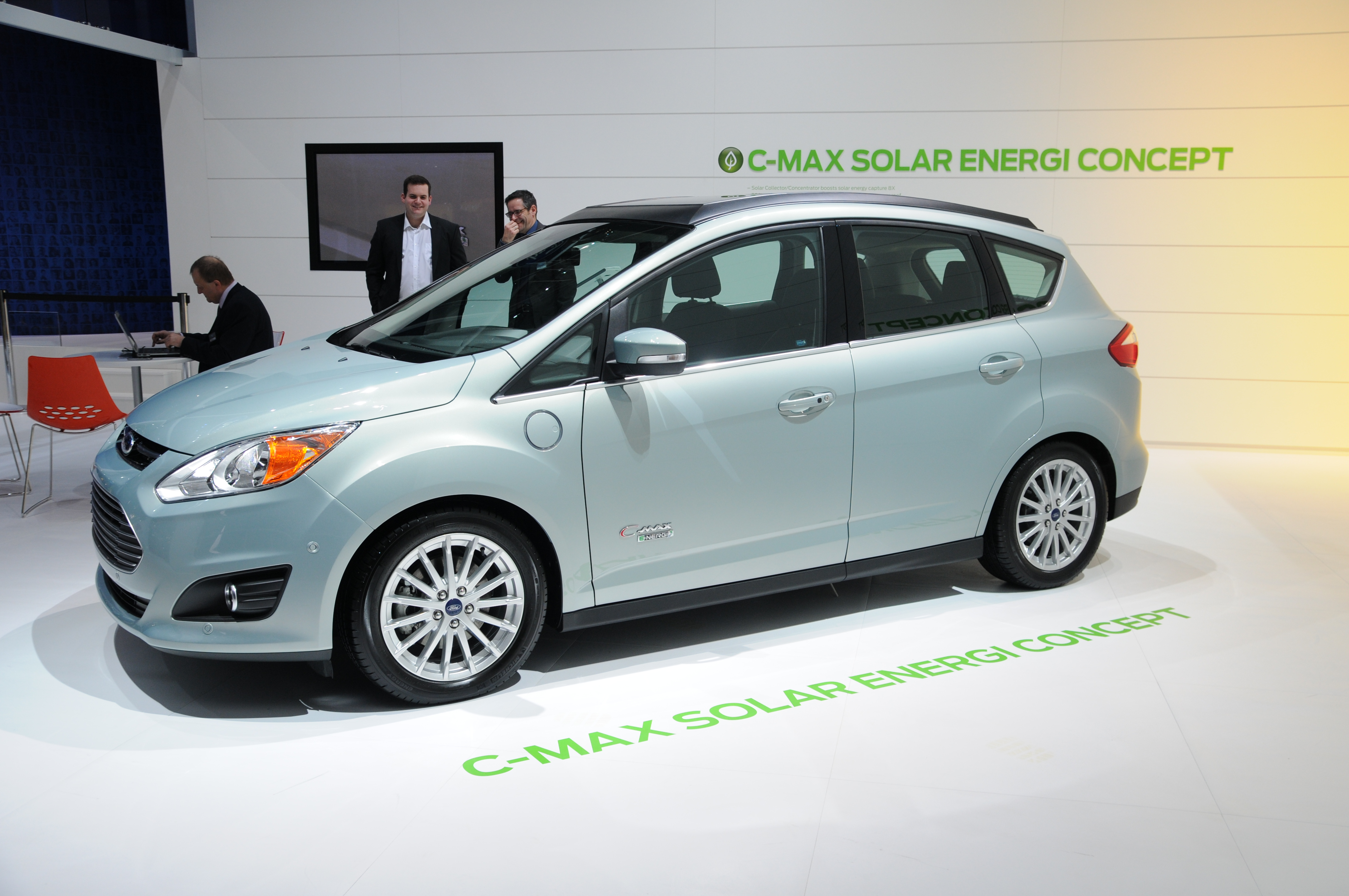
Ford C-Max Solar Energi concept exhibited at the 2014 Geneva Motor Show

Ford released the C-Max Energi in the U.S. market by mid October 2012, and during that month 144 units were delivered to U.S. retail customers, and ended with 2,374 units delivered in 2012. The C-Max Energi ranked as the fifth top selling plug-in electric car in the U.S. during 2013, and climbed to number fourth in 2014. Over 35,700 units have been sold in North America and Europe through December 2016, with 33,509 units delivered in the U.S. through December 2016, 967 units in Canada through December 2016, and 1,229 in the Netherlands in 2015.

=== C-Max Solar Energi concept ===
Ford Motor Company announced the C-MAX Solar Energi concept, a solar PV-powered vehicle to run electrically without depending on the electric grid for fuel. The C-MAX Solar Energi Concept was unveiled at the 2014 International CES in Las Vegas. This is a collaborative project of Ford, SunPower Corp. and the Georgia Institute of Technology.

=== Production ===
For the North American market, the C-Max Hybrid was assembled alongside the 2012 Focus and Ford Focus Electric at Ford's Wayne plant in Michigan. The C-Max Energi was also assembled in Michigan. Since 2015, all European versions are built in the Saarlouis Body & Assembly, Germany. Ford of Europe announced that it would end production of both the C-Max and Grand C-Max in Germany by the end of the second quarter of 2019.

== Recognition ==
- The C-Max Energi was awarded the 2012 Green Car Vision Award by the Green Car Journal at the 2012 Washington Auto Show.
- Both the Ford C-Max hybrid and the Energi plug-in hybrid were among the five finalists for the 2013 Green Car of the Year awarded by the Green Car Journal at the 2012 Los Angeles Auto Show.

In Europe, the C-Max is designed with lower VOC and allergens, along with several other Ford vehicles.

== See also ==
- Ford B-Max
- Ford C-Max Energi
- Ford C-Max Hybrid
- Ford EcoBoost
- Ford Focus
- Ford Fusion
- Ford I-Max
- Ford Mondeo
- Ford S-Max
