= Citroën C-Airdream =

Overview
- Manufacturer: Citroën
- Production: 2002

Body and chassis
- Class: Concept car
- Body style: 2-door combi coupé

Powertrain
- Engine: 3.0 L V6

The Citroën C-Airdream is a concept car created by the Citroën division of the French car company PSA Peugeot Citroën, first presented at the 2002 Paris Motor Show. The C-Airdream is designed to be very slender and aerodynamic.

== Overview ==
Rear

The C-Airdream has a naturally-aspirated 3.0-litre V6 engine, producing 210 hp (157 kW), and 260 N⋅m (192 lb⋅ft) of torque.

The 2-door C-Airdream features an aerodynamic design with an all-glass roof and has a drag coefficient of Cd0.28. The interior features no foot pedals or a gear lever, with all the resulting drive-by-wire controls located on the steering wheel.
