= 2002 Paris Motor Show =

International auto show

- Genre: Auto show
- Begins: September 28, 2002
- Ends: October 13, 2002
- Venue: Paris Expo Porte de Versailles
- Location: Paris
- Country: France
- Previous event: 2000 Paris Motor Show
- Next event: 2004 Paris Motor Show

The 2002 Paris Motor Show (Mondial de L'Automobile) took place from 28 September to 13 October 2002. It boasted over 700 automobile makes from over 30 different countries.

== Introductions ==
=== Production Cars ===
- Bentley Continental GT (pre-production)
- Mercedes-Benz S-Class (facelift)
- Mercedes-Benz CL-Class (facelift)
- Citroën C3 Pluriel
- Peugeot 307 CC
- Renault Mégane II
- Nissan Micra
- Porsche Cayenne
- SEAT Córdoba
- Volkswagen Touareg
- Ford StreetKa
- Audi A8
- Toyota Land Cruiser
- Opel Meriva
- Alfa Romeo 147 GTA
- Honda Accord VII (European introduction)
- Bentley Continental GT
- Mazda2

=== Concept Cars ===
- Citroën C-Airdream
- Ford Focus C-MAX MAV Concept
- Renault Ellypse
- Kia KCV II
- Opel Eco Speedster
- Mazda6 MPS Concept

== See also ==
- Paris Motor Show
